= ISKCON =

Hindu religious organisation

- Official emblem of ISKCON

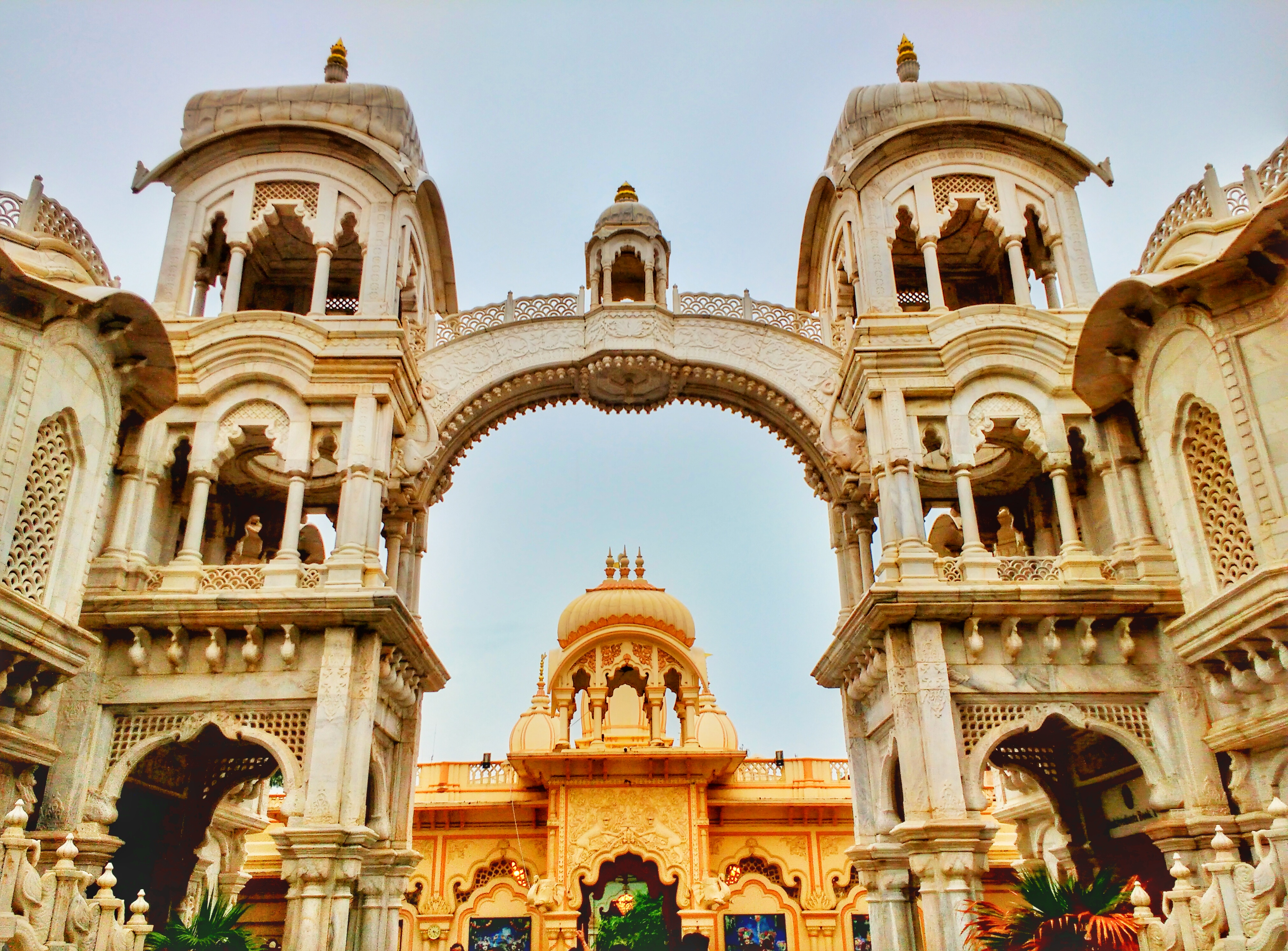
- ISKCON Temple in Vrindavan, Mathura, Uttar Pradesh, India
- Abbreviation: ISKCON
- Formation: 13 July 1966 (60 years ago) New York City, United States
- Founder: A. C. Bhaktivedanta Swami Prabhupada
- Type: Religious organization
- Legal status: Foundation
- Headquarters: Mayapur, Nabadwip, Nadia, West Bengal, India
- Location(s): 800+ temples and centres
- Coordinates: 23.4248°N 88.3889°E
- Region served: Worldwide
- Main organ: Governing Body Commission
- Affiliations: Gaudiya Vaishnavism (Hinduism)
- Website: iskcon.org

The International Society for Krishna Consciousness (ISKCON), commonly known as the Hare Krishna Movement, is a Hindu religious organization. It follows the Gaudiya Vaishnava tradition, which emphasizes devotion (bhakti) to Krishna as the supreme deity. The ISKCON was founded on 13 July 1966 in New York City by A. C. Bhaktivedanta Swami Prabhupada. The organization's spiritual and administrative headquarters is located in Mayapur, West Bengal, India, and it claims a global membership of around one million people.

ISKCON teaches a form of panentheistic Hinduism rooted in the Bhagavad Gita, the Bhagavata Purana, and other scriptures, interpreted through the commentaries of its founder. Although commonly regarded as monotheistic by the general public, ISKCON theology emphasizes that the Supreme Being, Krishna, manifests in multiple forms while remaining the singular, ultimate reality. The movement is described as the largest and most influential branch of the Gaudiya Vaishnava tradition, which originated in India in the early 16th century and expanded internationally during the late 20th century.

ISKCON promotes bhakti yoga—the path of devotional service to Krishna—as the central spiritual practice of its members, who are often referred to as "bhaktas." The movement also encourages lacto vegetarianism, regular chanting of the Hare Krishna mantra, and strict ethical and devotional disciplines as part of its teachings on spiritual progress.

== History and beliefs ==
=== Background ===
Viṣṇu was a minor deity in the historical Vedic religion, to which Vaiṣṇavism has only "a very indirect connection". In the ancient Sanskrit epic Mahābharāta, Kr̥ṣṇa is both God and an ally of the Pāṇḍavas. The Bhāgavata Purāṇa enumerates numerous avatāras of Viṣṇu and of them considers Kr̥ṣṇa to be Svayam Bhagavān; many concepts integral to the Gauḍīya Vaiṣṇava tradition such as līlā, acintyabhedābheda, overflowing emotion in bhakti, and reciting the names of Hari find their foundation in this text. The theme of emotional devotion to Kr̥ṣṇa continued in bhakti poetry such as the Sanskrit Gīta-Govinda of Jayadeva and the Bengali poems of Caṇḍīdāsa, both of which were influential to Gauḍiya Vaiṣṇavism.

The Gauḍīya sampradāya claims to originate from the Madhva sampradaya through Lakṣmīpati Tīrtha and Mādhavendra Puri; scholars debate the historicity of this connection and most consider them to have been Vaishnava-oriented Shankarite aka Dashanami sannyasis (many consider Baladeva Vidyabhushana to be responsible for connecting the Gaudiya's to the Madhva lineage). Caitanya Mahāprabhu, born in sixteenth century Bengal, is considered the founder of Gauḍīya Vaiṣṇavism, called such because it was spread in Gauḍa (region) i.e. Bengal. During the period around Caitanya's life, Bengal was ruled by a Muslim government which nevertheless patronized Vaiṣṇavas and their cultural work. There exist several biographies of Caitanya which are capped by the Caitanya-Caritāmr̥ta of Kr̥ṣṇadāsa Kavirāja; each biography explores Caitanya's life and Gauḍīya conceptions of his divinity. Caitanya started life as a precocious paṇḍita but soon became a sannyāsī ("ascetic") entranced with ecstatic devotion to Kr̥ṣṇa who developed a strong following centered around the recitation of Kr̥ṣṇa's names. Caitanya went on a pilgrimage of South India and is depicted as debating various religious groups and converting them to Gauḍīya Vaiṣṇavism; scholars also believe he was searching for Vaiṣṇava traditions that did not survive in the Muslim-dominated North India. In Caitanya's pilgrimage of Vraja, he visited sites associated with Kr̥ṣṇa's life and is depicted as exhibiting ecstasies indicative of his true nature as Kr̥ṣṇa. Of sites in Vraja, Rādhā Kuṇḍa was considered by Gauḍīya's to be the most esoteric. On the return journey, he tasked Rūpa Gosvāmī and Sanātana Gosvāmī (future leaders of the Six Goswamis of Vrindavan) to develop the theology of his saṁpradāya. The temple of Jagannātha in Caitanya's resident city of Puri is an important religious site for Gauḍīya Vaiṣṇavas and other Hindus; the Jagannātha deity has very old traditions regarding its origin, relation to the Gajāpati rulers and devadāsīs, and the Ratha Yātrā. Caitanya did not give anyone initiation nor he did he appoint a successor, but served as a "rallying point" for his contemporaries and was considered a yuga-avatāra (a contemporary incarnation of Krishna).

Sādhanā is the means or method used to increase devotion to God; in the Gauḍīya sampradāya sādhanas include worship of an arcā-vigraha (God in an idol form), smaraṇa (recalling) of Kr̥ṣṇa's līlās, saṅkīrtana (congregational chanting about Kr̥ṣṇa), vaidhī bhakti (following fixed ritual injunctions), rāgānugā bhakti (spontaneous and passionate devotion while assuming a personality from Kr̥ṣṇa's life). The Gauḍīya Vaiṣṇava tradition considers Brahman to be infinite and having all personal qualities; it is strongly opposed to the Advaita philosophy that Brahman is indescribable and impersonal with no qualities. The Gauḍīya philosophy of acintya-bhedābheda considers reality to be inconceivably different and non-different at the same time; the Six Goswamis of Vrindavan were powerful scholarly figures who were able to rationalize the philosophy and give it prestige. Hinduism has a long tradition of what has been termed "sonic theology", i.e. the spiritual and mundane effects of speaking certain syllables; the Gauḍīya tradition's sonic theology focuses on the loud chanting of Kr̥ṣṇa's names and the Hare Kr̥ṣṇa mantra to increase Kr̥ṣṇa devotion. Gauḍīya Vaiṣṇavism has aspects of mysticism, where devotees attempt to attain certain ecstatic emotional states (sāttvika bhāvas) which has been termed "divine madness" (divyonmāda); through līlā smaraṇa devotees assume a dual identity as a mañjarī (a preteen handmaiden of Rādhā or Rādhā's friends) in Kr̥ṣṇa līlā and as a Bengali brāhmaṇa boy in Gaura līlā (the life of Caitanya). In Gauḍīya theology, rasa refers to the cultivated emotion a devotee has for Kr̥ṣṇa, the highest being madhura rasa or selfless erotic love for Kr̥ṣṇa. The līlā smaraṇa and mañjarī sādhana techniques are found to a greater extent among Gauḍīya ascetics; whereas householder (gr̥hastha) devotees more often access Kr̥ṣṇa līlā physically through pilgrimage to Vraja. While not mentioned directly in the Bhāgavata Purāṇa, the goddess Rādhā is considered chief among the gopīs (the cowherd girls of Vraja). Gauḍiya theology considers her to have the highest level of loving devotion for Kr̥ṣṇa (mahābhava) and Rādhā-Kr̥ṣṇa is considered the ultimate esoteric reality and receives the highest worship by Gauḍiya Vaiṣṇavas. After Caitanya's death in 1534, the movement's philosophy and teachings were consolidated by his followers but eventually declined in popularity. In eastern India, Vaiṣṇava Sahajiyā is a Vāma-Tantra tradition in which male and female devotees imitate the erotic relationship between Kr̥ṣṇa and Rādha; this tradition is met with abhorrence by the orthodox Gauḍīya Vaiṣṇava tradition, which asserts that devotees can only serve and may not imitate the divine couple. The theologies of the Vrindavan goswamis were brought to Bengal in the late-sixteenth century and consolidated the teachings of Radha-Krishna worship in madhura rasa, pancha tattva (recognition of Chaitanya's associates as incarnations of Krishna's associates), and raganuga bhakti/siddha pranali.

The Gaudiya Vaishnava tradition accepted the existing tradition of hereditary Brahmin kula gurus. The Hari-bhakti-vilasa and Bhakti Rasamrita Sindhu of the Vrindavan goswamis approved of householder gurus and dissallowed ascetics to take disciples. The Gaudiya tradition rejected the Brahmin-only Dashanami sannyasa tradition of Chaitanya and his predecessors; unlike the saffron robes of the Shankarites Gaudiya renunciates (of any caste) wore white (a practice called bhekh) and were called babajis. Despite concessions of Krishna bhakti to lower castes, Gaudiya Vaishnavism remained in Brahmanical control and preserved the social status quo.

Sri Chaitanya Mahaprabhu, His life and Precepts, the book sent by Bhaktivinoda to Western scholars in 1896.

In the 19th century, the leading castes in Bengal included the Kulīna Brāhmanas who served as priests and teachers and Kulīna Kāyasthas who served as writers and scribes. Below them were Non-Kulīna Brahmanas who were landowners and entrepreneurs and non-Kulīna Kāyasthas, who achieved great economic success under British rule and were subject to Westernization. The Westernized non-Kulīna Brāhmanas and Kāyasthas were attracted to Western philosophies but viewed Gaudiya Vaishnavism with distaste as idol-worshipping superstition. Bhaktivinoda Thakur (born Kedarnath Dutt), a Westernized Gaudiya Vaishnava Kayastha, developed a rigorous intellectual interest in Gaudiya religious literature and began a personal mission to publish its texts and promote its teachings. Bhaktivinoda oriented his philosophies to a Westernized Bengali Hindu audience, arguing that Gaudiya Vaishnavism is a sophisticated universal religion in contrast to the hereditary caste-based nature of orthodox Brahmanism. Bhaktivinoda was a vocal opponent of Vaiṣṇava Sahajiyā (which had increased in popularity by the 19th century), "rediscovered" the "lost" birthplace of Caitanya, and deemphasized the external exhibition of caste. He also attempted to spread Caitanyite teachings among the Western world by sending texts to foreign universities. Bhaktivinoda utilised contemporary 19th-century scholarly methods (adhunika vada) to critically analyse Gaudiya Vaishnavism. He developed innovative theological principles such as his categorisation of spiritual seekers based on their intellectual capacity and his division of religious knowledge into phenomenal knowledge (which he considered subject to logical scrutiny) and transcendental knowledge (which he considered inscrutible).

Bhaktivinoda's son was Bhaktisiddhanta Sarasvati (born Bimala Prasad Dutt), who continued his father's mission and extended its views on social equality. Bhaktisiddhanta claimed to be the initiate of Gaura Kishor Das Babaji, but details of his initiation are mysterious. In contrast to the standard pancharatrika diksha most sources claim he received bhagavati diksha (a practice unknown in Vaishnava circles). Bhaktisiddhanta claimed he belonged to an invented Bhagavata parampara which focused on raganuga bhakti which he contrasted with the ritualistic Pancharatrika tradition which he claimed had infested Gaudiya Vaishnavism. Nevertheless, Bhaktisiddhanta initiated his own disciples in the standard Pancharatrika form and did not give clear instructions on how to continue the bhagavata tradition. In contrast to his father's deemphasis on caste, Bhaktisiddhanta Saraswati allowed any devotee who exhibited the proper characteristics to consider themselves a brahmin (brāhmaṇa) and adorn the corresponding dress, challenging the existing system of hereditary Gauḍīya Vaiṣṇava temple priests. Unlike his father, Bhaktisiddhanta was not employed in any official position which allowed him the time to create and manage the Gaudiya Math (Gauḍīya Maṭha), the first formal organisation of Vaiṣṇava sādhus/sannyāsīs. The Gaudiya Math broke with Gaudiya tradition by adopting the saffron robes of the Shankarites and the tridanda ("triple staff") of Puranic tradition. Prior to Bhaktivedanta, the Gaudiya Math had sent individuals to the West to convert foreigners to very little success. Prior to his death, Bhaktisiddhanta gave three disciples joint governorship of the Gaudiya Math: Ananta Vasudeva, Kunjabihari, and Paramananda. A council of Gaudiya Math leaders elected Ananta Vasudeva (later Puri Maharaj or Puri Das) as acharya, a decision which was rejected by Kunjabihari (later Bhaktivilas Tirtha) and his followers. Many other disciples also split off to create their own independent organisations. Puri Das discarded secondary literature of post-Chaitanyite figures and began to focus on the works of the Six Goswamis of Vrindavan (the Gaudiya Math ignored content from their works that was not purely philosophical or spiritual) and eventually became a major critic of the Gaudiya Math. Highlighting differences between traditional Gaudiya Vaishnavism and the Gaudiya Math, Puri Das encouraged Bhaktisiddhanta disciples to instead take initiation in traditional Gaudiya lineages. During this period Bhaktivedanta was a minor househoulder who unsuccessfully urged a return to the "hard" institution of Bhaktisiddhanta's time. By the mid-20th century the Gaudiya Math was no longer a "hard" institution but a loose collection of disciple lines and independent organisations.

Indian immigrants and Hindu thought among (particularly occult) White Americans began filtering into the United States in the 19th century, and both elicited negative reactions from the American public. The public viewed Indians and Hinduism as backward and its public visibility as threatening to white Christian Americans. After the Asian Exclusion Act, there was a 30-year lull in reactions to Hinduism, which changed after the Immigration and Nationality Act of 1965 and the foundation of the International Society for Krishna Consciousness, at the time the most visible face of Hinduism in America. The Hare Krishna movement differed from these earlier expressions of Hindu philosophy in the West in that it was an explicitly theistic religious tradition that required absolute adherence to its rules and taboos. Earlier expressions of Hinduism in the West tended to belong to the monistic tradition of Advaita Vedanta and were propagated by "streamlined swamis" who greatly diluted Eastern thought and did not require people to give up their current lifestyles.

=== Foundation and initial growth ===
Abhay Charan De met Bhaktisiddhanta Sarasvati in 1922; in 1932, Bhaktisiddhanta initiated him as a disciple under the name Abhay Charanaravinda and granted him brahminhood as per his progressive theology. From their first meeting, Bhaktisiddhanta ordered Abhay to spread Gaudiya Vaishnavism in the Western world in the English language, an order that was reiterated weeks before Bhaktisiddhanta's death in 1937. Abhay eventually left his family life and career, at the same time increasing his involvement in preaching and publishing texts on Gaudiya Vaishnavism, being honored with the title of Bhaktivedanta for his knowledge in 1939. Bhaktivedanta chose not to participate in the power struggle following his guru's death and the Gaudiya Math split. In 1959 he took a vow of Sannyasa (renunciation of the world) under the name A.C. Bhaktivedānta Svāmī in Vrindavan, and in 1965 arrived in New York City.

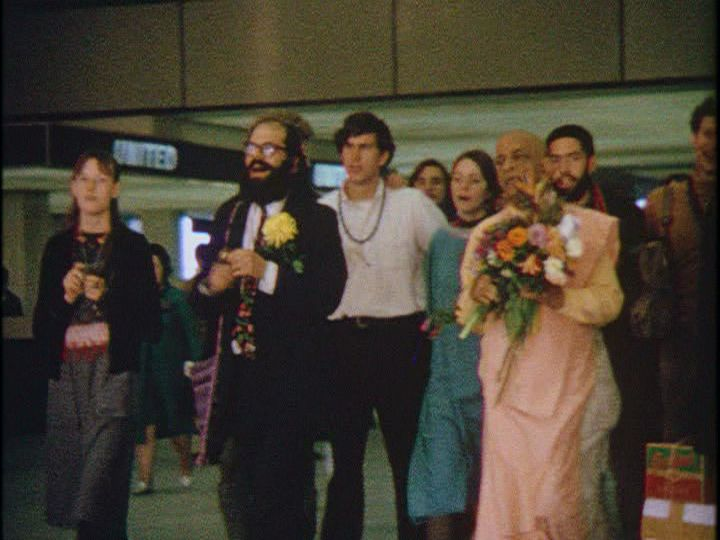
Prabhupada's arrival in San Francisco, 1967

After failing to attract interest from the upper class, Bhaktivedanta moved into a poor district in New York City, where he made connections with young people of the 1960s counterculture (bohemians, later called hippies) who were already semi-familiar with Indian culture from previous experiences and were attracted by Bhaktivedanta's charisma. In July 1966 he founded the International Society for Krishna Consciousness, whose purpose would be to propagate spiritual consciousness of Krishna as per the Bhagavad Gita and Shrimad Bhagavatam, the Chaitanyite form of public chanting, and publication of texts. In the September of the same year he initiated his young companions as disciples and led the first public kirtana in Washington Square Park. In the early years of the movement in New York City, Prabhupada gave little emphasis to the lifestyle principles of ISKCON and tolerated violations to traditional purity and ritual structures; this allowed the movement to spread through social networks. The only structure in the movement was the chanting of the Hare Krishna mantra; gradually Bhaktivedanta educated his disciples in aspects of the original Indian tradition. After relocating the movement to Haight-Ashbury, San Francisco, California in 1967, the movement grew rapidly due to large itinerant hippie population amenable to public preaching. In the next two years the movement gained followers in North American cities and he became known to his followers as Śrīla Prabhupāda. Soon after, Prabhupada decided to establish a Governing Body Commission (GBC) as the central authority of ISKCON on 28 July 1970, who would have zonal authority over temples and centers. The Bhaktivedanta Book Trust was established to centralize the publication of ISKCON texts. The first Hare Krishna commune, New Vrindavan (West Virginia), was established by disciples in 1968. In 1968 disciples successfully established contact with George Harrison of the Beatles in the United Kingdom, who recorded the hit single Hare Krishna Mantra. The first ISKCON temple in Europe was founded in Bury Place, London.

Prabhupada's goal was to spread Chaitanyite Vaishavism across the world in a strategy he termed "cultural conquest". He was pessimistic towards modern industrial society and advocated a self-sufficient, rural agrarian economy; nevertheless he did not oppose utilising modern technology as long as it was for devotional service. Prabhupada stated that the Bhagavata Purana (aka Srimad Bhagavatam) and other such texts could only be understood if recited by a "self-realised" person who stands as a "bona fide representative" of Shuka (the traditional composer of the text). The only manner to be a bona fide representative according to Prabhupada was to be in the disciplic succession (parampara) stretching back to Shuka and from there to Krishna himself. Prabhupada repeatedly stated he wants many of his disciples to become gurus but stressed that a disciple must perfectly follow the teachings of his guru (who in turn perfectly replicates his own guru linking back to Krishna) and not "manufacture" any new innovations. Prabhupada preached that reciting the Hare Krishna mantra and hearing the Bhagavata Purana being recited renders direct experience of divinity, a process he considered a "science of the spirit".

Despite the creation of the GBC, Prabhupada retained autocratic control over ISKCON during his lifetime. Key to the spread of ISKCON were Prabhupada's writings and translations including the Bhagavad-gītā As It Is, Kṛṣṇa: The Supreme Personality of Godhead, Śrīmad-bhāgavatam, Caitanya-caritāmṛta, and the Back to Godhead magazine. Prabhupada went on cross-country tours to establish ISKCON internationally. His devotion-oriented English translations and commentaries of Gaudiya Vaishnava texts were oriented to the neophyte Western mind. According to Hopkins, young Westerners were eager to submit themselves to Prabhupada's strong disciplinary structure (opposite to the loose ways of the 1960s counterculture) and his example of a devotional path. When instructing his disciples he instilled them the belief that no matter what work they had to do, Krishna would help them.

=== Global spread ===
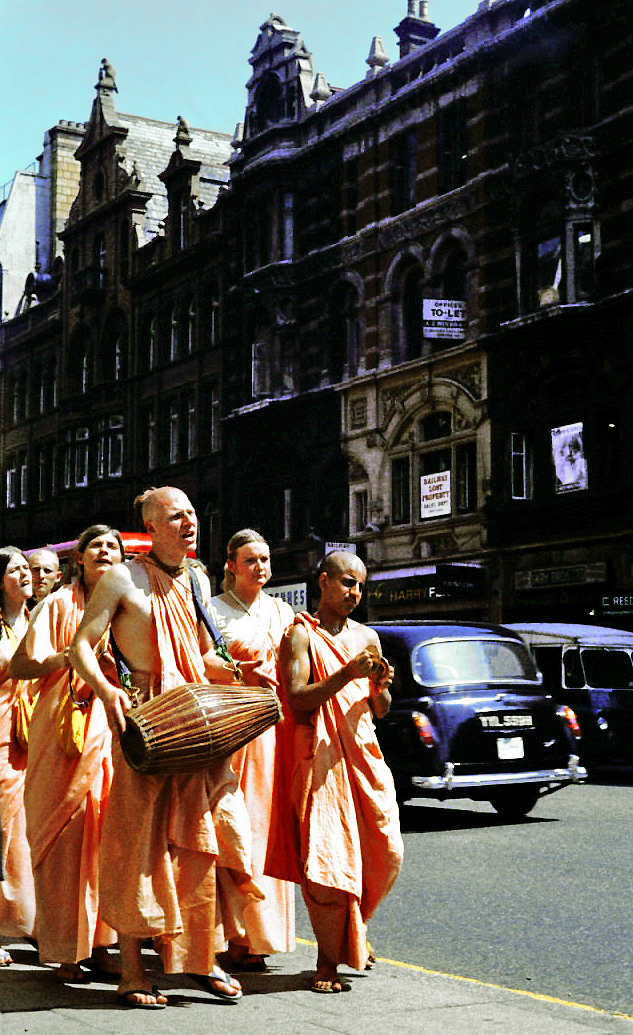
Hare Krishna devotees, London, England (1970).

As ISKCON established centers throughout the United States, it adapted its recruitment modes depending on the environment of the city and neighborhood at hand. As ISKCON became more closed off in the 1970s up until Prabhupada's death, movement sympathizers were key to its spread. In the late 1970s, some ISKCON centers became more open to public relationships and influences, to the chagrin of conservative centers.

After returning to India with his Western disciples, Prabhupada was keen on establishing large temple complexes in Bombay, Bengal, and Vrindaban; by displaying the Krishna devotion of his non-Indian devotees, Prabhupada wanted to awaken a religious revival among Indians. Prabhupada was aware that in order to gain legitimacy from Indians; his foreign followers had to maintain strict behavior rules in India and display proper devotion in order for people to take seriously their claims of being Vaishnavas and brāhmaṇas.

=== Finances ===
Until 1972, ISKCON's finances were covered by the practice of sankirtana: the practice of distributing literature on the street and soliciting donations. In following years this profitable practice expanded to other public spaces such as airports. However, as the movement grew larger and its monetary needs increased, the nature of sankirtana began to change from preaching Krishna consciousness to book-selling: disciples targeted people perceived to have more money, disguised their religious affiliations to more easily distribute books and solicit donations, engaged in the practice of change-up (re-negotiating for a higher price after the target already agreed on an amount), and even sold non-religious merchandise without any missionary activity (a practice called picking). ISKCON leadership's newfound preference for picking rather than book distribution drew the ire of public bodies in the late 1970s at the same time the movement and its finances were going into a decline. Picking was morally justified by the finance-conscious leaders, and devotees who earned ISKCON the most money were given special privileges. The religious convictions of the majority of devotees remained unaffected by these practices and treated them as an organizational adaption, a smaller group rejected its ideology but remained within the movement, while the smallest group of idealists defected. Courts of justice generally upheld the rights of ISKCON devotees to proselytize in airports, fairs, and highway rest stops under the First Amendment to the United States Constitution's protection of freedom of religion.

In his final will Prabhupada granted the GBC the ultimate managerial authority of ISKCON, a decision based in his experience of the breakup of the Gaudiya Math and the quarrels for sole acharya-ship. In the months prior to Prabhupada's death in 1977, he appointed eleven of his disciples to serve as initiating gurus and r̥tviks ("officiators") for ISKCON, who would have zonal authority over temples and disciples. The eleven gurus (who self-styled themselves as ācāryas) would serve alongside fourteen non-guru leaders on the Governing Body Commission. The post-Prabhupada succession period was characterized by decline and factionalism. Each guru developed his own economic policies for resources, sat on thrones, and some considered themselves worthy of worship just as Prabhupada had been worshipped as a guru. A guru was the de facto ultimate authority in his zone; the zonal acharyas claimed absolute authority (as in Indian tradition) and viewed the GBC as an expedient committee until a "self-effulgent" leader for ISKCON emerged from amongst the gurus.

=== Crises ===
Notable figures in ISKCON Guru Crises
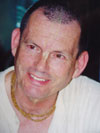
Hansadutta in 1996

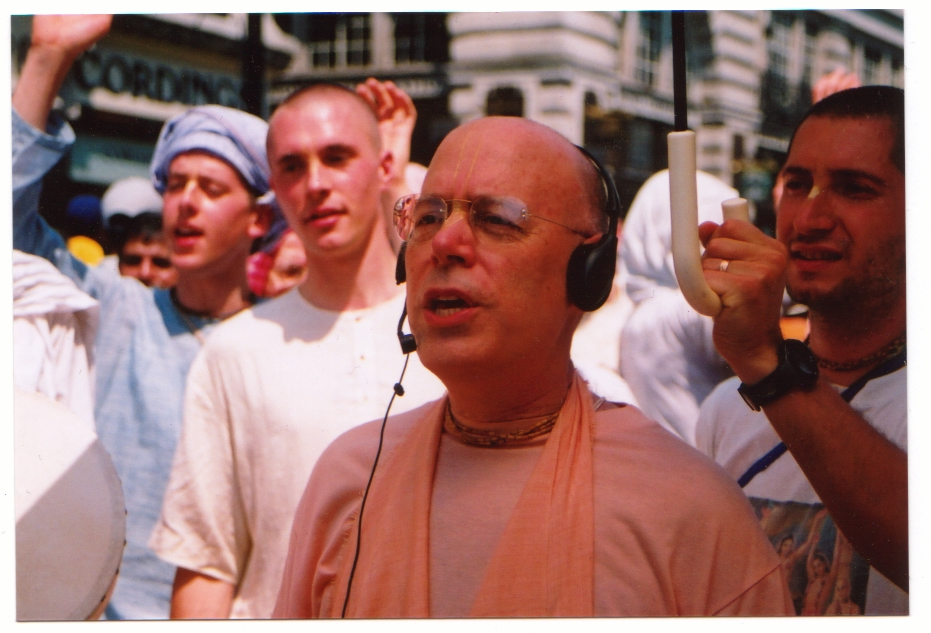
Tamal Krishna in 1999

Kirtanananda in 1982

From 1978 to 1982, there were a series of guru crises that nearly split the movement. In the first guru crisis of 1980, the Berkeley, California police discovered weapons and ammunition stored by the local ISKCON community; Hansadutta Swami was arrested on the charges of illegal arms possession but was later released. In 1983, his guru-ship was suspended for a year on charges of drug abuse and insubordination. In the second guru crisis of 1980, Jayatirtha Swami began behaving bizarrely: he would shriek and cry during kirtan for hours on end, rejoined with his wife despite making a vow of sannyasa, and was rumoured to be taking hallucinogenic drugs. The GBC, on the advice of Bhakti Rakshak Sridhar, suspended Jayatirtha's guruship for a year and forced him to take sannyasa. In the third guru crisis of 1980, Tamal Krishna Swami began claiming he was the sole true intermediary to Prabhupada and that all ISKCON disciples should worship him as guru; the GBC suspended Tamal Krishna's guruship for a year. In the fourth guru crisis of 1980, Ramesvara Swami believed that the previous three crises showed that the ISKCON gurus were not infallible and sought to have the guru worship reduced; the GBC rejected his proposals. Many Prabhupada disciples did not accept that eleven of their fellow disciples now-gurus were perfect devotees of Krishna consciousness that were worthy of worship; many believed in Prabhupada's infallibility and argued that it was impossible that he could have made an error in character judgement by appointing three gurus who would be suspended. They argued that the entire appointment of gurus by Prabhupada was in fact fabricated. The movement faced its most serious schism in 1982, when one guru defected to join Bhakti Rakshak Sridhar. Sridhar was a godbrother of Prabhupada; Prabhupada had told his disciples to seek out Sridhar as an advisor after his death. Sridhar believed in the absolute authority of a guru, and often sided with the gurus against the GBC. After Jayatirtha Swami was forced to take sannyasa by the GBC in 1980, in 1982 he accepted Bhakti Rakshah Sridhar as his guru. The proposal to institute Sridhar as an ISKCON guru in 1982 was rejected due to his criticism of the GBC and Prabhupada, which created a rallying point for ISKCON to unify.

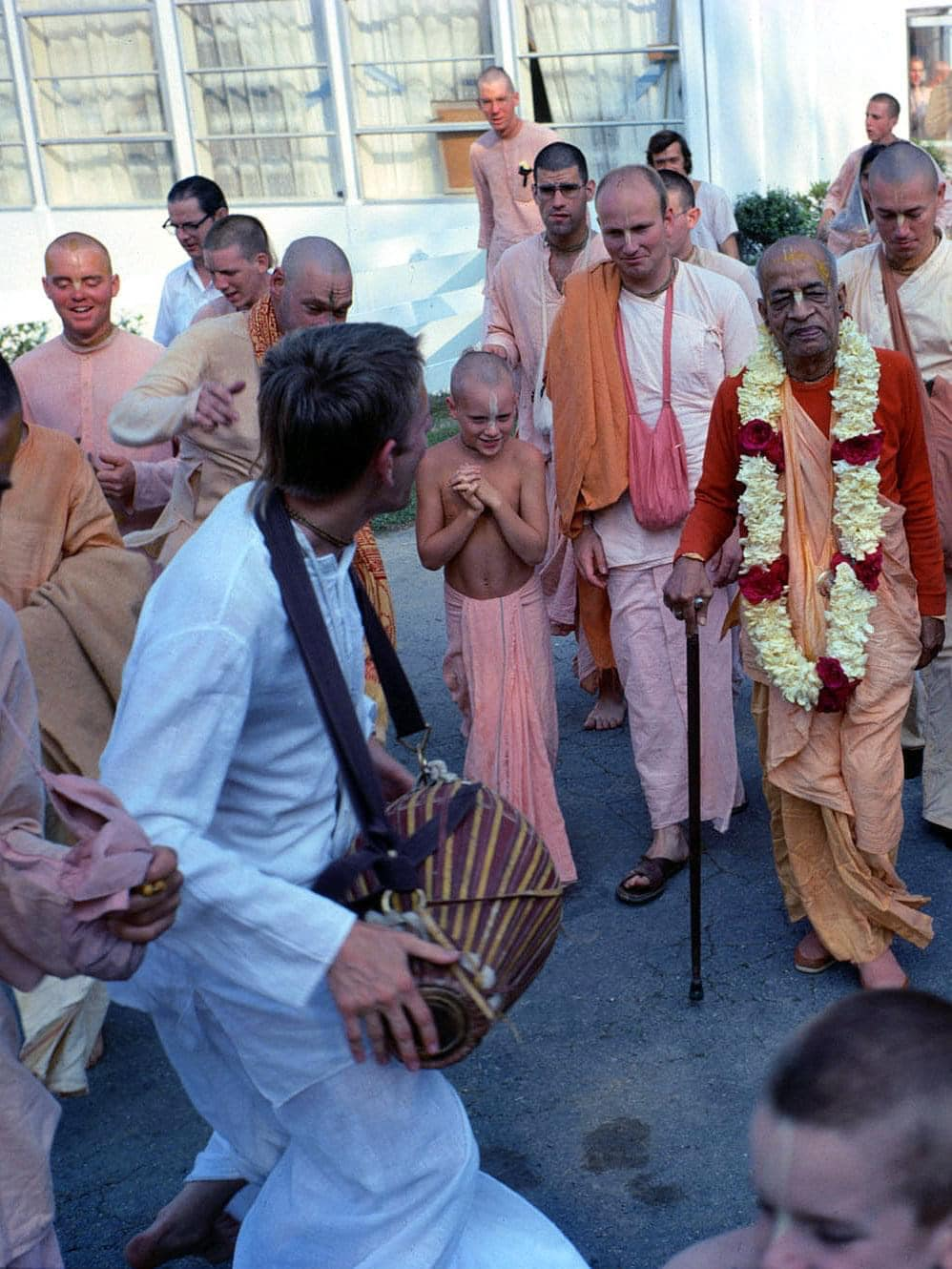
Prabhupada and disciples in ISKCON, Potomac, Maryland, US (1974).

After these incidents, the GBC sought to democratize guru-ship by increasing its members; by 1986 twenty-four new gurus were elected. The GBC pushed the gurus to reduce their worship, remove their thrones, recognize Prabhupada as the sole ISKCON ācārya, and get rid of the zonal system. In 1986, five of the original eleven gurus accepted these reforms, two were already expelled for doctrine, three were removed from guruship for illicit sexual activities, and Kirtanananda Swami was expelled the following year for refusing to accede to the GBC's demands.

=== Women in the movement ===
In the early years of the movement Prabhupada gladly appointed women to prominent positions in the movement. This changed by 1974 with the rise in the focus on the male sannyasa ashram and degradation of householders and women. Women were pushed out of view, a trend which continued after Prabhupada's death in 1977 and the following period of male sannyasi gurus. In the late 1980s there was growing criticism of the treatment of women within the movement, and in the late 1990s the GBC had their first female member. Institutional channels were made for women to voice their views and improve their devotional status, which nevertheless faced a counteroffensive from devotees who considered this to be a "feminist" imposition on ISKCON.

=== After Prabhupada's death ===
A large number of Prabhupada's disciples left ISKCON in the immediate years after his death, with the number of disciples down to approximately 1,000 in 1983 out of a peak of almost 5,000. Starting in the mid-1970s, the movement tried to expand its base beyond the committed disciples to include loosely-committed young members and Indian immigrant "life-members". The practice of picking continued into the 1980s, but the movement expanded its financial base by allowing members to earn money through more specialized businesses. The Indian immigrant community, being professionals and businesspeople, also were a minor source of income. ISKCON took several steps in this period to improve its general reputation, including separating its finances from sankirtana, aligning itself with Hinduism, expanding its food-distribution, and by constructing cultural-religious centers like Prabhupada's Palace of Gold to educate the public about the movement. The decline in sankirtana as a financial base for the movement was a key factor in the breakup of the traditional ISKCON communal lifestyle by the 1990s. By taking up conventional roles in the labour market, devotees became more independent from the temples and began having nuclear families.

In the beginnings of the movement, most followers of Bhaktivedanta knew nothing about India or Hinduism, much less the Gaudiya Vaishnava sect; due to this, Prabhupada was the sole source of knowledge and authority for devotees. In the early days in New York, he readily gave personal instructions to his disciples, but as the movement grew he could no longer give direct attention to all members. Hence Prabhupada was keen on translating and writing texts as instructional material. Prabhupada delegated authority to "senior" disciples, but such disciples were far younger in age (sub-40 years) and far less knowledgeable but were thrust into the senior sannyasi/quasi-independent guru positions in a period of 10 years which traditionally took decades in India. Prabhupada's English publications of the Gaudiya textual canon were essential in propagating the movement. The death of Prabhupada left a void of authority in the movement which the new initiating gurus now had to fill, being far younger and far less knowledgeable than traditional Vaishnava gurus. Prabhupada was of the view that it was acceptable to break orthodox rules (particularly of varnashrama dharma) if it served ISKCON, a view that was extended by the new sannyasi gurus (many of whom held self-superior views) under whose rule women and children received abuse. ISKCON lacked an exegetical tradition beyond Prabhupada, leading devotees to treat all of Prabhupada's statements as ex cathedra; in the post-Prabhupada period, the movement began examining itself over its core identity and its relationship vis-à-vis the Gaudiya Math, Gaudiya Vaishnavism, and Vaishnavism at large.

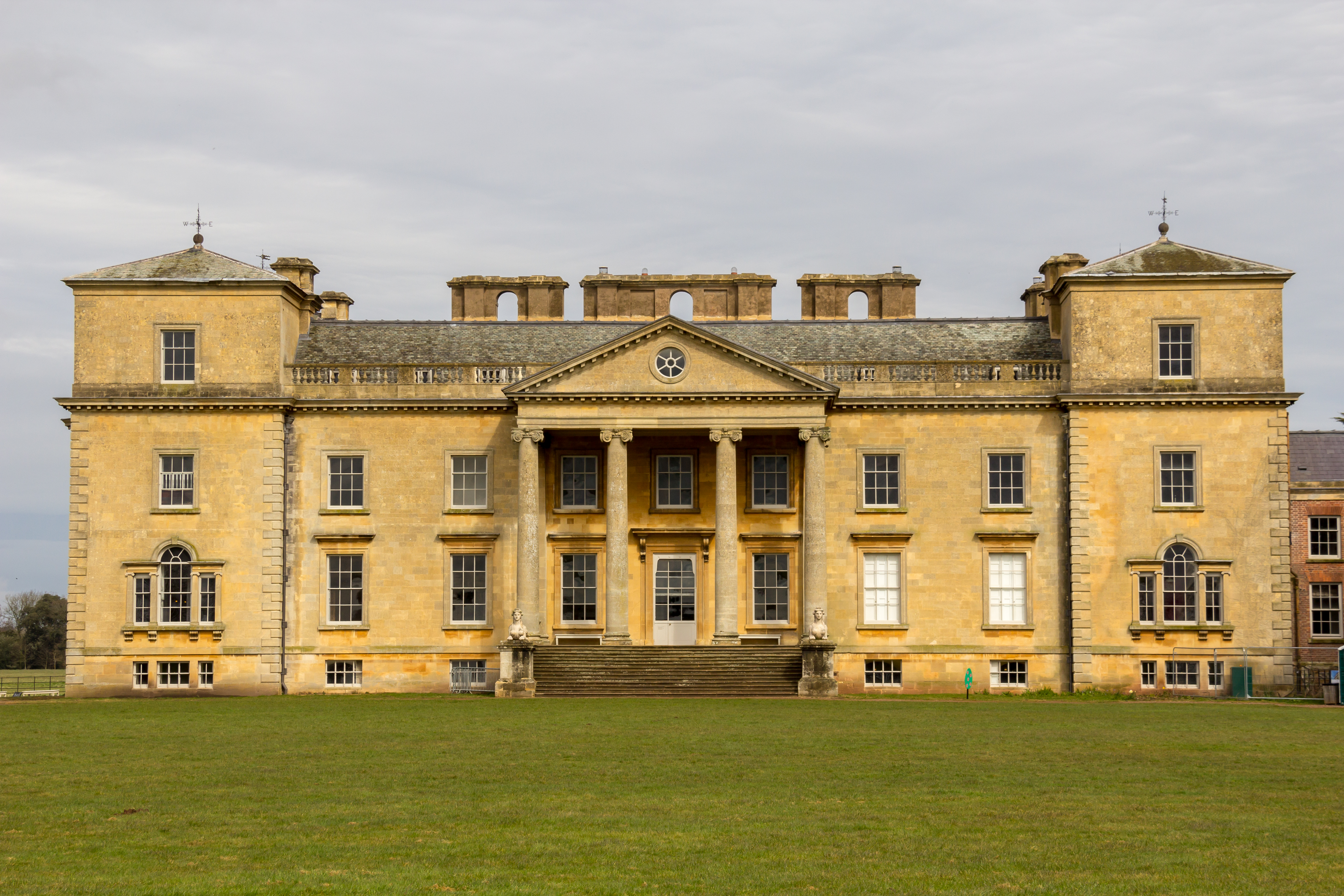
Croome Court, at one point Chaitanya College

After the death of Prabhupada in 1977 in Vrindavana, India, the British disciples were led by the Governing Body Commission and the regional initiating guru, Jayatirtha Dasa. The movement continued to be successful in the 1970s, with many visitors to the headquarters of Bhaktivedanta Manor (formerly John Lennon's estate in Berkshire) and the establishment of Chaitanya College, a former Catholic boys school which was converted into a home and ISKCON educational institution. In 1982, Jayatirtha Dasa's departure from ISKCON shocked the movement in Britain and slowed its spread. Chaitanya College was sold to cover the movement's finances, and the movement regained stability under Bhagavandas Goswami Maharaj.

=== Counterculture ===
ISKCON was founded during the counterculture of the 1960s, whose themes included psychedelia, antitechnology, and self-exploration of experiences beyond the standardness of "the establishment". Ellwood (1989) analyzes the early conversions of Hare Krishna disciples within the context of the experiences of the counterculture and the partial application of deprivation theory, as early members felt dissatisfied with both with "the establishment" and earlier counterculture experiences. However, Elwood posits cognitive theory of religion as more useful for explaining the early conversions, in that the Hare Krishna worldview was more simply more attractive than alternatives to devotees.

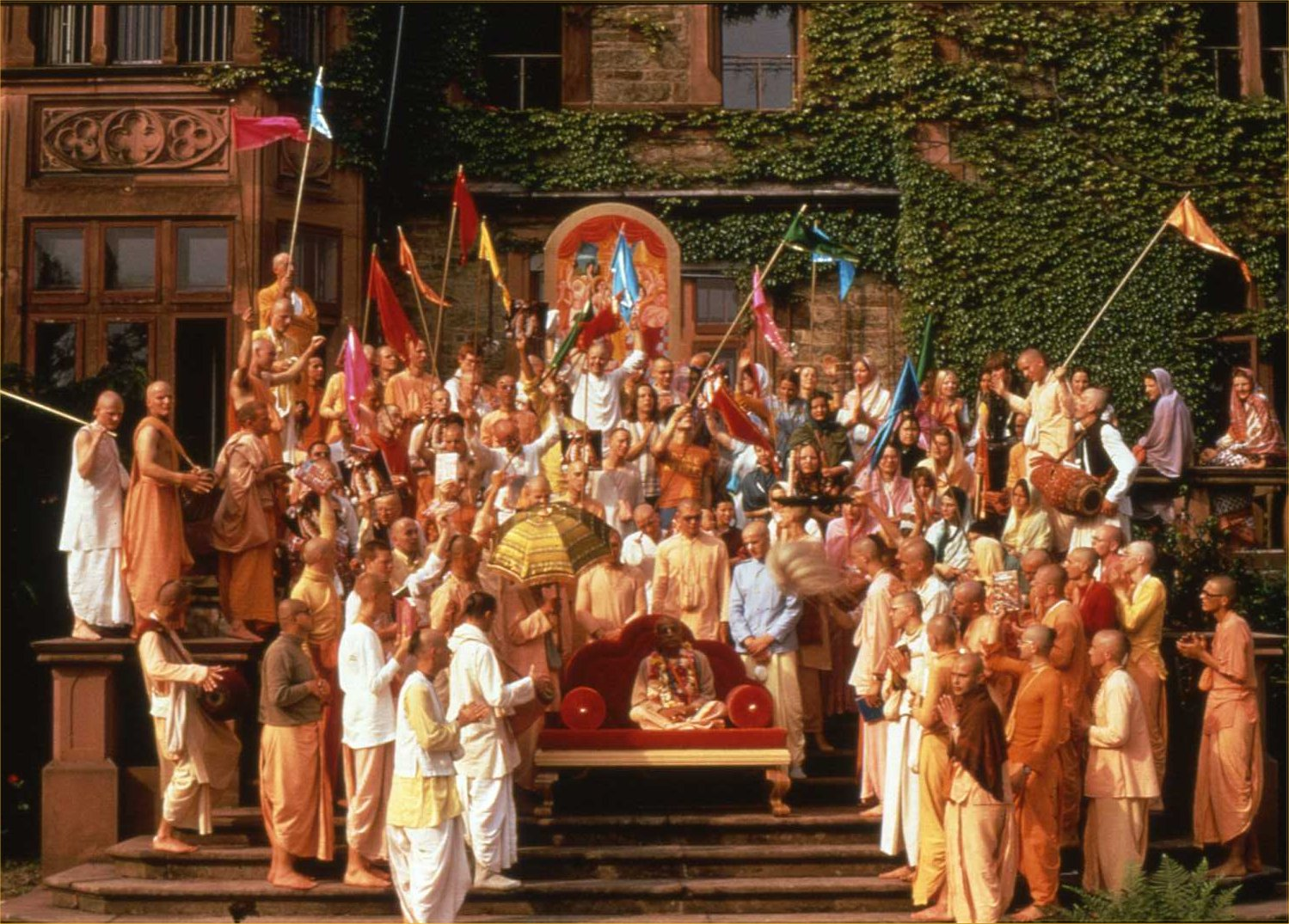
Prabhupada and devotees outside Schloss Rettershof, Frankfurt (1974).

While Prabhupada's original intended audience for Krishna consciousness was the Western elite, he soon pivoted to the marginal youth (hippies) of the 1960s counterculture movement. He characterised the contemporary Western youth as having achieved a state of vairagya (renunciation from the material world) that due to lack of proper instruction had fallen into the refuge of sexual intercourse and drug usage. Prabhupada considered Krishna consciousness as a means to uplift people from the "wretched" and "unclean" hippie movement to a pure state. Prabhupada's followers were young, immature, and inexperienced; due to the rapid growth of the movement and Prabhupada's sense of urgency many devotees were thrust into leadership roles without sufficient training. Further, the counterculture's anti-establishment message became ingrained into ISKCON, which produced hostile, antinomian interactions between devotees and the public. Prabhupada offered a direct experience of God by following a strict program of religious practices (sadhana, see below). The rules were stringent and devotees internalised an ideal of a "pure " Krishna devotee, of which only Prabhupada could be considered an example due to there being not any other mature devotees. As a rule any discussions of spiritual failings by devotees were avoided leading to an unhealthy environment where many devotees left the movement. Former devotees (known as "blooped" within the movement) who could not maintain the full spiritual program were condemned. To the chagrin of temple residents however, "blooped" devotees remained on the periphery of ISKCON, sustaining an irregular allegiance to a movement that no longer wanted any connection to a "failed" devotee. In the early years Prabhupada encouraged and personally approved devotee marriages as a norm, however by 1974 his opinion shifted and no longer approved of any further marriages. Prabhupada and ISKCON began to condemn married householder life and upheld asceticism as the norm. The population of sannyasis exploded in an atmosphere hostile to householders and women; most sannyasis were unable to maintain their vows, with a fall-down rate of almost 90%.

Converts to ISKCON tended to be people who were undergoing a psychological religious identity crisis, who were vegetarians, anti-materialists, and had previously had some exposure to Eastern philosophy. Converts were attracted to certain basic ideas of ISKCON; they decided to reject forming an identity in conventional society and decided to join a community where one's spiritual identity is already defined by sacred tradition. Converts came into the movement via contacts with devotees (particularly at the Sunday feast), close friends and spouses, and ISKCON literature. Converts were attracted to Prabhupada and his eleven successor gurus, and submitted themselves to their guru's authority who was considered the link between devotees and God. ISKCON gurus were not as free as traditional Indian gurus to run their groups as independently as they wished; by setting up the GBC Prabhupada ensured a system of checks and balances to maintain the homogeneity of ISKCON as an institution. According to Shinn, the public viewed ISKCON as "brainwashing" its converts because of negative media depictions, former devotees giving negative depictions of the movement, and parental fears regarding their children's' radical new lifestyles and identities. Shinn considered such claims of brainwashing "ludicrous", stating ISKCON's methods of persuasion were simply enthusiastic preaching. Shinn regarded attempts to "rescue" people from ISKCON via "deprogramming" to more closely resemble traditional brainwashing techniques.

=== Criticism and cult accusations ===
In the first decade of ISKCON's founding, the Hare Krishna movement was treated cordially by the American public. In the 1970s and 1980s however, the group came under attack by secular anti-cult movements and Christian counter-cultists, who viewed the Hare Krishnas negatively as a cult and a new religious movement. ISKCON responded by inviting scholars to establish the credence of the Hare Krishna movement as an authentic religion, presenting itself as a traditional Indian religion, and seeking the support of the Indian-American immigrant community. ISKCON utilized scholars both as expert witnesses in court cases involving the sect's legitimacy, and directly invited them to write works on ISKCON. In the 1970s and 1980s, the traditional Judeo-Christian religions of the West dealt with the growing influence of new religious movements whom they characterized as "cults" which in their view were evil, false religions who brainwashed devotees under an authoritarian leader who ostracized people from their family lives. The Christians and Jews believed that the materialistic Western society and modern cultural shortcomings of Judaism and Christianity allowed new religious movements to flourish. Christian (and to a lesser extent Jewish) literature attacked the Hare Krishna movement's teachings as false, inimical to Christianity, and as ill-hearted brainwashing of counterculture American youth who were disillusioned with materialism and their natal religions. However, Saliba notes there has been some balanced views on ISKCON by Christian and Jewish figures, and there has been dialogue with ISKCON as part of a wider trend of global religious discourse. While Bhaktivedanta himself was critical of other religions, later figures like Graham M. Schweig and Kirtanananda Swami developed more theological positions more accommodating of other religious paths. By the late 1980s, there were a number of psychiatric surveys and clinical studies on new religious movements including ISKCON. The survey tended to either view the new religious movements positively as therapeutic organizations or negatively as destructive organizations. Clinical studies tended to have results that stated ISKCON members had a normal psychological profile. However, Gordon criticizes both the surveys and clinical studies, stating the methodology, observations, and conclusions were limited and flawed and a proper psychiatric study requires a deeper analysis.

The rise in new religious movements among middle class youth subcultures like ISKCON created a "cult scare" amongst families of devotees, who in turn developed the Anti-cult movement. According to Bromley, the Edward Shapiro case and Robin George case exemplify the trends in the anti-cult movement campaign. In both cases, Shapiro and George became attracted to the Hare Krishna movement, and family opposition ensued when the religion began to interfere in "scholastic achievement and family life". Both fled their homes leading their parents to take decisive and controversial measures to bring them home, and both families took the assistance of anti-cult movement physicians. The anti-cult movement's ideology was based on strong family values, a view that secular rationalism is normative human behavior, that new religious movements purportedly engaged in brainwashing/coercive persuasion, and that "cults" were subversive and conspiratorial organizations. Bromley identifies three stages in the development of the anti-cult movement: the formative stage involving forced deprogrammings, an expansionist stage focusing on the believed psychological manipulation by new religious movements, and the professional stage where the supposed brainwashing procedures of new religious movements gained medical recognition and former devotees filed civil suits against the new religious movements for infliction of mental distress.

In the United Kingdom, the media had a various response to the Hare Krishna movement, ranging from favorable to unfavorable. Particularly in the movement's early years, parents feared the novel behaviors of the youth subculture and the believed harm that new religious movements caused. The British anti-cult movement considered ISKCON as one of many novel "cults"; as a result, legislation was proposed before the European Parliament to have higher surveillance on religious groups, however it failed due to concerns regarding religious freedom.

=== Decline ===
The Hare Krishna movement continued to decline into the late 1980s in the United States due to guru crises and desertions. During this period, the movement grew rapidly in Eastern Europe as the Cold War ended. Kirtanananda Swami and New Vrindavan came into the public limelight in 1987 due to the discovery of the bodily remains of a devotee who had gone missing five years earlier, which damaged the reputation of the movement. In the 1990s, the movement shifted its goals from having initiated disciples living in "utopian" communes to outreach to congregational members.

In the first phase of ISKCON's history, the movement was exclusively communitarian with a radical ascetic dualistic philosophy in which the movement and its temples were a “sacred fortress” to safeguard its initiated disciples and their new identities from the believed evil material world, a thought style which led to a strong sense of self-superiority. In the post-Prabhupada period, followers unintentionally engaged in “institutionalized thought” in which ISKCON disciples collectively forgot or ignored injunctions given by authoritative sources such as Chaitanya and Prabhupada, particularly on the subjects of varna-ashrama, succession of gurus, the origin of the soul, and the performance of actions not actively preaching ISKCON's religious message. The movement's radical dualistic outlook led the pre-conversion identities of its members to be pushed to the oblivion of memory in favor of the ISKCON thought collective, leading disciples to feel uneasiness; this eventually led to many resignations and a decay in the movement in the 1980s and 1990s. By the turn of the 21st century, ISKCON experienced a shift in its views on identity, no longer seeing the outside world as something to reject or impose its ideology upon and no longer expecting instantaneous perfection from neophytes.

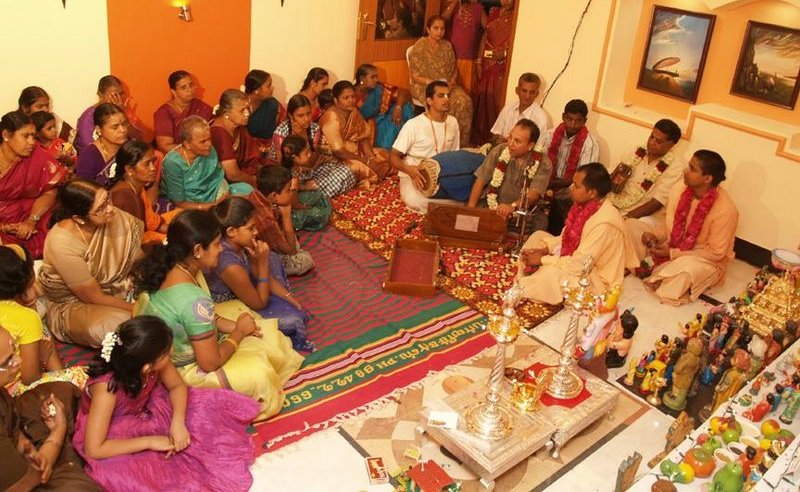
ISKCON's Bhajan during Navaratri Golu at Coimbatore, Tamil Nadu, India

According to Rochford and Neubert, ISKCON has undergone a "Hinduization" over the last several decades. Prabhupada differentiated Kr̥ṣṇa consciousness from Hinduism, arguing that it was not bound by that label and was a universal teaching; however, in recent decades ISKCON members have increasingly used the terms "Hindu" and "Hinduism". Scholars cite three factors for this: participation of diasporic Indian Hindus in the sect, ISKCON devotees having academic careers in which they studied Hindu texts, and increased participation in global inter-religious dialogues in which ISKCON often represents Hinduism.

== Krishna consciousness ==
The Hare Krishna movement follows the teachings of the school of Chaitanya. Chaitanya followed the school of Achintya Bheda Abheda. Prabhupada characterised Krishna consciousness as "easy and sublime". According to Deadwyler, Chaitanyite Vaishnavism offers a direct and intimate contact with God to all peoples regardless of background, with an experience of divinity that is "all-attractive", awe-inspiring, and self-purifying.

Due to the belief in the innateness of bhakti held by certain Gaudiya traditions, they have developed a strong missionary culture to awaken this devotion in the public through chanting of Krishna's names. Devotion is stated to increase in eight states from faith to love. Most Gaudiya groups (including ISKCON), accept the theological and scriptural arguments of eighteenth century philosopher Baladeva Vidyabhushana. Most ISKCON devotees follow a popular, simplified version of the sophisticated Gaudiya philosophy via their devotional practices to Krishna. Klostermaier also identifies the fundamentalist Christian background of western ISKCON converts as a source of origin for the sect's drive to propagate their perceived version of the "true" Vedic tradition across the planet. Other 19th century fundamentalist Christian tendencies of ISKCON identified by Klostermaier includes Agrarianism, anti-scientific religious views, ISKCON's painting style being derived from the 19th century Nazarene movement, and puritanical sexual discipline.

ISKCON adherents worship marble or brass images of Krishna, Radha, the spiritual plant Tulsi, and ISKCON's founder Srila Prabhupada.

=== Sources of Doctrine ===
Key texts include the Bhagavad Gita, Bhagavata Purana, and Chaitanya Charitamrita. Prabhupada's Bhagavad-Gītā As It Is is considered to be the most authentic translation and commentary on the Bhagavad Gita by ISKCON.

=== Nature of Krishna ===
ISKCON describes Krishna as the original source of all the avatars of the Almighty God. Pious believers both teach and claim that Krishna is greater and far more magnanimous than the traditionalist Hindu Trimurti of Vishnu, Shiva and Brahma and all its conceived emanations. According to traditional Gaudiya theology, Krishna is the supreme being and all souls are united in him yet at the same time different. The founder of ISKCON, Prabhupada, differentiates Krishna consciousness from popular Hinduism in that it stresses the awareness of people's relationship with God, à la Arjuna to Krishna. Prabhupada considered Krishna to be "the supreme personality of Godhead", the personal, universal, unlimited deity who manifests in numerous all-attractive forms (avataras) to turn souls away from the material world "back to Godhead".

While some say it is a monotheistic tradition, a deeper study reveals it is a Panentheistic tradition which has its roots in the theistic Vedanta traditions.

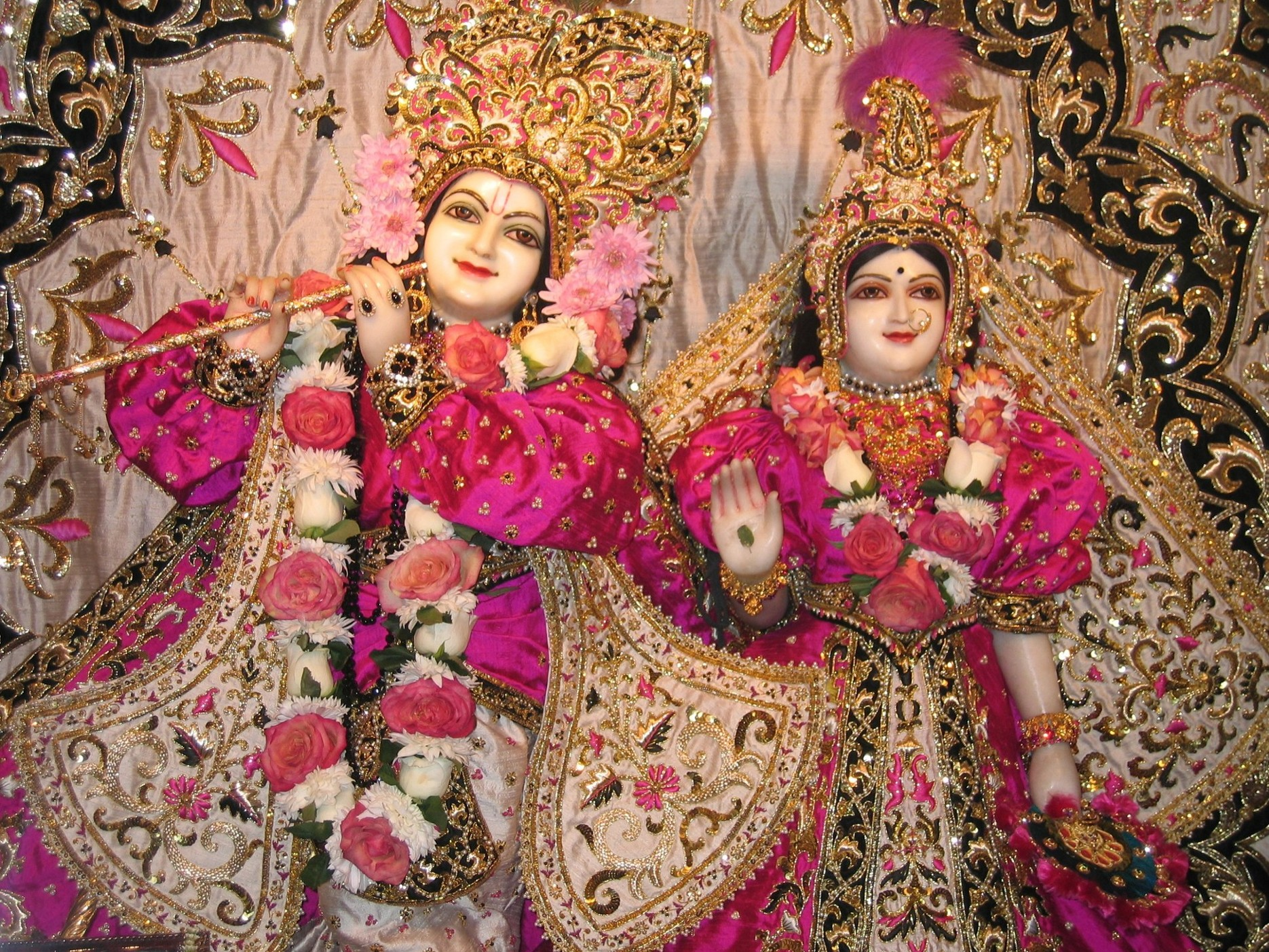
Radha-Londonishvara in London, United Kingdom

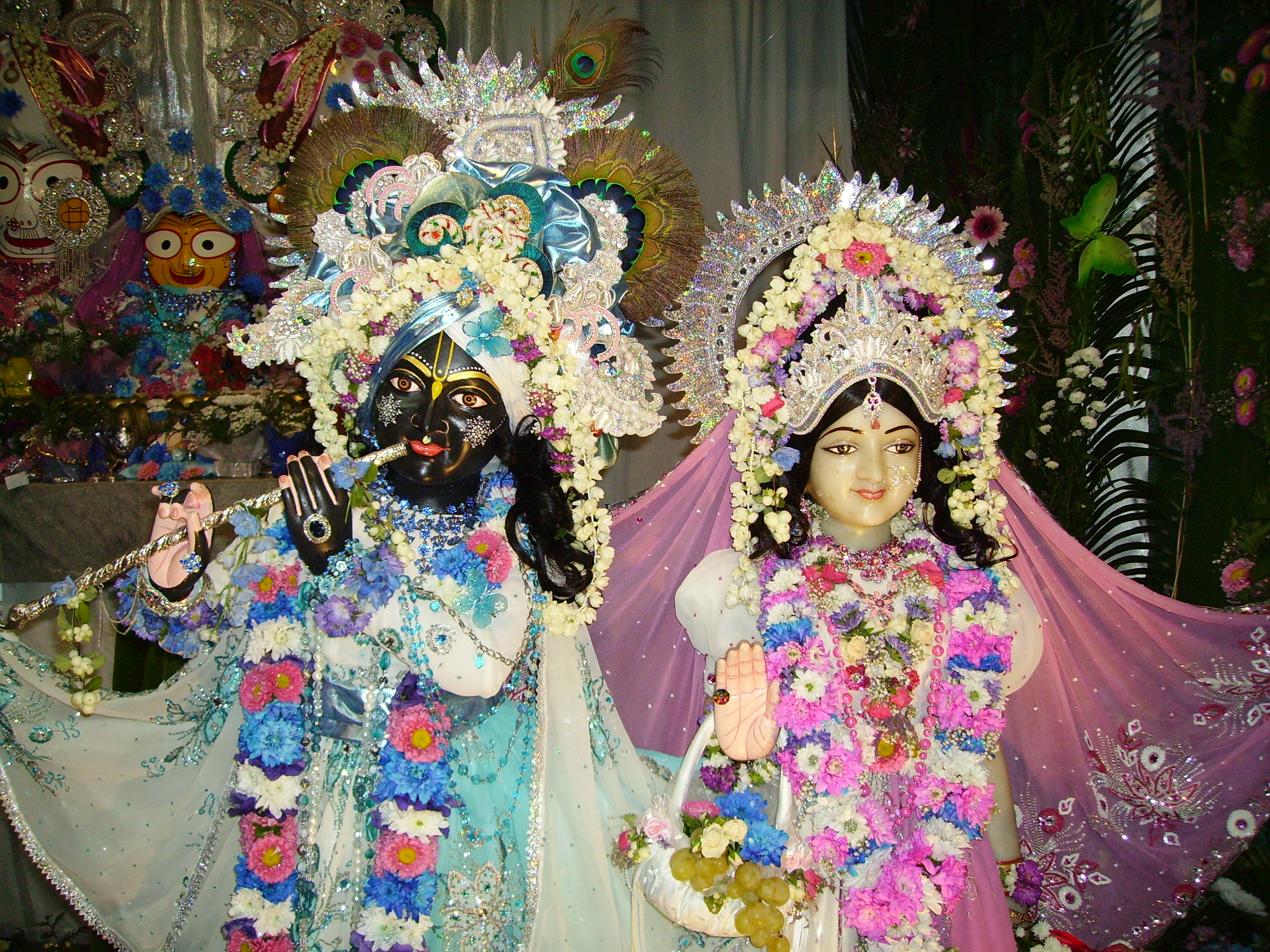
Radha-Paris-isvara in Paris, France

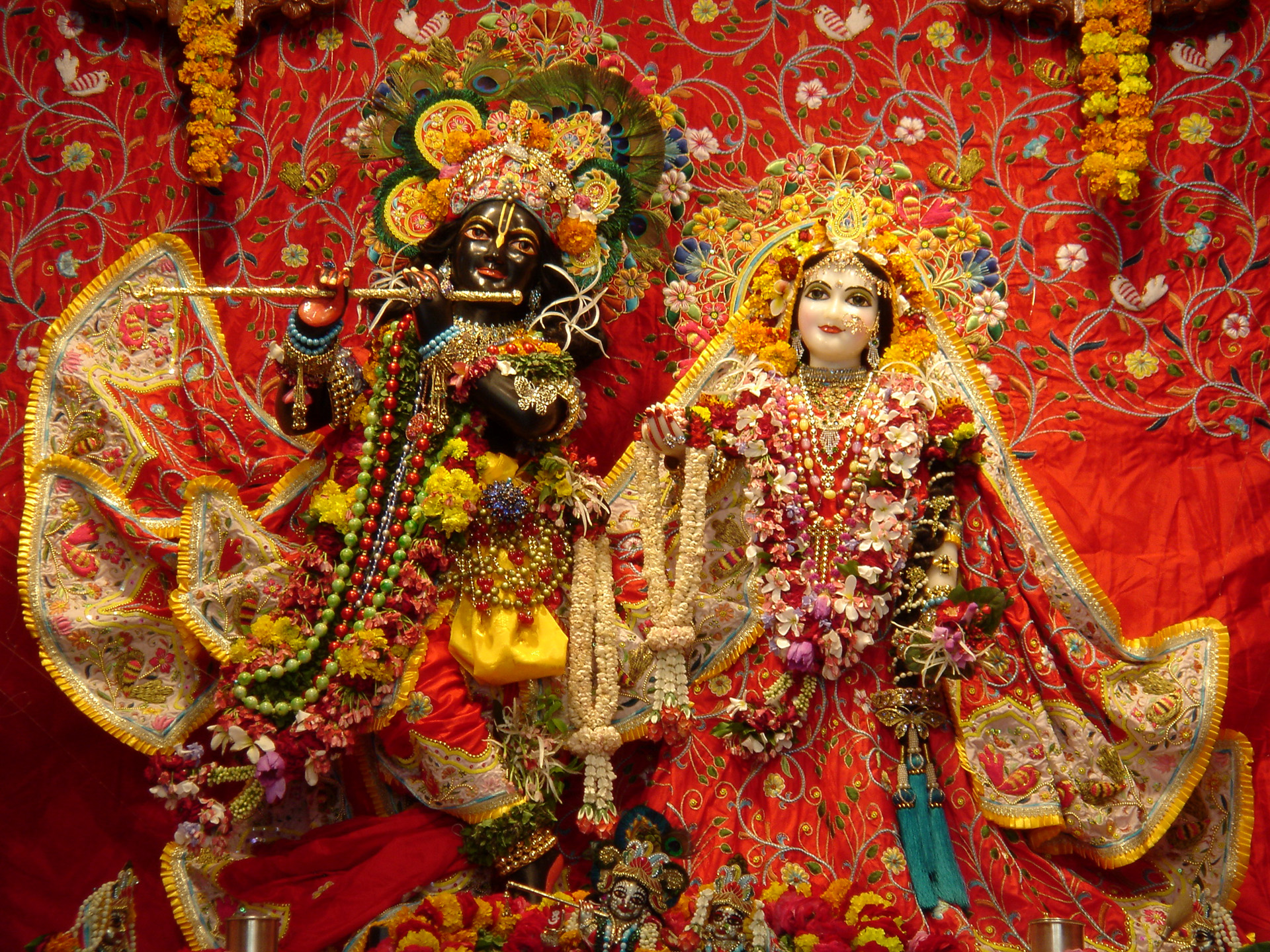
Radha-Shyamasundar in Vrindavan, India on Radhashtami

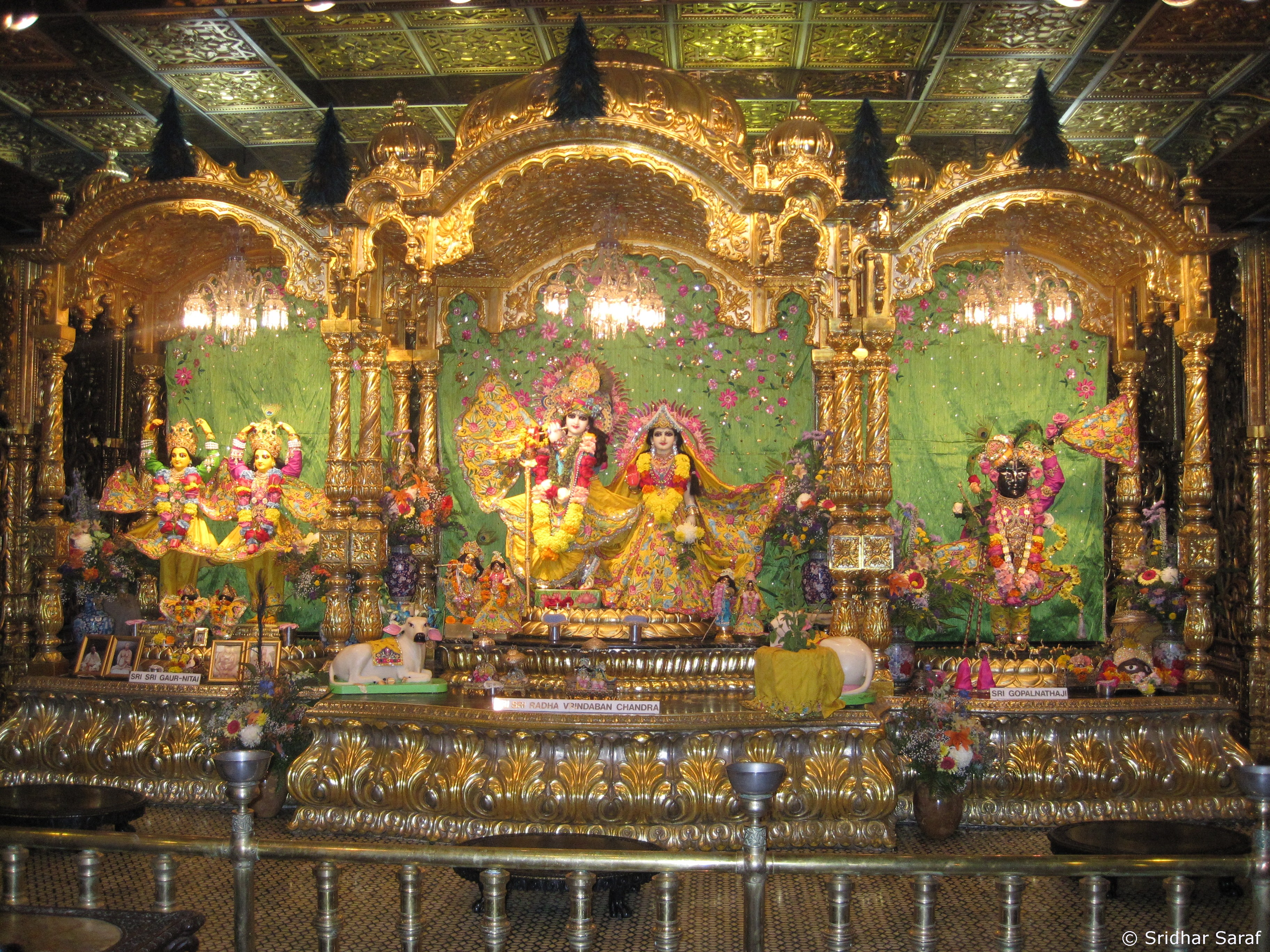
Gaura-Nitai (left), Radha-Vrindaban Chandra (center) and Sri Gopalnathaji (right) idols at New Vrindaban, United States

=== Nature of Radha ===
E. Burke Rochford Jr. notes that devotees worship marble or brass deities of Krishna and his consort Radharani on the altar.

Graham M. Schweig elucidates the theologically prescient nature of the romantic/divine love between Radha and Krishna in the context of the Rasa Lila from the Bhagvata Purana.

=== Nature of the Soul ===
In some Gaudiya traditions (including ISKCON), all souls have the innate ability to follow the supreme path of unconditional love and devotion (bhakti) to Krishna, which must first be transmitted by a qualified guru. The individual soul has an eternal spiritual identity which does not ultimately merge into the non-dual consciousness (Brahman) as believed by the monistic (Advaita) schools of Hinduism. Prabhupada most frequently offers Sanatana-dharma and Varnashrama dharma as more accurate names for the religious system which accepts Vedic authority.

The soul is considered to be of the same nature as Krishna yet separate. The soul reincarnates through the material world, which is considered to be an illusion or maya. Actions performed in one life will affect the next, a principle called karma. The end to the cycle of karma and reincarnation can be brought upon by the path of bhakti ("devotion to God"), which Prabhupada considers easier and superior to karma-yoga ("path of action") and jnana-yoga ("path of knowledge").

=== Guru ===
ISKCON, like many other Hindu sects, believes that a guru stands in a parampara or uninterupted succession of gurus stretching to God, particularly in this case from Bhaktivedanta to Bhaktisiddhanta to Chaitanya to Vyasa and ultimately to Krishna. Thus the guru acts as the sole channel through which the disciple can experience Krishna's grace, for which the disciple must surrender themself to their guru and behave submissively, humbly, and self-deprecating. Once accepting a guru, a disciple may never question the guru's teachings, with only the guru's godbrothers having the authority to scrutinze the guru's teachings and actions.

== Religious practices ==
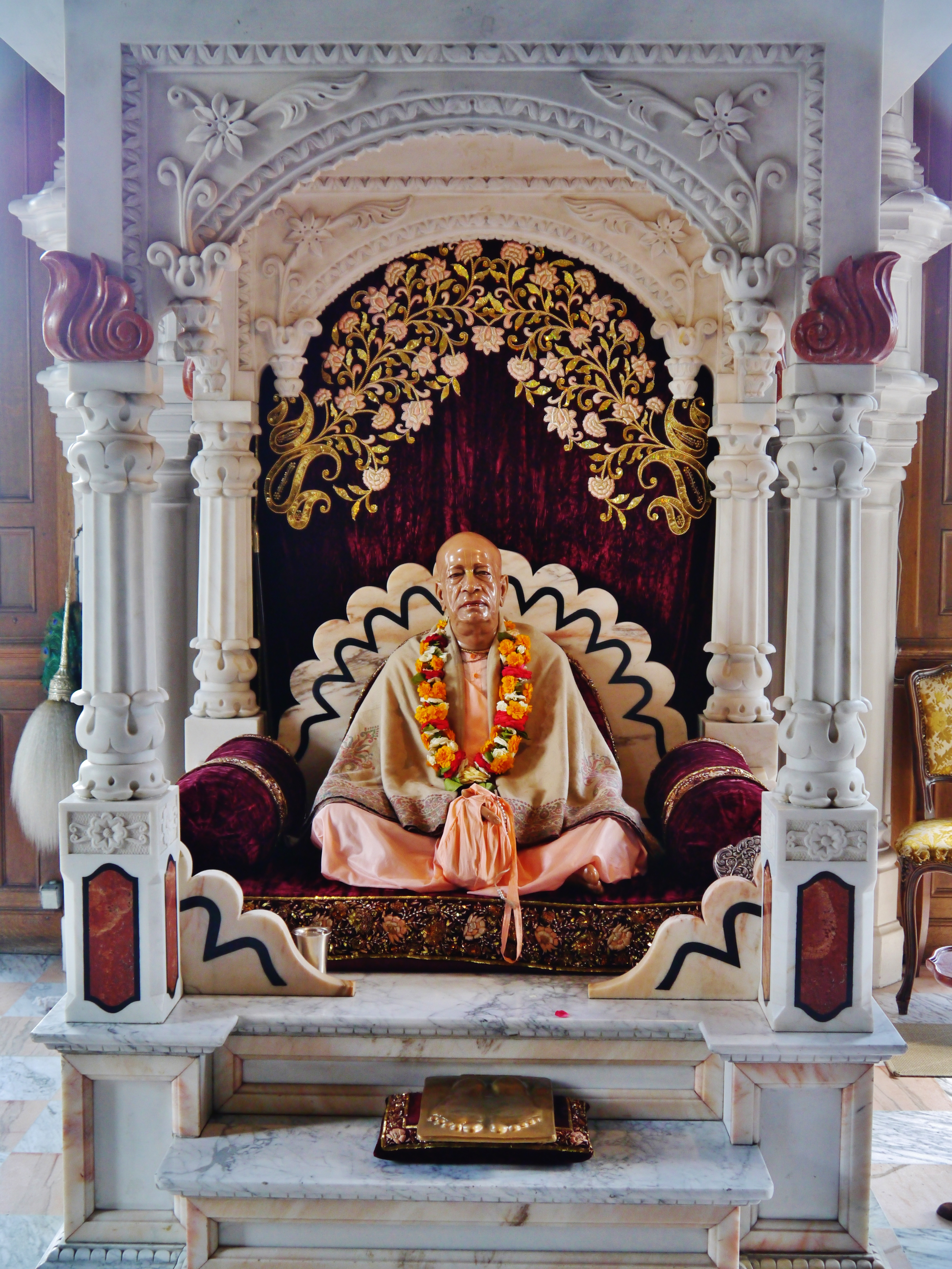
Statue of Prabhupada, the founder of ISKCON

Hare Krishna Ratha-Yatra through the streets of Boston, Massachusetts, US

In practice, an initiated devotee must follow the four regulative principles: no eating meat, eggs, or fish, no consuming intoxicants, not committing illicit sex, and no gambling. Additionally, a devotee must receive a new spiritual name and recite sixteen rounds of the Hare Krishna mantra on 108 japa beads daily (totaling 1,728 times a day which takes 1.5 hours). A devotee must additionally spend an hour a day reading Prabhupada's works, which convey his teachings in the English language. Daily worship begins at 04:30 for the first viewing of the temple deities, followed by two hours chanting the Hare Krishna mantra, then offerings to the guru, followed by prasadam which is the main meal. The day is then spent in a variety of activities in service to ISKCON.

=== Kirtan ===
The most famous and publicly recognizable ISKCON practice is kirtan, a congregational chanting or singing of the Hare Krishna mantra. Kirtan is both a way to express devotion to God and a way to attract newcomers to the movement. Devotees gather in public, in streets and parks, to sing the mantra accompanied by instruments like the mridanga, hand cymbals, and the harmonium. During the 1970s, ISKCON entered the public eye because of this practice. Devotees would sing, distribute books, and proselytize in airports and other public areas, sometimes obtrusively. Sankirtan continues throughout the world today, but in a less confrontational manner.

=== Japa ===
Japa is another important religious practice within ISKCON and Gaudiya Vaishnavism. It is the meditative practice of repeatedly chanting the names of Krishna on a set of prayer beads. Its believers chant the Hare Krishna mantra:

Hare Krishna Hare Krishna
Krishna Krishna Hare Hare
Hare Rama Hare Rama
Rama Rama Hare Hare

The mantra is chanted by initiated on 108 rosary beads a total of 16 rounds every day. According to Prabhupada, it is unnecessary to understand the mantra or its meaning because by simply chanting the mantra spiritual benefits and ecstatic love are automatically rendered.

Despite the simple explanation, Hinduism has a long intellectual tradition of "sonic theology" or sacred sound. Since the Vedic period, sacred speech has been considered to render results. In Sanskrit linguistics the theory of varnavada states that it is unnecessary to understand the Vedas to obtain their results (as long as they are correctly pronounced); this theory was coopted by theistic Shaiva, Vaishnava, and Shakta traditions for their own non-Vedic mantras. Vaishnava texts and sampradayas affirmed and promoted the use of mantras; the Gaudiya Vaishnava tradition in particular emphasised the loud, audible chanting of Krishna's names. The Hare Krishna mantra first appears in the Kali-Saṇṭāraṇa Upaniṣad (c. A.D. 1500).

=== Arati and Temple Deity Worship ===
Arati is also an important tenet (also called puja) of ISKCON. During arati, devotees offer water, incense, a fire lamp, and flowers to a murti, a sacred statue or image of Krishna. This is accompanied by prayers and devotional songs called bhajans. Practitioners may perform arati at their own home or congregate at a temple to join in the ceremony. Along with this worship, devotees will bathe the murti, dress it, offer it food, and even put it to sleep. By doing arati and serving the murti, devotees aim to deepen their relationship with Krishna.

ISKCON devotees meet regularly (typically on Sunday at a program known as the Sunday Feast) to worship deities, listen to discourses by senior devotees, participate in kirtan and eat sanctified offered food prasadam. Devotees place great emphasis on listening to spiritual discourses, believing them to be a key role in spiritual advancement.

The Vaishnava religion follows a formal ritual system of worship which was unknown to the modern twentieth century non-Vaishnava, non-Indian, non-Brahmin ISKCON converts of the first generation. Prabhupada wrote a summary study of Rupa Goswami's Bhakti-rasamrita-sindhu which dictates vaidhi bhakti sadhana ("regulated devotional practice"). The "Bhakti-rasamrita-sindhu," along with Gopala Bhatta's and Sanatana Goswami's "Hari-bhakti-vilasa," gives a detailed treatment of how to perform deity worship, based on the authoritative Tantric Vaishnava Pancharata Agamas and Puranas. Prabhupada, relying on certain statements in the Bhagavata Purana and "Chaitanya Charitamrita," considered non-Indian westerners worthy of performing temple service so long as they adhered to the formal rules of worship. ISKCON bases its worship on the three main temple centers important to Gaudiya Vaishnavism: the Jagannath Temple, Puri (which disallows "non-Hindu" western ISKCON devotees from entering but whose Ratha Yatra is replicated by ISKCON), Vrindavan and its Radharaman Temple (whose goswamis strongly opposed Bhaktisiddhanta Saraswati's practice of Brahmin initiation but from which some modern liberal goswamis have taught ISKCON disciples in rituals), and Nabadwip, West Bengal (where historically Gaudiya idols and sites of worship have been small but since Bhaktisiddhanta Saraswati has been the construction of large images and complexes).

ISKCON has some innovations in its core temple traditions. Prabhupada ordered the rock-single "Govindam Prayers," arranged by George Harrison and whose lead singer is a woman, to be played at every morning prayer. Prabhupada also gave Brahmin initiation to women and allowed them to serve as temple priests, whereas in historical Indian tradition the temple was restricted to male priests (in Indian ISKCON temples, this tradition is respected).

=== Four Regulative Principles ===
During initiation (diksha) ISKCON devotees vow to follow four basic rules and regulations.

- The consumption of only lacto-vegetarian diet (abstinence from meat, fish, eggs).
- Prohibition against consuming any intoxicants (i.e., onion, garlic, coffee, caffeinated drinks, tea, tobacco cigarettes, drugs and alcohol)
- Prohibition against gambling
- Prohibition against sexual intercourse in terms of engaging in illicit sexual activity and relationships outside of marriage.

=== Celebrated festivals ===
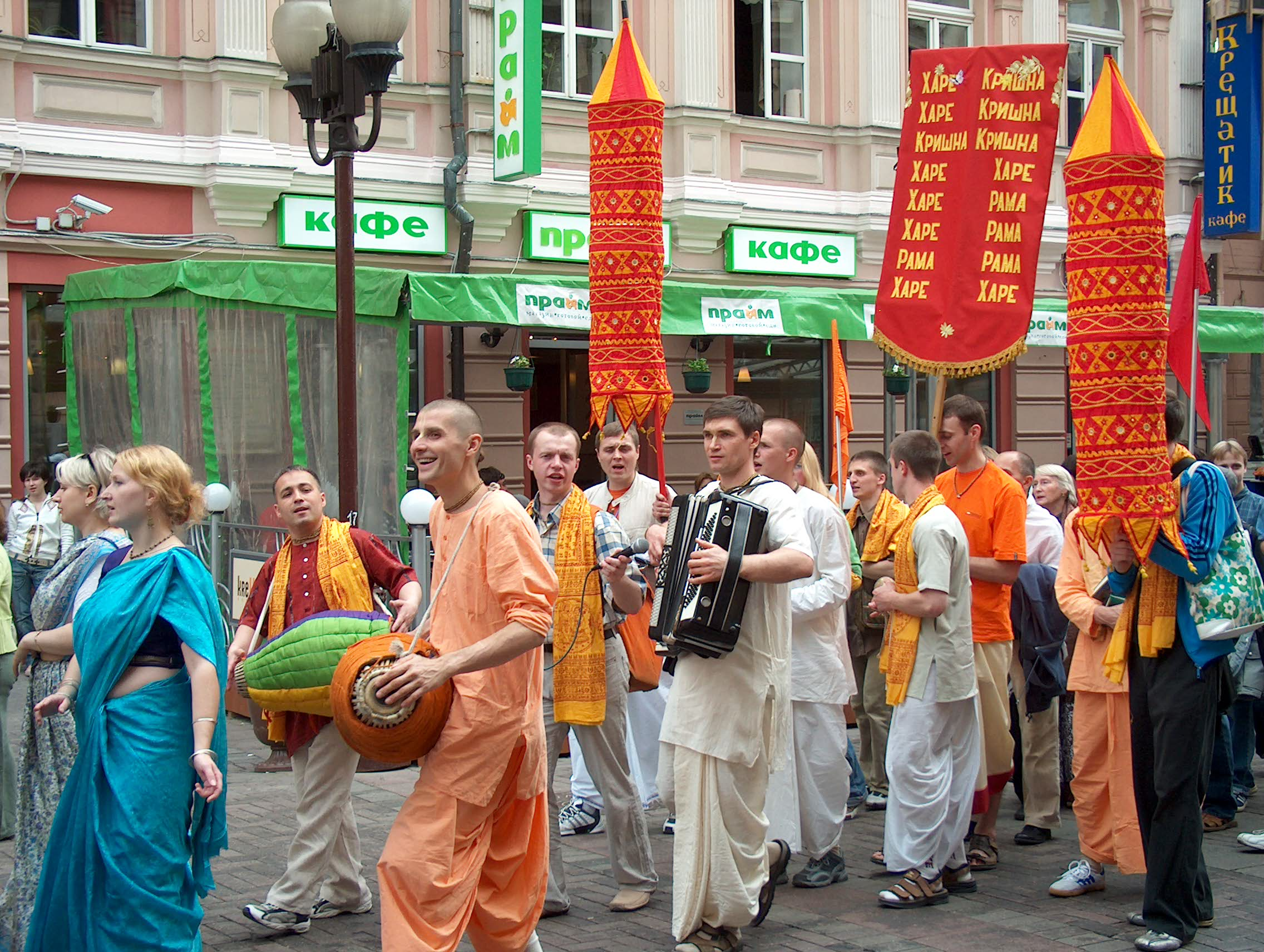
Hare Krishna street show on Arbat Street in Moscow, Russia, 2009

Besides weekly gatherings, devotees within the ISKCON movement celebrate a diverse array of Hindu festivals, including Janmashtami, Radhastami, Diwali, Gaura Purnima, Ekadasi, Holi, Rama Navami, and Gita Jayanti.

The Ratha Yatra Festival of Chariots is an annual parade whereby devotees chant and dance on the street, pulling a chariot with the deities of Jagannatha, Balabhadra, and Subhadra behind them. This public procession is typically followed by performances and free vegetarian food.

=== Public preaching ===
ISKCON advocates preaching. Members spread Krishna consciousness primarily by singing the Hare Krishna mantra in public places and by selling Indian spiritual books transcribed from their original languages and published in English by the movement's founder, Prabhupada.

A study conducted by the American researcher E. Burke Rochford Jr. at the University of California found that there are four types of contact between those in ISKCON and prospective members: individually motivated contact, contact made with members in public areas, contact made through personal connections, and contact with sympathizers of the movement who encourage people to join.

=== Initiation and Society ===
Prior to initiation as a Hare Krishna disciple, a devotee must be adhering to the lifestyle principles of the movement. After the Initiation into the Holy Name, a devotee fully commits his or herself to Krishna consciousness, and becomes either a brahmachari/bhramacharini ("celibate") or a grihasta ("householder"). After several years as an initiated disciple, one may undergo "brahmin initiation" which allows disciples to act as priests in ISKCON temples. After "Brahmin initiation", males are entitled to take sannyasa ("renunciation"), a complete detachment from the physical world. Men and women try not to intermingle, as ISKCON theology opposes illusory attachment to sexual relationships.

Hopkins states that the universalism of Vaishnava devotionalism has allowed it to be popular within India and the Western world. According to Hopkins, Vaishnava devotional texts and the Mahabharata (including the Bhagavad Gita) state that varna and social status are based on personal attributes and qualities, not birth as in the orthodox Hindu tradition.

=== Dress ===
Traditionally, Hare Krishna disciples were characterized for their public use of Indian dress on the street (e.g. shikha, dhoti, and saffron robe for men and sari for women); this dress is now only found among disciples living in communes and the majority of lay members do not wear this dress.

== Organizational structure ==
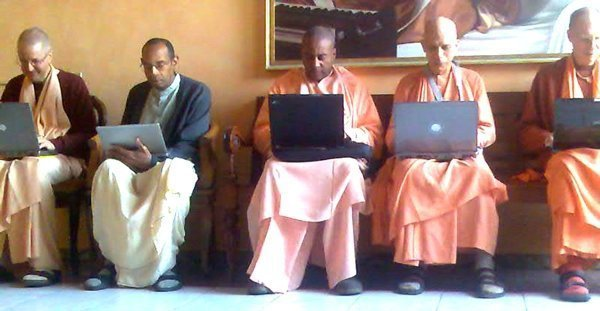
Photo of GBC commissioners during a conference in Prabhupadadesh, Italy, 2003

Prabhupada spent much of the last decade of his life setting up the institution of ISKCON.

The Governing Body Commission (or GBC) is the managerial authority of ISKCON. Created by Bhaktivedanta in 1970, it meets annually. In a document Direction of Management written on 28 July 1970 Prabhupada appointed twelve members to the commission, all of them non-sannyasi, including Satsvarupa dasa Goswami, Hansadutta Swami, and Tamala Krishna Goswami. The letter outlined the purposes of the commission: improving the standard of temple management, the spread of Krishna consciousness, the distribution of books and literature, the opening of new centers and the education of the devotees. GBC has since grown in size to include 48 senior members from the movement who make decisions based on consensus of opinion.

In 1982, the GBC began the slow process of adding new gurus to the original eleven. In 1983 the GBC was announced to be the highest ecclesiastical authority of ISKCON. In 1985 the decision was made to lower the standard of living for ISKCON leadership. After much heated discussion, the GBC decided to "relieve" a number of leaders and new leaders were selected. The young leaders of the GBC sought the advice of one of Prabhupada's Gaudiya godbrothers, and endeavored to become more integrated in the broader Hindu community.

After years of discussion and reforms, a general consensus emerged to accept women as leaders in ISKCON, overriding the former GBC supposition that "unprotected, 'women leaders become subject to various forms of mistreatment and abuse'". In 1998, Malati Devi Dasi became the first woman appointed to the GBC.

Kirtanananda Swami, or Swami Bhaktipada, a leader of ISKCON, was expelled from the organisation in 1987 for various deviations. He was the leader of New Vrindaban, the largest and most famous Hare Krishna community in the United States at that time. In 1996, Kirtanananda pleaded guilty to one count of racketeering and after serving 8 years of a 20-year prison sentence was subsequently released in 2004. Previously, in 1991, the jury had found him guilty of racketeering and mail fraud. These convictions were later overturned on appeal, only to result in the later retrial.

=== Succession of teachings ===
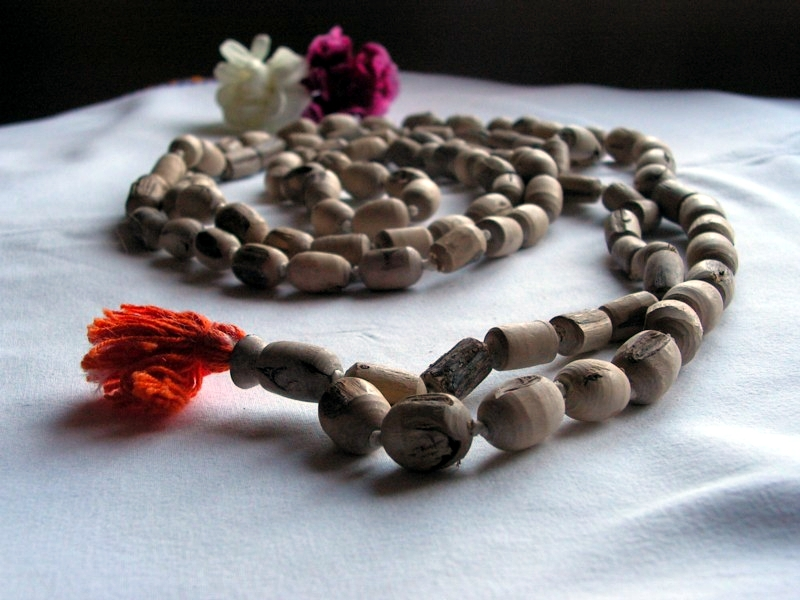
Chanting beads, normally of tulsi wood given by an ISKCON guru at the initiation to an ISKCON devotee

=== Women's roles ===
According to ISKCON theology, the souls of men and women are of the same nature; furthermore, according to Knott, all devotees follow a "feminine approach to spirituality" in emulation of Radha. However, souls still inhabit human bodies which have a unique dharma according to varna, ashrama, and gender. According to Knott, Prabhupada preached that upon becoming Vaishnavis (female Vaishnavas), female devotees became an "analytic exception" to the nature of women and were as empowered as male devotees. ISKCON's views on women are varied due to interconnected views on correct dharma, which it divides into three kinds: "Vedic", "Hindu", and "Krishna Conscious". According to ISKCON, in "Vedic" varnashrama dharma women served the men in their lives who protected them. ISKCON views "Hindu" dharma as a failed attempt to replicate this system which ended up with women being oppressed. The "Krishna Conscious" or bhagavata dharma view is that men and women should both serve Krishna as equals.

Women's roles are a controversial issue within ISKCON, and its members have strongly divergent opinions regarding the interpretation of Prabhupada's teachings on gender roles.

Since women are the most respected position in Vedic culture, women within the Hare Krishna community are all viewed with reverence, especially by celibate male monks, also known as brahmacharis. "Mataji" (lit. 'Mother') is a term of respect for women in ISKCON, and is often prefixed to the Sanskrit name they receive in initiation. Unmarried women are also referred to in this term.

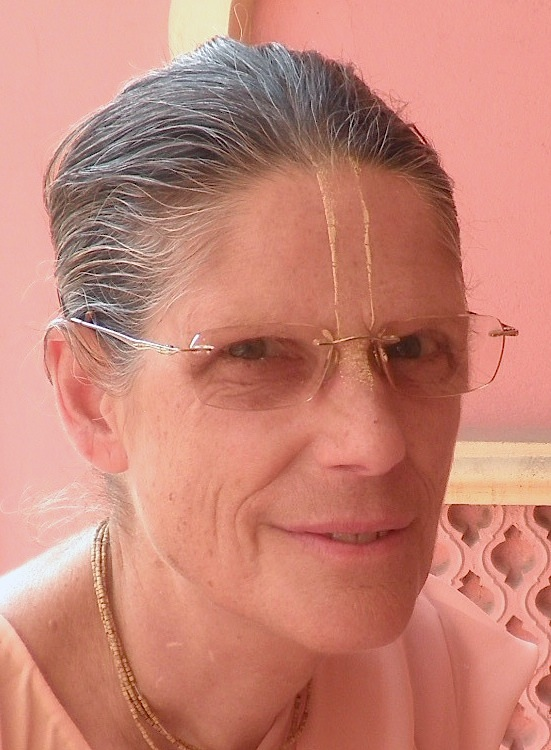
Malati Devi Dasi is the first woman appointed to the ISKCON Governing Body Commission (GBC).

=== Office for Child Protection ===
In 1998, following decades of abuse allegations, ISKCON published an exposé of widespread physical, emotional and sexual abuse of children in the group's boarding schools in the United States and India in the 1970s and 1980s. The report stated that the monks and young devotees caring for the children had no training in the task and often resented having to perform it. At a meeting in 1996, former young members testified that they had been regularly beaten at school, denied medical care, and sexually molested and raped.

In 2002, a suit for $900 million was filed in Texas State Court by alleged victims of abuse in ISKCON boarding schools. ISKCON later filed for Chapter 11 bankruptcy protection. The eventual 2008 settlement in what became known as the Turley Case was $15 million.

== Kirtan and musical traditions ==
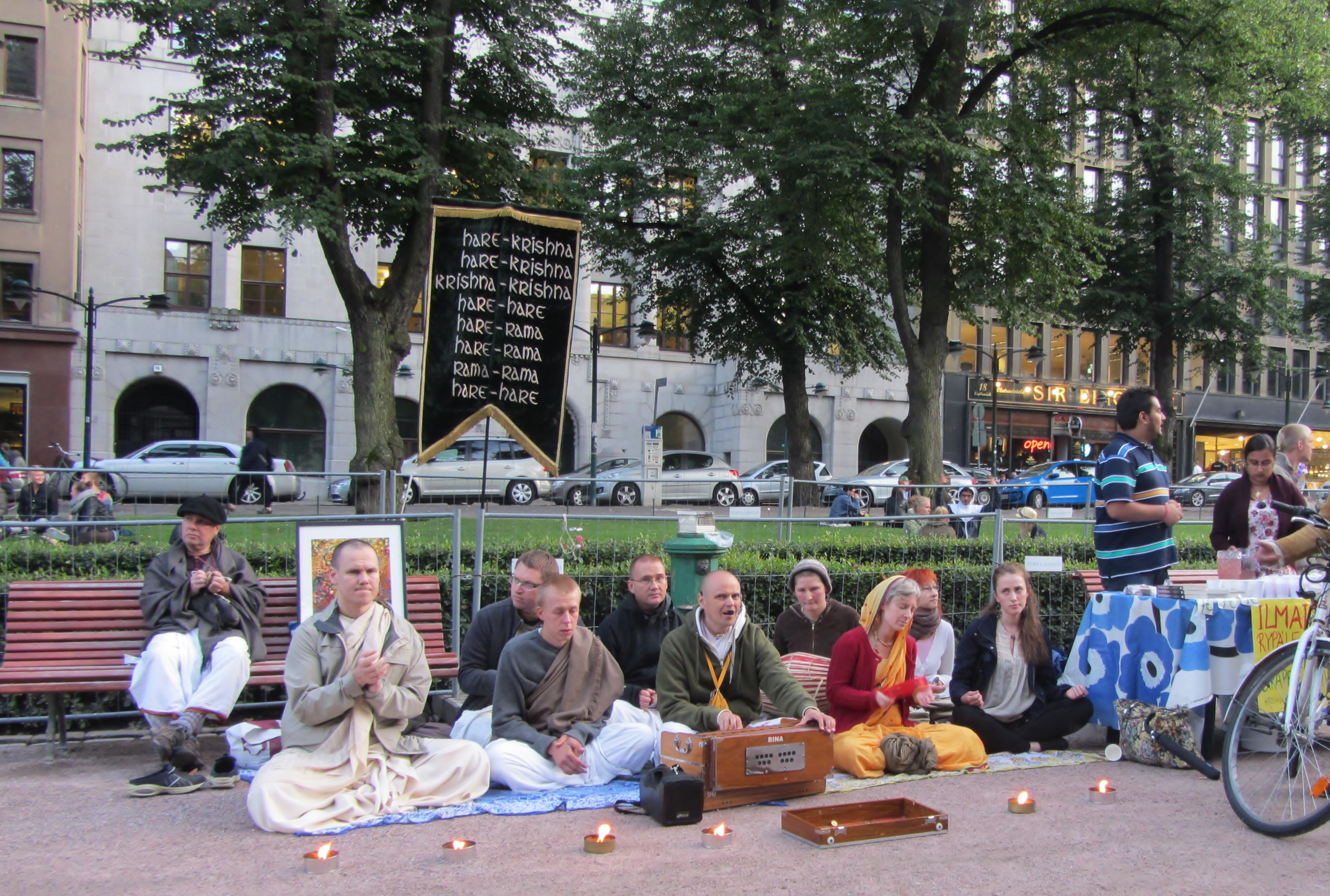
Hare Krishna devotees singing at the Esplanadi Park in Helsinki, Finland in August 2014

The practice of mantra chanting and devotional singing, also known as Kirtan, is prominent in the ISKCON movement. Dedicated kirtan festivals are held annually around the world, such as the Sadhu Sanga Retreat in Boone, North Carolina, US Kirtan 50 in Dallas, Texas, US, and Radhadesh Mellows, in Durbuy, Belgium. Notable kirtaneers include Jahnavi Harrison, Gaura Vani, and the Mayapuris, who have all released Kirtan albums. Kirtan sessions are also held outside of temple settings, including at a local university "Bhakti Clubs", mantra lounges, and at a yoga and wellness festivals.

Full theatrical performances have been produced based on the Vedic theologies. Prominent performance companies include Viva Kultura and Vande Arts.

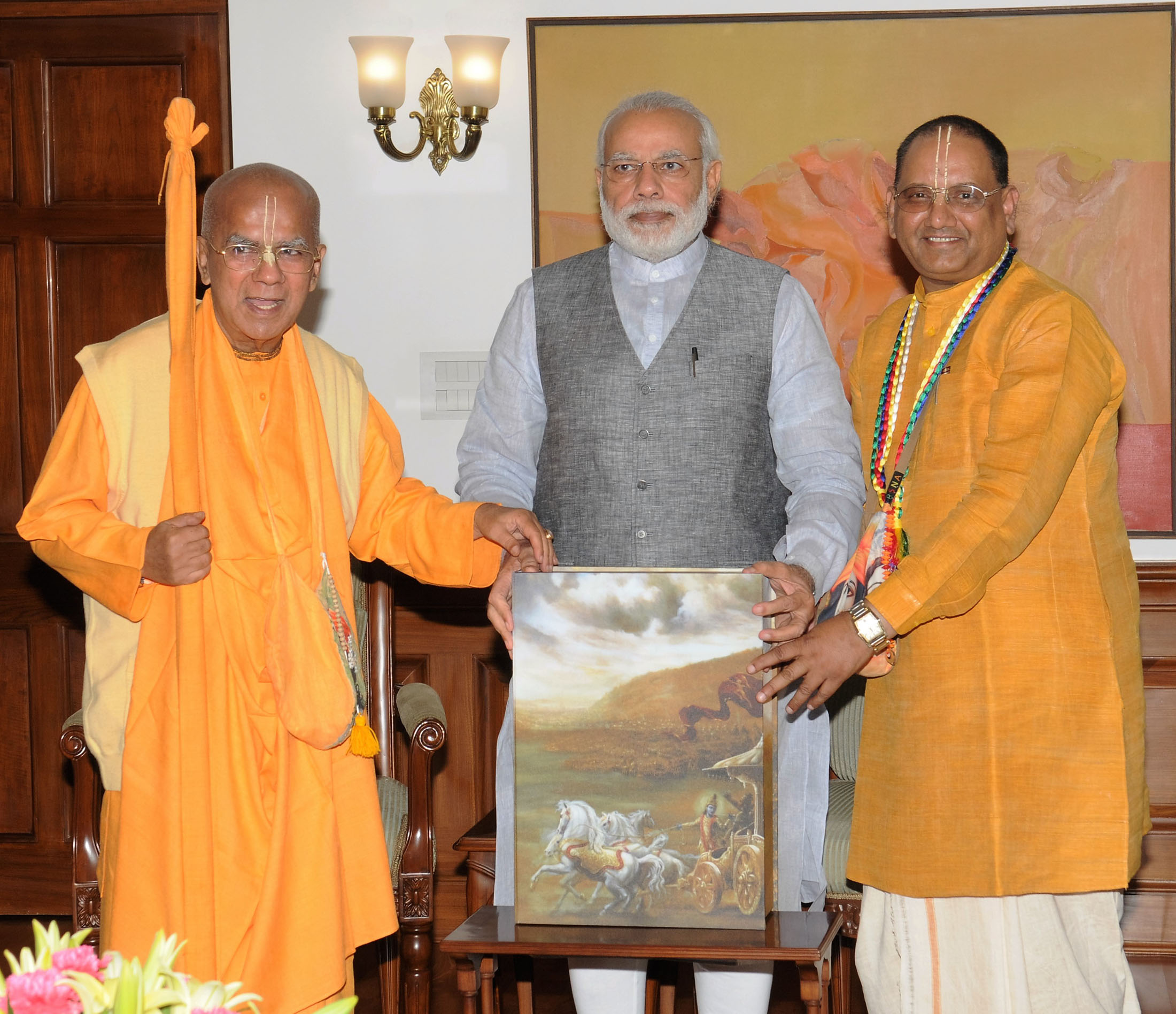
The Head, ISKCON, Shri Gopal Krishna Goswami Maharaja calls on India's Prime Minister, Narendra Modi, in New Delhi on 18 March 2016.

The Hare Krishna mantra appears in some famous songs, such as former Beatle George Harrison's 1970 hit "My Sweet Lord". John Lennon included the phrase "Hare Krishna" in his lyrics to "Give Peace a Chance" and the Beatles' 1967 track "I Am the Walrus". The backing vocalists also sing the phrase in Ringo Starr's 1971 hit "It Don't Come Easy", written with the help of Harrison, although the words were mixed low on the released version.

Of the four Beatles, only Harrison fully embraced Krishna Consciousness. He also provided financial support for ISKCON's UK branch and in 1973 purchased Bhaktivedanta Manor for their temple compound. Harrison enjoyed a warm friendship with Prabhupada, who provided the inspiration for Harrison songs such as "Living in the Material World".

In the 1980s, underground New York City hardcore punk band the Cro-Mags included Hare Krishna members and made references to Krishna Consciousness. By the early 1990s, an entire underground Krishnacore subgenre was established with other New York hardcore bands like Shelter and 108.

In 2020, Willow Smith and Jahnavi Harrison collaborated on the song "Surrender (Krishna Keshava"), and the album "RISE", featuring ancient sacred songs from India with Sanskrit lyrics.

== Dietary practices (vegetarianism) ==
Vegetarianism is one of the four tenets of ISKCON. Due to Prabhupada's focus on food distribution, many ISKCON devotees have opened vegan and vegetarian eateries. Not all restaurants opened by ISKCON members are officially affiliated with ISKCON, although many Govindas' restaurants or catering businesses operate out of the main temple center.

The ISKCON followers refer to their diet as 'Krishnatarian'. According to them "A Krishnatarian meal is one which is cooked using fresh, vegetarian ingredients (excluding onion, garlic, red lentils and mushrooms) and milk products which is cooked by an Iskcon follower and offered to their main deities before it is distributed and consumed."

== Demographics ==
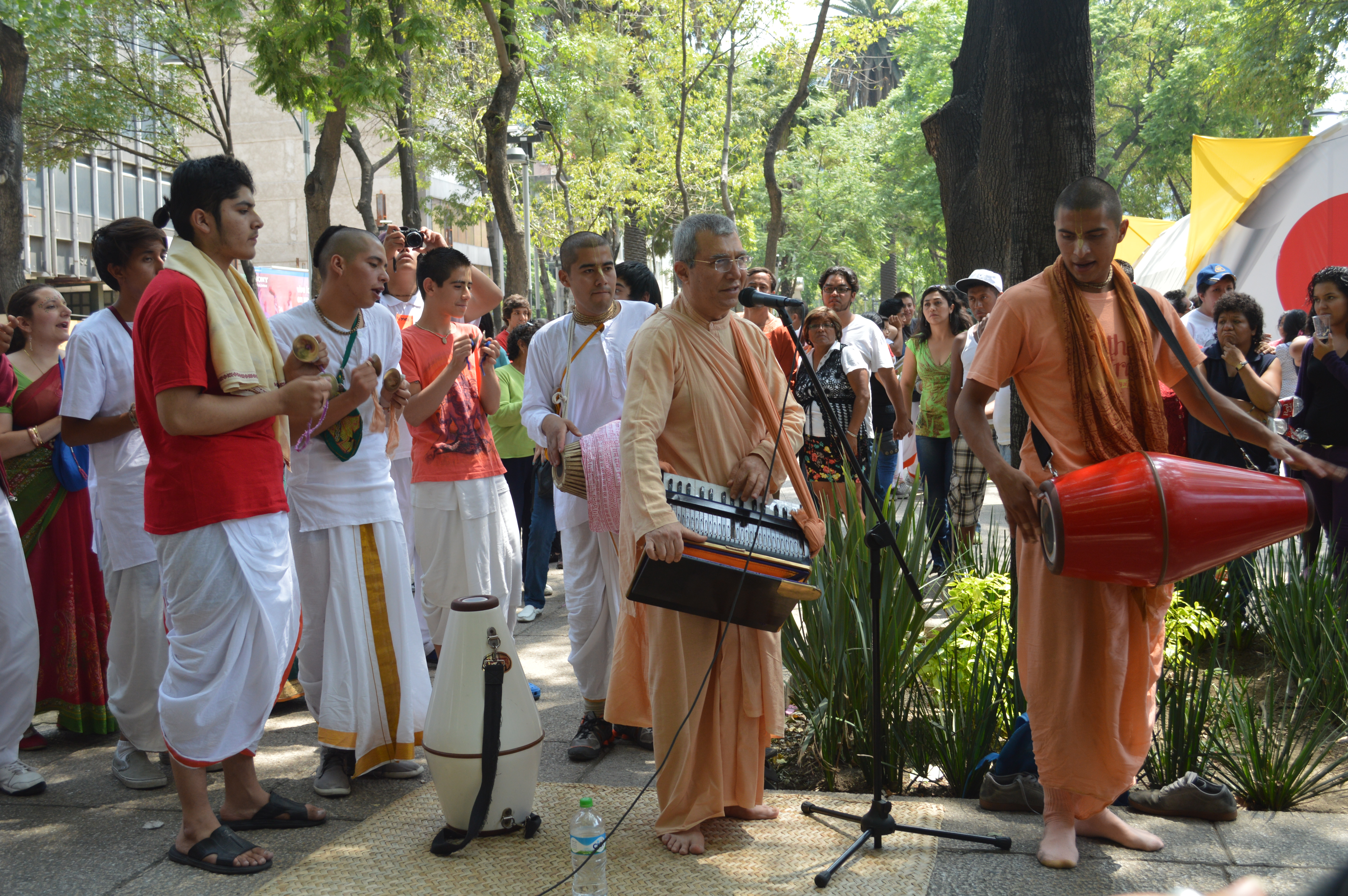
Hare Krishna musicians in Mexico City

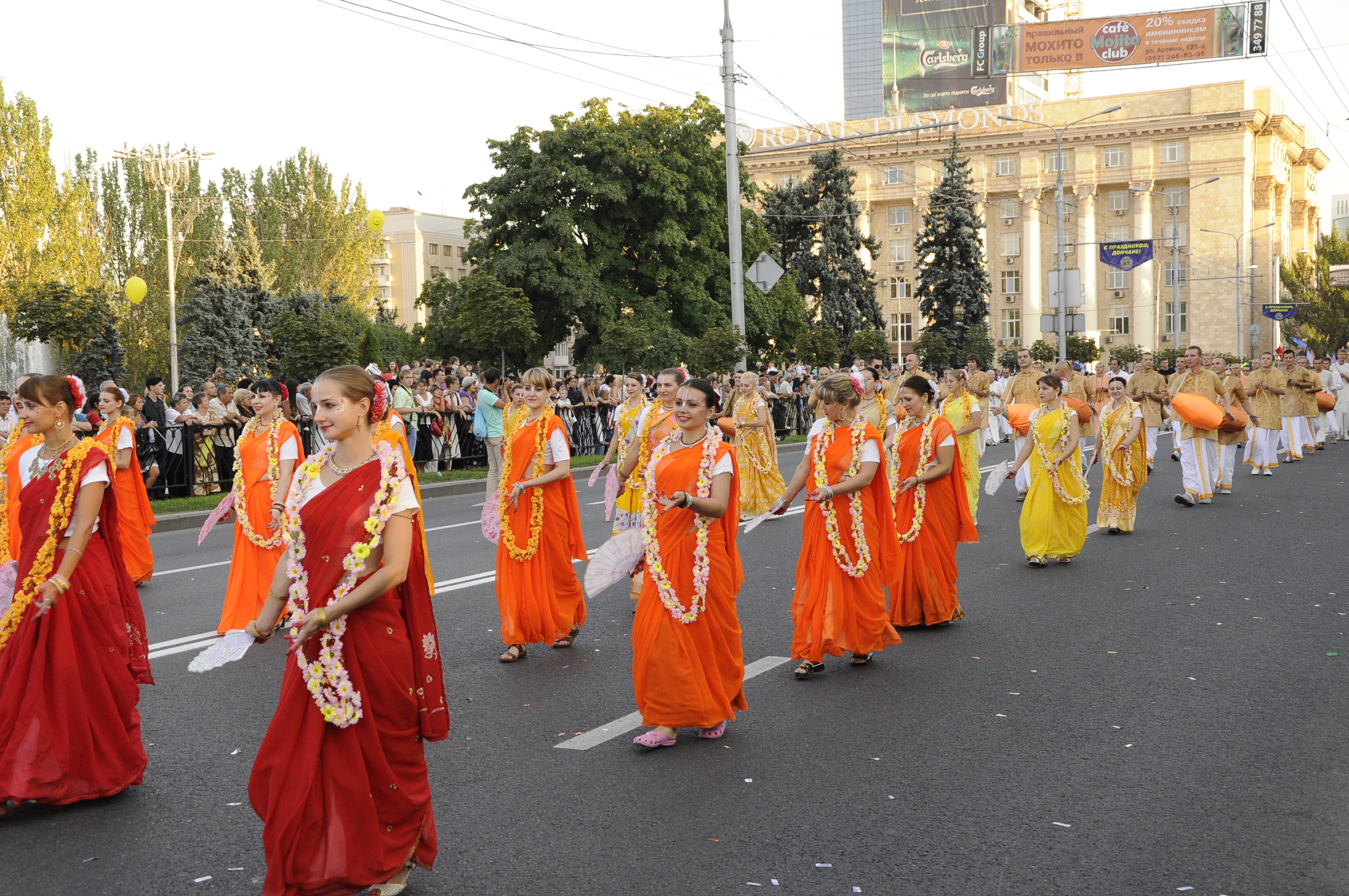
Hare Krishna street show in Donetsk, Ukraine, 2011

ISKCON claims to have around one million congregational members worldwide, the majority in India, with 15,000 in the UK.

In the West it "has a relatively small number of followers", estimated at "a few thousand full-time practitioners", but those showing interest in its activities might number into the "tens of thousands."

After considerable success in the West due to the counterculture of the 1960s, ISKCON lost its momentum from the early 1980s onward, "facing a sharp decline in membership and in financial resources" in North America and in Western Europe, while in the late 1990s the situation began to deteriorate in Eastern Europe as well. In 2000, it was estimated that only 750–900 members were residing in ISKCON centres in the United States. Since then, ISKCON has depended on the Indian diaspora to revitalise the movement; in most North American congregations Indian members make up 80% of the numbers.

== Controversies and allegations ==
=== Allegations of being a cult ===
Some anti-cult movements have scrutinised ISKCON and described it as a cult. Larry Shinn, who studied ISKCON communities and the anti-cult movement, noted that media and anti-cult reports of ISKCON often relied on "sensationalised exaggeration" and "fearful and unsubstantiated Big Lie" about new religious movements like ISKCON. While acknowledging misconducts within the movement, he emphasized that "these excesses are just that, and are not typical" of most devotees, concluding that ISKCON represents an authentic Hindu devotional tradition rather than a "brainwashing cult".

==== People v. Murphy ====
In a 1976 case, People v. Murphy, a grand jury indicted Iskcon, Inc. and the president of an ISKCON temple for unlawful imprisonment. The parents of two Hare Krishna members alleged that ISKCON had imprisoned their children through brainwashing, but the court dismissed the case, ruling that the two members had freely followed the tenets of their chosen faith. The case was decided on the basis of the First Amendment upholding freedom of religion, namely that "'[T]he Hare Krishna religion is a bona fide religion with roots in India that go back thousands of years."

==== George v. International Society for Krishna Consciousness of California ====
In a 1984 case, George v. International Society for Krishna Consciousness of California was a lawsuit that resulted in a mixed judgment. Marcia and Robin George accused ISKCON of kidnapping Robin via brainwashing and sued ISKCON for false imprisonment, intentional infliction of emotional distress, libel, and the wrongful death of Robin's father based on stress caused by the alleged circumstances. A California state appellate court dismissed Robin's claims for false imprisonment, libel, and intentional infliction of emotional distress, but upheld jury verdicts in favor of Marcia for intentional infliction of emotional distress and wrongful death.

=== Child abuse in boarding schools ===
In the 1990s, ISKCON faced accusations of child abuse, and its leaders acknowledged physical, emotional and sexual abuse of children who were sent to live in the rural communities' boarding schools in the United States and India in the 1970s and 1980s. Sociologist of religion E. Burke Rochford argues that a culture of abuse in ISKCON schools arose in part because of renunciant leaders' subtle denigration of the value of householders and children.

According to a suit filed in 2000 by 44 ex-students of the schools, students had been beaten, raped, scrubbed with wire wool until they bled and denied medical care for malaria, hepatitis and broken bones. The suit also alleged children were moved from school to school without parental consent.

An internal 1998 non-random survey reported that a substantial minority of students in boarding schools experienced sexual abuse, physical abuse, emotional mistreatment, and child neglect. According to Wolf, ISKCON's schools developed an environment amenable to child abuse from the 1970s through the early 1990s due in part to limited contact between children and parents and no bar to entry or adequate training for teachers. ISKCON considered children born in devotee families as automatically spiritually pure by virtue of birth, but when children grew up and did not exhibit the appropriate characteristics ISKCON leadership labelled them as "materialists" unworthy of attention. Additionally, ISKCON's focus on the renuciate lifestyle and non-attachment drove many parents to disregard their children's needs. In the 1990s reports of child abuse emerged as the first generation of devotee children became adults. Several safety regulations and subcommittees, such as ISKCON Resolve and the ISKCON Child Protection Office, have been developed since these allegations to ensure that the legal rights of devotees, as well as their health and safety, are protected. Devotee trust in ISKCON's leadership was eroded and many fault GBC leaders for failing to take adequate responsibility for the abuse.

=== Relations with Indonesian Hindu authorities ===
ISKCON has maintained an active presence in Indonesia since the 1970s, particularly on the island of Bali, where most of the country's Hindu population resides. The movement was introduced following a 1973 visit by founder A. C. Bhaktivedanta Swami Prabhupada. During the 1970s, the Bhaktivedanta Book Trust in Jakarta distributed Indonesian translations of ISKCON literature, initially receiving favorable comment from some members of the Parisada Hindu Dharma Indonesia (PHDI). According to Ravinjay Kuckreja, writing in Religió: Jurnal Studi Agama-agama (2022), early enthusiasm among Balinese Hindus gave way to opposition in 1984 when the Indonesian Attorney General banned ISKCON publications and activities for "disturbing public order" during President Suharto’s New Order period. The decree (No. KEP-107/J.A/5/1984) also closed ISKCON's publisher and book distributor, citing risks to internal Hindu harmony. The ban was lifted after Indonesia's 1998 political reforms, and ISKCON reorganized nationally under the name Sampradaya Kesadaran Krishna Indonesia (SAKKHI). A rival group, ISKCON-Indonesia, also formed in Denpasar under Damodara Pandit, prompting legal and organizational disputes until The ISKCON Association was later recognized by PHDI as the movement's national council. Scholars have estimated that ISKCON's Indonesian membership numbers roughly 1,500 initiated devotees.

Kuckreja notes that cultural and theological differences have continued between ISKCON's Gaudiya Vaishnava teachings and local Balinese Hindu practice, which is largely Shaivite and monistic. In 2020, Bali's Majelis Desa Adat and PHDI issued a decree restricting "non-Balinese Hindu sects" (sampradaya non-dresta Bali) from conducting worship in traditional villages. The decree affected ISKCON and other pan-Hindu movements such as the Sai Baba organization. Observers linked the regulation to cultural policies promoted by Governor Wayan Koster, including national legislator Arya Wedakarna, who had expressed support for ISKCON, faced criticism from some Balinese groups. Kuckreja interprets the regulation as part of broader efforts to preserve Balinese religious identity, while describing ISKCON's imported rituals and attire as often perceived locally as culturally inappropriate. ISKCON representatives have denied causing unrest and have emphasized their recognition by Indonesia's Ministry of Religious Affairs and human-rights law. In 2021, one Balinese ISKCON group filed a complaint with the National Commission on Human Rights (Komnas HAM) concerning restrictions on their worship activities, and the issue was later mentioned in the U.S. Department of State’s 2020 Report on International Religious Freedom.

== Legal battles and persecution in various countries ==
In Russia, ISKCON devotees face multiple legal hurdles under anti-extremism and anti-missionary laws. These included a judicial attempt in 2011 in Tomsk to ban Bhagavad Gita As It Is as extremist material, which a district court dismissed on appeal on 28 December 2011. In Sarajevo, Bosnia and Herzegovina, on April 19 1996, ISKCON members taking part in a procession suffered a 'bloody attack' by as they walked past a mosque during Friday prayers. Many members of the procession, which consisted of around sixty people, suffered 'serious physical injuries'.

In Bangladesh, ISKCON faced intensified persecution during the anti-Hindu violence of 2024. In November 2024, authorities arrested ex-ISKCON leader Chinmoy Krishna Das on sedition charges and froze the bank accounts of 17 ISKCON figures, while Islamic extremists demanded a nationwide ban on ISKCON and threatened to kill Hindus if the demand was not met. ISKCON members were allegedly linked to two violences in Hazari Lane and Kotwali in Chittagong in the same month. A petition filed in the High Court to ban ISKCON's activities was dismissed on 28 November 2024, but attacks on temples and devotees continued. ISKCON chief in the country claimed that call to ban his organization was due to its "role in unifying Hindu resistance against forced conversions and land grabbing".

Singapore has banned ISKCON's activities since the 1970s. It has been designated as an "unregistered and undesirable society" under the Societies Act. As part of broader controls on religious groups considered to be proselytizing, their public worship, preaching, and membership activities are prohibited.

In China, while not explicitly banned, ISKCON has faced significant harassment from local authorities.

== Global presence and centers ==
=== India ===
India has the highest density of ISKCON centers in the world, with over 800 temples, 12 state-recognized educational institutions, 25 affiliated and non-affiliated restaurants, and a number of tourist and pilgrimage hotels. ISKCON India disciples are more conservative than the ISKCON disciples in the west.

==== Vrindaban ====
Vrindaban is a pan-Indian pilgrimage town historically developed by Bengali Vaishnavas and devotees consider it to be the place where Krishna performed his deeds on Earth. In 1976, the Krishna Balaram Mandir was founded, which by the late 1980s was an "integral part of Vrindaban's sacred complex". ISKCON devotees in the town claim to be Brahmins, a view paradoxical to the traditional Indian belief that it is impossible for foreigners to even be Hindu. By the 1980s however, ISKCON members had successfully manipulated the devotion-centered social fabric of the town and were to be considered "Brahmin-like" due to successful displays of Krishna-devotion and behavior.

==== Temple of Vedic Planetarium, Mayapur ====
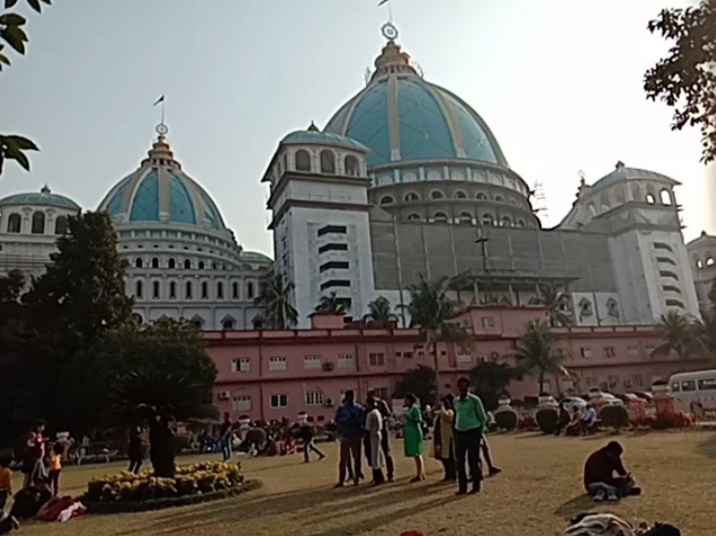
The ISKCON Temple of the Vedic Planetarium at Mayapur, under construction

Set to be completed by 2027, the Temple of the Vedic Planetarium, Mayapur in West Bengal is built in the birthplace of Sri Chaitanya Mahaprabhu, the founder of the Gaudiya-Vaishnava lineage of Hinduism. The temple itself currently sits at 425,000 square feet (39,500 m^{2}) and is 340 feet (100 m) tall, and is surrounded by accompanying lodges, shops, residences, educational centers, and gardens. The project cost an estimated $75 million, with its major investor being Alfred B. Ford, the great-grandson of Henry Ford. The complex has a planetarium based on Vedic cosmology and exhibitions about the Vedic arts, sciences, and culture as described in the Srimad Bhagavatam.

==== Sri Krishna-Balaram Mandir, Vrindavan ====
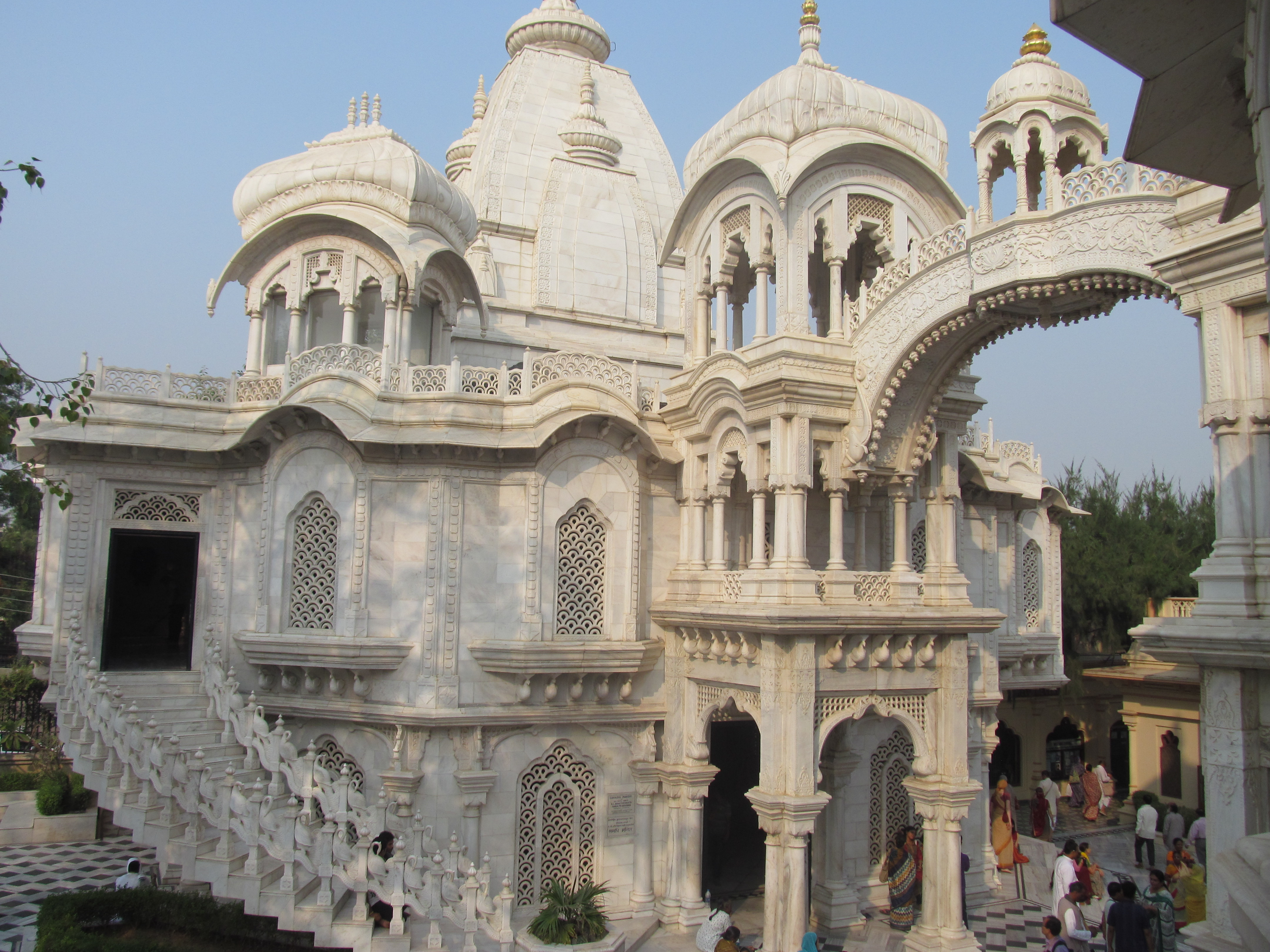
Sri Krishna-Balaram Mandir, Vrindavan

Located in the Raman Reti area of Vrindavan, Uttar Pradesh, the Sri Krishna Balaram Mandir temple was built in the original village where the spiritual figures Krishna and Balarama are said to have resided in the Vedic period of Indian history. It is built in close proximity to other holy sites such as the village of Gokul, Govardhana Hill, the Mathura palace, and various holy lakes. As a result, ISKCON Vrindavan is a common pilgrimage site for followers of the Krishna Conscious movement. The complex is home to a guesthouse, a museum, gift shops, a restaurant, a bakery, a broadcast studio as well as a marble temple hall. The temple is also affiliated with the Vrindavan Institute of Higher Education.

==== Vrindavan Chandrodaya Mandir, Vrindavan ====
In March 2014, the Vrindavan Chandrodaya Mandir temple project was inaugurated, and on 16 November 2014, the foundation stone of the temple was laid. Overseen by ISKCON Bangalore, the Vrindavan Chandrodaya Mandir temple building is currently under construction.

==== ISKCON Temple, Bengaluru ====
In May 1997, Bangalore ISKCON Temple was inaugurated by the ninth president of India, Shankar Dayal Sharma.

There is a gold-plated dhwaja-stambha (flag post) 17 m (56 ft) high and a gold plated kalash shikhara 8.5 m (28 ft) high. There is free distribution of Sri Krishna prasadam to all visitors during the darshana hours.

ISKCON Bangalore has six shrines:

1. Main deities is of Radha-Krishna
2. Krishna Balrama
3. Nitai Gauranga (Chaitanya Mahaprabhu and Nityananda)
4. Srinivasa Govinda (also known as Venkateswara)
5. Prahlada Narasimha
6. Srila Prabhupada

==== Radha Krishna Mandir, Chennai ====
The Chennai temple is located on the East Coast Road in southern part of the city. Built on 1.5 acres (0.61 ha) of land and consecrated in 2012, the temple is the largest Radha Krishna temple in Tamil Nadu.

=== Europe ===
There are over 135 ISKCON-affiliated temples and cultural centers in Europe. The ISKCON movement in Europe is home to a number of rural and farming communities, including Nueva Vrajamandala in Spain, La Nouvelle Mayapura in France, Villa Vrindavan in Italy and Simhachalam in Germany.

There are also 31 additional centers in Russia, as Vaishnava Hinduism represents one of the largest denominations of faith in the country.

While most initiated disciples in Britain in the 1980s were young white British, the movement had support from the expatriate Indian Hindu community. British Indian Hindus generally attended ISKCON temples as one of many available Hindu temples.

Through the first three decades of its existence, ISKCON's methods of communication in Britain have adapted to fit various circumstances. In the 1960s the movement via traditional ISKCON methods (book distribution, public sankirtana, and Sunday Feasts) but also through their musical connections with George Harrison and John Lennon. From 1970 to 1985 the movement acquired Bhaktivedanta Manor and Chaitanya College in addition to the original Bury Place, London temple. While winning the attention of a small group of youth, during these period a negative image of ISKCON developed in the media and the anti-cult movement. From 1985 to 1998, ISKCON actively cultivated a relationship with the resident Indian Hindu community and leveraged its connections to Hinduism to win greater respectability and recognition from the general public.

==== Bhaktivedanta Manor, Watford, UK ====
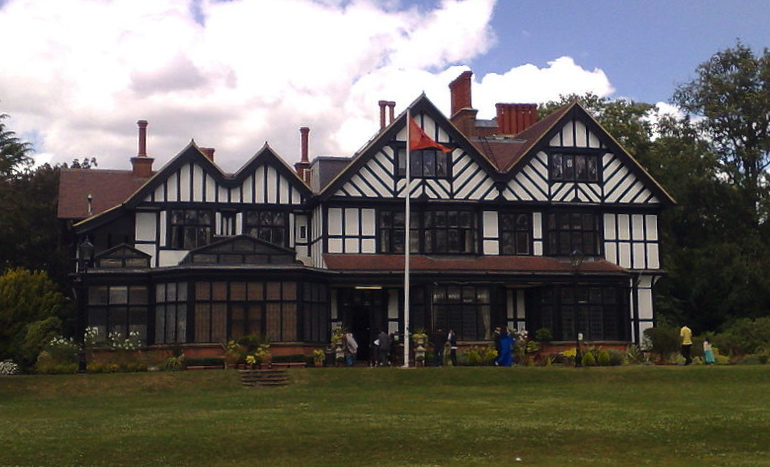
Bhaktivedanta Manor

A landscaped property featuring gardens, lakes, a school, farm, numerous temple and housing buildings, accommodations, and a bakery. The property for Bhaktivedanta Manor was donated by George Harrison of the Beatles and is on the National Heritage List for England. The houses on the property, including the temple, are built in the mock-Tudor mansion style of the 1800s.

Bhaktivedanta Manor is also home to the London College of Vedic Studies, and is the birthplace of the Avanti Schools Trust, a sponsor of state-funded primary and secondary schools that provides both non-denominational and Hindu-faith education throughout the UK.

Demographically, the majority of devotees in Europe are ethnic Europeans. An exception can be made with the demographics of devotees in the United Kingdom, which caters to the Indian immigrant population, mirroring the demographics of most North American centers.

=== South America ===
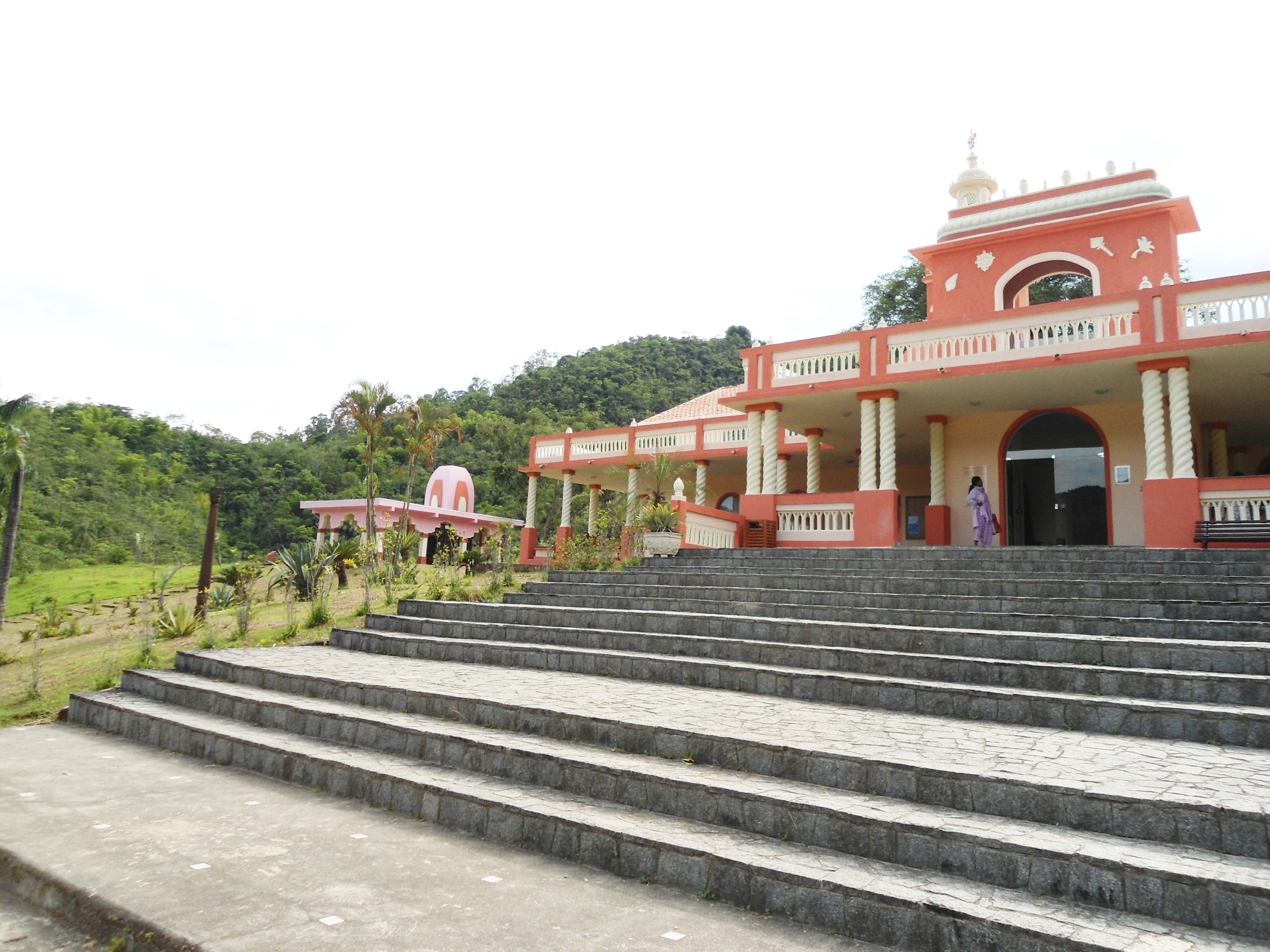
The temple of ISKCON eco-village "Nova Gokula", Pindamonhangaba, São Paulo, Brazil

There are 60 affiliated ISKCON temples in South America, with most congregations located in Argentina and Brazil. There are also a number of devotee-run farming communities throughout Latin America. Most notable is the eco-village "Nova Gokula" at Pindamonhangaba in the Brazil state of São Paulo, founded in 1978, with two temples planning as traditional Hindu architecture.

=== United States ===
There are 56 formally affiliated ISKCON centers in the United States. Notable centers include Sri Sri Radha Krishna Temple (Spanish Fork), Utah, New Raman Reti in Alachua, FL, and The Radha Kalachandji Temple in Dallas, TX. Hare Krishna-affiliated full-time communities include New Vrindaban in West Virginia, and Gita Nagari Eco Farm and Sanctuary in Pennsylvania. There are various other centers in the United States that promote Krishna Conscious culture without being formally affiliated with ISKCON, including The Bhakti Center in New York City.

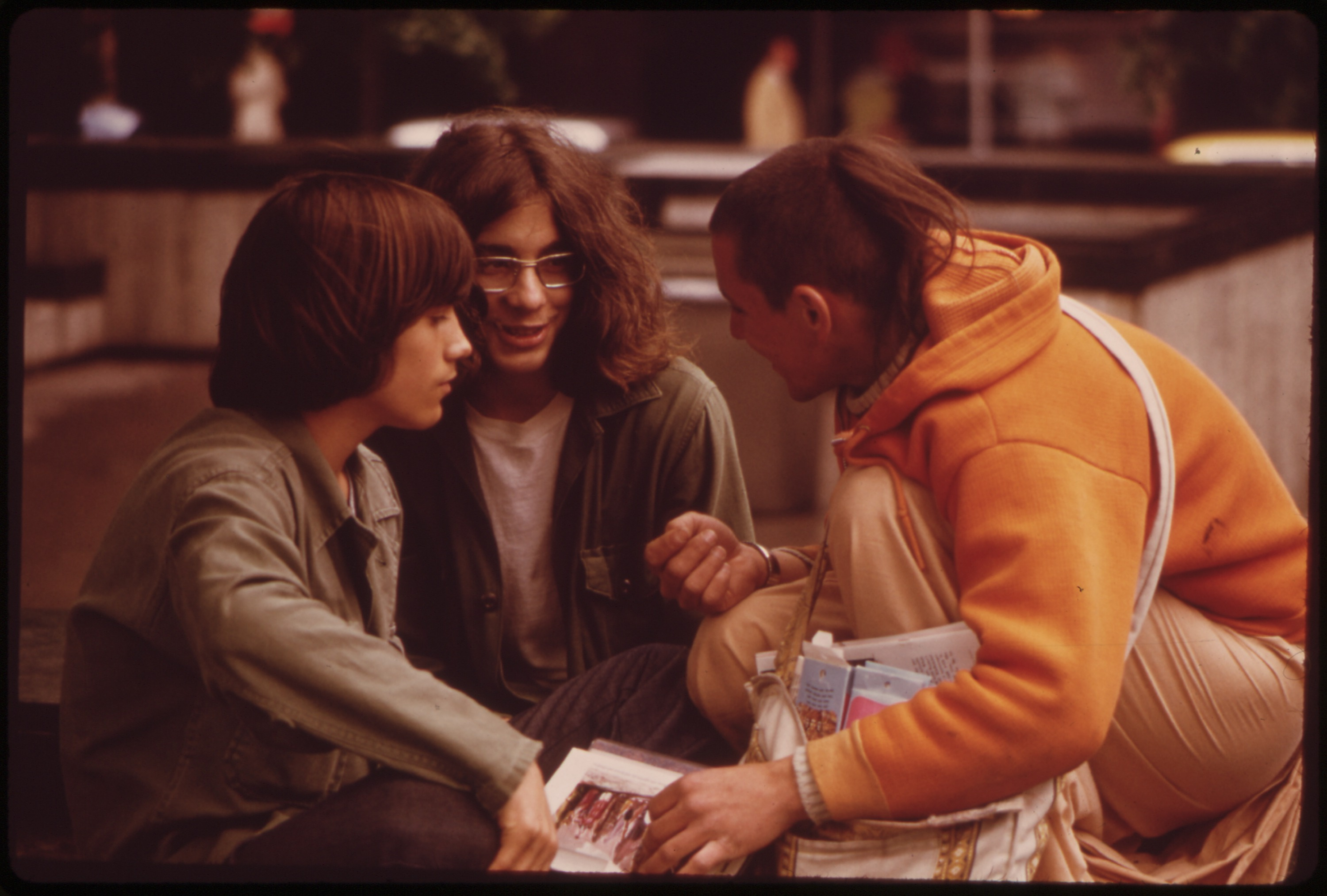
Hare Krishna devotee proselytizing in downtown Cincinnati, May 1973.

According to Rochford (1985), the large majority of converts to the Hare Krishna movement in the United States were young white people. Because of their youth, most had not completed an undergraduate college degree. Converts mainly came from middle and upper-middle class Christian and Jewish families where their familial religion was stressed mainly during early childhood and then declined as the years went on. Early converts (pre-1971) had previously participated in the counterculture of the 1960s and the Anti-war movement, while later converts (1977–1980) did not due to ISKCON's convert demography continuing to retain the same young age-bracket. Most had already been spiritual seekers, and the vast majority had previously experimented with some forms of drugs (alcohol, marijuana, hallucinogens, etc.). Most devotees stated that the three main reasons for their conversion was the Hare Krishna philosophy, the geniality of devotees, and personal attraction to Prabhupada. Most devotees had not worked serious careers prior to conversion and had no skilled occupational skills; forces that allowed for structural availability for ISKCON recruitment, while on the other hand there often were countervailing social ties opposed to their participation in the movement. Men and women were recruited through different structures: men were recruited more often via interaction with Hare Krishna devotees in public spaces, while women were recruited more often through social networks with ISKCON members. According to Rochford, by the 1980s the marginal status of women in American society was being challenged by the feminist movement, which advocated pushing women into the public (masculine) world. ISKCON in contrast offered a traditionalist solution to the issue of women's marginality, by ideologically supporting the domesticity of traditionalist women who desired to remain in the private sphere. ISKCON also offered a solution to the issue of men's marginality (the loneliness felt by some men in the competitive, egocentric male sphere) by providing a male lifestyle with intimate interpersonal relationships. Men, being less closed-off and wary to strangers, were more successfully recruited in public spaces; in particular, female Hare Krishna devotees were able to leverage their gender to more successfully approach men in public than their male devotee counterparts.

==== New Vrindaban ====
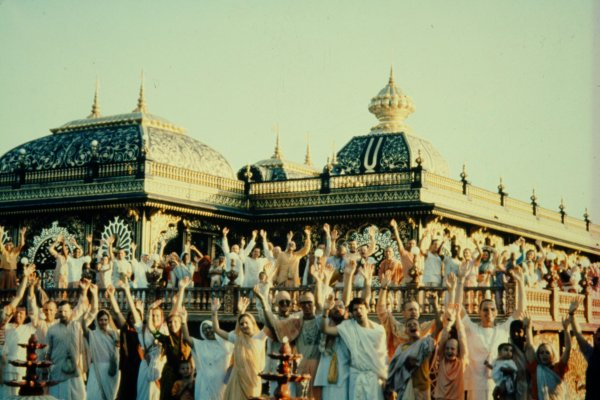
Prabhupada's Palace of Gold and Hare Krishna devotees, c. 1982.

The New Vrindaban community was founded in 1968 in rural West Virginia by Kirtanananda Swami as a self-sufficient, proto-technological community, attempting to recreate a Vedic village. The local Protestant-majority community viewed New Vrindaban negatively, leading New Vrindaban to attempt to legitimize itself theologically via interreligious dialogue with the local Ministerial Association in the 1980s; however, the locals were more concerned with New Vrindaban's lifestyle choices and criminal allegations than theological issues. To legitimate themselves scholarly, the community published books and journals on ISKCON subjects and invited professors to share insights. By the late 1980s, New Vrindaban had gained "grudging acceptance" from the locals by focusing on improving secular values, i.e. "pragmatism, industry, relative cleanliness, openness, and perseverance". The community also serviced the Indian American community by providing a temple amenable to Hindu tradition, cultural education of second-generation immigrants, and cow-protection. Additionally, the local community viewed Indian-Americans as a more acceptable demographic for the sect and as financial contributors to ISKCON, allaying fears about religious conversion of locals. Despite these changes by the late 1980s, the community continued to uphold its traditions via the principles of pilgrimage, darsana, and prasada.

== Subsidiary organisations ==
=== Bhaktivedanta Book Trust ===
Bhaktivedanta Book Trust (BBT) is a nonprofit organization, of ISKCON, and supplies books both to ISKCON and to the book trade in general. BBT is the publisher of books on the Gaudiya Vaishnava. BBT was established in 1972 by A. C. Bhaktivedanta as the publisher for his books and for books by other authors. It also publishes the magazine Back to Godhead in multiple languages.

=== The Friends of Lord Krishna ===
The Friends of Lord Krishna (FOLK) was established in 1979 to spread ISKCON teachings to non-Hindu British people in a less intense manner than the movement's original methods. Via the publication of a FOLK magazine, leveraging friend networks of devotees, V.I.P. programmes to attract celebrities, and university programmes to target young people, the group seeks to spread ISKCON principles amongst a non-monastic audience who would be expected to retain their ordinary lives and careers.

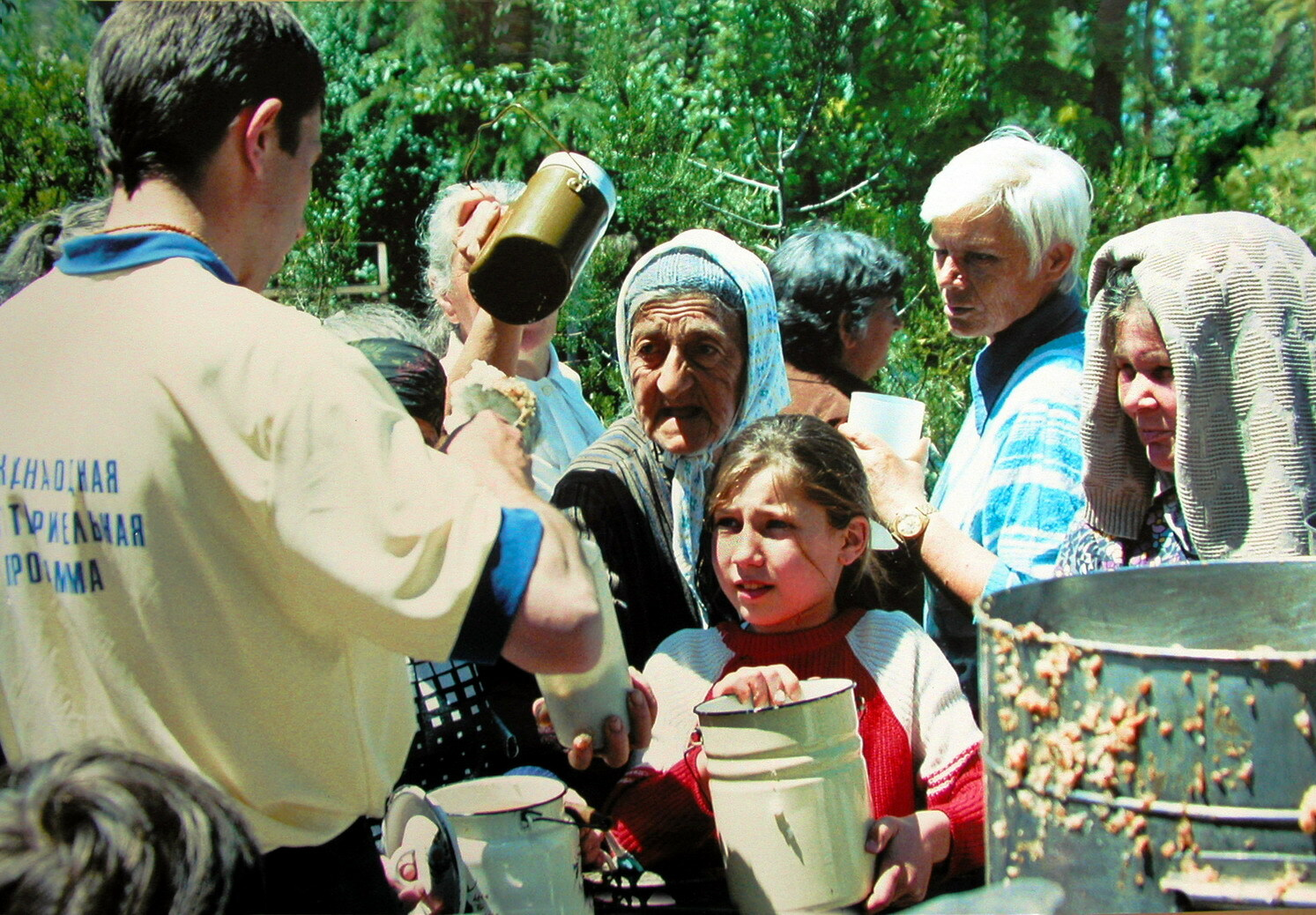
Member of Food for Life Russia giving food

=== Pandava Sena ===
Based out of Bhaktivedanta Manor of Watford UK, Pandava Sena is a youth organization started in 1994. It is composed of professionals and university students that host annual international mentorship and reunion retreats and weekly social gatherings.

Pandava Sena has also established "KCSocs" or "Krishna Conscious Societies" across 30 universities in the UK. Many universities have similar student groups featuring youth from local ISKCON temples.

=== Food relief ===
ISKCON has operated food relief programmes in India. The ISKCON Food Relief Foundation was engaged by Municipal Corporation of Greater Mumbai to provide mid-day meals to students in government schools in 2008 and 2009.

== See also ==
- Hare Krsna TV
- Hare Krishna in popular culture
- Krishna valley, Hungary
- New religious movement
- Vedanta Society

== Sources ==
- Beck, Guy L., ed. (2005). Alternative Krishnas: Regional and Vernacular Variations on a Hindu Deity. SUNY Press. ISBN 0-7914-6415-6.
- Bryant, Edwin F.; Ekstrand, Maria, eds. (2004). The Hare Krishna Movement: The Postcharismatic Fate of a Religious Transplant. New York: Columbia University Press. ISBN 0-231-12256-X.
- Dwyer, Graham; Cole, Richard (Radha Mohan Das) (2007). The Hare Krishna Movement: Forty Years of Chant and Change. London: I. B. Tauris. ISBN 978-1-84511-407-7.
- Gibson, Lynne (2002). Modern World Religions: Hinduism – Pupil Book Core (Modern World Religions). Oxford (England): Heinemann Educational Publishers. ISBN 0-435-33619-3.
- Greene, Joshua M. (2006). Here Comes the Sun: The Spiritual and Musical Journey of George Harrison. Hoboken, New Jersey: John Wiley & Sons. ISBN 978-0-470-12780-3.
- Knott, Kim (1986). My Sweet Lord: The Hare Krishna Movement. Wellingborough: The Aquarian Press.
- Lagace, Marc Lodge Andrew (2026). Hare Krishna in China. New York: Routledge. ISBN 9781041287506.
- Lavezzoli, Peter (2006). The Dawn of Indian Music in the West. New York: Continuum. ISBN 0-8264-2819-3.
- Rochford, E. Burke (2007). Hare Krishna Transformed. The New and Alternative Religions Series. New York: NYU Press. ISBN 978-0814775790.
- Rosen, Steven J., ed. (1992). Vaiṣṇavism: Contemporary Scholars Discuss the Gauḍīya Tradition. New York: FOLK Books.
- Brooks, Charles R. (Spring 1998). Rosen, Steven J. (ed.). "ISKCON's Place in the Bengal Vaishnava Tradition of Caitanya Mahāprabhu". Journal of Vaiṣṇava Studies. 6: ISKCON/A.C. Bhaktivedanta Swami (2). Brooklyn, New York: FOLK Books. ISSN 1062-1237.
- Spizer, Bruce (2005). The Beatles Solo on Apple Records. New Orleans, LA: 498 Productions. ISBN 0-9662649-5-9.
- Squarcini, Federico; Fizzotti, Eugenio (2004). Introvigne, Massimo (ed.). Hare Krishna. Studies in Contemporary Religion. Signature Books.
