= Hinduism in Poland =

Polish Hindus
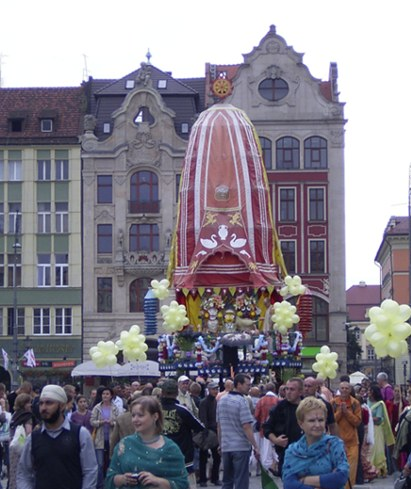
- Ratha-Yatra in Wrocław, Poland

Religions
- Hinduism; Majority: Vaishnavism; Minority: Shaivism

Scriptures
- Vedas

Languages
- Sanskrit (sacred); Polish language

Hinduism in Poland is a minority religion. Hinduism has spread to Poland through ISKCON since 1976. First groups of Polish devotees were established in Warsaw and Wrocław. The first Polish Hindu temple was established in 1980 in Czarnów, Lower Silesian Voivodeship (New Shantipur Temple in Czarnów). Main ISKCON temple is New Ramana Reti Temple in Mysiadło (est. in 1989).

The Communist regime in Poland promoted an antireligious campaign. After the breakdown of this regime in 1989, missionaries from other Hindu religious denominations have arrived and met with limited success.

== Hindu organisations in Poland ==
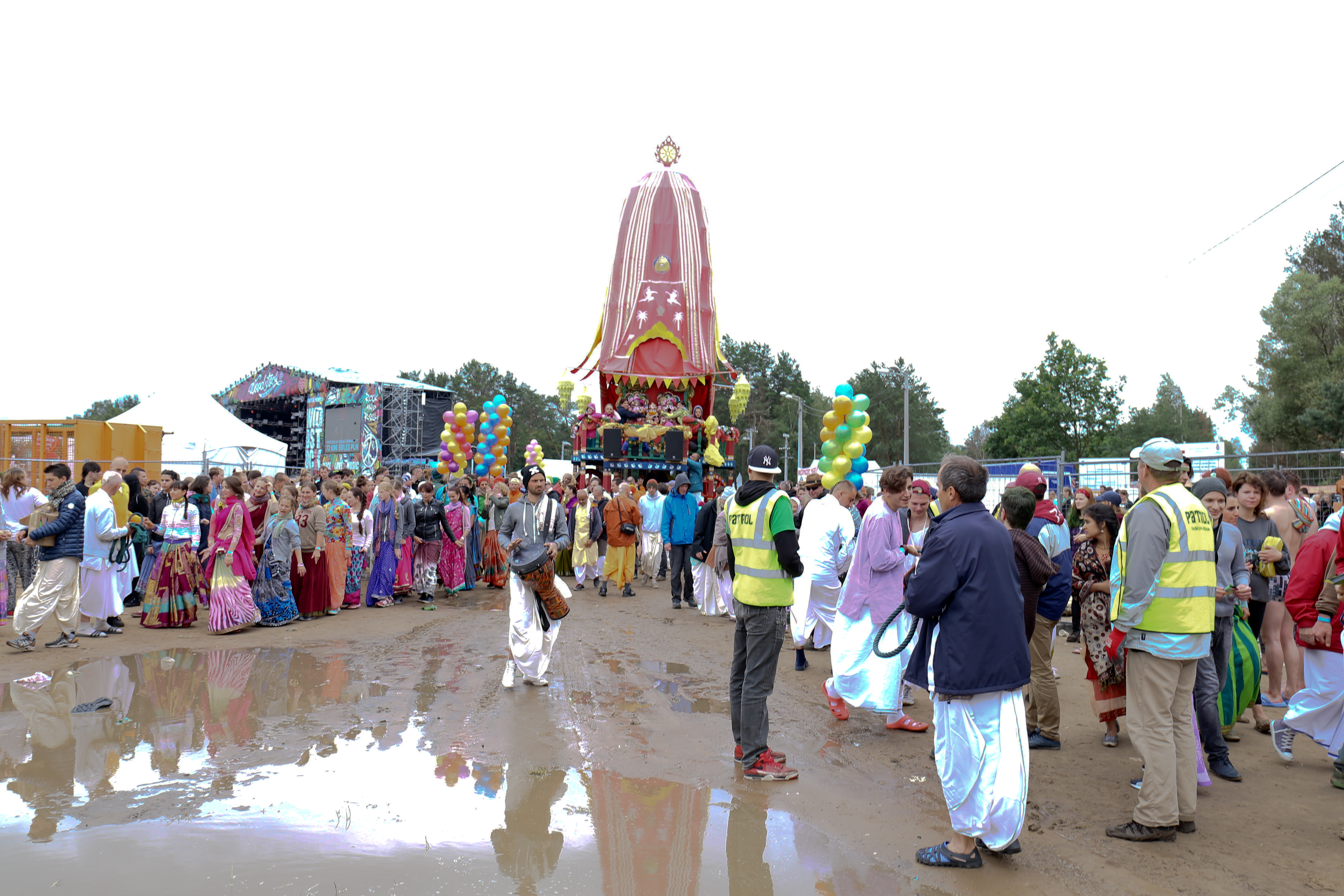
Hindu festival in Poland.

There are around thirteen Hindu religious movements in Poland. Some of the important organisations are ISKCON, Chaitanya Mission, Satya Sai Baba movement (though it is partially Hindu), Brahma kumaris, Sivananda Yoga, Radha Govind Society of Poland, and Sahaja Yoga, Swadhyay Parivar.

The Bhakti Marga Foundation led by Swami Vishwananda established its first Polish temple in Warsaw in 2009.

== ISKCON in Poland ==
There are 928 (official sources) ISKCON followers in Poland. There are 3 main temples in Czarnów, Warsaw, and Wrocław. Additionally ISKCON has its centres in most large cities.

=== ISKCON centres/temples in Poland ===
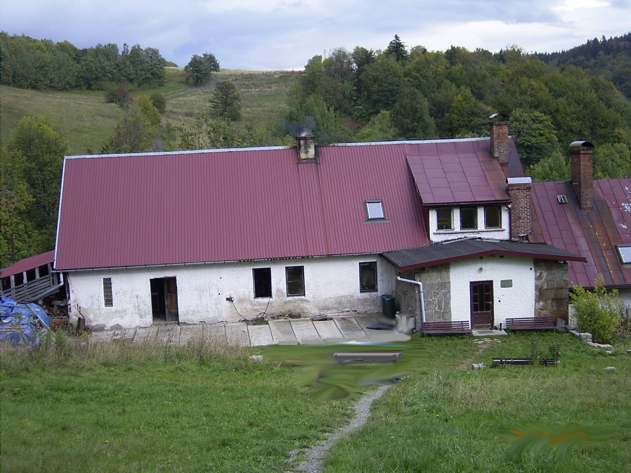
Nowe Śantipur Temple in Czarnów

New Shantipur Mandir in Czarnów

- New Shantipur (Nowe Śantipur) ISKCON temple (since 1980, the oldest Hindu temple in Poland) in Czarnów
- New Ramana Reti Temple in Mysiadło near Warsaw, Deities: Gaura-Nitai
- New Navadvip Temple in Wrocław, Deities: Gaura-Nitai
- New Shantipur Temple in Czarnów Deities : Pancha Tattva

== Indians in Poland ==
The Indian community in Poland is relatively small and is estimated at around 23,800 persons. The large majority are NRIs and there not more than 100 PIOs.

== Demographics ==
According to the 2011 Census, there were 866 Hindus in Poland. Among them 341 belonged to the Hindu Bhavan Religious Association, 285 to ISKCON, and the remaining to the Chaitanya mission, Radha Govind Society of Poland.

According to census data in 2017 provided by Główny Urząd Statystyczny, Poland's Central Statistical Office, ISKCON had 2,388 followers, 333 clergy and 24 centres.

== Yoga in Poland ==
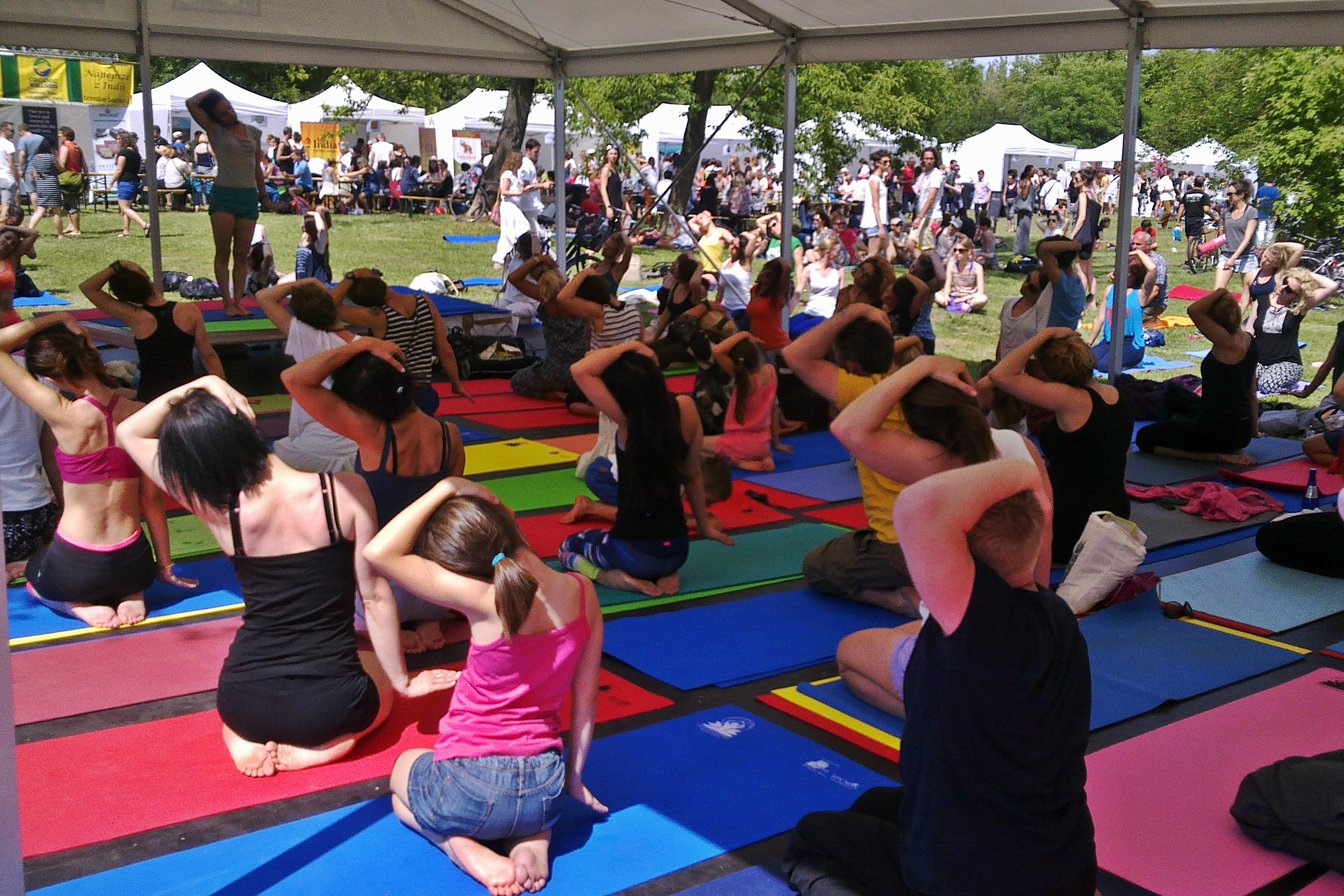
2nd International Yoga Day, Warsaw, 2016

Yoga is gaining popularity in Poland.

International Sivananda Yoga Vedanta Centres in Poland

- Sivananda Yoga Vedanta Centrum - Kraków, Poland

Yoga in daily Life Centre in Poland

- Centrum Jogi Joga w Zyciu Codziennym, Warsaw.

Recently, Yoga Master Anil Machado from Sieradz had received special honor from the Prime Minister of India Shri. Narendra Modi, for spreading the teachings of Yoga and also presenting Yoga in over 500 schools throughout Poland.

== See also ==
- List of Hindu temples in Poland
- Hinduism in Europe
