= Panihati Chida Dahi Utsav =

Panihati Chida Dahi Utsav পানিহাটি চিঁড়ে দই উৎসব
- Date: Jyeshtha Sukla Trayodashi
- Begins: Sukla Trayodashi (13th day of the bright fortnight of Jyeshtha)
- Ends: Same day
- Frequency: Annual
- Venue: Mahotsav Tala Ghat
- Locations: Panihati, West Bengal, India
- Country: India
- Years active: Since 1517 CE
- Founder: Nityananda Prabhu
- Participants: Hundreds of thousands of devotees and pilgrims

The Panihati Chida Dahi Utsav (Bengali: পানিহাটি চিঁড়ে দই উৎসব), also known as the Chipped Rice and Yogurt Festival or DandaMahotsav (Festival of Punishment), is an annual religious festival celebrated by the Gaudiya Vaishnava community. It takes place at Mahotsav Tala Ghat on the banks of the Hooghly River in Panihati, West Bengal, India.

The festival commemorates a 500 year old historical event wherein Nityananda Prabhu lovingly penalised Raghunatha Dasa Goswami, who later became one of the Six Goswamis of Vrindavan by ordering him to fund and organise a massive feast of chipped rice (chida) and yogurt (dahi) for all gathered devotees.

The festival is traditionally observed on the Sukla Trayodashi (the 13th day of the bright fortnight) in the Hindu lunar month of Jyeshtha (corresponding to May or June). According to Vaishnava theology, Chaitanya Mahaprabhu mystically appeared at the inaugural event to partake in the feast alongside Nityananda Prabhu. In contemporary times, the festival attracts hundreds of thousands of pilgrims to Panihati and is replicated globally across ISKCON and Gaudiya Math temples, where devotees break earthen pots filled with sweetened, spiced rice mixtures amidst congregational chanting (kirtan).

== History and origins ==
The Panihati Chida Dahi Utsav dates back to June 1517 CE (the Hindu month of Jyeshtha) during the peak of the Bhakti movement in Bengal. The historical narrative of the festival is formally detailed in Chapter 6 of the Antya-lila section of the Caitanya-caritāmṛta, the definitive hagiography of Chaitanya Mahaprabhu written by Krsnadasa Kaviraja Goswami.

=== Meeting of Nityananda Prabhu and Raghunatha Das ===
Raghunatha Das, the son of Govardhana Majumdar a highly opulent, aristocratic zamindar (landlord) of Saptagram had long desired to renounce his immense material wealth to permanently join Chaitanya Mahaprabhu’s spiritual mission in Jagannath Puri. However, his family repeatedly intercepted his attempts to escape and kept him under strict domestic guard.

Upon learning that Chaitanya Mahaprabhu's chief associate, Nityananda Prabhu, had arrived in the trading village of Panihati, Raghunatha Das obtained permission from his father to visit him. He arrived at the banks of the Ganges River, where Nityananda Prabhu was seated beneath a historic banyan tree (Bat Tala), surrounded by a large gathering of disciples and local kirtan singers.

=== The Loving Punishment ===
Out of deep humility and hesitation, Raghunatha Das chose not to approach directly and instead prostrated himself to offer obeisances from a distance. When Nityananda Prabhu's attendants pointed him out, Nityananda Prabhu playfully accused him of being a thief who tried to hide rather than approach the assembly openly.

Nityananda Prabhu ordered his followers to forcibly bring Raghunatha Das forward. Placing his feet onto Raghunatha Das's head, he decreed a penalty (danda), because of his theft and wealth, Raghunatha Das was mandated to fund, prepare, and serve an immediate feast of chipped rice (chida) and yogurt (dahi) to feed Nityananda Prabhu's entire entourage and all village residents.

=== The Grand Feast of 1517 ===
Raghunatha Das enthusiastically accepted the decree. He dispatched his men to neighboring villages to purchase massive quantities of chipped rice, yogurt, milk, condensed milk (rabri), sugar, camphor, and bananas.

The preparations were mixed in large earthen pots. Two distinct varieties. Dahi Chida, Chipped rice soaked in fresh yogurt, sweetened with sugar and bananas.

Dugdha Chida, Chipped rice soaked in condensed, boiled milk, enriched with ghee, sugar, and camphor.

As word of the impromptu feast spread, thousands of pilgrims, Brahmins, and travelers crowded the Mahotsav Tala Ghat. The crowd grew so dense that the riverbank could not accommodate them, hundreds sat on the steps leading to the water, while many stood waist deep in the Ganges holding their clay bowls.

According to Gaudiya Vaishnava tradition, the intensity of the devotees' devotion caused Chaitanya Mahaprabhu to mystically manifest at the scene from Jagannath Puri. He and Nityananda Prabhu walked through the crowds, playfully stealing morsels of food from each other's pots and feeding the assembled devotees.

Following the successful execution of the festival and the subsequent satisfaction of the Vaishnava community, Nityananda Prabhu blessed Raghunatha Das, predicting that his obstacles would dissolve and he would soon successfully attain Chaitanya Mahaprabhu's personal association a prophecy fulfilled shortly thereafter.

== Observance ==
The festival has been reported to be celebrated at more than 100 locations, including in the Indian states of West Bengal, Telangana, Karnataka, Uttar Pradesh, and the National Capital Territory of Delhi, as well as in countries such as South Africa, Canada, the United States, and the United Kingdom.

In 2026, to commemorate the 510th anniversary of the Panihati Chida Dahi Utsav, the Bhaktivedanta Research Center launched the Kolkata Chida Dahi Mahotsav in South Kolkata. The event was inaugurated by West Bangal Cabinet Finance Minister Swapan Dasgupta.
