= Ekachakra =

- village
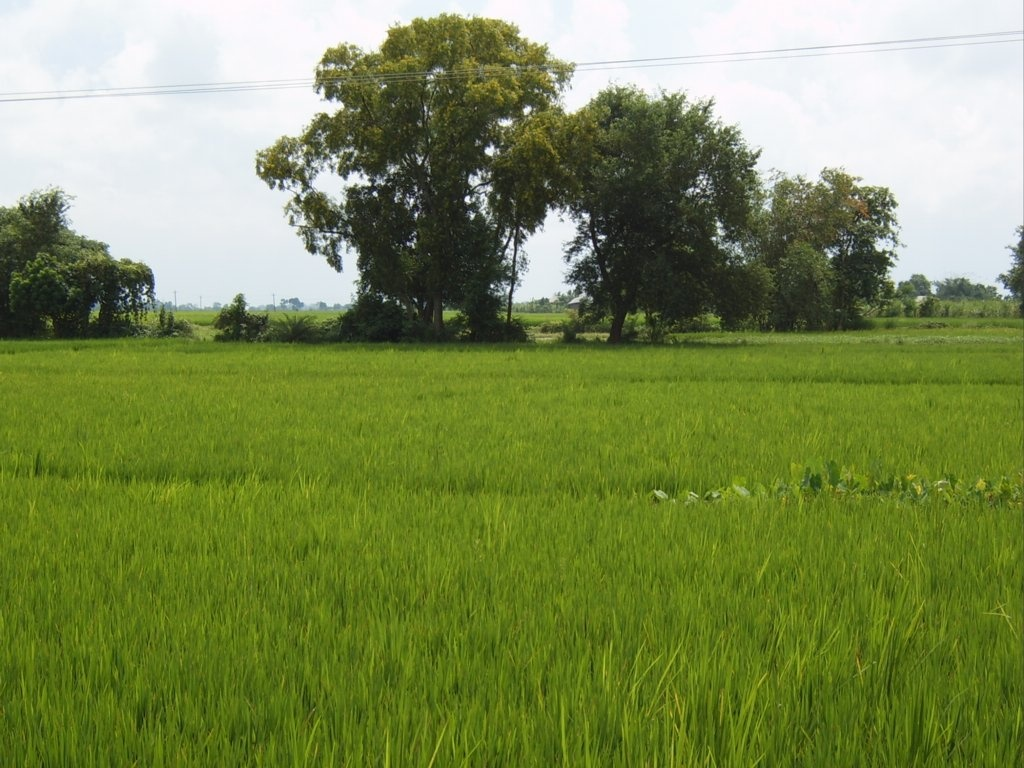
- Ekachakra dharm, the location where the Pandavas are said to have stayed.

- Location in West Bengal, India Ekachakra (India)
- Coordinates: 24.061434°N 87.847789°E
- Country: India
- State: West Bengal
- District: Birbhum

Languages
  - Official: Bengali, English
- Time zone: UTC+5:30 (IST)
- Website: birbhum.nic.in

Ekachakra is a small village, located 20 km away from the town of Rampurhat in the Birbhum District of West Bengal. Within Hindu tradition, the five Pandavas from the epic, Mahabharata are described as staying in Ekachakra during their years in exile. It is also famous as the birthplace of Nityananda Rama (b 1474 CE), a principal religious figure in the Gaudiya Vaishnava tradition.

The village extends north and south for an area of about eight miles. Other villages, namely Viracandra-pura and Virabhadra-pura, are situated within the area of the village of Ekacakra. In honor of Virachandra Goswami (the son of Nityananda), these places are renowned as Viracandra-pura and Virabhadra-pura.Ekachakra Dhum Birchandrapur Also Femous History cal Place of the Murali Dangal krishna kali tala

== Toponym ==
The origin of the name Ekachakra is associated with the legend of the Pandavas. In the battle of Kurukshetra Krishna broke his vow of not actively participating in the war as a warrior and rushed with chariot wheel chakram to help his devotee Arjuna, and slay Bhishma who had been fighting with Arjuna but not losing. When Bhishma satisfied him with many beautiful prayers, Krishna lost his anger and tossed aside the chariot wheel chakram. The chakram fell on this tract of land and therefore got the name Ekachakra. Eka means one, and chakra means chakram.

In the Mahabharata, it is also believed to be the place where Demon Bakasura lived who was later slain by Bhima. However, there are several places all over India which contest as ancient Ekachakra.

== Geography ==
Cities and towns in Rampurhat subdivision of Birbhum district
M: municipal city/ town, CT: census town, R: rural/ urban centre.
Owing to space constraints in the small map, the actual locations in a larger map may vary slightly

=== Location ===
Ekachakra is located at 24.061434°N 87.847789°E.

== Garbhavasa ==
This is said to be the actual birthplace of Nityananda. In the Janmasthan Mandir there is a deity of Nitai (Nityananda) worshipped by a local brahmin family. Hadai Pandita Bhavan is the site of the original house of Nityananda's father. The small white temple next to Nitai Kund marks the exact spot where Nityananda was born. There are two banyan trees by this temple that are said to have existed since the time of Nityananda.

In the center of the main altar of the temple is a deity of Lord Nityananda. To his left, with his hands raised, is Chaitanya Mahaprabhu. On Nityananda's right is Advaita Acharya. The side altar has deities of Radha-Radhakanta and Radha-Srikanta, a large dancing Gouranga in the center, and ten brass sakhis at the bottom. The temple was constructed by Prasannakumara Karapharma.

== Mala Tala ==
There is an old Pippala tree here called 'Mala Tala'. Just before Nityananda departed the village in his youth, Hadai Pandita came here and chanted japa under this tree. Mala means "japa beads" and tala means "tree." When Nitai was about to depart Hadai Pandita left his japa beads here due to anxiety.

Chaitanya Mahaprabhu came to Ekacakra many years after Nityananda left. It is said that at that time Chaitanya left his flower garland on a branch of this tree. Mala also means "garland." Therefore, also for this reason this tree was called Mala Tala.

== Hantugada Tirtha ==
(Also known as Jahnu Kund) It is said that Nitai brought all the sacred waters from all the holy places to this kunda to save the local residents from having to journey to the Ganges to take a sacred bath. It is named Hantugada because Nityananda Prabhu used to perform the Cida-dahi festival of distributing chipped rice with yogurt prasadam here and He would take the prasada while kneeling down.

== Pandava Tala ==
This place is a five-minute walk (400m) into the fields, southeast of Nityananda's birthplace. It is surrounded by a group of Keli-kadamba trees. The Pandavas are said to have lived here with their mother, Kunti, when they were exiled to the forest.

== Bankima Raya Mandira ==
The current deity within the Bankima Raya temple was found by Nityananda himself, within the Yamuna river of Ekachakra. The deity was then installed in a temple that is now submerged within Jahnu kunda. Nityananda is believed to have merged within this deity at the time of his disappearance. The present temple of Bankima Raya is also an old one. The deity of Jahnava Mata (Nityananda's wife) was placed beside him. In this temple there is also a small samadhi of Virachandra Goswami.

== How to Reach ==
Ekchakra Dham is located in Birchandrapur, in the Birbhum district of West Bengal, India. The site can be easily reached using various modes of transportation:

- Railways:

The closest railway station is Rampurhat Junction, situated roughly 20 km from Ekchakra Dham. Rampurhat has good rail connectivity with major cities in West Bengal and other parts of India. Local transport such as taxis or buses is available from the station to the site.

- Roadways:

The Dham is well connected via roadways. It is approximately:

20 km from Rampurhat

116 km from Durgapur

212 km from Kolkata

Visitors from South Bengal can travel to Tarapith or Rampurhat using SBSTC state buses or private buses and then take local transport to reach Ekchakra Dham. Similarly, those coming from North Bengal can use NBSTC or private buses to Rampurhat and continue their journey via local transport to the destination.

== See also ==
- Vrindavan
- Mayapur
- Nityananda
- Sankirtan
