= Indians in Poland =

Migrants from India to Poland

Total population
- Approx 10,000-38,000

Regions with significant populations
- Warsaw · Kraków · Łódź · Pabianice

Languages
- Polish · English · Other Indian languages

Religion
- Hinduism · Sikhism

Related ethnic groups
- People of Indian Origin

Indians in Poland consist of migrants from India to Poland and their locally born descendants. The estimations of the number of Indians in Poland is 38,000 by governmental sources.

== Migration history ==
Indians started migrating to Poland in the late 1980s and early 1990s when the political situation in Poland changed, and new opportunities started to emerge. Most of them are businessmen who migrated to Poland to take advantage of the economic boom after Warsaw opted for a free-market economy in 1989 and joined the European Union in 2004. In 2007, Poland signed an agreement with India to admit more Indian migrant workers as part of an effort to ameliorate labour shortages caused by the outward migration of hundreds of thousands of Polish workers to wealthier countries in the European Union. Newer groups of Indians in Poland are students and academics. Recent research shows that the Indian community has been well integrated into Polish society.

Number of work permits for Indian citizens and number of Indian students enrolled in Polish universities

Year	Total number of work permits for foreigners issued	Of which for Indians (%)	Number of work permits for Indian citizens*	Academic year	Number of Indian students enrolled in Polish universities
2010	36 800	3,2	1 189	2009-10	227
2011	40 808	2,6	1 055	2010-11	148
2012	39 144	2,78%	1 088	2011-12	189
2013	39 078	3,33%	1 301	2012-13	204
2014	43 663	2,84%	1 240	2013-14	321
2015	65 786	2,17%	1 428	2014-15	545
2016	127 394	1,39%	1 771	2015-16	896
2017	235 626	1,61%	3 794	2016-17	2 138
2018	328 768	2,54%	8 362	2017-18	2 987
2019	*	*%	*	2018-19	3600 (preliminary data)

- (Calculated on basis of col. 1 and col. 2)

== Religion ==
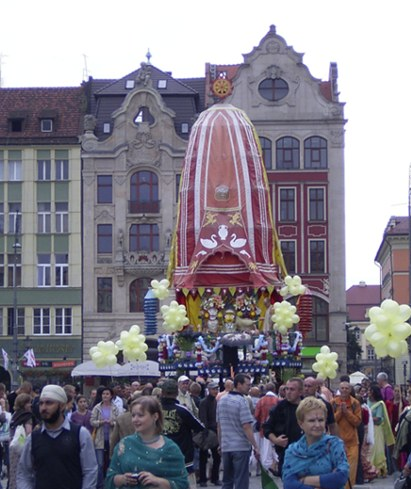
Ratha Yatra festival organised by the New Navadvip Temple in Wrocław in 2010

The Indian community in Poland is primarily composed of Hindus and Sikhs. Hinduism began to spread in the country through the International Society for Krishna Consciousness (ISKCON) missionaries starting in 1976. The first Hindu temple in Poland, the New Shantipur Temple, was established in 1980 in Czarnów, Lower Silesian Voivodeship. A second Hindu temple, known as Hindu Bhavan, was constructed in Warsaw. The Indian community hopes that the temple sensitizes the community's youth towards Indian tradition and customs, as well as to use the new place of worship as a tool to integrate with Polish society.

There are about 120 Sikh families in Warsaw headed by J J Singh, the most prominent Indian, who is also the president of Indo Polish Chamber of Commerce and Industries. The city's Sikh Gurdwara the only Sikh shrine in the whole of Central Europe, and it is the place where both Sikhs and Sindhi's come together to celebrate Baisakhi. The Kerala Association of Poland conducts Onam, the festival of Keralites year on year, headed by Pradeep Nayar and Chandramohan Nallur. The Association of Bengalis in Poland headed by Pradipto Maulik together with Durga Puja Committee conduct the 3–4 day long festival of Durga Puja. Durgotsav is the largest Indian community festival in Poland. Gujaratis, who came from the state of Gujarat,Marathis, who came from state of Maharashtra and Tamils, who came from the state of Tamil Nadu in India and other Indian communities from its other regions also have their associations and celebrate Holi, Dandya and Pongal respectively.

== See also ==
- India–Poland relations
- Hinduism in Poland
- Romani people in Poland
