= Gadadhara Pandita =

Incarnation of Srimati Radharani

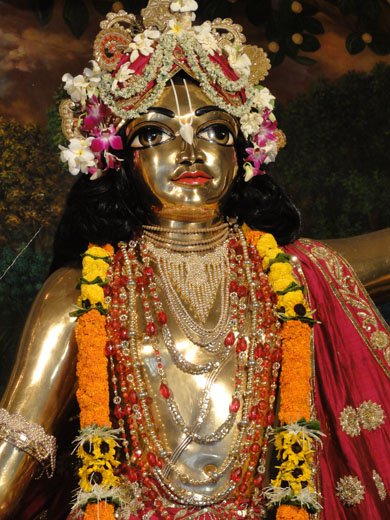
- Deity of Gadadhara Pandita, ISKCON Mayapur

Personal life
- Known for: Expounded Gaudiya Vaishnavism, Bhakti yoga along with Chaitanya Mahaprabhu
- Other names: Gadādhar Bhaṭṭ, Gadai

Religious life
- Religion: Hinduism
- Philosophy: Bhakti yoga, Achintya Bheda Abheda

Religious career
- Teacher: Pundarika Vidyanidhi (mantra guru)
- Reincarnation: Krishna's internal energy

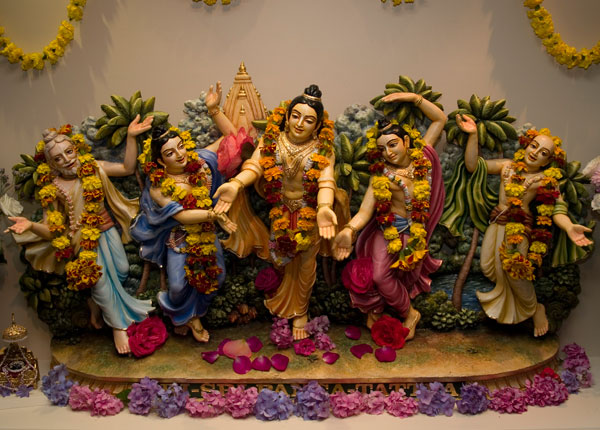
Pancha Tattva deities installed on a Vaishnava altar. From left to right (click on feet to go to article): Advaita Acharya, Nityananda, Chaitanya, Gadadhara Pandita, Srivasa.

Gadadhara Pandita (Gadādhara Pandita), also known as Pandita Goswami, was a close childhood friend of Chaitanya Mahaprabhu, the founder of the Hindu tradition of Gaudiya Vaishnavism.

== Life ==
Gadadhara is described as a handsome young boy, student of Nyaya (Indian logic) and ranked highest among the inner circle of Chaitanya Mahaprabhu's followers.

In the later part of his life, Gadadhara lived in the Tota Gopinatha Temple. As per the local temple legend (which is disputed), the central temple deity of Krishna sat down to accommodate Gadadhara's worship as he was old and feeble. Chaitanya lived a mile away during that time, at the Gambhira. He used to come to hear Gadadhara speak on Krishna while Gadadhara's eyes would rain tears. The first Radha deity installed in Vrindavan was sent by Gadadhara. The parakiya worship of Radha started from that time.

Some say that Chaitanya and Gadadhara disappeared on the same day inside the Gundicha Temple of Puri.

Devotees of Gadadhara would assemble at Govinda temple in Vrindavan. The Govinda deity was installed by Rupa Goswami, sometimes described as a disciple of Gadadhara. The temple head priest was Radha Krishna Goswami in the lineage of Gadadhara who wrote in the Sadhana Dipika that Gadadhara was Radha.

== Gadadhara Parivara ==
The Gadadhara Parivara (Parivara means 'family') is one of the traditional Chaitanya lineages that have continued till modern times; the Advaita Parivāra is another example.

Chaitanya Mahaprabhu personally gave Gadadhara a deity to worship, and the responsibility to teach the Bhagavata Purana. Gadadhara's guru was Pundarika Vidyanidhi. Gadadhara initiated Bhugarbha Goswami, and Bhugarbha Goswami gave rise to one line of the Gadadhara parivara.

Because Gadadhara is considered to be an incarnate of the goddess Lakshmi or Radha, his followers of come directly under her. The custom of the Gadadhara parivara is to worship the deities of Chaitanya and Gadadhara.

Followers of the Gadadhara parivara opine that Rupa and Sanatana Goswami, Narottama Dasa and his guru Lokanath Goswami were disciples of Gadadhara. Others hold that Sanatana Goswami was the disciple of Chaitanya or Madhusudana Vidyavacaspati, the brother of the logician Sarvabhauma Bhattacarya, and Rupa Goswami was the disciple of Sanatana Goswami.

== See also ==
- Haridas Shastri
- Satyanarayana Dasa
- Hare Krishna
