= Kali-Santaraṇa Upaniṣad =

Sanskrit text

- Devanagari: कलिसन्तरण
- Title means: To overcome the effects of Kali Yuga
- Linked Veda: Krishna Yajurveda
- Verses: 2
- Philosophy: Vaishnava

The Kali-Santarana Upanishad (Sanskrit: कलिसन्तरणोपनिषद्; IAST: Kali-Santaraṇa Upaniṣad), also called Kalisantaraṇopaniṣad, is a Sanskrit text. It is a minor late Upanishad of Hinduism.

The Vaishnava Upanishad was likely composed in 16th century CE. According to Gaudiya Vaishnava tradition, this text's central mantra, known as the Hare Krishna, or Mahā ("Great"), Mantra, was given in the 16th century to Chaitanya Mahaprabhu at his initiation in Gaya (though the Sanskrit mantra is absent from his biographies).

This mantra, presented in two lines, contains the words Hare, Rama, and Krishna. The word Hare, is the vocative case of "Hari" in Sanskrit. Another meaning given in the Gaudiya Vaishnava tradition is "O Harā" (the feminine counterpart to Vishnu, sometimes known as Hara), is repeated eight times, while the other two names are Hindu gods and are each repeated four times (or two forms of Vishnu, who is then invoked eight times as well). The text asserts that the audible chanting of this mantra is a means to wash away all the tribulations of the current era (Kali Yuga).

== Nomenclature ==
'Kali-Santarana Upanishad' means to 'approach or set about crossing over quarrel, discord, and strife':

- 'Kali' (Sanskrit कलि) means 'quarrel', 'contention', 'discord' or 'strife'.
  - Kali Yuga is the least-dharmic (e.g. least moral or religious) of the four cyclical yugas (ages or epochs) in Hindu cosmology.
- 'Santarana' (Sanskrit सन्तरण) means "conveying over or across".
- 'Upanishad' (Sanskrit उपनिषद्) means 'approach' or 'set about'.

== History ==
The text is one of the Vaishnava Upanishads, composed before about 1500 CE, and includes two verses called the Maha-mantra. Kali-Santarana Upanishad is the earliest known Hindu text in which this mantra appears. It was popularized by Chaitanya Mahaprabhu in the 16th century. The mantra later became famous through the Hare Krishna (ISKCON) movement.

In Vaishnava etymology, the word Hare refers to Hara (literally, captivating, carrying away), personifying goddess Radha, who is the Shakti of Krishna ("nada shakti", divine energy) and is described as the one who stole the mind of Krishna. The word Hare is repeated eight times in the Kali-Santaraṇa mantra and, in Gaudiya Vaishnavism, is associated with Radha and the eight phases of her love for Krishna. In Gaudiya Vaishnavism, its devotees assert that the effect of reciting this mantra in the Kali-Santaraṇa text is to imbue the innermost part of one's being with spiritual pleasure, to experience transcendental ecstasy, to revive deep consciousness through emembering the love of God, and to remove the harmful influence of the Kali Yuga. The Gaudiya Vaishnava traditionally asserted that the mantra should be recited audibly because the sound liberates the reciter and the listener.

In the anthology of 108 Upanishads of the Muktika canon, narrated by Rama to Hanuman, the Kali-Santarana Upanishad is listed at number 103.The Upanishad is not in the anthology of 52 popular Upanishads in north India by Colebrooke, nor is it found in the Bibliotheca Indica anthology of popular Upanishads in south India by Narayana.

== Contents ==
At the end of the Dvapara Yuga (the third out of four yugas described in Hindu scriptures), sage Narada approached Brahma and requested him to enlighten him on the path he should follow to alleviate the detrimental effects of the Kali Yuga. Brahma said that by way of taking the name of the supreme deity Narayana, all the tribulations of Kali yuga will be washed away. These sixteen names to be chanted are as:

Hare Rama Hare Rama , Rama Rama Hare Hare
Hare Krishna Hare Krishna , Krishna Krishna Hare Hare

When Chaitanya Mahaprabhu promulgated the Mahamantra, it was rendered with Krishna's name's first.

Hare Kṛṣṇa Hare Kṛṣṇa
Kṛṣṇa Kṛṣṇa Hare Hare
Hare Rāma Hare Rāma
Rāma Rāma Hare Hare

Chanting of the sixteen words mantra is asserted by the text to be constantly done by sage Narada, who with his musical instrument tanpura has been doing it for ages.

The Upanishad also states that in the Kali Yuga, Narada was the creator or Kali-Karaka of all conflicts or undesirable acts. However, Narada who is the arbitrator of the laws of karma (all deeds) himself approaches Brahma seeking redress to all the ills of this epoch. It also states that Narada roamed around the world holding a lute in his hand to adjust the laws of harmony as a result of a curse by Daksha. The sixteen mantras that Narada was advised to recite by Brahma relate to jiva the immortal soul which has sixteen kalas.

There are no rules and regulations to chant this maha-mantra ('great mantra'). It should be chanted always irrespective of whether one is in a pure or impure condition.

== Influence ==
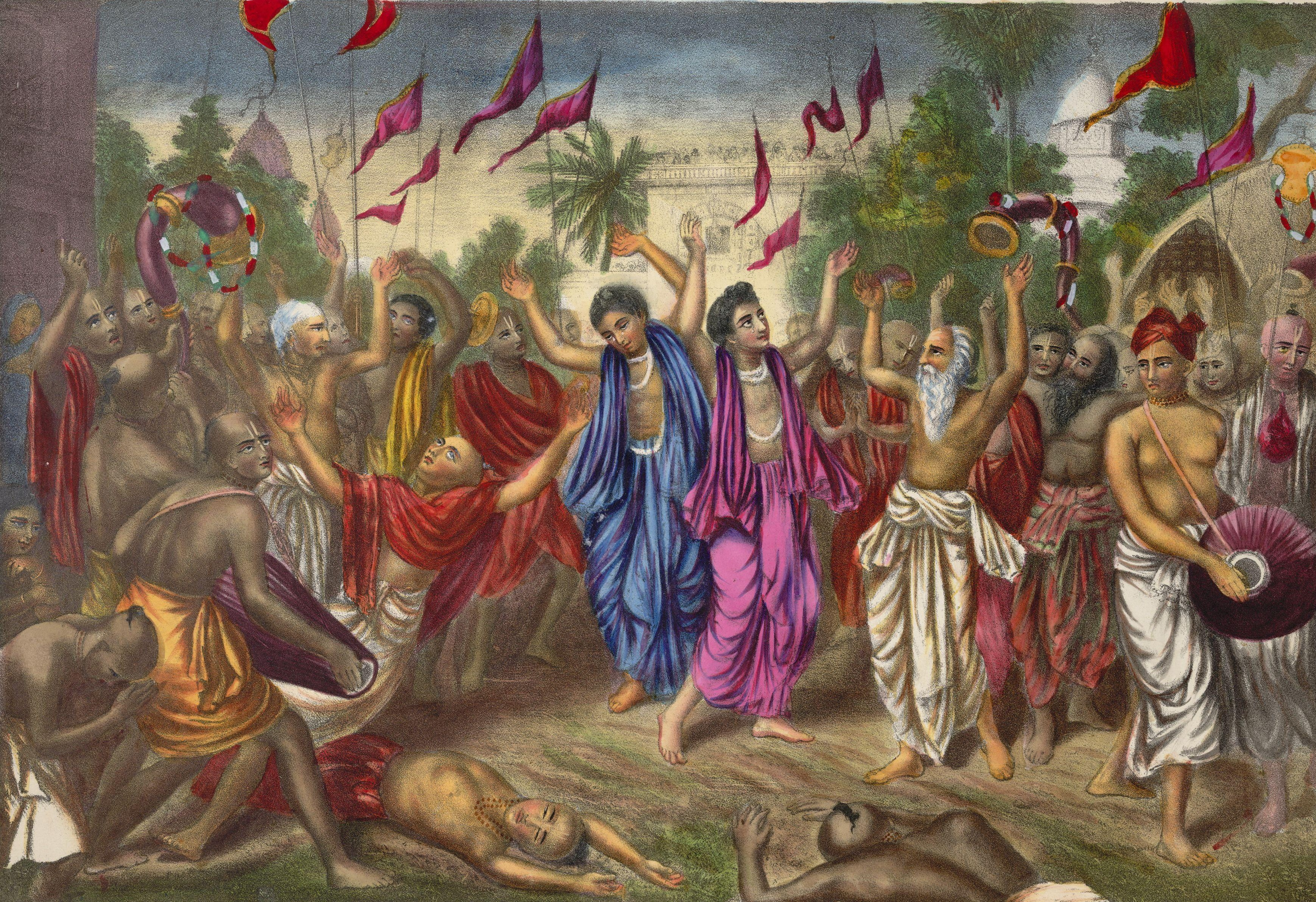
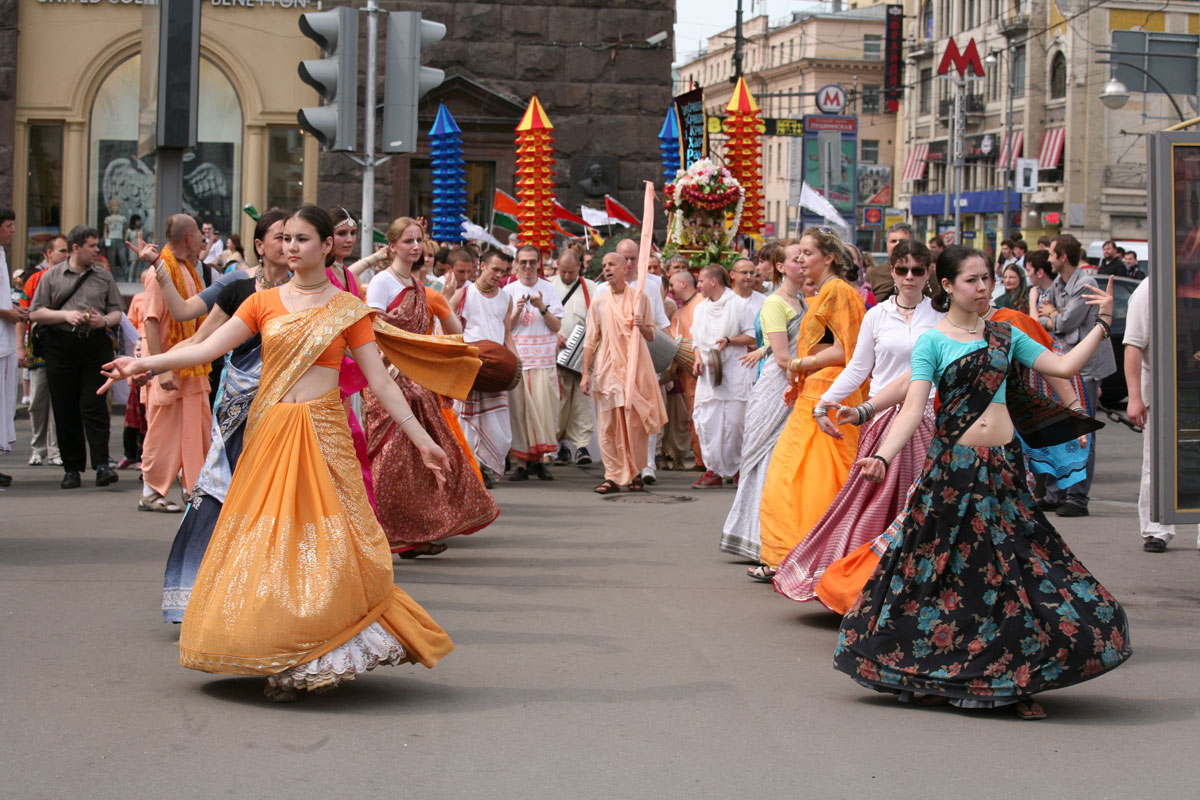
Devotees singing the Hare-Krishna Maha-mantra, in 19th-century Bengal (top) and modern era Russia.

The text has been influential on the Gaudiya Vaishnavism tradition, that grew in Gauda region of India in and near modern West Bengal, after it became the seat of Muslim power and Krishna devotees were forced into the service of Muslim officials.

From 16th-century onwards, in Gaudiya Vaishnavism, great importance has been given to public, vocal audible chanting or singing of the maha-mantra with the divine names of Hindu gods Krishna, Rama and goddess Radha (Hare). However, some other groups hold the view that chanting should be done silently or muttered in low-volume and would be equally effective. It was the view of Chaitanya and his disciples that chanting the name God's name (s) loudly would be most effective to obtain salvation and such a practice results in purifying the heart of both reciter and the listener, results in receiving the "love of God". This at least is the interpretation given in Rupa Goswami's Prathama Chaitanyaashtaka which states that Chaitanya himself had chanted this maha-mantra in a loud voice. For the Gaudiya Vaishnavas including ISKCON, the Hare Krishna maha-mantra also represents "transcendental sound" as the nature of the mantra is overwhelmingly qualified by Krishna and hence reciting it in "silence or in low volume" may not give the same effective feeling.

The 16th-century text Harinamarthah-ratna-dipika by Raghunatha dasa Goswami, gives the meaning of the maha-mantra where it is said that whenever Radha remembered Krishna and felt like being with him she chanted the maha-mantra; this made her feel closer to Krishna at the utterance of each syllable of the mantra.

The Maha-mantra of the Upanishad is part of the Gaudiya tradition legends, and the chant that was used to deconvert Muslims and initiate them to Vaishnavism in Bengal.

=== Chaitanya Mahaprabhu ===
In the biographies of Chaitanya Mahaprabhu, a Bhakti movement saint poet, the mantra he received when he was given diksha or initiation in Gaya was the maha-mantra of the Kali-Santarana Upanishad. In Gaudiya tradition, he is credited to have propagated it to the world along with Krishna bhakti.

=== Temples ===
The three unique words in the maha-mantra found in Kali-Santarana Upanishad represent the three deities, and paintings of their love filled legends, found in Gaudiya Vaishnavism temples.

== See also ==
- Atmabodha Upanishad
- Devi Upanishad
- Maha Upanishad
- Nirvana Upanishad

== Bibliography ==
- Bryant, Edwin Francis (2007). Krishna: A Sourcebook. Oxford University Press, Incorporated. ISBN 978-0-19-803400-1.
- Bryant, Edwin Francis, Maria Ekstrand (2013). The Hare Krishna Movement: The Postcharismatic Fate of a Religious Transplant. Columbia University Press. ISBN 978-0-231-50843-8.
- Deussen, Paul; Bedekar, V.M.; Palsule, G.B. (1997). Sixty Upanishads of the Veda. Motilal Banarsidass. ISBN 978-81-208-1467-7.
- Nair, Shantha N. (2008). Echoes of Ancient Indian Wisdom. Pustak Mahal. ISBN 978-81-223-1020-7.
- Prabhupada, A. C. Bhaktivedanta Swami; Prabhupada, Disciples of His Divine Grace A. C. Bhaktivedanta Swami. Veda: Secrets from the East. The Bhaktivedanta Book Trust. ISBN 978-91-7149-542-6.
