= Srivasa Thakura =

15-century Hindu religious figure

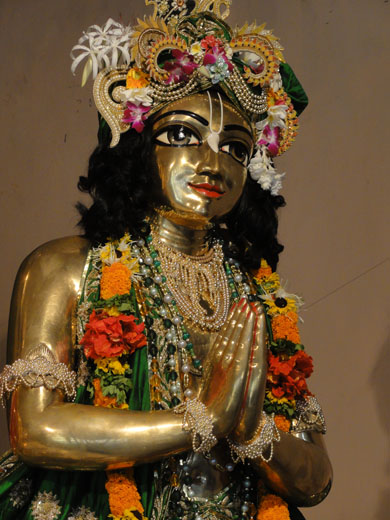
- Murti of Śrīvāsa Thakura, ISKCON Mayapur

Personal life
- Known for: Expounded Gaudiya Vaishnavism, Bhakti yoga along with Chaitanya Mahaprabhu

Religious life
- Religion: Hinduism
- Philosophy: Bhakti yoga, Achintya Bheda Abheda

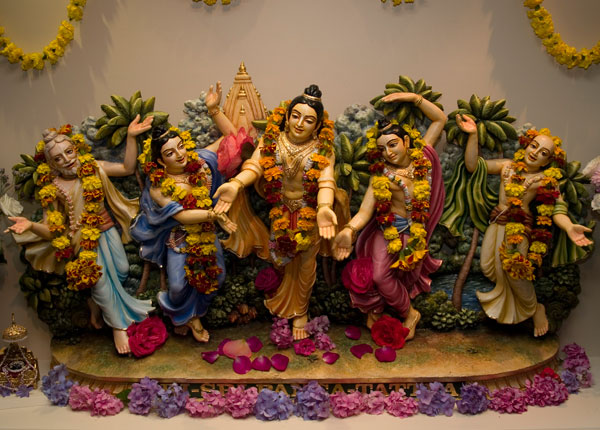
Pancha Tattva deities installed on a Vaishnava altar. From left to right (click on feet to go to article): Advaita Acharya, Nityananda, Chaitanya, Gadadhara Pandita, Srivasa.

Srivasa Thakura (Śrīvāsa Thakura) was a 15-century religious figure in Gaudiya Vaishnava tradition of Hinduism. He was a close associate of Chaitanya Mahaprabhu and is venerated as a member of the Pancha Tattva in the sect.

As per Gaudiya tradition, Srivasa is regarded as tatastha-shakti, a marginal energy the god Krishna. Devotees who are headed by Srivasa are described as "parts" of transcendental body of Chaitanya (his eyes, ears, hands, disc/cakra, etc.). Srivasa was devoted to the worship of Krishna and spread of his worship including conversion to Gaudiya Vaishnavism of adherents of Buddhism. Srivasa propagated the sankirtana, congregational chanting of Krishna's names. He studied the Bhagavata Purana with Advaita Acharya, who was at that time in Navadwip.

Srivasa lived in Srivasangam, where he preached sankirtana. Srivasangam was ruled by Kazi, a noted Muslim leader - who was initially opposed to Gaudiya Hinduism. It is said that Kazi had a vision of Chaitanya in his dream and after he which he promised not to oppose the ways of Srivasa.

Srivasa Thakura had previously lived in Sri Hatta, but because he wanted the association of devotees, he went to live on the banks of the Ganges in Nabadwip. Srivasa Thakura had three brothers: Sripati, Srirama and Srinidhi. He also had one son, but at a young age his son died.

== Pancha Tattva mantra ==
Srivasa is mentioned in the Pancha Tattva (Vaishnavism) mantra as representative of a pure devotee.

== Life and pastimes of Srivasa Pandita ==
Pastimes at his house in Mayapur More pastimes - Pastimes with Chand Kazi
