= List of Hindu temples in Poland =

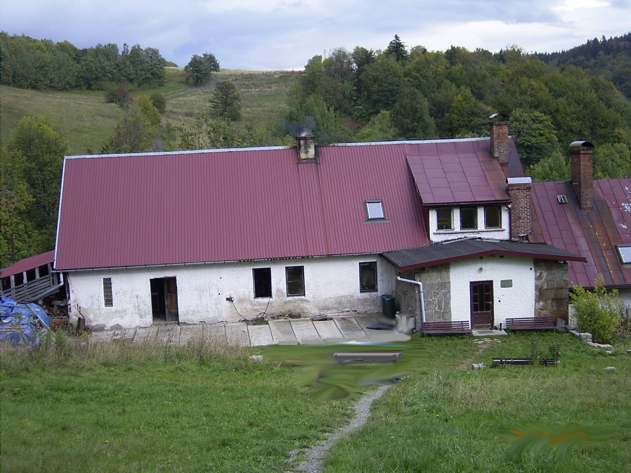
New Shantipur Temple in Czarnów in 2006, the oldest Hindu temple in Poland

This is a List of Hindu temples in Poland, by location.

== Czarnów ==
- New Shantipur (Nowe Śantipur) ISKCON (since 1980, the oldest Hindu temple in Poland).

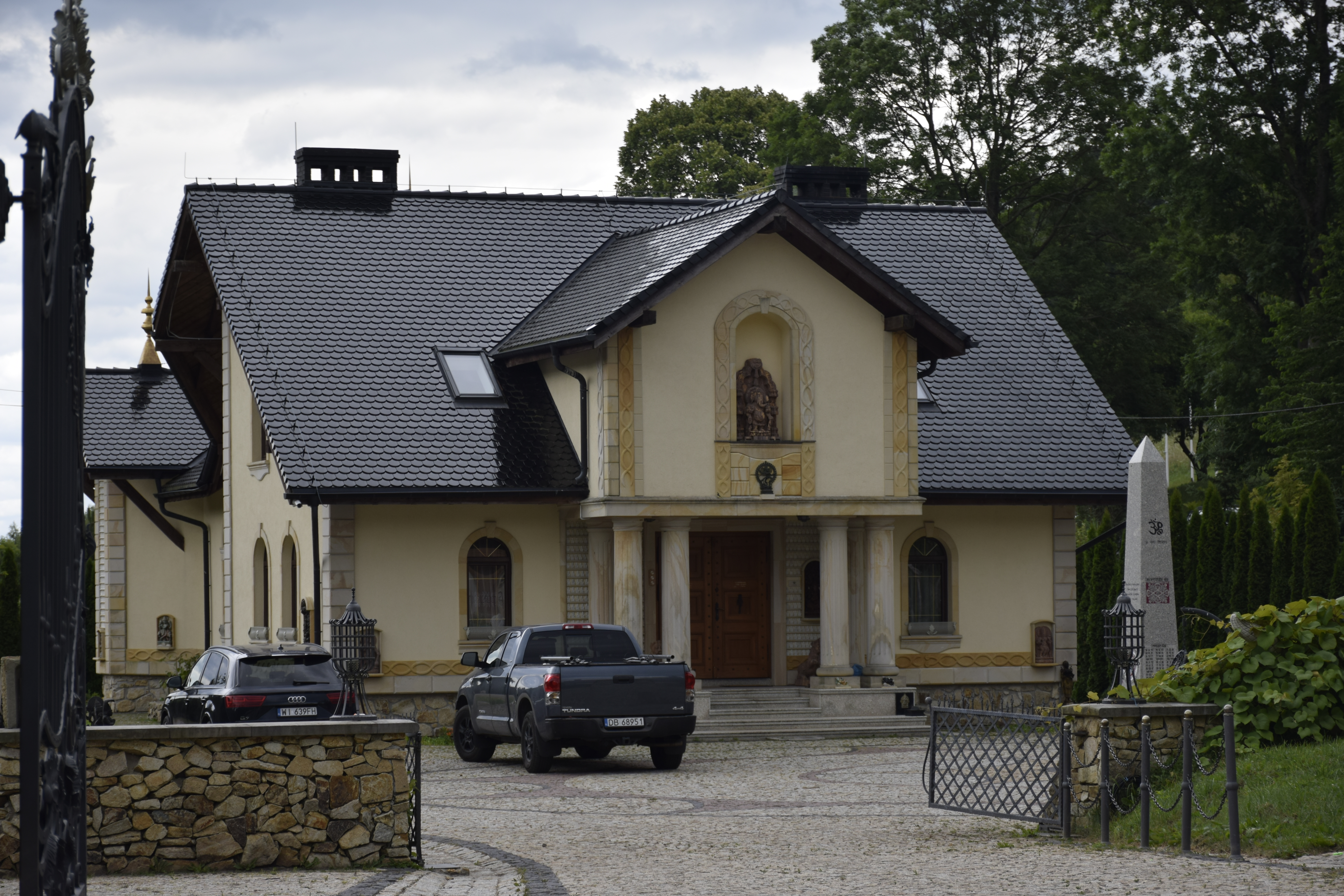
Shiva Temple in Czarnów

- Shiva Temple

== Mysiadło near Warsaw ==
- New Ramana Reti (Nowe Ramana Reti), ISKCON, since 1989.

== Warsaw ==
- Shree Vara Lakshmi Narshingadev (Śri Wara Lakszmi Narszingadew), Bhakti Marga Foundation, since 2009.
- Hindu Bhawan Temple, Kolonia Warszawska.
- Akshardham Temple Warsaw.
- Krishna Temple, Warsaw.

== Wrocław ==
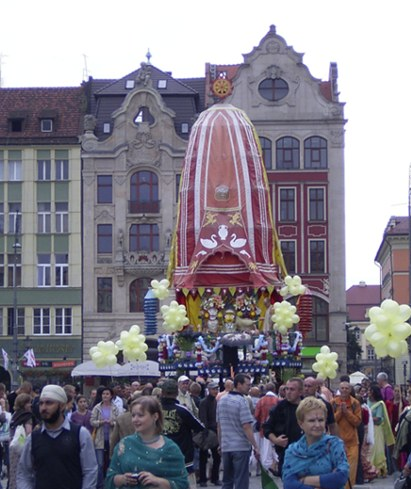
Ratha Yatra festival organised by the New Navadvip Temple in Wrocław in 2010

- New Navadvip (Nowe Nawadwip) ISKCON, since 1998.

== See also ==
- Lists of Hindu temples
- List of Hindu temples outside India
- List of large Hindu temples
