= Isvara Puri =

Indian monk

Ishvara Puri

Religious life
- Religion: Hinduism

Religious career
- Teacher: Madhavendra Puri Goswami
- Disciples: Chaitanya Mahaprabhu

Īśvara Purī was an Indian Vaiṣṇava sannyāsī in the Gauḍīya Vaiṣṇava tradition. He is considered a disciple of Mādhavendra Purī and the guru of Caitanya Mahāprabhu, whom he initiated at Gayā.

According to the Caitanya-bhāgavata, Caitanya Mahāprabhu met Īśvara Purī during his pilgrimage to Gayā and asked him for initiation. Īśvara Purī gave him a ten-syllable mantra (daśākṣara). The text does not name the mantra, although Steven J. Rosen identifies this mantra as the ten-syllable Gopāla mantra. Friedhelm Hardy also states that even though the exact mantra cannot be identified from the early references, the daśākṣara was likely the Gopāla mantra according to Bimanbehari Majumdar.

Later Gauḍīya sources include Īśvara Purī in the Brahma–Madhva lineage through Mādhavendra Purī. Friedhelm Hardy writes that this link was a later development and the early Gauḍīya sources do not mention any Madhva connection. Neither Mādhavendra Purī nor Īśvara Purī appear in the recognized Madhva guru lineages.

Krishnadasa Kaviraja has described in Chaitanya Charitamrita that:

the first sprout of the desire tree of devotion was manifested in the person of
Shri Madhavendra Puri, and that that sprout developed into a sapling in the person of Shri Ishvar Puri.
Then, in the person of Shri Chaitanya Mahaprabhu, Who was also the gardener Himself,
that the sapling became the trunk of an enormous tree-the desire tree of devotion. - (C. C. Adi 9.10-11)

== Life ==
=== Service to Mādhavendra Purī ===
According to the Caitanya Caritāmṛta, Īśvara Purī personally cared for his teacher Mādhavendra Purī, during his final illness. The account states that he cleaned his teacher and recited the name and divine activities of Kṛṣṇa to him and then Mādhavendra Purī blessed him for this service (Antya-līlā 8.28–31).

=== Mahaprabhu Taking Initiation From Ishvara Puri ===
During a travel pilgrimage visit, Ishvara Puri met Chaitanya Mahaprabhu in Gaya.

After immediately meeting Chaitanya Mahaprabhu addressed Ishvara Puri as,

"My journey to Gaya is successful just by My seeing your lotus feet. If one offers Pinda at this holy place, then his forefathers become delivered. But simply by seeing you, tens of millions of forefathers get liberation. Therefore your presence is even more auspicious than that of this holy tirtha. All of the holy tirthas pray for the dust of your lotus feet. Therefore, O Puripada, I am praying at your lotus feet to ferry me across the ocean of material existence and to cause me to drink the nectar from Krishna's lotus feet." - (C. B. Adi 1.17.49-55)

Shrila Ishvara Puri replied,

"Please hear me, I have understood that You are an incarnation of the Supreme Lord. This morning I saw a very auspicious dream and now that has actually materialized. From the first day I saw You at Navadwipa, I have always thought of You. I get such pleasure by seeing You, as much pleasure as I get by seeing Krishna."

Hearing this, Mahaprabhu bowed His head and smilingly replied,

"This is my great fortune."

On another day Mahaprabhu approached Shri Ishvara Puri and requested that he initiate Him with the divine mantra.

"My mind is becoming very restless in anticipation of this initiation. "Shrila Puripada very blissfully replied, "What to speak of mantras, I am prepared to offer You my very life." - (C. B. Adi 17.10)

Thereafter Shrila Ishvara Puri initiated Chaitanya Mahaprabhu with the divine Hare Krishna Mantra.

=== Ishvara Puri Visit to Mahaprabhu place ===
One morning Shrila Ishvara Puri came to where Mahaprabhu was staying. Mahaprabhu was extremely pleased to see him and after offering His obeisances He invited him to stay for lunch. Ishvara Puri replied that, "Being able to accept foodstuffs from Your hand is a matter of great fortune for me." Mahaprabhu Himself cooked and then very carefully served His guru the Prasadam. Afterwards He smeared sandalwood paste on his body and put a garland of flowers around his neck. Thus the Supreme Lord Himself taught how one should serve his guru. Without serving the great Devotees, it is not possible to receive love of Godhead. Service to the guru is the door to devotion.

On His return from Gaya, Mahaprabhu came by way of Kumarhatta, the birthplace of His guru, and began to roll on the ground in ecstasy there, as the ground became wet with His tears. Finally He collected some dust from that holy place and bound it in the corner of His upper garment, saying, "This dust is as dear to me as My life." then he set out for Navadwipa.

Thereafter Mahaprabhu accepted sannyasa and by the order of His mother came to live at Jagannath Puri. By this time Ishvara Puri had already left this world. He sent two of his disciples Shri Govinda and Kashishvara brahmacharis to serve the Lord at Nilachala.

== See also ==
- Gaudiya Vaishnavism
