= Advaita Acharya =

Indian Hindu guru and Vishnu devotee (1434–1559)

Śrī Advaita Acharya
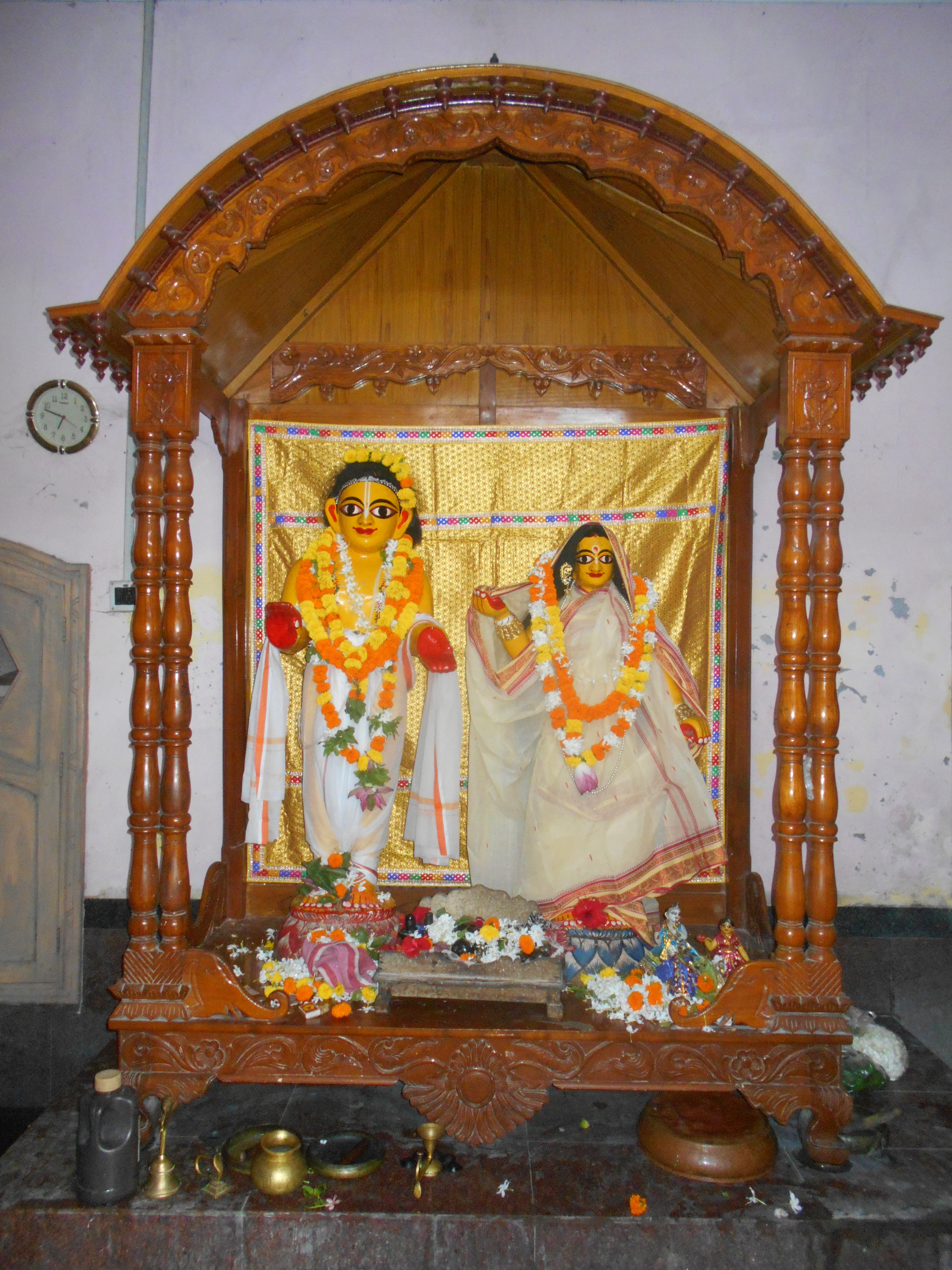
- Wooden deities of Advaita Acharya and his wife Sita Devi, Sitanath Advaita Mandir, Nabadwip

Personal life
- Born: Kamalaksha Mishra c. 1434 Nabagram, Laur Kingdom (present-day Badaghat, Tahirpur, Sunamganj District, Bangladesh)
- Parent: Kubera Acharya (father)
- Known for: Expounded Gaudiya Vaishnavism, Bhakti yoga along with Chaitanya Mahaprabhu

Religious life
- Religion: Hinduism Gaudiya Vaisnavism
- Philosophy: Bhakti yoga, Achintya Bheda Abheda

Senior posting
- Teacher: Madhavendra Puri

Advaita Acharya (IAST: Advaita Ācārya; 1434–1559) (born Kamalaksha Mishra; কমলাক্ষ মিশ্র) was a companion of the founder of the Gaudiya Vaishnava movement, Chaitanya Mahaprabhu, and guru of Haridasa Thakur. He was born in the village of Nabagram in Laud (in present-day Sunamganj District, Bangladesh), in 1434, some fifty years before Chaitanya, and spent most of his adult life in the town of Shantipur in Nadia with his wife and family. Advaita Acharya had six sons, Acyutananda Das (who also became a disciple of Chaitanya), Krisna Mishra, Gopala Das, Balarama Das Mishra (whose lineage became the zamindar of noakhali, chatkhil upazilla. later adopted the title Patwari & Majumder), Swarupa Das and Jagadisa Mishra.

Advaita Acharya contributed to two Sanskrit works, named Yogabashishta-Bhaishta and Geeta Bhaishya. The ancestry and life of Advaita Acharya are narrated in a number of hagiographical works, which include the Balyalila-Sutra (1487?) of Krishnadasa (Note: Krishna Das is the name of Divya Singha, the king of Laur. After becoming a fellower of Advaita Acharya, Divya Singha adopted this name.) in Sanskrit and the Advaitasutrakadacha of Krishnadasa, the Advaitamangala of Haricharanadasa, the Advaitaprakasha of Ishana Nagara and the Advaitavilasa of Naraharidasa in Bengali. Many of his activities are described in the Chaitanya Charitamrta, the Chaitanya Mangala and the Chaitanya Bhagavata.

== Life story ==
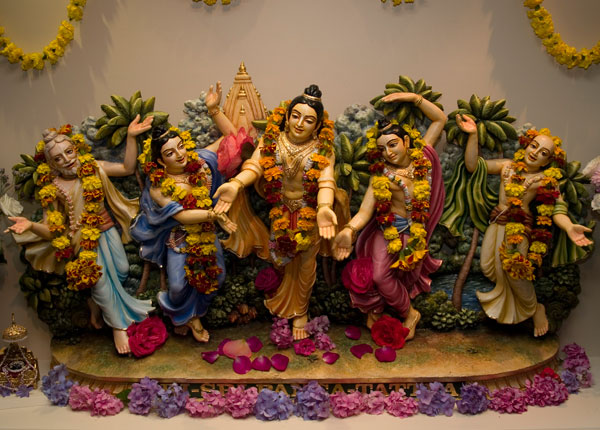
Pancha Tattva deities installed on a Vaishnava altar. From left to right (click on feet to go to article): Advaita Acharya, Nityananda, Chaitanya, Gadadhara Pandita, Srivasa.

Advaita Acharya was the son of Kubera Acharya. Kubera was the courtier of Divya Singh, the King of Laur. Kubera's father was Narsingha who was the minister of King Ganesha of Nadiyal.

In his latter years, Advaita became increasingly saddened by the pursuit of materialistic goals that, he believed, lead to a dysfunctional, unhappy society and concluded that the only solution was to offer prayers to the god Krishna and attract people back to the joy of the spiritual life. Advaita is said to have prayed for several months, crying out and worshiping him in the form of his Shaligram Shila with sacred Tulasi leaves and Ganges water. At the end of thirteen months during an eclipse of the full moon, his prayers were answered when Chaitanya Mahaprabhu was born.

Advaita was the first who proclaimed Chaitanya to be God by reciting the Vedic text 'namo brahmanya devāya go-brāhmaṇa hitāya ca jagaddhitāya kṛṣṇāya govindāya namo namaḥ' 'I salute Kṛṣṇa, Govinda, the god of brāhmaṇas who benefits cows and brāhmaṇas and the whole world.' He is known to have been a close friend of both Chaitanya and Nityananda in their mission of spreading the Hare Krishna mantra. Advaita's abode was the first place where Chaitanya took alms, and this is where he told Chaitanya "Wherever you are is Vrindavan." On the day marking his birth members hold a celebration in his honour and read and discuss stories of his life.

== Descendant ==
Advaita has many lineages from two of his children out of his six children namely Achyuta Nanda Mishra Goswami, Balaram Mishra Goswami, Swarup Mishra Goswami, Damodar Mishra Goswami, Gopal Mishra Goswami, Krishna Mishra Goswami. Bijoy Krishna Goswami, Mathuresh Goswami falls under one lineage. Poet, playwright & musician Dwijendralal Ray was a descendant of Advaita from his mother's side & so was Dwijendralal's son Dilip Kumar Roy.

== See also ==
- Hare Krishna (mantra)
- Chaitanya Mahaprabhu
- Advaita Parivāra
- Nityananda
- Avatar
- Pancha Tattva (Vaishnavism)
