= Gopalas =

Disciples of Gaudiya Vaishnava saint Nityananda

Religious life
- Religion: Hinduism
- Philosophy: Achintya Bheda Abheda, bhakti yoga
- Sect: Gaudiya Vaishnavism

Religious career
- Teacher: Nityananda

The Gopalas, or Twelve Gopalas (IAST: dvādaśa-gopāla, lit. 'twelve cowherds'), were a group of 16th-century Indian missionaries who are credited with spreading Gaudiya Vaishnavism throughout Bengal. They were major disciples of the Gaudiya-Vaishnava saint Nityananda (c. 1474–c. 1540), who is considered to be an incarnation of Krishna's brother, Balarama.

== Members ==
Kavi Karnapura's Gaura Ganoddesha Dipika lists 12 Gopalas: Abhirāma (or Rāmadāsa Abhirāma), Uddhāraṇa Datta, Kamalākara Piplāi, Kālakṛṣṇa-dāsa, Gaurīdāsa Paṇḍita, Parameśvarī-dasa, Dhanañjaya-paṇḍita, Puruṣottama Datta (or Nāgara-puruṣottama), Puruṣottama-dāsa, Maheśa-paṇḍita, Śrīdhara and Sundarānanda-ṭhākūra. In other sources, a 13th, Halāyudha-ṭhākūra, is added.

The more well-known Gopalas (for example, Abhirāma, Gaurīdāsa, Kamalākara Piplā, Puruṣottama-dāsa and Uddhāraṇa Datta) established "autonomous centres of power" known as sripats. The Gopalas were the "first organization [sic] within Gaudiya Vaisnavism and appointed directly by Sri Caitanya to propagate nama-dharma [the theology of the name of God (Krishna)]." They had the right to preach Chaitanya Vaishnava doctrine within their own areas and collect donations for their sripats, which they gradually developed into centres of Vaishnavism or even holy places.

Of the 12 main Gopalas, three were from the lowest caste, the shudras.

== Association with mythical gopālas ==
Like Nityananda, the 16th-century Gopalas were associated with figures from Krishna's lila, his playful pastimes in "mythical Vrindavan" – specifically the group of cowherds (gopālas) who "previously had been attracted to the activities of Kṛṣṇa and Balarāma". In "their personal piety" and devotion, the Gopalas are said to manifested behaviour "typical of Krishna and Balarama's male cowherd friends" in the Vrindavan lila.

As given in the Gaura Ganoddesha Dipika, the 12 Gopalas' spiritual identities are: Śrīdāma (Abhirāma), Sudāma (Sundarānanda), Vasudāma (Dhanañjaya), Subala (Gaurīdāsa), Mahābala (Kamalākara Piplāi), Subāhu (Uddhāraṇa Datta), Mahābāhu (Maheśa), Stokakṛṣṇa (Puruṣottama-dāsa), Dāma (Puruṣottama Datta), Lavaṇḍga (Kālakṛṣṇa-dāsa), Arjuna (Parameśvarī-dasa) and Madhumaṇḍgala (Śrīdhara).

== Upa-Gopalas ==
A separate group of 12 junior associates of Nityananda are called the upa-Gopalas (upagopāla, 'junior cowherds'). The upa-Gopalas were probably institutionalised towards the end of the 16th century in response to the increasing number of new claimants to the seat of Gopala.

== See also ==
- Nityananda
- Gopala-Krishna
- Gaudiya Vaishnavism
