= Jahnava Devi =

Indian philosopher (c. 1481–1541)

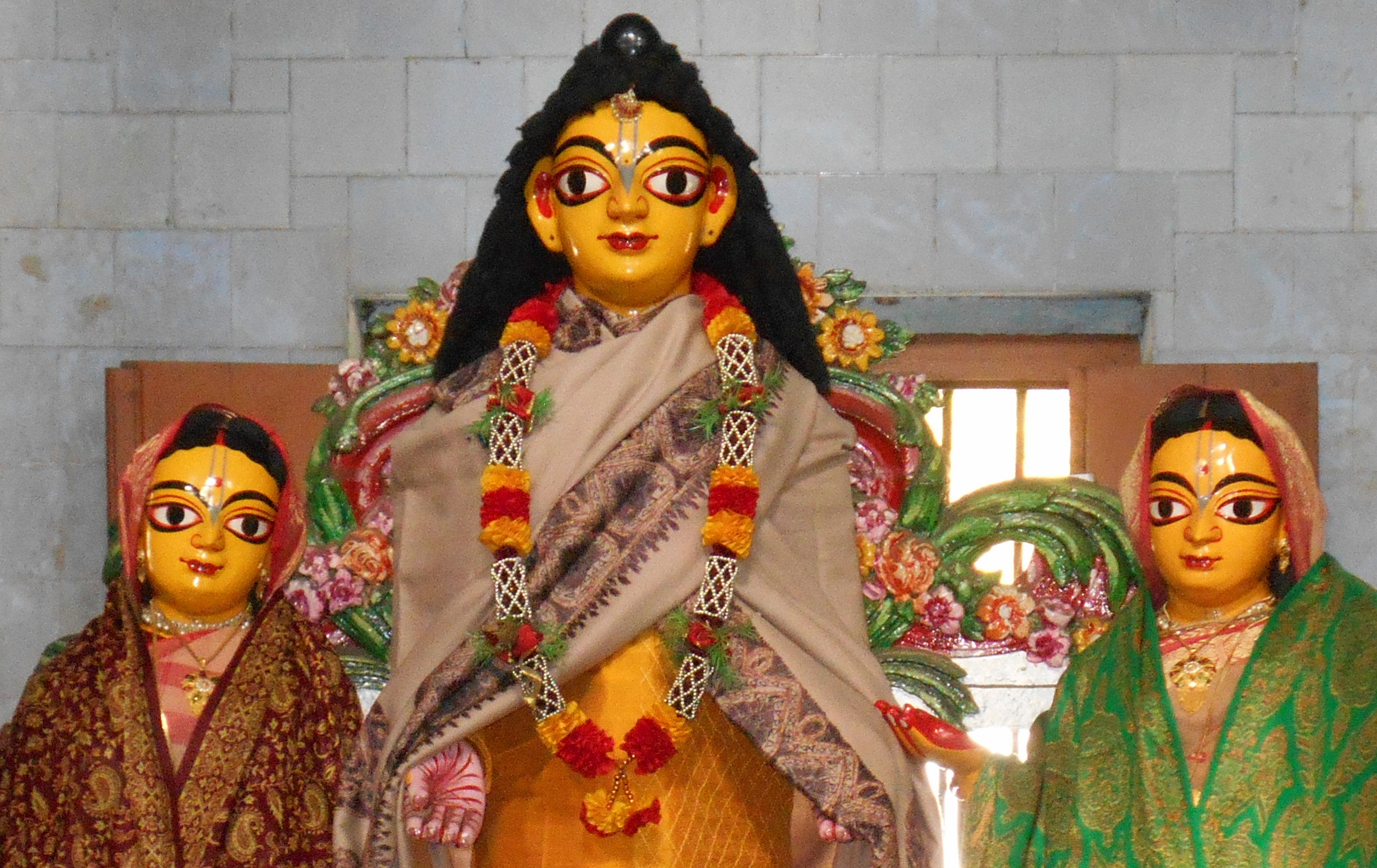
- Nityananda with his wives Vasudha Devi and Jahnava Devi at Sribas Angan temple, Nabadwip

Personal life
- Born: Janhava c. 10 May1509 Ambika Kalna, Bardhaman district, Bengal Sultanate (present-day West Bengal, India)
- Died: c. 1594 (aged 84–85) Vrindavan, Mathura, Mughal Empire
- Resting place: Vrindavan, India
- Spouse: Nityananda
- Children: Birchandra (stepson), Ram Chandra (adopted son)
- Parents: Pandit Suryadas Sarkhel (father); Bhadrabati Devi (mother)
- Known for: Codifying Gaudiya Vaishnavism
- Relatives: Gouridas Pandit

Religious life
- Religion: Hinduism
- Denomination: Vaishnavism
- Philosophy: Achintya Bheda Abheda
- Lineage: Brahma-Madhva-Gaudiya
- Sect: Gaudiya Vaishnavism

Religious career
- Teacher: Nityananda
- Based in: Vrindavan, India

Jahnava Devi (Sanskrit: জাহ্নবী দেবী); c. 1481 – c. 1541), also called Jahnava Mata, was the wife of Nityananda and a philosopher and saint from the Gaudiya Vaishnava school of Hindu Vedanta. She became a leading figure in Gaudiya Vaishnavism and a diksa guru and sampradaya head.

== Life ==
Janhava Devi was born in Ambika Kalna (modern-day Bardhaman district of West Bengal, India) and spent her childhood there. She is mentioned in Janhaba Astakam: Sri Jiva Goswami, confirming that she was widely known and a cherished figure in the Bhakti movement by about 1600 CE.

== See also ==
- Nityananda
- Gaudiya Vaishnavism
- Chaitanya Mahaprabhu
- Pancha Tattva (Vaishnavism)
