= Lakshmipati Tirtha =

Vaishnava saint

Shri Lakshmipati Tīrtha Shrīpādaru

Religious life
- Religion: Hinduism
- Order: Sanyasa
- Philosophy: Tattvavada

Religious career
- Teacher: Vyasatirtha
- Successor: Śrī Lakṣmīnārāyaṇa Tīrtha
- Disciples: Madhavendra Puri

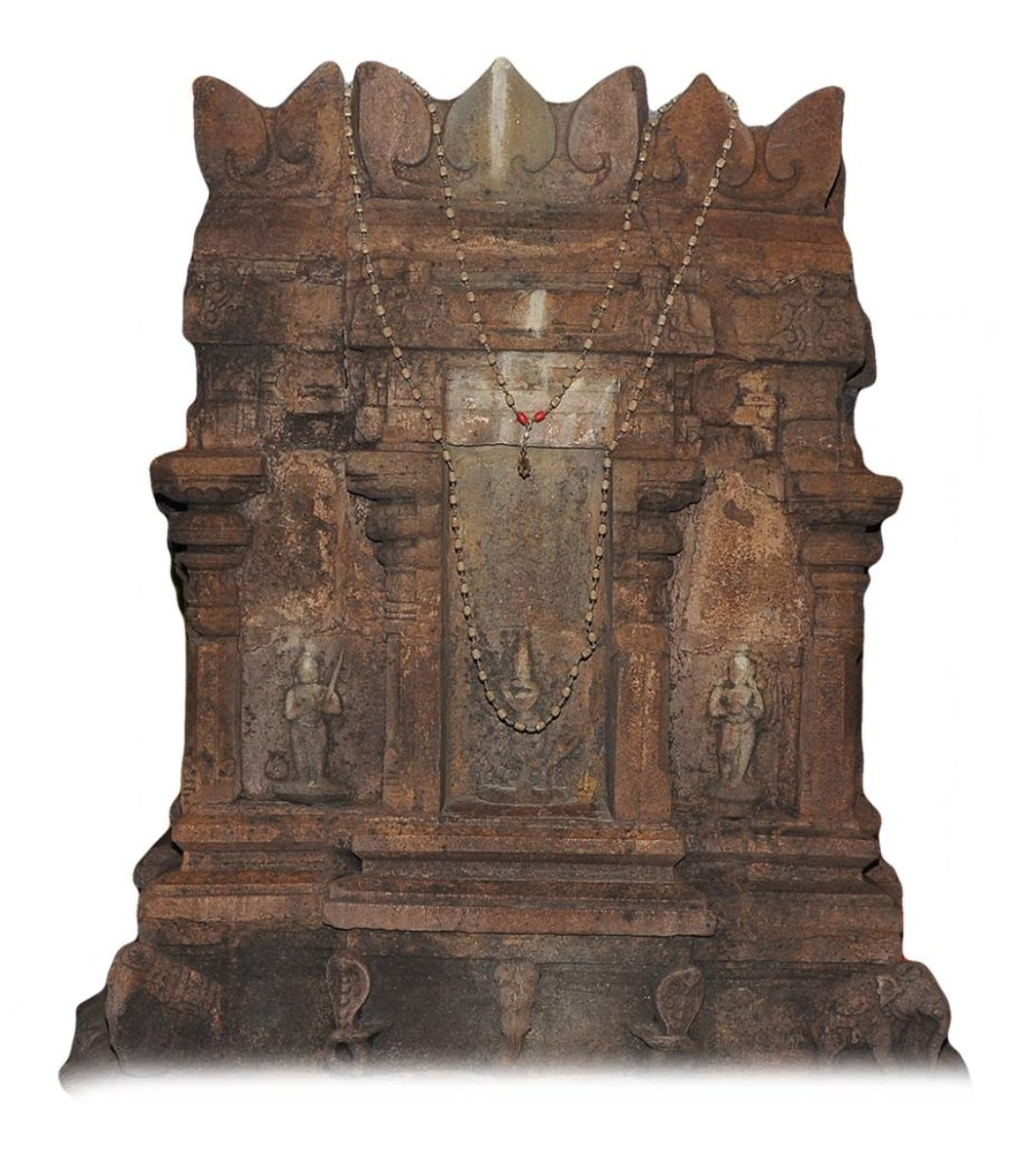
Vrindavana(consecrated final resting tomb) of Lakshmipathi tirtha at Sriranga kshetra

Lakshmipati Tirtha (1420–1487) was a Vaishnava saint, belonging to Madhva Sampradaya. He was a disciple of Vyasatirtha a proponent of Dvaita Philosopher, who gave him the name Lakshmipati Tirtha upon initiation.

One of the important vaishnavait of Brij area during the time of Vallabhacharya and Chaitanya Mahaprabhu, Madhavendra Puri was very likely initiated by Lakshmipati Tirtha.

Lakshmipati Tirtha is also credited as being the spiritual master of Nityananda Prabhu, although Madhavendra Puri is often given this title in other versions. The founder of the Hare Krishna movement, A. C. Bhaktivedanta Swami Prabhupada writes in his commentary on Chaitanya Charitamrita (Madhya-lila 8.128): "Sri Nityananda Prabhu was initiated by Madhavendra Puri, an ekadanda sannyasi. According to others, however, He was initiated by Lakṣmīpati Tīrtha."

In his work, Teachings of Lord Caitanya, Bhaktivedanta Swami writes (Chapter 31): "Similarly, Lord Nityānanda Prabhu and Śrī Advaita Ācārya also accepted a sannyāsī as their spiritual master, namely, Mādhavendra Purī, who was a disciple of Lakṣmīpati Tīrtha."
