= Bhakta Raghunath =

1960 film

- Theatrical release poster
- Directed by: Samudrala Sr
- Written by: Samudrala Sr; Samudrala Jr (dialogues)
- Based on: Life of Raghunatha dasa Goswami
- Produced by: G. Sadasivudu
- Starring: Kanta Rao; Jamuna; N. T. Rama Rao (Guest)
- Cinematography: Kamal Ghosh; J. Satyanarayana
- Edited by: V. S. Narayana; Harinarayana
- Music by: Ghantasala
- Production company: G.V.S. Productions
- Release date: 4 November 1960
- Country: India
- Language: Telugu

Bhakta Raghunath is a 1960 Telugu-language biographical film, based on the life of Raghunatha dasa Goswami, produced by G. Sadasivudu under the G.V.S. Productions banner and directed by Samudrala Sr. It stars Kanta Rao, Jamuna and N. T. Rama Rao in a special appearance, with music composed by Ghantasala.

== Cast ==
- N. T. Rama Rao as Lord Krishna
- Kanta Rao as Bhakta Raghunath
- Jamuna as Annapurna
- V. Nagayya as Swamy
- Gummadi as Balrama
- C.S.R.
- Relangi as Veeraiah
- Peketi Sivaram
- Suryakaantham
- Nirmalamma

== Soundtrack ==
Bhakta Raghunath

Film score by Ghantasala
- Released: 1960
- Genre: Soundtrack
- Producer: Ghantasala

Music composed by Ghantasala. Lyrics were written by Samudrala Sr-Samudrala Jr.

S. No	Song title	Singers	length
1	"Jaya Murali Lola"	A. P. Komala	3:21
2	"Rama Hare Krishna Hare"	J. V. Raghavulu	
3	"Anandamanta"	Ghantasala, P. Leela	3:25
4	"O Taralipoye"	Ghantasala	3:15
5	"Aagavoyi Aagavoyi"	Ghantasala	3:17
6	"Neegunaganamu"	Ghantasala	3:14
7	"Hey Sivashankara"	P. Leela	
8	"Konda Meeda"	J. V. Raghavulu, Jikki	3:19
9	"Samsara"	Ghantasala, P. Leela	3:00
10	"Ee Prasantha Vela"	P. Leela	
11	"Marachutaledu"	Ghantasala	3:36
12	"Narahari Bhojana"	Madhavapeddi Satyam, K. Rani	
13	"Laali Srivanamaali"	Ghantasala	
14	"Hey Jagannatha Swamy"	Ghantasala, P. Leela	3:20
