= Raghunatha dasa Goswami =

Indian philosopher

Srila Raghunatha Dasa রঘুনাথ দাস গোস্বামী Goswami
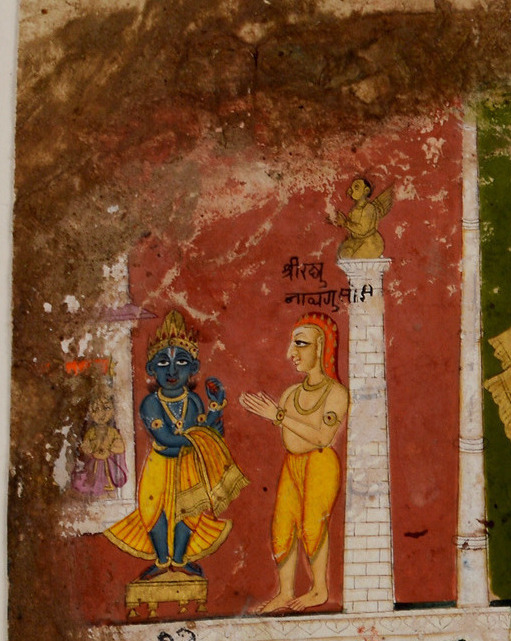
- Śrīraghunāth Gusāī, Bhaktamal illustration, Bundelkhand, circa late 18th century

Personal life
- Born: 1494 Krishnapur, Hooghly District of present-day West Bengal
- Died: 1586 (aged 91–92)
- Known for: Codifying Gaudiya Vaishnavism
- Honors: Six Goswamis of Vrindavana

Religious life
- Religion: Hinduism
- Denomination: Vaishnavism
- Philosophy: Achintya Bheda Abheda
- Lineage: Brahma-Madhva-Gaudiya
- Sect: Gaudiya Vaishnavism

Religious career
- Teacher: Nityananda
- Based in: Vrindavan, India

‘’’Raghunāthadāsa Gosvāmī’’’ was a disciple of Śrī Yadunandan Ācārya (see Vilāpa Kusumānjali, verse 4, Caitanya-Caritāmṛta Ādi chapter 12 and Antya 6) disciple of Advaita Acharya and one of the apostle of the Vaishnava saint Chaitanya Mahaprabhu, the principal six of whom are renowned as the Six Goswamis of Vrindavan. Together the Six Goswamis codified the philosophy and records which became the theological basis of the Gaudiya Vaishnava tradition. Among them, Raghunāthadāsa was renowned for his qualities of simplicity and renunciation.

== Background ==
Born as the son of a wealthy Kayastha landlord Govardhana Dāsa from Saptagram in Hooghly District of present-day West Bengal, Raghunātha Dāsa is said to have shown a particular disinterest in everyday pleasures and an interest in more religious pursuits from a relatively young age. This was much to the displeasure of his parents, who eventually took to hiring guards in order to prevent Raghunātha Dāsa from leaving the family home with the aim of having a spiritual life. Eventually Raghunātha Dāsa escaped their home and made a journey to Jagannath Puri where he met his guru, Chaitanya Mahaprabhu.

== Panihati Chira Dahi Festival ==
A major event that Raghunath Das Goswami organized was the Chira-Dahi festival at Panihati. Raghunath was visiting Panihati to meet Lord Nitai, who is incarnation of Baladeva, and his associates. Nitai requested him to feed chuda-dahi (curd mixed with chipped rice) to all the devotees who were present there. Raghunath arranged for the ingredients from the neighboring villages, and helped by his associates, prepared two kinds of chuda-dahi. One contained chipped rice mixed with curd, sugar and bananas; the other contained chipped rice mixed with condensed milk, sugar, ghee, and edible camphor.

Then the preparations were served out, and everybody enjoyed it.

== Regulated lifestyle ==
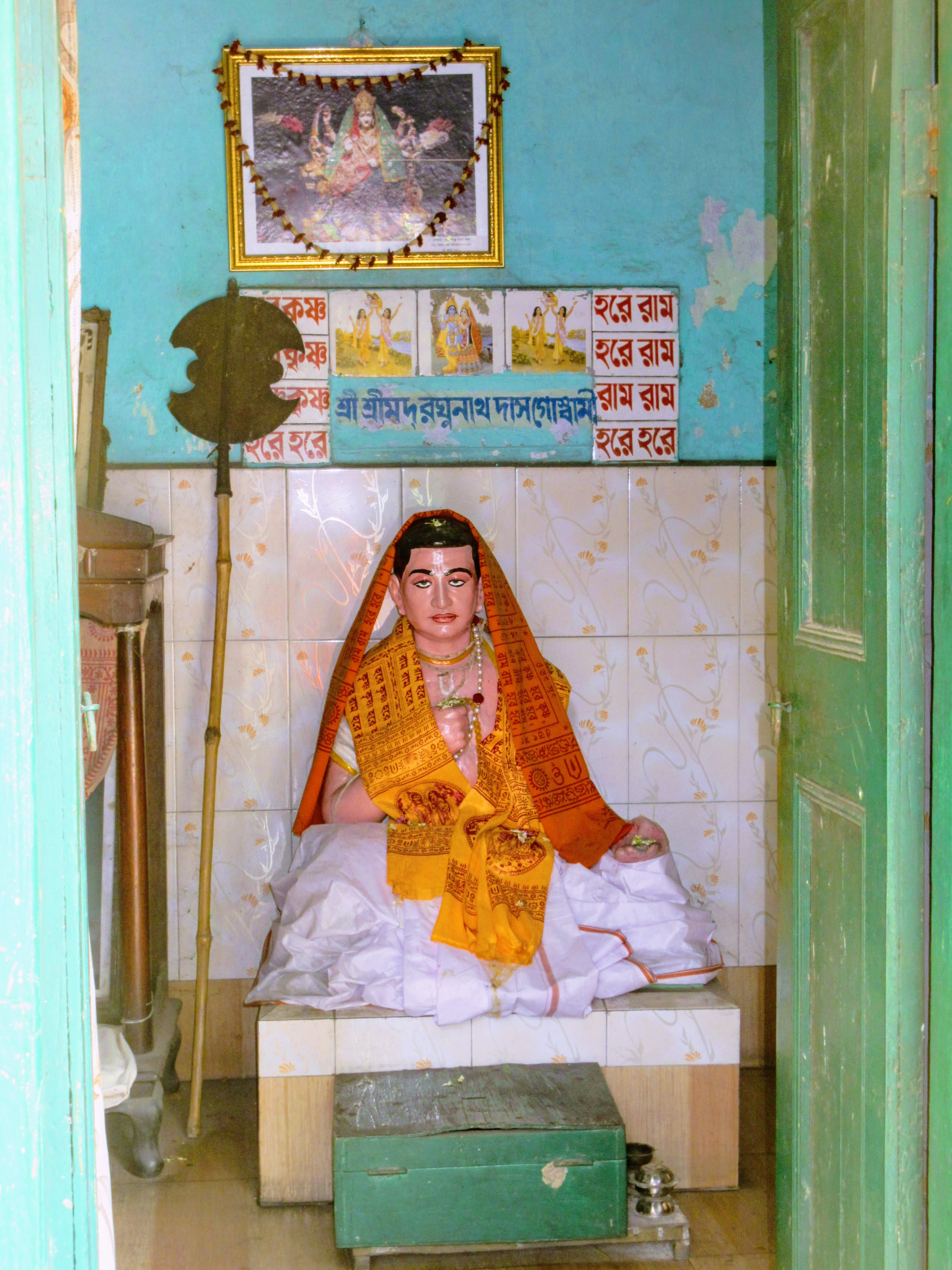
Raghunatha dasa Goswami

According to accounts in the Chaitanya Charitamrta, written by Krishnadasa Kaviraja Goswami, Raghunatha dasa led a life of extreme devotional practice, spending more than twenty-two hours out of every twenty-four chanting the Hare Krishna Maha mantra, and eating and sleeping for less than an hour and a half per day, and on some days that also was reduced. His clothes included a simple torn cloth and a patchwork scarf.

In this connection Raghunatha dasa is quoted to have said:

"If one's heart has been cleansed by perfect knowledge and one has understood Krishna, the Supreme Brahman, he then gains everything. Why should such a person act like a debauchee by trying very carefully to maintain his material body?"

Raghunatha Dasa Goswami served Chaitanya mahaprabhu for sixteen years at Jagannatha Puri. After which he went to Vrindavan in c.1543-44, where he lived for many years at a sacred lake known as Radha-kunda. His bhajana-kutir, or place of worship, still exists there and is visited by many pilgrims to this day.

== Main works ==
- Abhista-sucana
- Caitanyastaka (Stavavali)
- Dana-keli-cintamani
- Dana-nirvartana-kundastaka
- Gopala-raja-stotra
- Govardhana-vasa-prarthana-dasaka
- Govardhanasraya-dasaka
- Granthakartuh Prarthana
- Harinamartha-ratna-dipika
- Madana-gopala-stotra
- Manah-siksa
- Mukta-carita
- Mukundastaka
- Nava-yuva-dvandva-didriksastaka
- Navastaka
- Prarthanamrita
- Prarthanasraya-caturdasaka
- Prema-purabhidha-stotra
- Premambhoja-maranda
- Radha-krishna-ujjvala-kusuma-keli
- Radha-kundastaka
- Radhikastaka (Stavavali)
- Radhikastottara-sata-nama-stotra
- Raghunatha-dasa-gosvaminah Prarthana
- Stavavali
- Sva-niyama-dasaka
- Sva-sankalpa-prakasa-stotra
- Utkantha-dasaka
- Vilapa-kusumanjali
- Vraja-vilasa-stava

== In popular culture ==
=== Films and television ===
- Bhakta Raghunath is a 1960 Telugu-language biographical film, based on the life of Raghunatha dasa Goswami. Kantha Rao portrays Bhakta Raghunath in the film.

== See also ==
- Bhakti Yoga
- Hare Krishna (mantra)
- Nityananda
- Gaudiya Math
- International Society for Krishna Consciousness
- Krishnology
