= Madhavendra Puri =

Medieval Hindu ascetic

Personal life
- Born: circa 1420
- Died: circa 1490

Religious life
- Religion: Hinduism
- Order: Dvaita (traditional sources)
- Philosophy: Vaishnavism

Religious career
- Teacher: Lakṣmīpati Tīrtha (according to Gauḍīya Vaiṣṇavism)
- Disciples: Īśvara Purī, Advaita Ācārya

Madhavendra Puri (Mādhavendra Purī in IAST) (c. 1420–1490) was a 15th-century Vaishnava ascetic who was an early figure in the rediscovery of Braj.

== Biography ==
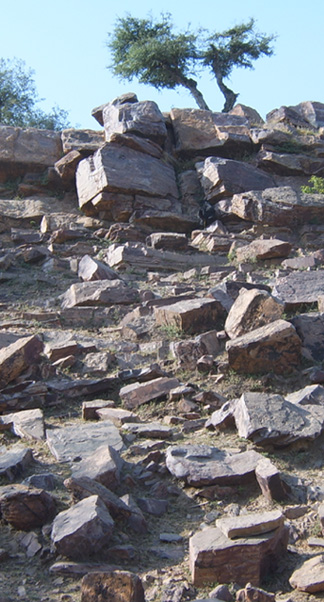
Close-up of Govardhan hill

=== Sectarian Affiliation ===
According to both Gauḍīya (Kavikarṇapura's Gauragaṇoddeśadīpikā) and Puṣṭimārga (Vallabhadigvijaya) accounts, Mādhavendra Purī (called Mādhavendra Yati in the Vallabhadigvijaya) was a follower of Madhva's Dvaita school. However, according to modern scholars he was likely a follower of the Shringeri Math of the Daśanāmī Sampradāya, who followed monistic Vedanta. The followers of the Madhva school themselves never mention Mādhavendra or his disciples.

According to Gauḍīya tradition, Mādhavendra Purī was the disciple of Lakṣmīpati Tīrtha. His main disciple is stated to be Īśvara Purī, and is also stated to have taught Advaita Ācārya and Viṣṇu Purī, and to a lesser extent Keśava Bhāratī and Rāghavendra Purī.

=== Worship of Krishna Image on Govardhan Hill ===
==== Gauḍīya tradition ====
According to Kṛṣṇadāsa Kavirāja's Caitanya Caritāmr̥ta, Mādhavendra Purī once circumambulated Govardhana Hill and bathed in Govinda Kuṇḍa. There he was approached by a cowherd boy who offered him milk, and later that night the boy appeared to Mādhavendra Purī in a dream, where he revealed himself as Gopāla. Gopāla revealed to Mādhavendra that he was hidden in a thicket from Muslim attacks, and that he was suffering due to being exposed to the elements. The next morning, Mādhavendra had the image of Gopāla removed from the thicket and installed in a temple on top of Govardhana Hill. Mādhavendra began the institutional worship of Gopāla by appointing Bengali Brahmins to the image's service. After two years, he had a dream where he was ordered to go to South India to get sandalwood, from which he never returned.

==== Puṣṭimārga tradition ====
According to a Harirāya's Do Sau Bāvan Vaiṣṇavan kī Vārtā, Mādhavendra Purī met Vallabha's son, Viṭṭhalanātha, which Entwistle states is a "distorted account".

According to the Caurāsī Baiṭhakana ke Caritra (19th century), there is mention of a Mādhavānanda Brahmacārī who teaches Lakṣmaṇa Bhaṭṭa (Vallabha's father) astrology. According to Śāstrī, Mādhavānanda was a student of Mādhavendra Yati who is confused for his teacher in this text.

According to the Śrī Govardhananāthajī ke Prākaṭya kī Vārtā (19th century), Mādhavendra Purī taught Vallabha in Varanasi, however this is considered "highly improbable" by Entwistle due to the dates of Vallabha's birth and Mādhavendra's death. When asked what he would like as a fee for teaching Vallabha, Mādhavendra asked to serve Śrī Nāthajī, as he had a premonition that Vallabha would establish the formal worship of the deity. When Mādhavendra Purī arrived at Govardhan Hill, the image was being already being worshipped as a snake deity by the local villagers, and as Kr̥ṣṇa by Saddu Pāṇḍe. Mādhavendra Purī adorned Śrī Nāthajī with a garland and turban decoration, and offered him milk (he was told by Śrī Nāthajī that he would only accept solid food when Vallabha arrived). The text also claims that Mādhavendra was appointed mukhiyā of the Bengali priests, which is also considered unlikely by Entwistle since the Śrī Nāthajī temple was built after his lifetime. Mādhavendra Purī later went to South India to get sandalwood, from which he never returned.

=== Initiating sankirtana movement ===
Madhavendra Puri is often accepted as initial inspiration or initiator of the movement of Chaitanya Mahaprabhu, who accepted Madhavendra's intimate disciple, Isvara Puri as his diksa guru. He is believed to have been preaching the principles of Gaudiya Vaishnavism prior to Chaitanya.

== Memorial ==
Madhavendra Puri died in Remuna. His memorial Samādhi and sandals are still worshiped there. It is a place of pilgrimage for many Vaishnava groups.

== More information ==
- BB Teertha (2001). Chaitanya: His Life and Associates. Mandala Publishing. ISBN 1-886069-28-X.
- "Giriraj Swami — Lecture – Madhavendra Puri Disappearance day". www.rupa.com.
- Hardy, Friedhelm - Madhavendra Puri: A Link Between Bengal Vaisnavism and South Indian Bhakti, JROS, no. 1, 1974
- Kaviraja Goswami, Krishnadasa. "Madhavendra Puri – references in Caitanya caritamrta online". vedabase.net. Archived from the original on 19 March 2012.
