= Pancha Tattva (Vaishnavism) =

Five aspects of divinity within Gaudiya Vaishnavism

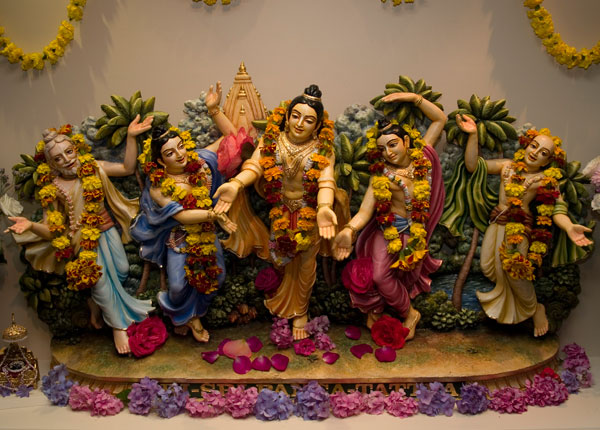
Pancha Tattva deities installed on a Vaishnava altar. From left to right (click on feet to go to article): Advaita Acharya, Nityananda, Chaitanya, Gadadhara Pandita, Srivasa.

Pancha Tattva (Devanagari: पञ्चतत्त्व; IAST: pañca-tattva, from Sanskrit pañca meaning "five" and tattva "truth" or "reality") in the Gaudiya Vaishnavism tradition of Hinduism refers to five 15th-century religious figures, venerated as the five aspects of the god Krishna.

== Background ==
In Gaudiya Vaishnavism, these five features of God (Krishna) are believed to have incarnated on Earth as five people in the late 15th century: Chaitanya Mahaprabhu, Nityananda, Advaita Acharya, Gadadhara Pandit and Srivasa Thakur. They famously spread the Krishna mantra and the practise of devotion (bhakti) towards Krishna throughout India.

- Chaitanya is regarded as manifestation of Krishna (Svayam Bhagavan).
- Nityananada is Krishna's first personal expansion with the combined power of the god Balarama, brother of Krishna.
- Advaita Acharya is the combined power of the deities Vishnu and Shiva
- Srivasa is Krishna's pure devotee and symbolizes devotion (Bhakti).
- Gadadhara is the combined power of Krishna's internal energy (Shakti).

"I offer my obeisances unto the Supreme Lord, [(Krishna)], who is nondifferent from His features as a devotee [(bhakta-rūpa; Chaitanya)], devotional incarnation [(svarūpakam; Nityananada)], devotional manifestation [(bhaktāvatāraṁ; Advaita)], pure devotee [(bhaktākhyaṁ; Srivasa)], and devotional energy [(bhakta-śaktikam; Gadadhara)]."

— Chaitanya Charitamrita Adi 1.147.6

== Pancha Tattva mantra ==
Within the Gaudiya tradition, a mantra formed from the names of the five members of the Pancha Tattva is often spoken or sung as a means of devotional worship, or japa. Often, this mantra is sung or chanted prior to the Krishna mantra.

jaya sri-krishna-chaitanya
prabhu nityananda
sri-adwaita gadadhara
shrivasadi-gaura-bhakta-vrinda

An alternative version features another name for Chaitanya, "Gauranga":

śrī-gaurāṅga nityānānda, śrī-advaita-candra,
gadādhara śrīvāsādi-gaura-bhakta-vṛnda

== See also ==
- Bhakti Yoga
- Chaitanya Charitamrita
- Panchatattva (Tantra)
- Six Goswamis of Vrindavan
- Vaishnavism
