= Mysiadło =

- Village
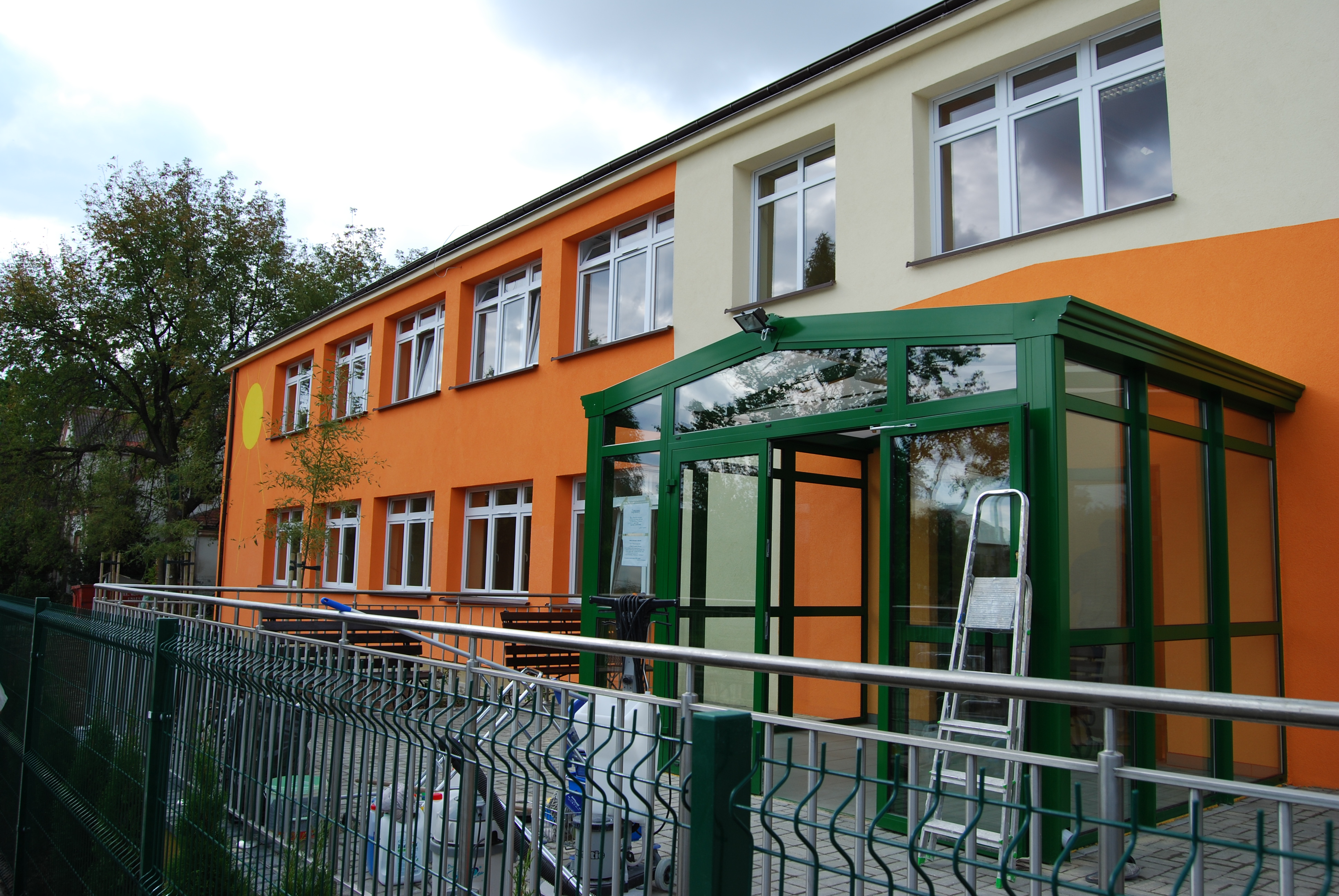
- Primary school in Mysiadło

- Location within Poland
- Coordinates: 52°5′52″N 21°1′8″E
- Country: Poland
- Voivodeship: Masovian
- County: Piaseczno
- Gmina: Lesznowola
- Elevation: 107 m (351 ft)
- Population: 3,000
- Time zone: UTC+1 (CET)
  - Summer (DST): UTC+2 (CEST)
- Vehicle registration: WPI
- Primary airport: Warsaw Chopin Airport

Mysiadło [mɨˈɕadwɔ] is a village situated in the administrative district of Gmina Lesznowola, within Piaseczno County, Masovian Voivodeship, in east-central Poland.

The population of the village amounts to 3,000.
