= Czarnów, Lower Silesian Voivodeship =

Czarnów
- Village
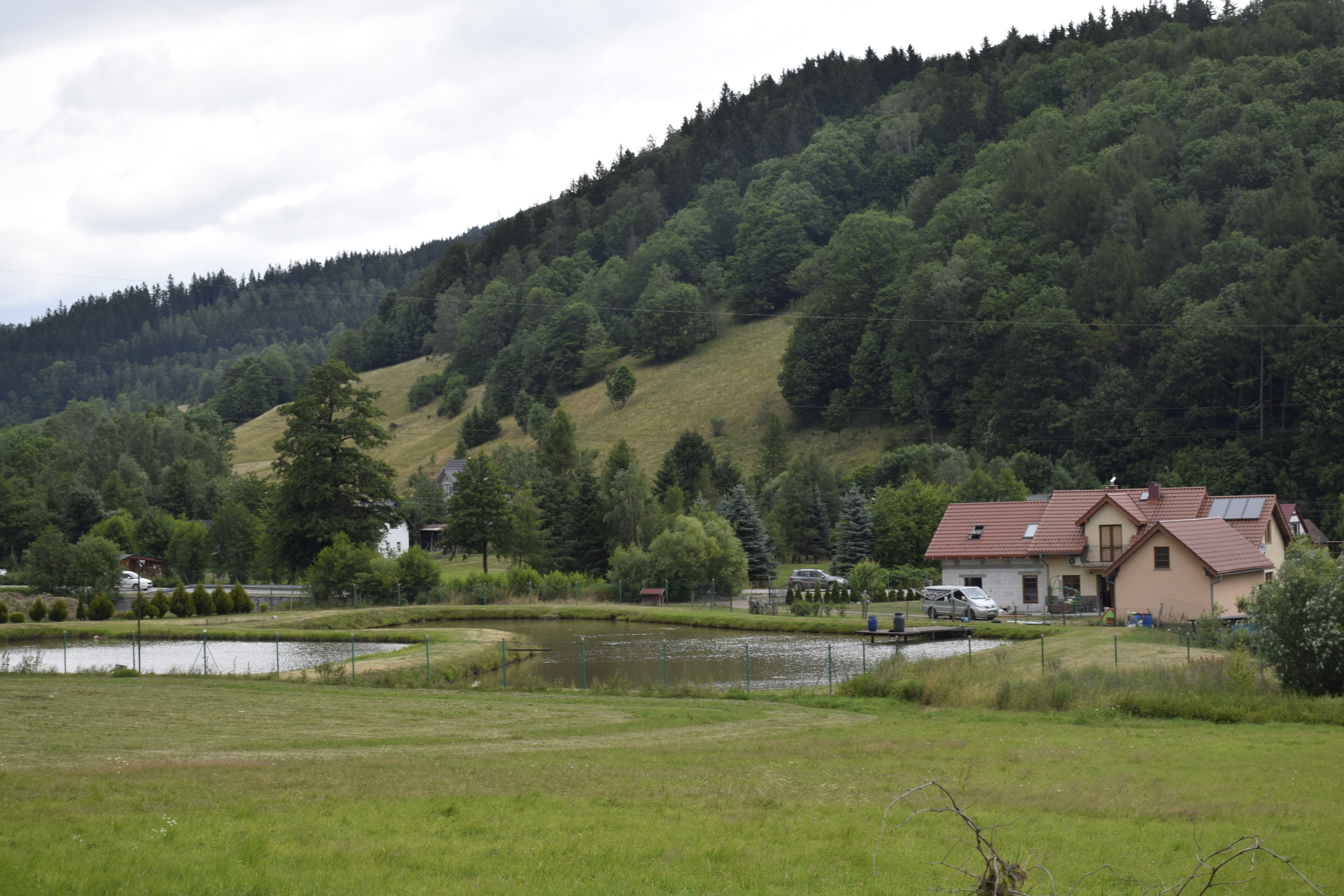

- Location within Poland
- Coordinates: 50°47′50″N 15°54′32″E
- Country: Poland
- Voivodeship: Lower Silesian
- County: Kamienna Góra
- Gmina: Kamienna Góra
- Time zone: UTC+1 (CET)
  - Summer (DST): UTC+2 (CEST)
- Vehicle registration: DKA

Czarnów [ˈt͡ʂarnuf] is a village in the administrative district of Gmina Kamienna Góra, within Kamienna Góra County, Lower Silesian Voivodeship, in south-western Poland.
