= Nityananda =

Hindu saint (born c. 1474)

Sri Nityananda Prabhu
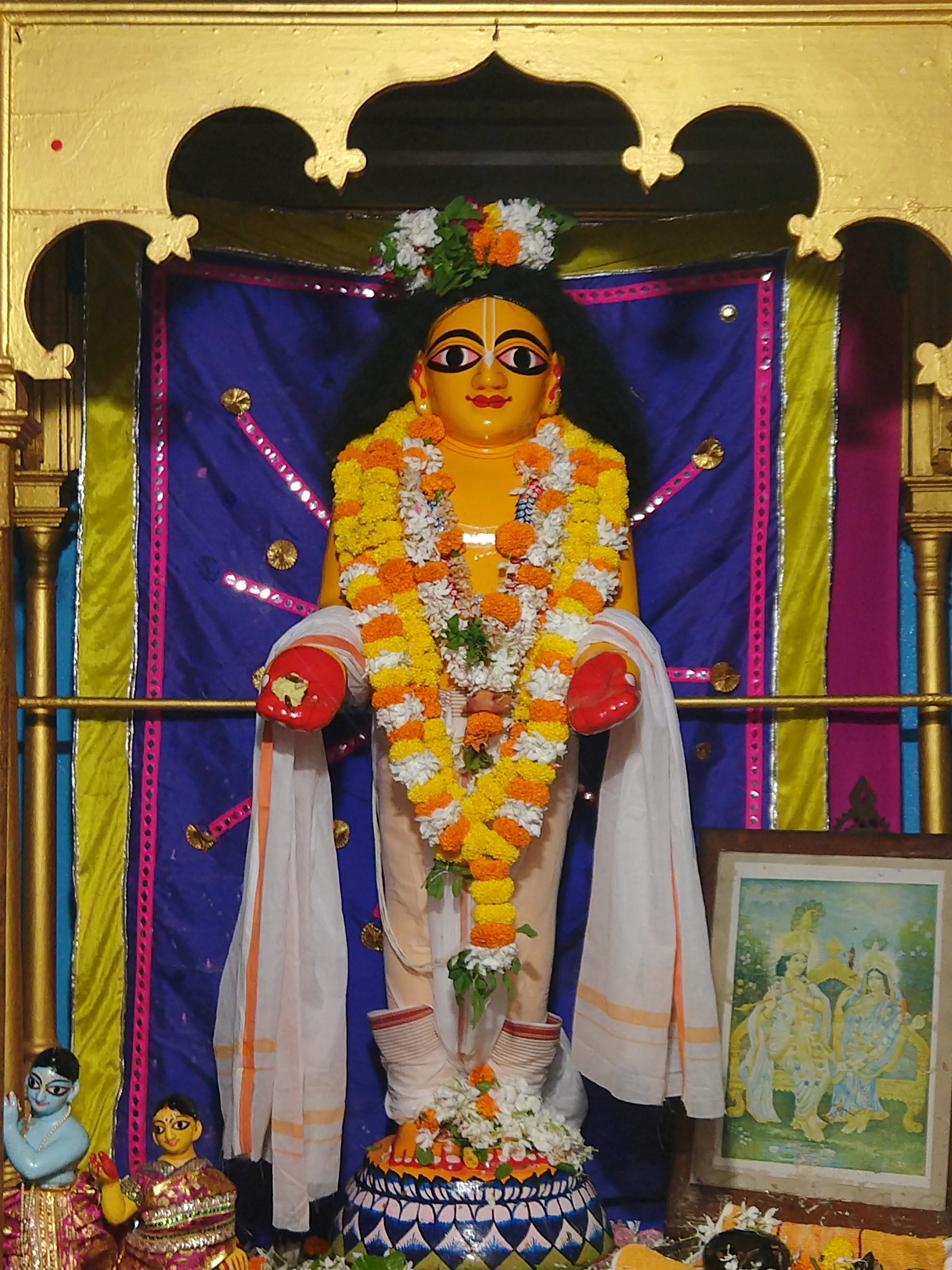
- Wooden vigraha of Nityananda, Nitai Bari, Nabadwip

Personal life
- Born: c. 1474 Ekachakra, Bengal Sultanate (present-day Birchandrapur, West Bengal, India)
- Died: c. 1540
- Spouse: Jahnava and Vasudha
- Parents: Hadai Pandit (father); Padmavati Devi (mother)
- Known for: Expounded Gaudiya Vaishnavism, Bhakti yoga along with Chaitanya Mahaprabhu

Religious life
- Religion: Hinduism
- Philosophy: Bhakti yoga, Achintya Bheda Abheda

Religious career
- Teacher: Madhavendra Puri (mantra guru)
- Disciples: Gopalas

Nityananda (Bengali: নিত্যানন্দ, IAST: Nityānanda; c. 1474-c. 1540), also called Nityananda Prabhu and Nitai, was a primary religious figure within the Gaudiya Vaishnava tradition of Bengal. Nityananda was Chaitanya Mahaprabhu's friend and disciple. Chaitanya and Nityananda are often mentioned together as Gaura-Nitai (Gaura, referring to Chaitanya) or Nimai-Nitai (Nimai being a name of Chaitanya).

According to Gaudiya-Vaishnava tradition, Nityananda is Balarama Himself (so is also called Nityananda Rama, where Rama refers to Balarama), with Chaitanya being His eternal brother and friend, Krishna. Chaitanya is considered the "most merciful" incarnation of Krishna as Svayam bhagavan.

Bhaktisiddhanta Sarasvati, the early 20th-century Gaudiya-Vaishnava reformer, writes about Nityananda's theological position as the embodiment of the mercy of the guru: "Nityananda is the Primary Manifestive Constituent of the Divinity. Nityananda alone possesses the distinctive function of the guru. In Nityananda, the function is embodied. Nityananda is the servant-God."

== Life ==
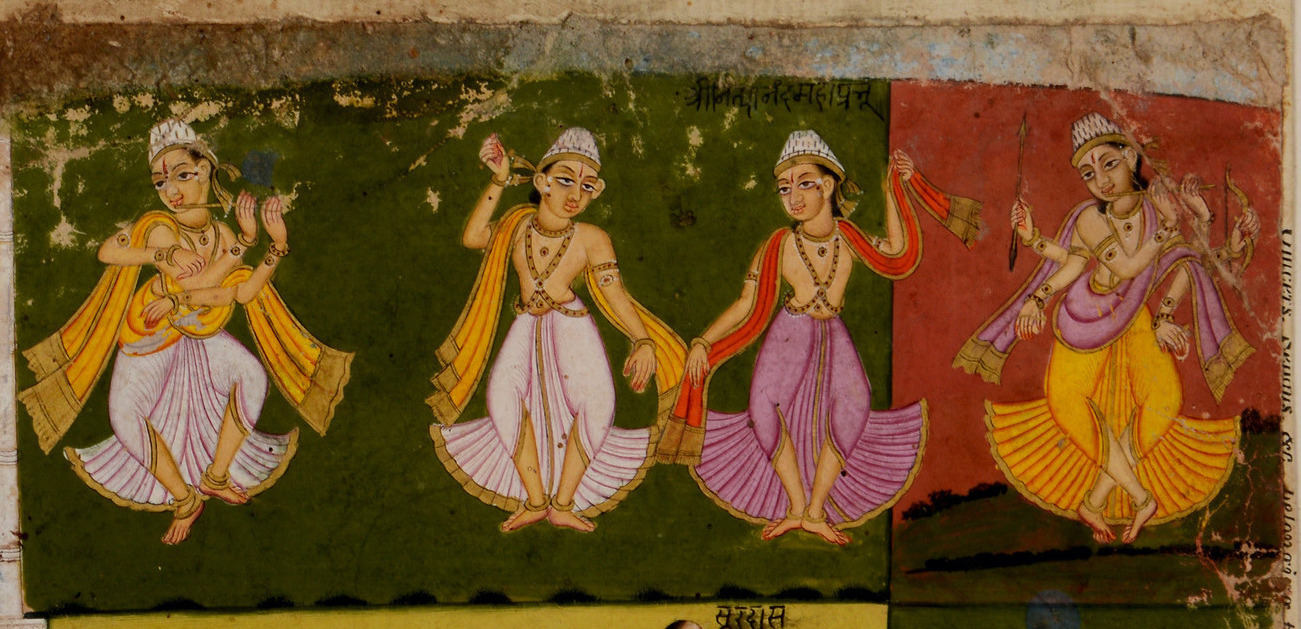
Śrīnityānandamahāprabhū, one of Caitainya’s companions, Bhaktamal illustration, Bundelkhand, circa late 18th century

Nityananda was born to a religious Bengali Brahmin called Pandit Hadai, and his wife, Padmavati, in Ekachakra around 1474. His devotion and great talent for singing Vaishnava hymns (bhajan) were apparent from a very early age. In his youth, he generally played the part of Lakshman, the god Rama's younger brother, in dramatic re-enactments of Rama's pastimes, along with the other boys of Ekachakra.

At the age of thirteen, Nityananda left home with a travelling renunciate (sannyasi) known as Lakshmipati Tirtha. Nityananda's father, Hadai, offered Lakshmipati anything he wished as a gift, who replied that he was in need of someone to assist him in his travels to the holy places, and that Nityananda would be perfect for the job. As he had given his word, Hadai agreed, and Nityananda joined Lakshmipati in his travels. Apart from Lakshmipati, who at some point initiated him, Nityananda was also associated with Lakshmipati's other disciples: Madhavendra Puri, Advaita Acharya, and Ishvara Puri, the spiritual master of Chaitanya Mahaprabhu.

He died sometime between the years 1540 and 1544.

=== Marriage and descendants ===
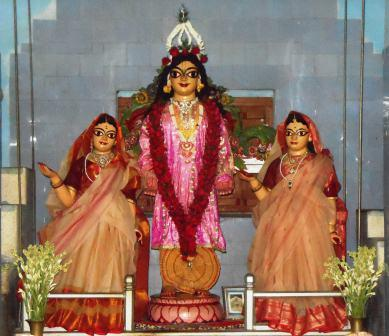
Prabhu Nityananda, Mata Vasudha (left), Mata Janhava (right) (Srivas Angan, Nabadwip, WB)

Nityananda married two daughters of Suryadasa Sarakhela: Vasudha and Jahnava Devi with the help of Uddharan Dutta Thakura of Saptogram. After marriage, he settled in Khardaha, 24 Parganas, West Bengal. He had a son, Virachandra Goswami or Virabhadra (who was later initiated to Vaishnava rites by his co-mother Jahnava Devi) and a daughter, Ganga, by his first wife, Vasudha.

== Legacy ==
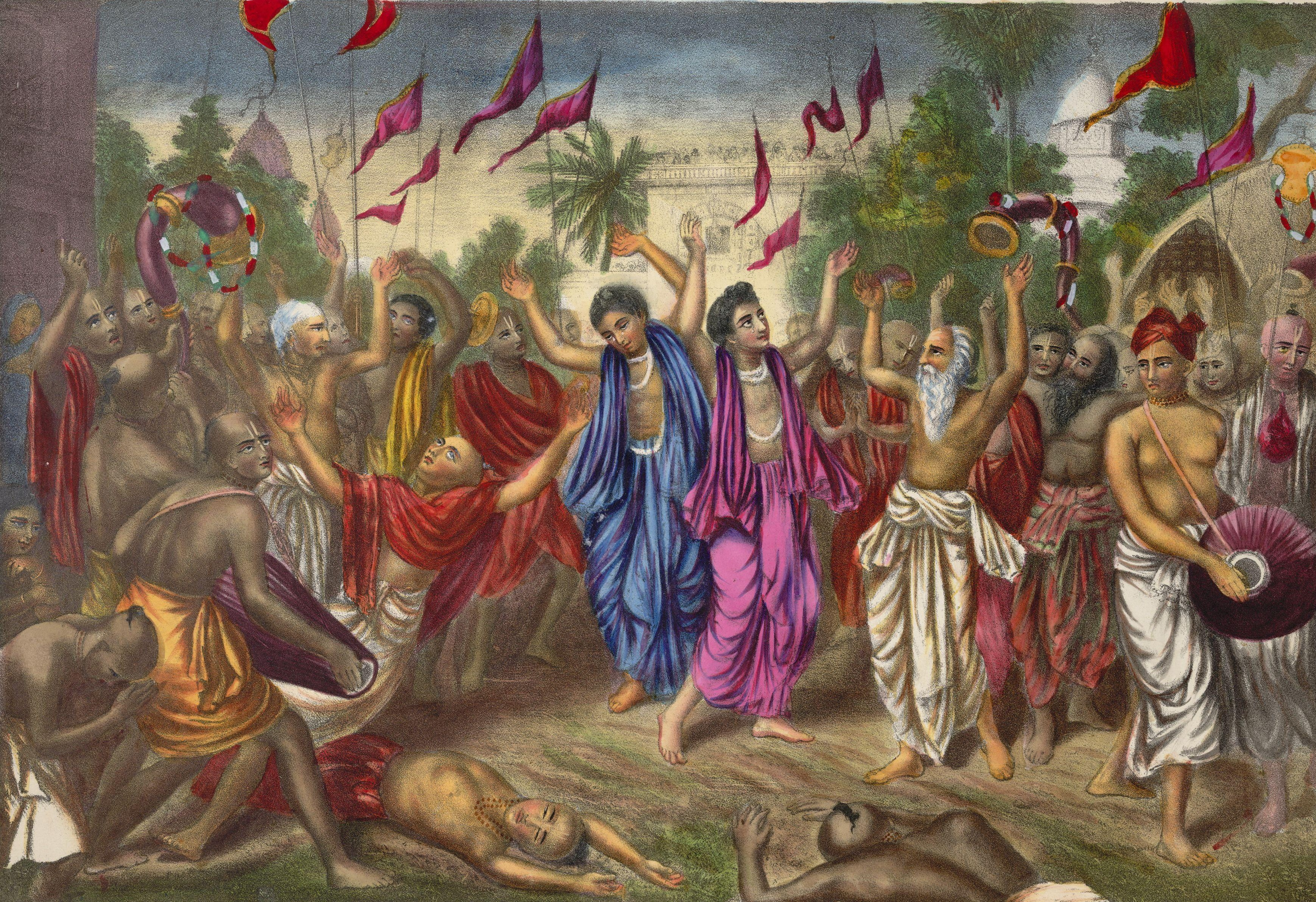
Chaitanya and Nityananda, is shown performing a 'kirtan' (devotional song) in the streets of Nabadwip, Bengal.

Chaitanya and Nityananda's deeds have deep religious and cultural implications in Bengal. They are credited with the revival of Hinduism in Eastern India. Much of Vaishnava literature, regarded as one of the finest literary heritages of medieval Bengal, came from them or their disciples. Chief among Nityananda's disciples were the Twelve Gopalas, who spread the faith throughout the region.

== See also ==
- Chaitanya Mahaprabhu
- Gaudiya Vaishnavism
- Pancha Tattva (Vaishnavism)
- Gopalas
- Ekachakra
