= Hare Krishna (mantra) =

Vaishnava mantra

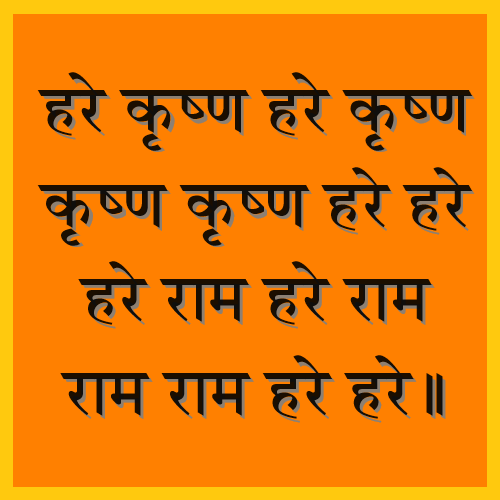
Hare Krishna (Maha Mantra) in the Devanagari (devanāgarī) script.

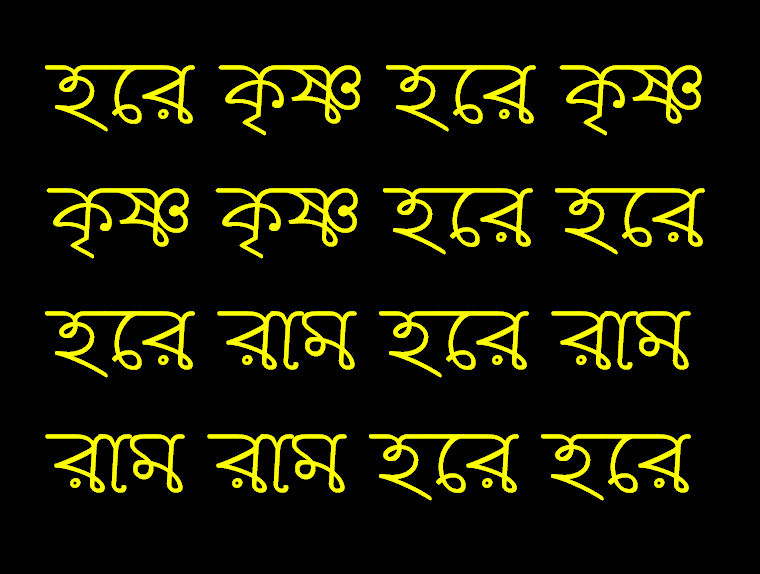
Hare Krishna (Maha Mantra) in the Bengali script

The Hare Krishna (Devanagari: हरे कृष्ण) mantra, also referred to reverentially as the Mahā-mantra (Devanagari: महामन्त्र; lit. 'Great Mantra'), is a 16 words and 32 characters Vaishnava Hindu mantra mentioned in the Kali-Santāraṇa Upaniṣad. In the 15th century, it rose to importance in the Bhakti movement following the teachings of Chaitanya Mahaprabhu. This mantra is composed of three Sanskrit names – "Krishna", "Rama", and "Hare". In this mantra, "Hare" is the vocative form of both "Hara" (Radha) and "Hari" (Krishna).

Since the 1960s, the mantra has been widely known outside India through A. C. Bhaktivedanta Swami Prabhupada and his movement, International Society for Krishna Consciousness (commonly known as the Hare Krishnas or the Hare Krishna movement).

== Mantra ==
The mantra as rendered in the oldest source, the Kali-Santaraṇa Upaniṣad, is as follows:

Hare Rāma Hare Rāma
Rāma Rāma Hare Hare
Hare Kr̥ṣṇa Hare Kr̥ṣṇa
Kr̥ṣṇa Kr̥ṣṇa Hare Hare

— Kali-Santaraṇa Upaniṣad

== History ==
The mantra is first attested in the Kali-Santaraṇa Upaniṣad (Kali Santarana Upanishads), an Upanishad, which is commented on by Raghunandan Bhattacharya in his work Harinamarthah-ratna-dipika. In this Upanishad, Narada is instructed by Brahma (in the translation of K. N. Aiyar):

Hearken to that which all Shrutis (the Vedas) keep secret and hidden, through which one may cross the Saṃsāra (mundane existence) of Kali. He shakes off (the evil effects of) Kali through the mere uttering of the name of Lord Narayana, who is the primeval Purusha.

Narada asks to be told this name of Narayana, and Brahma replies:

Hare Rama Hare Rama, Rama Rama Hare Hare, Hare Krishna Hare Krishna, Krishna Krishna Hare Hare; these sixteen names are destructive of the evil effects of Kali. No better means than this is to be seen in all the Vedas.

Popular tradition believes that Chaitanya Mahaprabhu received this mantra at his initiation (diksha) in Gaya, India; however, biographies of Chaitanya state he received a ten-syllabled mantra.

== Popular culture ==
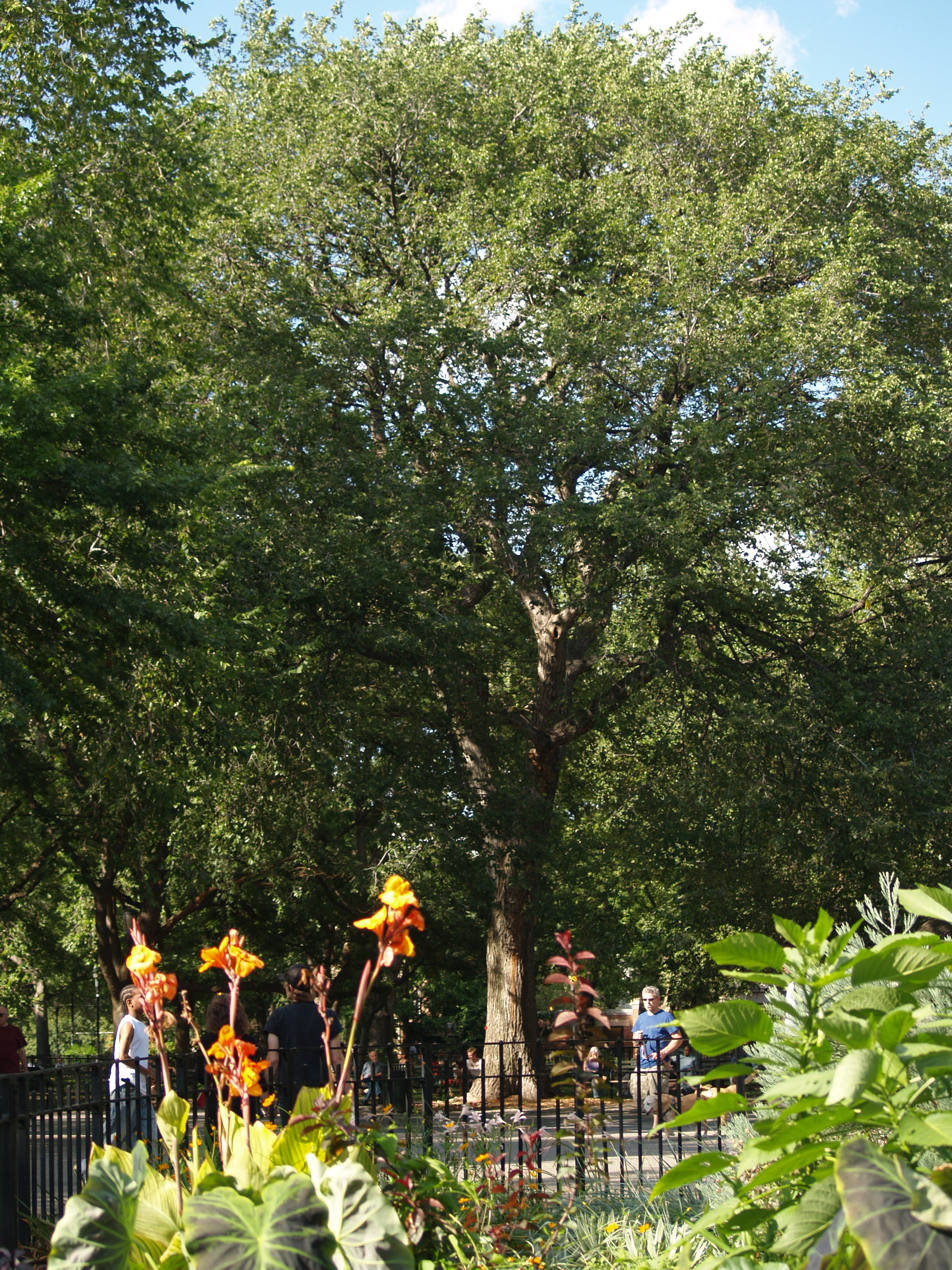
The Hare Krishna Tree, an American elm in Tompkins Square Park, New York City, under which Bhaktivedanta Swami Prabhupada began the first recorded public chanting of the Hare Krishna mantra outside India.

The Hare Krishna mantra appears in a number of famous songs, notably those of George Harrison. His first solo single "My Sweet Lord" topped charts around the world in 1970–71. Harrison put a Hare Krishna sticker on the back of the headstock of Eric Clapton's 1964 Gibson ES-335; the sticker also appears on Gibson's 2005 reproduction of the guitar.

Produced by Harrison, Radha Krishna Temple's recording "Hare Krishna Mantra" was issued as a single on the Beatles' Apple record label in 1969. The single was a commercial success, peaking at number 12 in the UK, and led to the Temple devotees appearing on the popular British music chart television programme Top of the Pops.

The Broadway musical Hair has a song, "Hare Krishna", containing the mantra, along with some additional lyrics.

The Muppet Movie (1979) has a running gag in which characters respond to people being lost by suggesting Hare Krishna. The second time this occurs Kermit the Frog acknowledges that this has become a running gag and it's used throughout the rest of the film.

The mantra also prominently appears in Jesus Loves You's "Bow Down Mister" (1990) and in the Pretenders' "Boots of Chinese Plastic" from their 2008 album, Break Up the Concrete. Stevie Wonder used the devotees chanting Hare Krishna in his song "Pastime Paradise".

Less well-known recordings of the Hare Krishna mantra include versions by the Fugs on their 1968 album Tenderness Junction (featuring poet Allen Ginsberg), by Nina Hagen, in multiple songs by English psychedelic rock band Quintessence (produced by John Barham, a frequent collaborator of George Harrison), the American psychedelic rock band Mad River featured the Hare Krishna mantra on an early version of their song Wind Chimes, recorded in 1967, by Hüsker Dü on their 1984 album Zen Arcade. More recently, electronic duo Boards of Canada incorporated the mantra into the track "Naraka" on their 2026 album Inferno, and American country singer Tyler Childers incorporated the mantra into the track "Tomcat and a Dandy" from the 2025 album Snipe Hunter. Kula Shaker, Boy George, and members of the Rubettes have recorded music tracks about Krishna Consciousness.

In a 2010 experimental study involving both devotees and non-devotees, singing vowels like "ah" and "eh" was found to be more joyful than singing vowels like "oh" and "uh", possibly due to a facial feedback effect.

== See also ==
- Hari Om
- Om Namo Bhagavate Vāsudevāya
- Om Namo Narayanaya
- Svayam Bhagavan

== Sources ==
- Beck, Guy L. (1993). Sonic Theology: Hinduism and Sacred Sound. Studies in Comparative Religion. Columbia, SC: University of South Carolina Press. ISBN 0872498557.
- "English translation of the Kali Santarana Upanishad". Translated by K. Narayanasvami Aiyar. www.celextel.org. Archived from the original on 11 May 2008.
