= Baidya =

Bengali Hindu caste

Bengali Baidya
Regions with significant populations
- West Bengal, Assam, Tripura, Bangladesh

Languages
- Bengali

Religion
- Hinduism

Baidya or Vaidya is a Bengali Hindu community located in the Bengal region of Indian subcontinent. A caste (jāti) of Ayurvedic physicians, the Baidyas have long had pre-eminence in society alongside Brahmins and Kayasthas. In the colonial era, the Bhadraloks were drawn primarily, but not exclusively, from these three upper castes, who continue to maintain a collective hegemony in West Bengal.

== Etymology ==
The terms Baidya means a physician in the Bengali and Sanskrit languages. Bengal is the only place where they formed a caste or rather, a jati.

== Origins ==
The origins of Baidyas remain surrounded by a wide variety of overlapping and sometimes contradictory myths, and are heavily contested. Aside from Upapuranas and two genealogies (Kulajis), premodern Bengali literature does not discuss details of the caste's origins, nor do any old and authentic Smritis. The community claims a descent from the semi-legendary Ambashthas, mostly believed to be of Kshatriya origin in Hindu scriptures, (Note: The Puranas as well as Mahabharata hold them to be Kshatriyas. Smriti and Shastra texts regard them as a mixed caste—of a Brahmin father and a lower caste wife. The Jatakas mention them as Vaishyas. Ambastha Sutta, a Buddhist text regards them as Brahmins. Also, see the next section on Upapuranas.) but such connections are tenuous. (Note: Nripendra K. Dutt, Pascale Haag as well as Poonam Bala concur that the terms were synonymous. Jyotirmoyee Sarma hypothesizes both groups might have followed the same profession and eventually merged into one. Dineshchandra Sircar and Annapurna Chattopadhyay express skepticism on the connection but consider Sarma's hypothesis to be plausible. Projit Bihari Mukharji, however, rejects such an equivalence and notes "Ambastha" had meant different things in different contexts across the history of India; it was always a post-facto label claimed by different groups in their reinvention of themselves.)

It is plausible the Baidyas had some link with Vaidyas of South India; inscriptions of the Sena dynasty mention migrations from Karnat and other places. The Talamanchi plates of Vikramaditya I (c. 660 CE) were drafted by one Vajravarman, described as an "illustrious Vaidya"; besides, three South Indian inscriptions of the Pandyas (c. late 8th century) note the Vaidya-kula (trans. "Vaidya clan" /"Vaidya family") to be Brahmins, famed for expertise in music and Sastras, and one of them was noted to have served in the dual roles of War-General and Prime Minister.

=== Scriptural narratives ===
The Upapuranas played a significant role in the history of Bengal: they propagated and established Brahminic ideals in the hitherto-impure fringes of Aryavarta and accommodated elements of the vernacular culture to gain acceptance among masses. In the process, they became evidence of sociocultural negotiations that transpired in late-medieval Bengal. (Note: Refer Chakrabarti, Kunal (2001). Religious Process: The Puranas and the Making of a Regional Tradition. Oxford University Press. for an overview. The conclusion is worth noting: "The Brahmanization of Bengal ... seems to have engulfed most of the indigenous local cultures by the time the last redactions to the Puranas were made, and succeeded in forging a common religious cultural tradition, flexible enough to accommodate sub-regional variations and indifference to the emerging consensus on the dominant cultural mode among some social groups, and strong enough to take dissent in its stride.")

Brihaddharma Purana (Brh. P.; c. 13th century (Note: Ludo Rocher however notes the text to contain multiple layers (like all other Puranas) making any dating impossible. However, he agrees with R. C. Hazra that a significant part was composed as a response to the Islamic conquest of Bengal.)) was the earliest document to chronicle a hierarchy of castes in Bengal (Note: Older sources on social setup include inscriptions of the Gupta and the Pala periods but Baidyas are not mentioned.) and it became the standard text for popular negotiations of caste status. It mentioned the Baidyas as an occupational caste, equivalent to the Ambasthas, deriving from a well-known (Note: The myth is very popular across a large set of Indian scriptures. It probably has Indo-European origins.) mythical episode where Brahmins had them ordained to be the highest of Shudras and conferred a monopoly to practice Ayurveda. (Note: In the myth whose central event takes place during the reign of Venu, Ambasthas evolved from the forbidden unions of Brahmin fathers with Vaishya mothers, and got classified as Uttama Samkaras (highest of mixed classes). Venu had these mixed-castes further reproduce with other mixed-castes and four pure varnas with bearing the Svarnakaras from Vaishya mothers. After Venu was deposed by the Gods, Prthu was installed as a Vishnu reincarnate and he sought to integrate the Samkaras into the four primordial varnas to restore dharma. Thus, the Ambasthas were brought under Sudras (as were all other castes), and purposed and synonymised to Baidyas (physicians) in light of "existing capacities" and with help from Ashvin. Then, they were made to undergo a second birth as penance for birthing the Svarnakaras - this rebirth is noted to be their identifying characteristic. Pending completion of these rituals, they were branded as among the Satsudras — in total devotion to Brahmins and bearing a lack of material envy — and thus endowed with the right of inviting Srotriya Brahmins and accepting service from lower Sudras; one stanza even notes them to be Saṃkarottama (best of Saṃkaras).) In contrast, the Brahma Vaivarta Purana (Bv. P.) —notable for a very late Bengali recension (c. 14th/15th centuries)— treats the Baidyas as separate to Ambasthas (Note: The origin story goes: Ashvin, a Kshatriya, had raped a Brahmin pilgrim and she, along with the illegitimate son, were driven out by her husband. This son, who was brought up by Ashvin and trained in Ayurveda, went on to become the progenitor of Baidyas.) but notes both to be Satsudras.

According to Ryosuke Furui, the Varnasamkara myth and the subsequent ordaining of Samkaras in Brh. P. reflected and reinforced the existing social hierarchy of ancient Bengal — that is, even in pre-Brahminized Bengal, the Baidyas had an eminent position and practiced medicine — while allowing the Brahmin authors to conform an alien society to orthodoxic standards, and establish themselves at the top. (Note: Furui senses the express prohibitions on Ambastha/Baidyas to read the Puranas despite granting them the Ayurveda as indicative of a fear of encroachment upon Brahmin intellectual domain and a tacit acknowledgement of groups trained in alternate forms of knowledge; the deeming of Ambastha/Baidyas as Samkarottama were concessional transactions where Brahmins entered into co operational agreements with other groups but commanded nominal authority.) (Note: In any case, whether the Brhaddharma Purana succeeded in materializing and sustaining the Brahminical visions of Bengali society is doubtful; the medieval law commentary Dāyabhāga shares few things in common with Bṛhaddharma Purana.) According to Sircar, the Baidya community mentioned in the Bv. P. was a group of degraded Brahmins called Vaidya or Pandita, who resided in the Ganjam district of Odisha and may have served as a link between the Vaidyas of South India and the Baidyas of Bengal.

=== Kulajis ===
Kulajis — a form of literature endemic to Bengal — were essentially immutable genealogical registers but actually, texts in flux, reflecting the needs and anxieties of contemporary society; they primarily served to establish social hierarchy vis à vis others. Of the two extant pre-modern Baidya genealogies, Chandraprabha (CP; c. late 17th century) constructs a descent from the semi-legendary Ambasthas whereas the slightly older Sadvaidyakulapnjika (SV) did not. (Note: Sadvaidyakulapnjika does not invoke any such connection. Chandraprabha mentions Bharatamallika's father to be a Vaidya and an Ambastha; it also quotes from Hindu scriptures to prove why Ambasthas and Baidyas are equable. Annapurna Chattopadhyaya noted the "genuineness and historical bearing" of these passages to be "questionable". R. C. Majumdar, D. C. Ganguly, and R. C. Hazra reiterate concerns of genuineness but note that Bharatamallika must have reflected contemporary views.) Further, both of them hold Adi Sura and Ballāla Sena to be among their ancestors; this is agreed upon by some Brahmin kulanjis but rejected by Kayastha ones. (Note: The particulars of appropriation vary — CP held that the Baidyas gained Kulin status for their sadachara (good conduct) in due course of time while SV reiterated the popular tradition of Ballāla Sena conferring Kulin status.)

== History ==
=== Gupta Bengal (c. 400 C.E. - 550 C.E.) ===
Sedentary agrarian societies had formed in western regions of Bengal by c. 1000 BCE. The growth of states were roughly simultaneous with the rise of the Gupta Empire and by then, cultural contacts with North India were gradually flourishing. (Note: The region had remained outside the influences of Brahminism for long, being treated as the "land of impure" as late as c. 200 B.C.E.) Written records predating the Guptas do not survive.

Copper Plate Inscriptions from the Gupta Era point to a complex society with different professional classes having little socioeconomic homogeneity. Many of these classes had their own hierarchies corresponding to differential geospatial levels or economic conditions but there exists no evidence of inter-class hierarchy; rather, there were frequent collaborations at the local levels in bureaucratic affairs. It does not appear that varna played any role in the society — the Brahmins were the only group to be referred to by their caste-identity and were revered but still classed as one among the peasant landholder class.

One Gunaighar Inscription, dated to Vainyagupta (507 C.E.), demarcated agricultural tracts that were to be collectively owned by Baidyas. The reference was, in all likelihood, to the profession of physicians who probably drew people from various varnas including Brahmins.

=== Medieval Bengal (c. 600 C.E. - c. 1400 C.E.) ===
With the rise of sovereign kingships centered around Vanga, Radha, and Pundravardhana, the relatively well-off sections among the landholder class gained eminence and split into several sub-classes depending on economic power. Inscriptions referred to people from these classes alongside the villages they owned and above other professional classes — thus, economic affluence, rather than varna, appears to have been the operating norm in these societies. North-eastern Bengal which saw aggressive encroachment upon tribal tracts via royal settlement of Brahmins witnessed a less egalitarian society; yet, notwithstanding rulers claiming to a Brahmin pedigree etc, the social groups in inscriptions did not have anything to do with varna.

With increasing urbanization in Pala territories, stratification became ingrained into the social structure and Brahmins —probably with state patronage— ascended to the top, overshadowing the landed magnates. Pala grants frequently enlist a detailed social hierarchy from the Brahmins to the Chandalas, encompassing many professional classes. In contrast, largely-agrarian societies in the east, ruled by the Chandras, exhibited no such radical developments though rudimentary notions of ranks were under development. The Paschimbhag copperplate inscription of Sri Chandra allotted the Baidyas with the largest share of land per se —even exceeding the Brahmins— pointing to the yet-insignificant roles played by varna.

Beginning the 11th century, kinship based organization was increasingly evident across all classes — sects of Brahmins claimed greater authority deriving from the illustriousness of their ancestors and networked among themselves, literate classes entered into practicing endogamy etc. Inscriptions increasingly point to the hereditary nature of a range of professions from merchants to engravers to scribes. In the words of Furui, proto-jatis were forming across these spans which would be legitimized into a Brahminic social order by the Upapuranas etc. The Bhatera Copper Plates (Note: See Mitra, Rajendralal (August 1880). "Copper-Plate Inscriptions from Sylhet". Proceedings of the Asiatic Society of Bengal. LIV: 141–151. for more details. No information exists about this dynasty (?) except what can be gleaned from these two plates; they were probably a lineage of the Devas.) mention the aksapaṭalika of King Isandeva (c. 1050) to be of Baidya lineage, on whose advice a parcel of land was granted to the family of a dead prince. (Note: The Gaya Narasimha Temple Inscription was composed by one "Vaidya Bajrapani" during the reign of Nayapala, as was the Gaya Akshaybata Temple Inscription by "Vaidya Dharmapani" during the reign of Vigrahapala III. It is not wise to speculate on whether they were (B)Vaidyas — the Nalanda Stone Pillar inscription of Rajyapala explicitly notes one Vaidyanatha to be from the Vanik-kula (mercantile community).) Kumkum Chatterjee feels that the Baidyas had probably crystallized into a jati long before the Sultanate rule, sometime around these times. (Note: However, R. C. Majumdar notes a karana family to have served as the royal physicians in 11th and 12th century Bengal.)

=== Sultanate and Mughal Bengal ===
In Sultanate, Mughal, and Nawabi Bengal, Baidyas often branched out into fields other than medicine and comprised a significant percentage of the elites. They were reputed for their proficiency in Sanskrit, which they needed to read treatises of medicine. By the end of sixteenth century, Baidyas were occupying a position of preeminence in the Bengali social hierarchy alongside Brahmins and Kayasthas; marriages between Baidyas and Kayasthas were commonplace.

Around the late fifteenth century, Baidyas became intricately associated with the Caitanya Cult alongside Brahmins. Murari Gupta, a childhood friend of Caitanya, was a famed physician of Navadwip and went on to compose Krsna Caitanya Caritamrta, his oldest extant biography in Sanskrit. Narahari Sarkara, another Baidya devotees, composed Krsna Bhajanamrta, a theological commentary. Sivananda Sena, an immensely wealthy Baidya, organize the annual trip of Caitanya devotees to Puri, and his son wrote several devotional Sanskrit works. As the Caitanya cult shunned doctrines of equality after his death, the associated Baidyas began enjoying a quasi-Brahminic status as Gaudiya Vasihnava gurus. (Note: It must be borne in mind, however, the Baidya jati was not a homogeneous unit. The community was divided into numerous endogamous samajes (societies) that exhibited strict conformity in rituals and social behaviour. There were Shaivite Baidya samajes, with a marked antipathy for the Vaishnava cult. Often, these samajes were further divided into sthans (places) that had variable degree of autonomy.)

Multiple Baidya authors partook in the Mangalkavya tradition, the foremost being Bijaya Gupta (late 15th c.). Besides, two Chandi Mangalkavyas were penned by Jaynnarayana Sen (c. 1750) and Muktarama Sen (1774), two Manasa Mangalkavyas by Sasthibara Datta (late 17th c.) and one by Dbarik Das. Bharatamallika (fl. 1650), a physician and an instructor of a tol, wrote numerous commentaries on Sanskrit texts like Amarakosha, and produced miscellaneous works on grammar and lexicography.

==== Caste status and contestations ====
The Vallal Charita of Ānanda Bhaṭṭa (Note: The text reiterates a different version of the Brh. P. myth, where Vaidyas are held to be the son of an Ambastha father and a Vaisya mother. Ambastha was born of a Maula father and a Vaisya mother. Maula was created of a Brahmin father and a Kshatriya mother.) classed the Baidyas among Satsudras, of whom Kayasthas were held to be the highest. The Chandimangal of Mukundaram Chakrabarti (c. mid 16th century CE) placed the Baidyas below Vaisyas but above Kayasthas, again indicating a Sudra status. (Note: Kunal Chakrabarti and Sudipta Kuvairaj note Ch. M. to demonstrate a confluence of Brahminical and local folk traditions; their views of caste society differed from traditional Brahmanic literature.) Works by Raghunandana (c. mid 16th century) also hold Baidyas to be Sudras. In 1653 C.E., Ramakanta Das wrote the oldest available Baidya kulanji — Sadvaidyakulapnjika. A few years later, Bharatamallika would write Chandraprabha (1675 C.E.), and Ratnaprabha, a summary of the former text. (Note: Both Kavikantahara and Bharatamallika mentioned of several older genealogies, which are now-lost or (unlikely) yet to be retrieved.) Bharata claimed a mixed-caste/Vaishya status for the Baidyas whereas Das skipped such discussions. In the Caitanya Caritāmṛta of Baidya Krishnadasa Kaviraja, one Candrasekhara is variably referred to as a Baidya and a Sudra. (Note: This Candrasekhara was based in Banaras and might have been the court poet of Rao Surjan Singh.)

=== Colonial Bengal ===
During the eighteenth, nineteenth, and twentieth centuries, acrimonious debates about the caste status of Baidyas proliferated. Around 1750, Raja Rajballabh wished to have Brahmins officiate at his rituals; he sought Vaishya status and claimed a right of wearing sacred thread for the Baidyas of his own samaj. (Note: Sena is held to have divided the Baidyas into numerous sub-castes, depending on their place of residence, leading to samaj-es.) On facing opposition from other Baidya zamindars, who thought this to be an attempt at gaining trans-samaj acceptance as a Baidya leader, and Brahmin scholars of Vikrampur, who resented the loss of monopoly, Rajballabh invited 131 Brahmins from Benaras, Kanauj, Navadwip, and other regions with expertise in Nyaya Shastra. All of them adjudicated in his favour, with ceremonial costs running to five lakhs.

Soon, Baidyas sought for equality with the Brahmins and claimed themselves to be "Gauna (secondary) Brahmins", leveraging the recently conferred right to upanayana. Further, Calcutta Sanskrit College barred Shudras from admission, initially allowing only Brahmins and Baidyas to enrol until Ishwar Chandra Vidyasagar introduced admission for Kayasthas. At the same time, they invested efforts to prevent lower rank caste from infiltrating into their ranks and emphasize on their social purity; (Note: Mukharji notes movements to gain social mobility actively sought to safeguard their earned dominance by making sure lower-ranked castes remained as such. Vaidyas were no exception.) in the smallpox epidemic of the 1840s in Dhaka, Baidyas would refuse to inoculate the masses and relegate such menial tasks to lower-ranked barbers and garland makers. Beginning in 1822, Brahmin and Baidya scholars produced a series of polemical pamphlets against one another and in 1831, the Baidya Samaj (Baidya Society) was formed by Khudiram Bisharad, a teacher at the Native Medical Institution, to defend class interests. Gangadhar Ray, a member of this society, produced voluminous literature to put forward partisan claims on Baidyas descending from Brahmins. Binodlal Sen later published Bharatamallika's genealogies in print. A rivalry with the Kayasthas, who would be considered to be inferior thenceforth, became an integral part of this discourse; (Note: Kayasthas rejected the mobility claims of Baidyas to the extent of bribing Brahmins and instead chose to assert themselves as Kshatriyas.) matrimonial alliances were discouraged, fomenting the rise of a rigid, endogamous caste group. (Note: However, Baidyas continued to marry Kayasthas in East Bengal leading to a diminution in status.)

In 1893, Jnanendramohan Sengupta wrote Baidyajatir Baisista in an attempt to prove the Ambasthas had scriptural sanction of being ordained into sannyasa, like Brahmins; Sengupta remained a prolific author for the Baidya cause throughout the first quarter of the twentieth century. In 1901, colonial ethnographer Herbert Hope Risley noted the Baidyas to be above Sudras but below Brahmins. Baidya social historians like Umesh Chandra Gupta and Dinesh Chandra Sen supported Risley's observation of non-Shudra status with measured skepticism and went on to produce illustrious histories of the community, deriving from kulanjis. (Note: These efforts met with much resistance from positivist historians. Jadunath Sarkar, R. C. Majumdar, and other historians rejected the idea kulanjis were acceptable as evidences of history. Gupta also rebuked the Kayasthas for fabricating evidence to "malign" the Vaidyas as a low caste.) In the early twentieth century, Gananath Sen, the first dean of the Faculty of Ayurveda at Banaras Hindu University, opened a "Baidya Brahman Samiti" in Calcutta; now, the Baidyas were not merely equal to Brahmins but identical. It was also suggested all Baidyas change their surnames to Sharma, a Brahmin patronymic. In 1915 and 1916, Kuladakinkara Ray published Vaidyakulapanjika to advocate that Baidyas were not just the same as Brahmins but the highest of them. (Note: The text proposed the word Vaidya was constructed either from Veda or Vidya, redefined the word Ambastha as meaning the father (of patients incl. Brahmins), quoted from the Dharmaśāstra cannon about caste groups exhibiting social mobility as a result of virtuous deeds, (Note: It was highlighted Baidyas taught the Vedas unlike Brahmins, who were "apparently" only allowed to only recite them. Also, Baidyas exhibited sacrificatory values in the preparation of pakayajna and utterance of mantras during the making of a medical remedy.) and highlighted from Veda and Smritis about products of mixed marriages being entitled to carry their paternal caste.) In 1922, Basantakumar Sen wrote Baidya Jatir Itihas on the same themes. Pascale Haag notes these efforts to gain mobility would not have partly succeeded without acceptance by Brahmin society.

These attempts at attaining mobility were heavily enmeshed with the modernization of Ayurveda, that transpired across the nineneeth century. Binodlal Sen had declared the genealogical works to be free for anyone who purchased medications above a certain value and Baidya medicine distributors were frequently found to sell revisionist caste histories. Says Mukharji, that elements of colonial modernity—Western notions of physiology and medical instruments—were "braided" with Ayurveda to fashion Baidyas as the modern Brahmins. Notwithstanding these contestations of scriptural rank, the material dominance of Baidyas continued unabated into colonial rule when they proactively took to Western forms of education and held a disproportionate share of government jobs, elite professions, and landholding. (Note: According to David L. Curley, Baidyas were "serving in local revenue administrations, managing rent and revenue collections for zamindars, obtaining or providing short-term agrarian and mercantile credit, engaging in trade as agents or partners of the English and French East India Companies and acquiring zamindari estates".) Male as well as female literacy rate of Baidyas were remarkably higher than in the case of all other castes of Bengal, as recorded in the 1881 census—which was the first to record caste-wise literacy data—and ever since. Baidya women, specifically, had two and three times the literacy( in vernacular and English respectively) of Bengal's overall male population as per the 1931 census.

Baidyas were unquestionably established as among the "upper castes" by the mid-nineteenth century; they would go on to comprise the Bhadralok Samaj—the highest "secular rank" in contemporary Bengal—along with Brahmins and Kayasthas, and serve as the eyes and ears of the British Government. (Note: Jyotirmoyee Sarma notes Baidyas already had (bhadralok) but strove (to the fascination of external observers) for the highest of "ceremonial/scriptural rank" (brahmin).) The Bhadraloks were instrumental in demanding democratic reforms during the early twentieth century; a majority of "revolutionary terrorists" from Bengal who partook in the Indian independence movement came from this class.

=== Modern Bengal ===
In modern Bengal, Baidyas' place in caste-hierarchy follows Brahmins — they wear the sacred thread, and have access to scriptures, but cannot conduct priestly services. Their ritual rank — whether Sudras or not — is debated (Note: In 1960, Chattopdhyay noted Baidyas were still treated as Sudras on all orthodox religious occasions. However, Sarma in 1980 postulated that the rank of Baidyas in ritual occasions was established to be higher than that of the Sudra.) and claims to Brahmin status persist. However, their socioeconomic status rivals that of Brahmins. As of 1960, inter-marriages between the Brahmins, Baidyas and Kayasthas were common and increasing.

Baidyas wield considerable socio-economic power in contemporary Bengal as part of Bhadraloks; though in absence of rigorous data, the precise extent is difficult to determine. Parimal Ghosh notes this Bhadralok hegemony to have effectively disenfranchised the rest of Bengal from staking a claim to social capital.

== Notable people ==
- Chittaranjan Das, Indian revolutionary and lawyer, popularly known as Deshbandhu
- Dinesh Chandra Sen, Bengali writer, educationist
- Hiralal Sen, one of India's first film makers
- Jatindra Mohan Sengupta, Indian revolutionary
- Jibanananda Das, poet, writer and novelist
- Keshub Chandra Sen, philosopher, social reformer
- Madhusudan Gupta, India's first human dissector
- Mrinal Sen, Dadasaheb Phalke winner Indian film director
- Nabinchandra Sen, poet
- Prafulla Chandra Sen, 3rd CM of West Bengal
- Pritilata Waddedar, revolutionary nationalist
- Ramkamal Sen, former principal of Calcutta Sanskrit College
- Ramprasad Sen, Hindu Shakta poet and saint
- R. C. Majumdar, historian
- Siddhartha Shankar Ray, 5th Chief Minister of West Bengal
- Suchitra Sen, Bengali actress
- Surya Sen, Indian revolutionary, popularly known as Master Da
- Surendranath Dasgupta, Indian scholar of Sanskrit and Indian philosophy
