= Sivananda Sena =

Bengali poet and disciple of Chaitanya Mahaprabhu (16th century)

Sivananda Sena (Sen)
- Native name: শিবানন্দ সেন
- Born: Kumarahatta (now Halisahar, West Bengal)
- Died: Nilachala, Odisha
- Occupation: Poet, writer, saint
- Language: Bengali
- Period: 16th-century
- Genre: Gaudiya Vaishnavism philosophy

Sivananda Sena (Bengali: শিবানন্দ সেন) was a poet and prominent disciple of the 15th-century Indian Hindu mystic and saint from Bengal, Chaitanya Mahaprabhu.

== Life ==
Sivananda Sena was born into a Baidya family in Kumarahatta (now Halisahar, West Bengal). (Note: Sivananda Sena's birthplace is disputed. According to Tony K. Stewart, Sena hailed from Nabadwip; whereas Bardwell L. Smith states that his origins lie in Kulingram.) He was, by all accounts, extremely wealthy, though the source of his wealth is unclear. According to Smith, it is plausible that Sena was appointed to a distinguished position by the royal authority, perhaps as a revenue collector at Kanchrapara, the village where he later settled. He was highly influential and respected in his town, and likely had several connections.

Sena first met Chaitanya in Puri, after the latter had renounced worldly affairs. Influenced by Chaitanya, he joined his religious movement, Gaudiya Vaishnavism, and soon became one of Chaitanya's most devoted followers. The author Krishnadasa Kaviraja, in the hagiography Chaitanya Charitamrita, mentions Sena as an intimate disciple of Chaitanya, and the only one to have witnessed his three distinct manifestations; his observable form, his possession of a devotee, and his presence in the mind of his followers.

As a close associate of Chaitanya, Sena used his wealth to support all of his followers. He organized the annual trip of the devotees to Puri to see Chaitanya and the Ratha Yatra festival, and ensured their protection. He managed the pilgrims' comforts and needs, paid for their food, transportation and lodging, and handled the payment of road tolls. According to his son, Kavi Karnapura, Sena cared for all devotees, including the outcastes, often at his own expense.

Sena was also a noted poet and writer. He composed several songs and verses in praise of Chaitanya.

He also constructed a temple at Kanchrapara, wherein he installed deities of Gaura and Gopal.

Sena had three sons; Chaitanyadasa, Ramadasa and Paramananda Sena. Paramananda Sena, popularly known as Kavi Karnapura, would later become an eminent poet and writer. He authored a formal poem, the Chaitanya Charanamrita, and a drama, the Chaitanya Chandrodaya, on the life of Chaitanya.

== Legend ==
In the Chaitanya Charitamrita, Krishnadasa Kaviraja alludes to an apocryphal story about Sivananda Sena, highlighting his care for animals. The text states that on one of his annual trips to Puri, Sena carried a dog with him. He paid additional money to a boatman for the same, who had initially declined to adhere to his request. Sena had strictly instructed the devotees to regularly feed the dog. One day, the devotees forgot to feed the dog, causing the dog to run away. This caused immense pain to Sena, and he refused to eat. Later, when the devotees reached the Jagannath Temple at Puri, they were astonished to find the dog at the feet of Chaitanya Mahaprabhu. This was when Sena realized that the dog had attained liberation, or moksha.

== See also ==
- Chaitanya Mahaprabhu
- Kavi Karnapura
- Krishnadasa Kaviraja
- Gaudiya Vaishnavism
