= Narahari Sarkar =

Indian poet, lyrist and Vaishnava Bhakti saint

- নরহরি সরকার
- Born: later phase of 15th century Srikhanda, Bardhaman
- Died: later phase of 16th century
- Occupations: Poet, Saint
- Writing career
- Language: Bengali, Sanskrit
- Genre: Gaudiya Vaisnava Philosophy
- Notable works: Bhakti-candrika-patala, Bhaktamrtastaka, Krsna Bhajanamrta, etc.

Narahari Sarkar was a 16th-century Bengali poet, lyrist, a Vaishnava Bhakti saint, and one of the associates and disciples of Chaitanya Mahaprabhu. He is best known for his Sanskrit works, Bhakti-candrika-patala, Bhaktamrtastaka, Krsna Bhajanamrta, etc. He was the preacher of the doctrine of "Gaurangarvada". (Note: In the doctrine of 'Gaurangarvada' Chaitanya is considered as the beloved or 'nagara' and his adorers as the women in love or 'nagaris')

== Life and works ==
Narahari Sarkar was born into a Hindu Baidya family in Bengal. He was born on Saka 1400 (=1478 / 1481 CE) at Srikhanda in the Bardhaman district of Bengal. His father was Narayanadeva Sarkar, and his elder brother Mukunda was a physician to the Pathan King at Gour. Narahari also served as court physician of the Sultan of Gour for some time. Narahari, Mukunda and his nephew Raghunanda (son of Mukunda), were associates of Chaitanya Mahaprabhu.

Narahari initially wrote pada (verses) on Krishna but, after the influence of Chaitanya, he started composing verses dedicated to the latter. He propounded a Chaitanya–centric Vaishnava faith, called as 'Gaurangarvad'. (Note: In the post-Chaitanya movement of Bengal, two distinct trends were developed simultaneously at Navadvipa and Vrindabana. The Navadvipa followers were reflected in the lyrical writings of Narahari Sarkar.) (Note: Narahari Chakravarti was a later 18th century Bhakti poet. He is different from Narahari Sarkar.) According to Sen, Narahari was perhaps the first poet to compose verses about the life of Chaitanya. He used simple and direct language in composing verses. He was a recognised Sanskrit scholar. He wrote several books, including Bhakti-chandrika-patala, Krishna-bhajanamrita, (Note: Krishnabhajanamrita is a collection of devotional verses that are dedicated to Krishna.) Bhaktamrtastaka, Saparsad-Gourangavandana, etc. He wrote only stray lyrics, incorporating the thoughts of 'Nagarabhava' believes. (Note: Followers of 'Nagarabha' thought portrayed Caitanaya as the lover of Vrindaban.)

Lochana Dasa, composer of Chaitanya Mangala, was a disciple of Narahari Sarkar. (Note: Lochan Dasa also propounded the doctrine of 'Gourangavada') (Note: According to Smith, though Narahari was a Baidya, he had many Brahmins among his disciples.) He died in 1582 CE.
