= Shikshashtakam =

16th-century Gaudiya Vaishnava Hindu prayer

The Shikshashtakam (IAST: Śikṣāṣṭakam) is a 16th-century Gaudiya Vaishnava Hindu prayer of eight verses composed in the Sanskrit language. They are the only verses left personally written by Chaitanya Mahaprabhu (1486 – 1534) with the majority of his philosophy being codified by his primary disciples, known as the Six Goswamis of Vrindavan. The Shikshashtakam is quoted within the Chaitanya Charitamrita, Krishnadasa Kaviraja Goswami's biography of Chaitanya Mahaprabhu, written in Bengali. The name of the prayer comes from the Sanskrit words Śikṣā, meaning 'instruction', and aṣṭaka, meaning 'consisting of eight parts', i.e., stanzas. The teachings contained within the eight verses are believed to contain the essence of all teachings on Bhakti yoga within the Gaudiya tradition.

== Text ==
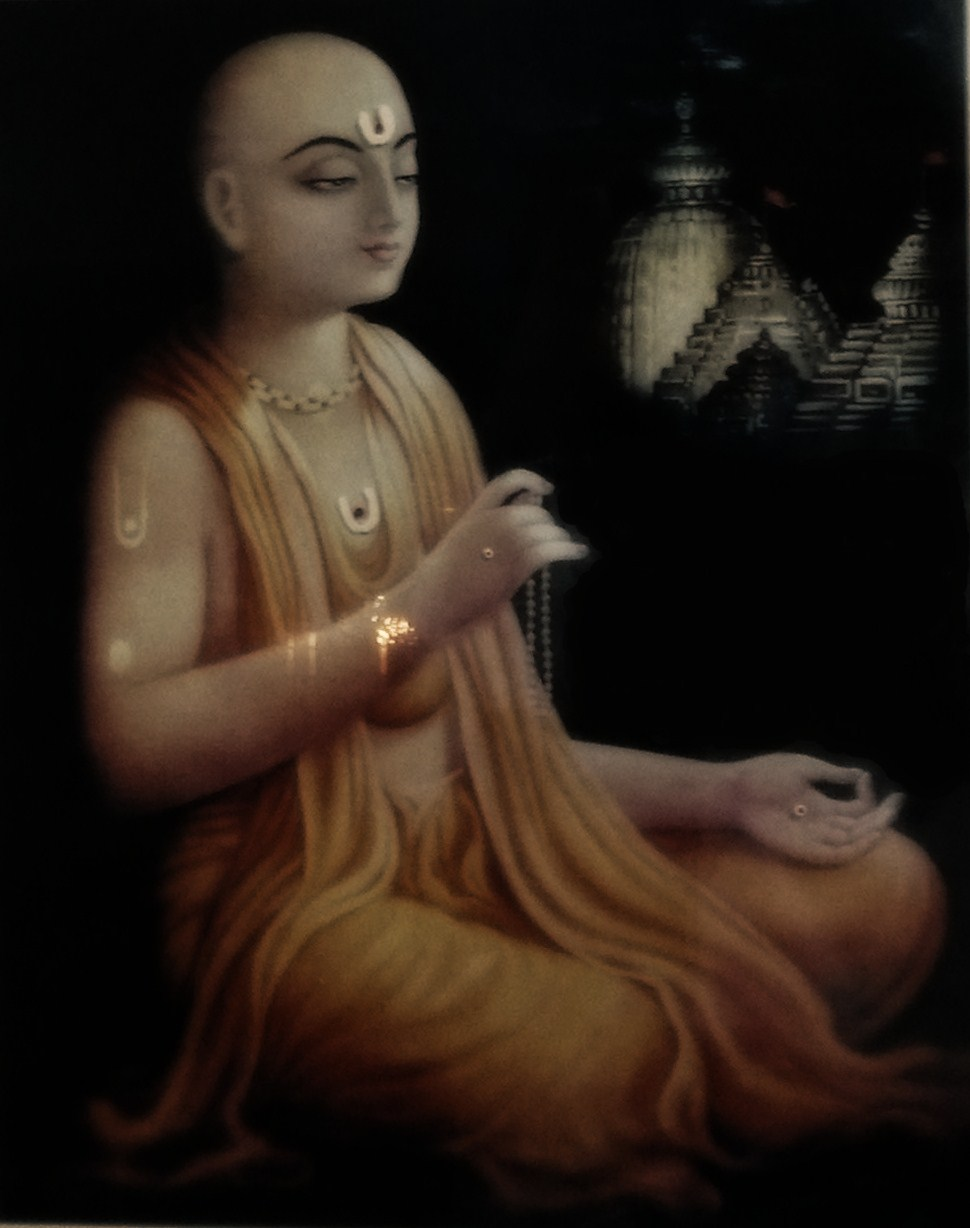
Chaitanya Mahaprabhu

The first eight verses of the following are the complete text of the Shikshashtakam, as written in Sanskrit by Sri Chaitanya Mahaprabhu. They are found in Krishnadasa Kaviraja's Sri Chaitanya Charitamrita (Antya-līlā, chapter 20, verses 12, 16, 21, 29, 32, 36, 39 and 47). The final verse is a Bengali quotation from Sri Chaitanya Charitamrita, Antya-līlā 20.65 - it is not part of the actual Shikshashtakam, but is often appended to the end when it is recited, describing the result of reciting the Shikshashtakam faithfully.

=== Verse 1 ===
ceto-darpaṇa-mārjanaṁ bhava-mahā-dāvāgni-nirvāpaṇaṁ

śreyaḥ-kairava-candrikā-vitaraṇaṁ vidyā-vadhū-jīvanam

ānandāmbudhi-vardhanaḿ prati-padaṁ pūrṇāmṛtāsvādanaṁ

sarvātma-snapanaṁ paraṁ vijayate śrī-kṛṣṇa-saṅkīrtanam

चेतो-दर्पण-मार्जनं भव-महा-दावाग्नि-निर्वापणं

श्रेयः-कैरव-चन्द्रिका-वितरणं विद्या-वधू-जीवनम्

आनन्दाम्बुधि-वर्धनं प्रति-पदं पूर्णामृतास्वादनं

सर्वात्म-स्नपनं परं विजयते श्री-कृष्ण-सङ्कीर्तनम्

==== Translation ====
Literal:

Glory to the Shri Krishna sankirtana (congregational chanting of the Lord's holy names), which cleanses the heart of all the dust accumulated for years and extinguishes the fire of conditional life, of repeated birth and death. That sankirtana movement is the prime benediction for humanity at large because it spreads the rays of the benediction moon. It is the life of all transcendental knowledge. It increases the ocean of transcendental bliss, and it enables us to fully taste the nectar for which we are always anxious.

=== Verse 2 ===
nāmnām akāri bahudhā nija-sarva-śaktis

tatrārpitā niyamitaḥ smaraṇe na kālaḥ

etādṛśī tava kṛpā bhagavan mamāpi

durdaivam īdṛśam ihājani nānurāgaḥ

नाम्नामकारि बहुधा निज-सर्व-शक्तिस्

तत्रार्पिता नियमितः स्मरणे न कालः

एतादृशी तव कृपा भगवन्ममापि

दुर्दैवमीदृशमिहाजनि नानुरागः ॥२॥

==== Translation ====
Literal: In your (divine) names you manifested various kinds of full potencies (shaktis) therein bestowed, with no rules according to time for remembering them. O Lord, you are so merciful, but it is my misfortune here that I have no anuraga (interest) in those names.

=== Verse 3 ===
tṛṇād api sunīcena

taror api sahiṣṇunā

amāninā mānadena

kīrtanīyaḥ sadā hariḥ

तृणादऽपि सुनीचेन

तरोरऽपि सहिष्णुना

अमानिना मानदेन

कीर्तनीयः सदा हरिः ॥३॥

==== Translation ====
Literal:

One should chant the holy name of the Lord in a humble state of mind, feeling oneself lower than the straw in the street. One should be more tolerant than a tree, devoid of all sense of false prestige, and ready to offer all respect to others. In such a state of mind, one can chant the holy name of the Lord constantly.

=== Verse 4 ===
na dhanaḿ na janaḿ na sundarīḿ

kavitāḿ vā jagadīśa kāmaye

mama janmani janmanīśvare

bhavatād bhaktir ahaitukī tvayi

न धनं न जनं न सुन्दरीं

कवितां वा जगदीश कामये

मम जन्मनि जन्मनीश्वरे

भवताद् भक्तिर् अहैतुकी त्वयि ॥४॥

==== Translation ====
Literal:

No wealth, no followers, no beauty or poetic praise desire I; in birth after birth let there be devotion unmotived unto thee o ishvara.

Alternatively:

O Lord of the Universe, I do not desire wealth, followers, beautiful women, nor the flowery language of the vedas; let me have only causeless devotion to you, birth after birth.

=== Verse 5 ===
ayi nanda-tanūja kińkaraḿ

patitaḿ māḿ viṣame bhavāmbudhau

kṛpayā tava pāda-pańkaja-

sthita-dhūlī-sadṛśaḿ vicintaya

अयि नन्द-तनुज किङ्करं

पतितं मां विषमे भवाम्बुधौ

कृपया तव पाद-पङ्कज-

स्थित-धूली-सदृशं विचिन्तय ॥५॥

==== Translation ====
Literal:

O son of Nanda (Krishna), I am Your eternal servant, yet somehow I have fallen into the ocean of birth and death. Please consider me as a particle of dust at Your lotus feet.

=== Verse 6 ===
nayanaṁ galadaśrudhārayā vadanaṁ gadagadaruddhayā girā. pulakairnicitaṁ vapuḥ kadā tava nāma-grahaṇē bhaviṣyati

नयनं गलदश्रुधारया वदनं गदगदरुद्धया गिरा। पुलकैर्निचितं वपुः कदा तव नाम-ग्रहणे भविष्यति॥६॥

==== Translation ====
Literal:

O Lord, when will my eyes be filled with tears of love flowing incessantly as I chant Your holy names? When will my voice choke up, and when will the hairs of my body stand on end at the recitation of Your name?

=== Verse 7 ===
yugāyitaḿ nimeṣeṇa

cakṣuṣā prāvṛṣāyitam

śūnyāyitaḿ jagat sarvaḿ

govinda-viraheṇa me

युगायितं निमेषेण

चक्षुषा प्रावृषायितम्

शून्यायितं जगत्सर्वं

गोविन्द-विरहेण मे ॥७॥

==== Translation ====
Literal:

A moment seems like an eternity, tears flow from my eyes like torrents of rain, and the whole world feels empty in Your absence, O Govinda (Krishna).

=== Verse 8 ===
āśliṣya vā pāda-ratāḿ pinaṣṭu mām

adarśanān marma-hatāḿ karotu vā

yathā tathā vā vidadhātu lampaṭo

mat-prāṇa-nāthas tu sa eva nāparaḥ

आश्लिष्य वा पाद-रतां पिनष्टु माम्

अदर्शनान्मर्म-हताम् करोतु वा

यथा तथा वा विदधातु लम्पटो

मत्प्राण-नाथस्तु स एव नापरः ॥८॥

==== Translation ====
Literal:

Let Krishna tightly embrace this maidservant who has fallen at His feet, or let Him trample me or break my heart by not appearing before me. He is a debauchee after all and can do whatever He likes, but He is still none other than the worshipable Lord of my heart.

== Extra verse ==
This verse follows the 8 verses written by Chaitanya in Śrī Caitanya-caritāmṛta:

prabhura ‘śikṣāṣṭaka’-śloka yei paḍe, śune kṛṣṇe prema-bhakti tāra bāḍe dine-dine

=== Translation ===
If anyone recites or hears these eight verses of instruction by Śrī Caitanya Mahāprabhu, their ecstatic love and devotion (prema-bhakti) for Kṛṣṇa increases day by day.

== See also ==
- Hare Krishna
- Vrindavan
- Vaishnavism
- Svayam Bhagavan
- Radha Krishna
- Chaitanya Bhagavata
