= Radharaman Dutta =

Bengali musician and poet (1834-1915)

- রাধারমণ দত্ত
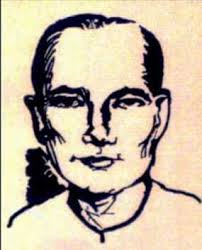
- Radharaman Dutta
- Born: Radharaman Dutta Purakayastha; Unknown; Jagannathpur, Bengal, British Raj (now Bangladesh)
- Died: November 10, 1915 (aged 82); Jagannathpur, Assam, British India
- Other name: Radha Raman Dutta
- Occupations: Poet; Musician
- Known for: Dhamal
- Spouse: Gunamayi Devi
- Children: Bipin Bihari Dutta and 3 others
- Father: Radha Madhab Dutta

Radharaman Dutta (Bengali: রাধারমণ দত্ত; Unknown – 1915), also spelt as Radha Raman Dutta, was an influential Bengali musician and poet. A prominent member of the Bauls, Dutta's body of work has led him to be considered as the "Father of Dhamail songs". His songs are widely covered by contemporary Bengali musicians and lyricist.

== Ancestry ==
In 640, the Raja of Tripura Dharma Fa planned a ceremony and invited five Brahmans from Etawah, Mithila and Kannauj. To compensate for their long journey, the Raja granted the Brahmans land in a place which came to be known as Panchakhanda (meaning five parts). One of the five Brahmans, Ananda Shastri of Mithila, was the ancestor of Nidhipati Shastri. In 1195, the King of Tripura granted Nidhipati some land in Ita. Ita was feudal to the Kingdom of Tripura and part of its Manukul Pradesh. Nidhipati became the founder of the Ita dynasty which would later gain a Raja status through his descendant, Bhanu Narayan. Bhanu Narayan's son, Ramchandra Brahma Narayan had a son called Prabhakar Dutta. In 1612, after Khwaja Usman's successful battle against the last Ita Raja, Subid Narayan, the royal family fled to nearby kingdoms in the Sylhet region. Prabhakar fled to Alisarkul (a village in Srimangal) before seeking refuge in the Jagannathpur Kingdom. The King of Jagannathpur, Raja Vijay Singh allowed Prabhakar to live in the Keshabpur village. Later, Prabhakar's son, Sambhu Das Dutta, is made a minister under Vijay Singh. After the defeat of the Jagannathpur Kingdom by the Baniyachong Raja Habib Khan, the Dutta family decided to stay away from politics in order to protect themselves. Sambhu's son, Radha Madhab Dutta engaged himself in Sanskrit and Bengali literature. He translated Jayadeva's Gita Govinda into the Bengali language in addition to writing and composing famous songs and poems.

== Early life ==
Dutta was born on May 26, 1833 into a Bengali Kayastha zamindar family in the village of Keshabpur in Jagannathpur, which is located in present-day Sunamganj District, Bangladesh. As the youngest child of the Bengali Hindu poet Radha Madhab Dutta, Dutta displayed a musical temperament from childhood. The early death of his father led Dutta to seek the discipleship and initiation of religious mentors like Raghunath Goswami. Dutta's Vaishnavism (worship of Krishna) shaped his musical work and led him to a life of asceticism; he lived for some time in a house that amounted to little more than a seven-square-foot of mud-hut. He studied Shakta, Vaishnavism, Shaiva and Sahajiya doctrines and started performing sadhana-bhajan according to Sahajiya. Dutta was also heavily influenced by the Sufism that infuses Baul culture, and was in touch with contemporary Bengali Muslim poet Hason Raja.

== Cultural influence ==
Radharaman Datta wrote and composed over 2,000 songs and was known in particular for his "Geet" and "Dhamail" songs - compositions to traditional dance forms. He has been cited as the creator of the Dhamail art form. Dutta's compositions are performed today in weddings all over Bangladesh. Many popular Bengali songs of today were written originally by Radharaman and his songs are sung by modern professional musicians in Bangladesh and in West Bengal, India.

== Personal life ==
In 1275 BS (1868-1869 AD), he married Gunamayi Devi. She was the daughter of Nandakumar Sen Adhikari, a descendant of Sivananda Sen who was a disciple of Chaitanya Mahaprabhu. Her home village was Adpasha in present-day Ward 8, Amtail, Moulvibazar. Bipin Bihari Dutta was their only surviving child at the time of Dutta's death, with his three other children and wife dying in his lifetime.

== Death and legacy ==
On 10 November 1915, Dutta died in his own house which became his samadhi (shrine). Following his death, his disciples lit candles in the shrine everyday - a tradition which has been maintained to this day. After the fall of the Sheikh Hasina led Awami League government on 5 August 2024, no commemorative events for Dutta were held at his tomb in Keshabpur. In October 2026, a local group, the Keshabpur Islamic Organization, petitioned the Jagannathpur Upazila Nirbahi Officer to prevent any music programme near the graveyard-adjacent site.

== Notable famous songs by Radharaman ==
- Shyam Kalia Shuna Bondhu Re
- Bhromor Koio Giya
- Kare Dhekabo Moner Dhukko Go
- Sham Chikon Kalia
- Bolo Go Bolo Go Shoki
- Mone Nai Mone Nai
- Jole Jaio Na Go Rai
- O Bashi Re
- Sham Na Ki Choli la
- Jole Gia Chilam Shoi
- Ami Robo Na Robo Na Grihe
- Kalay Pran Ti Nilo (Bashi Ti Bajaiya)
- Amar Bondhu Doyamoy
- Jugol Milon Hoilo Go
- Pap Ar Punno, Kori Tare Manno
- Ke Tore Shikhailo Radhar Namti Re
- Amar Golar Har Khule Ne Ogo Lalite
- Amare Ashibar Kotha Koiya
- Joler ghate deikha ailam ki sundor Shyam Rai
