= Visvanatha Chakravarti =

Gaudiya Vaishnava acharya (c. 1626–c. 1708)

Vishvanatha Chakravarti Thakur (IAST: Viśvanātha Cakravarti Ṭhākura; c. 1626 – c. 1708) was a Gaudiya Vaishnava acharya born in the village of Devagram, which is now in the Murshidabad district of West Bengal, India. His parents were Radhi Sreni brahmanas. He also had two brothers named Rambhadra and Raghunatha.

His initiating guru was Sriyuta Krsnacarana Cakravarti of Saidabad (currently Baharampur), Murshidabad, who was fourth in the line from Narottama Dasa. Visvanatha Chakravarti resided with his guru for many years and composed many books during that time.

His studies of grammar, poetry and rhetoric were completed while he still lived at Nadia. There is a story that he defeated one conquering pandit while he himself was still only a student. From his childhood he was completely indifferent to household life. In order to keep him at home, his father had him married at a very young age. However, he finally renounced family life and came to live at Vrindavana. His family members tried to bring him back but were unsuccessful.

Sri Chakravarti Thakura took up residence with Mukunda Dasa, who lived in Krishnadasa Kaviraja Gosvami's bhajana kutir at Radha-kunda. There he very intently studied the books and letters of the Gosvamis and composed many commentaries on their writings.

He used to worship a deity named Gokulananda, which is enshrined in Vrindavana. He was also known by the pen name Harivallabha Das, under which he wrote a number of Vaishnava Padavali songs.

He composed the following books on Gaudiya Vaishnava Theology:

- Sri Madhurya Kadambini
- Vraja-riti-cintamani
- Camatkara-candrika
- Prema-samputa
- Gitavali
- Subodhini, a commentary on the Alankara-Kaustabha of Kavi Karnapura
- Ananda-Candrika, a commentary on Ujjvala-Nilamani of Rupa Goswami
- A commentary on the Gopala Tapani Upanishad
- Stavamrta-Lahri
- Sri-Krishna-bhavanamrta-mahakavya
- Sri Bhagavatamrta Kana
- Sri Ujjavala-nilamani-kirana,
- Sri Bhakti-rasamrta-sindhu-bindu, a commentary on the Bhakti-rasamrta-sindhu of Rupa Goswami
- Dana-Keli Kaumudi-tika, a commentary on the Dana-Keli Kaumudi of Rupa Goswami
- Sri Lalita-madhava-nataka-tika, a commentary on the Sanskrit drama Lalita-madhava composed by Rupa Goswami
- Sri Caitanya-caritamrta-tika (incomplete), a commentary on the Chaitanya-charitamrita by Krishnadasa Kaviraja.
- Brahma-Samhita-tika, a commentary of the Brahma Samhita.
- Sarartha-Varsini tika, a commentary of the Bhagavad Gita.
- Sarartha-darsini tika, a commentary on the Tenth Canto of the Srimad Bhagavatam.

He died on the Vasanta-pancami in the month of Magha.
