= Chaitanya Mangala =

The Chaitanya Mangala (Bengali: চৈতন্যমঙ্গল) (c. 16th century) of Lochana Dasa is an important hagiographical work on the Supreme Personality of Godhead, Sri Krishna Chaitanya - Chaitanya Mahaprabhu in Bengali. This work of Lochana Dasa or Lochananda Dasa is influenced by the Sanskrit Kadacha of Murari Gupta. The complete text is divided into four sections: the Sutra Khanda, the Adi Khanda, the Madhya Khanda and the Shesh Khanda. As this work was written for the purpose of singing only, it is not further sub-divided into chapters.

== Contents ==
The Chaitanya Mangala comprises about 11000 verses. The Sutra Khanda has around 1800 verses, the Adi Khanda has about 3300 verses, the Madhya Khanda consists nearly 4300 verses and the Shesh Khanda comprises about 1600 verses. The Sutrakhanda is a prelude to the Krishna's appearance as the Gauranga avatar in Nabadwip, which describes the events which led to this incarnation. The Adi Khanda narrates the early life of Chaitanya Mahaprabhu up to his trip to Gaya. The Madhya Khanda describes events in Mahaprabhu's later life up to his meeting with Sarvabahuma Bhattacharya. The Shesh Khanda narrates his pilgrimages to southern and northern India. Some manuscripts also consist a description of the last part of the Mahaprabhu's life till his disappearance.

== See also ==
- Chaitanya Mahaprabhu
- Chaitanya Bhagavata
