= Ananta Samhita =

Anantasaṃhitā (अनन्तसंहिता) is the name of an ancient Pāñcarātra Saṃhitā mentioned in the Padmasaṃhitā. It is the most widely followed of Saṃhitā covering the entire range of concerns of Pāñcarātra doctrine and practice (i.e., the four-fold formulation of subject matter—jñāna, yoga, kriyā and caryā) consisting of roughly 9000 verses.—[Cf. Jñānapāda chapter 1, verses 99-114]

First is explained the folly of following more than one Saṃhitā for a single series of rituals. Then the names of the 108 Tantras of the Pāñcarātra corpus are named [e.g., Anantasaṃhitā]. Even those who repeat these 108 titles will gain salvation.

Anantasaṃhitā (अनन्तसंहिता) is also mentioned in the Puruṣottamasaṃhitā: a Pāñcarātra text consisting of more than 1800 verses devoted to temple-building and the practical concerns of the Pāñcarātra priestly community.

However, a work of this name is quoted by Bhaktivinoda Thakura, in his Sri Navadvipa Mahatmya, ch. 2, and Bhaktisiddhanta Sarasvati Thakur, in his commentary to Chaitanya Bhagavata 1.1.46. In Radhastami 2018, Bhakti Purushottama Swami narrates how in the Ananta-samhita, Siva explains to Parvati why Srimati Radharani created merciful Sri Mayapur-dhama.

It's also quoted by Ishana Nagara, the household servant of Sacimata, in Advaita Prakasha, ch. 4 and 10.
