= Dhamail =

Music genre and type of dance

Dhamail (Bengali: ধামাইল), or Dhamal (Bengali: ধামাল), is a form of [Sylheti] folk music and dance prevalent in the Mymensingh and Sylhet regions of northeastern Bengal, in present-day Bangladesh.

== History ==
The word, dhamal or dhamail, can be traced back centuries. It can be found in the works of 14th-century poet Chandidas of Birbhum, 16th-century poet Dawlat Wazir Bahram Khan of Chittagong as well as 17th-century poet Daulat Qazi of Chittagong.

The folk music composers Radharaman Dutta and Arkum Shah have been cited as having introduced the dhamail dance tradition to the Sylhet region.

== Encompassment ==
It accompanies the use of mirdanga, kartals and many other musical instruments which are usually played by the men while the dance is being performed. This dance form is similar to musical chairs, where one by one the dancers are removed by the dancers who can dance very fast as the beats gear up the speed. This dance form mainly relates the love of Radha and Krishna and the inner significance of this dance form is that the newly wedded couple must unite their souls in such fashion.

The song and dance is mainly performed by the womenfolk during marriages and other auspicious occasions. The ladies moves in circle, clapping their hands to the beat of the music. The songs are first sung by the leader and then the others join the chorus. The lyrics mainly relate to Shyam (Krishna) and Radha. Gradually the tempo and dynamics increase to a peak. Breaks are then given so that the ladies can have paan, areca nut and/or tea.
