= Krishnadasa Kaviraja =

Bengali author of Chaitanya Charitamrita (1496–1588)

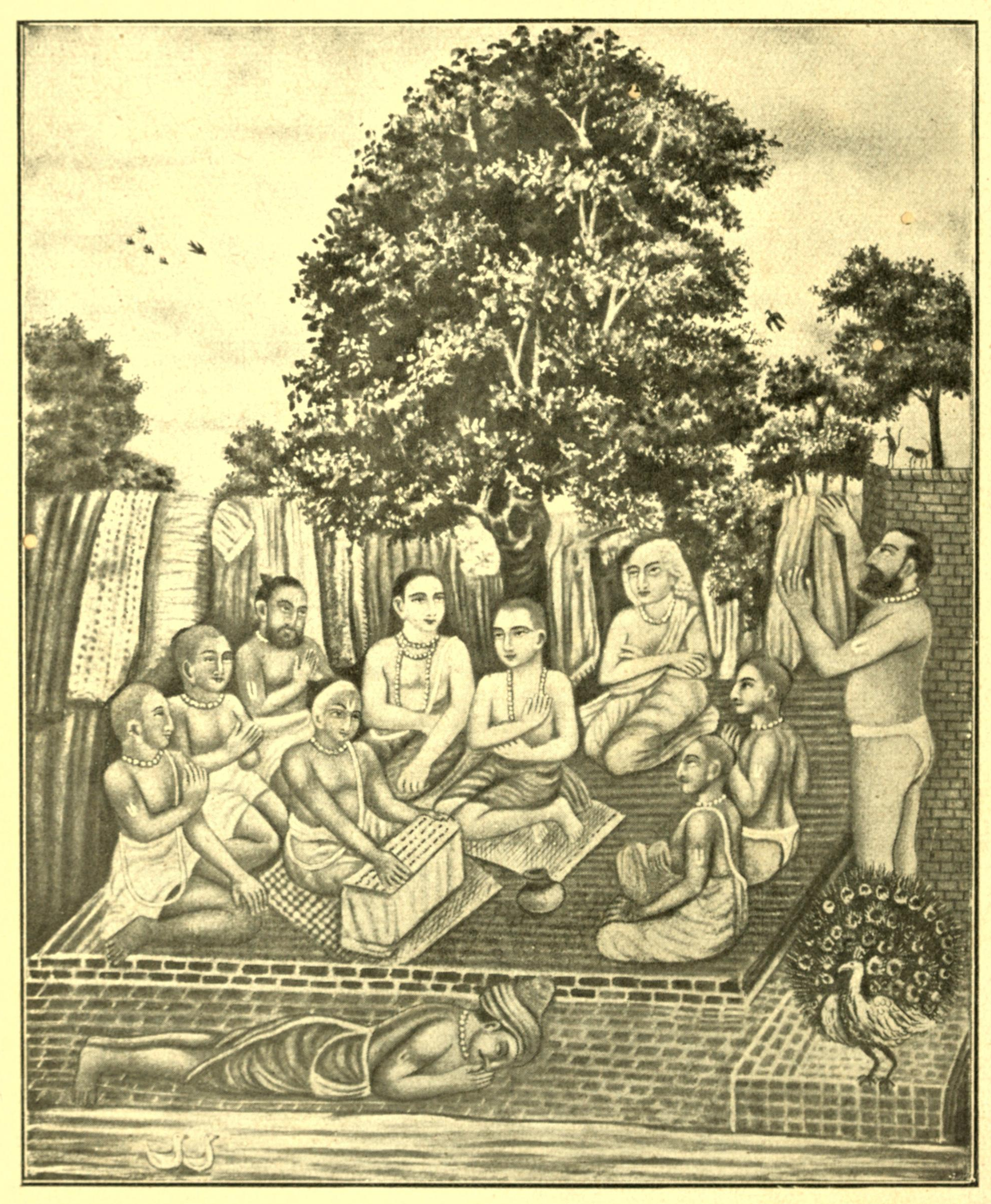
A scene from the Chaitanya Charitamrita, written by Krishnadas Kaviraj, where King Pratap Rudra bows to Chaitanya Mahaprabhu.

Krishnadasa (c. 1528 – c. 1615/1620), known by the honorific Kaviraja (Kṛṣṇôdas Kôviraj; IAST: Kṛṣṇadāsa Kavirāja), was the author of the Chaitanya Charitamrita, a biography on the life of the mystic and saint Chaitanya Mahaprabhu (1486–1534), who is considered by the Gaudiya Vaishnava school of Hinduism to be a combined incarnation of Radha and Krishna.

== Biography ==
There is scant information about the life of Krishnadasa Kaviraja. Dimock posits that this may be due to his characteristic humility. There is a lack of consensus regarding his birth year among scholars. Dinesh Chandra Sen suggests 1517 CE, though this is debated because it would mean that Krishnadasa Kaviraja was 16 years old when Chaitanya Mahaprabhu died, yet he never claims to have met him. Other more reliable estimates suggest around 1520 CE or 1450 Saka (~1528 CE). He was born in a Bengali Baidya family in the village of Jhamatpur (modern West Bengal). His father's name was Bhagiratha and his mother was named Sunandā. He also had a younger brother named Śyāmadāsa (or Śyāma Dāsa Kavirāja) who was two years younger than him.

In the esoteric tradition of the Gaudiya Vaishnavas, Krishnadasa Kaviraja is identified in Krishna's eternal Vraja pastimes. Kavi-Karṇapūra identifies him as an incarnation of the handmaiden of Radha called Ratnarekhā Mañjarī in the Śrī Gaura-Gaṇoddeśa-Dīpikā. He is also sometimes identified as Kasturī Mañjarī.

=== Early life ===
Krishnadasa’s family was relatively poor, supported by his father’s medical practice. Tragedy struck when Krishnadasa was approximately six years old, as his father died. His mother, Sunanda, faced immense difficulty supporting the two young boys and died only a few months after her husband. Consequently, the brothers were raised by relatives, likely their maternal uncles.

From his earliest years, Krishnadasa displayed a strong inclination toward renunciation (vairāgya). He was a deeply learned man, eventually becoming proficient in grammar, the six systems of philosophy, and the Vedic-Upanishadic tradition. This grounding in the scriptures began in his youth, and he eventually became a disciple of the prominent Goswamis, Rupa and Sanatana.

=== Life in Vrindavan ===
A defining moment occurred at his home in Jhamatpur during a religious gathering he organized. A servant of Nityananda, named Mīnaketana Rāmadāsa, visited while a kirtan was in progress. Krishnadasa’s brother, Shyamadasa, had strong faith in Chaitanya Mahaprabhu but lacked proper reverence for Nityananda, leading to a bitter argument between him and Mīnaketana Rāmadāsa. Krishnadasa took the side of the devotee, harshly rebuking his own brother for not recognizing that Chaitanya and Nityananda are "one body, equal in every respect". This act of devotion pleased Nityananda, who subsequently appeared to Krishnadasa in a dream and instructed him to leave his home and travel to Vrindavana, where he would attain all things. This vision marked the end of his life in Bengal and the beginning of his journey toward his eventual legacy as a primary chronicler of Gaudiya Vaishnavism. After receiving instructions in a vision from Nityananda, Krishnadasa left Bengal and travelled to Vrindavan where he took initiation from Raghunatha dasa Goswami, one of the direct followers of Chaitanya.

In Vrindavan, Krishnadasa lived the life of a scholarly recluse, dedicating himself to devotional acts, study, and writing. He became deeply integrated into the intellectual circle of the Goswamis, learning the life stories of Chaitanya Mahaprabhu from Raghunatha Dasa Goswami, and receiving guidance on theological interpretation from Jiva and Rupa Goswami. He benefitted from the substantial library the Goswamis had collected in Vrindavan, which included many rare manuscripts.

=== Writing the Chaitanya Charitamrita ===
The impetus for his masterwork came from the Vaishnava community in Vrindavan. They were concerned that the existing biography by Vrindavana Dasa, the Chaitanya Bhagavata, focused primarily on Chaitanya's early life and left his final years abbreviated or untold. They collective commanded Krishnadasa to write a comprehensive account.

Seeking divine permission, Krishnadasa prayed before the deity Madanagopala. In the presence of the local devotees, the deity's garland fell from its neck and was placed on Krishnadasa's chest by the pujari, which was taken as a miraculous sign of approval. Despite his advanced age, failing health, and near-blindness, he completed the work to bridge the gap between the scholarly Goswamis of Vrindavan and the devotees in Bengal. He vividly describes in the text itself: “I have now become too old and disturbed by invalidity. While writing, my hands tremble. I cannot remember anything, nor can I see or hear properly. Still, I write, and this is a great wonder.” Because he had lived away from Bengal for many decades, his Bengali in the text is noted for being highly Sanskritized and occasionally stilted.

To construct this comprehensive masterwork, he utilized a wide array of existing biographies, first-hand oral testimonies, and an extensive library of Sanskrit scriptures. Vrindavana Dasa's Chaitanya Bhagavata was the primary reference for Chaitanya's early life in Navadvipa and his initial years in Puri. Murari Gupta's Kadacha (notebook) called the Śrī-kṛṣṇa-caitanya-caraṇāmṛta provided the basic chronological frame for the narrative. As a contemporary schoolmate of Chaitanya, Murari Gupta's accounts were considered foundational by subsequent biographers. He also drew from Kavi Karnapura's works such as the Krishnachaitanyacharanamrita Mahakavya, and the Chaitanyachandrodaya Nataka.

For the antya-lila, or the final eighteen years of Chaitanya's life, Kishnadasa was almost entirely dependent on a specific internal lineage of information. A core source was Svarupa Damodara's Kadaca (notebook). Svarupa Damodara was Chaitanya's personal secretary in Puri and recorded the stories in Sanskrit summary verses (sutras). This physical text is now lost. Another source was Krishnadasa's direct teacher Raghunatha Dasa Gosvami, who had been under the personal care of Svarupa Damodara in Puri. He memorized Svarupa Damodar's notes and recounted them to Krishnadasa in detail. Due to its amount of detail on the life of Chaitanya and his precepts, the Chaitanya Charitamrita became the definitive biography of Chaitanya Mahaprabhu.

=== Final years ===
Because of Krishnadasa's extreme fragility, scholars conclude that he did not live long after the work was finished. He is believed to have died in Vrindavan between 1615 and 1620 CE, with some traditions narrowing the date to 1616 or 1617 CE. His samadhi (tomb) is located on the grounds of the Radha Damodar temple in Vrindavan.

A later legend within the Sahajiya tradition claims that Krishnadas died of shock after Jiva Goswami allegedly threw the manuscript of the Chaitanya Charitamrita into a well out of professional jealousy. However, this story is dismissed by mainstream scholars as "foolish", noting that the manuscript was preserved and widely published by Krishnadasa's disciple Mukunda.

== Works ==
Krishnadasa Kaviraja wrote many works apart from his most famous Chaitanya Charitamrita:

1. Caitanya-Caritāmṛta: His magnum opus as the definitive biography of Chaitanya Mahaprabhu.
2. Govinda-Lilāmṛta: This is a major Sanskrit poem that describes the pastimes of Krishna and Radha in Vrindavan over a 24 hour cycle.
3. Sārārtha-Darśinī: This is a significant Sanskrit commentary on Bilvamangala's Krishna Karnamrita.
4. Kṛṣṇa-Āhnika-Kaumudī: A work mentioned in some sources as belonging to his corpus, focusing on daily devotional activities.
5. Virudāvalī: A collection of verses in praise of the deity.

== Sources ==
- Chakraborty, Narahari (2019). Śrī Śrī Bhakti Ratnākara (in Hindi). Vrindavan: Śrī Harināma Saṃkīrtana Maṇḍala. ISBN 9788194124108.
- Dasa, Haridasa (1957). Śrī Śrī Gauḍīya Vaiṣṇava Abidhāna (in Bengali). Calcutta: Elema Press.
- Dimock Jr., Edward C. (2000). Stewart, Tony K. (ed.). Caitanya Caritāmṛta of Kṛṣṇadāsa Kavirāja: A Translation and Commentary. Cambridge: Harvard University Press. ISBN 9789394852778.
- Dutt, Romesh Chunder (1877). The Literature of Bengal: Being an Attempt to Trace the Progress of the Rational Mind in its Various Aspects, as Reflected in the Nation's Literature from the Earliest Times to the Present Day; With Copious Extracts from the Best Writers. Calcutta: I. C. Bose & Co.
- Prabhupada, His Divine Grace A.C. Bhaktivedanta Swami (1975). Śrī Caitanya Caritāmṛta: Madhya Līlā Volume 1 (PDF). California: The Bhaktivedanta Book Trust. ISBN 0-912776-63-3.
- Raychaudhari, Tapankumar (1953). Bengal Under Akbar and Jahangir: an Introductory Study in Social History. Calcutta: A. Mukherjee & Co., Ltd. ISBN 9788121503563.
- Stewart, Tony K. (2010). The Final Word: The Caitanya Caritāmṛta and the Grammar of Religious Tradition (PDF). New York: Oxford University Press. ISBN 9780195392722.
- Tirth, Swami B. B. (2001). Sri Chaitanya: His Life & Associates. San Rafael, CA: Mandala Publishing. ISBN 9781886069282.

== See also ==
- Gaudiya Vaishnavism
- Chaitanya Mahaprabhu
- Nityananda
