= Chaitanya Charitamrita =

Biography of Caitanya Mahāprabhu

The Chaitanya Charitamrita (Sanskrit: चैतन्यचरितामृतम्, romanized: Caitanya-caritāmṛtam; Bengali: চৈতন্যচরিতামৃত, romanized: Côitônyôcôritamṛtô), composed by Krishnadasa Kaviraja between c. 1582 and the early 17th century, is one of the primary biographies detailing the life and teachings of Caitanya Mahāprabhu, the founder of Gaudiya Vaishnavism. It is written in Bengali with a great number of Sanskrit verses in its devotional, poetic construction, including Shikshashtakam. The stories of Chaitanya's life are mixed with philosophical conversations detailing the process of Bhakti yoga, with special attention given to congregational chanting of the names of Krishna.

== Contents ==
The Chaitanya Caritamrta is divided into three sections: Adi-lila (Early pastimes), Madhya-lila (Middle pastimes) and Antya-lila (Final pastimes). Each section refers to a particular phase in Chaitanya Mahaprabhu's life:

=== Adi-lila ===
The Adi-lila explains Chaitanya's unique theological identity as Krishna appearing in the mood and complexion of Radharani, a combined avatar. It describes the dual identity of Radha and Krishna using both direct statements and metaphorical explanations. The section also details Chaitanya's six transcendental expansions, his family lineage, his childhood companions, and his early devotional associates. It concludes with a brief summary of his life up to his acceptance of sannyasa, the renounced order of life.

=== Madhya-lila ===
The Madhya-lila is the longest section and covers Chaitanya's sannyasa; the life of his predecessor Madhavendra Puri's; and his philosophical debate with Sarvabhauma Bhattacharya (Advaitin scholar), where he argues for the supremacy of bhakti over the impersonal liberation. It also details Chaitanya's pilgrimage to South India; the daily and annual activities during the Ratha Yatra festival at the Jagannath Temple (Puri, Odisha) and of other festive observance. A significant portion of this section contains Chaitanya's instructions on the process of Bhakti yoga to his two principal disciples Rupa Goswami and Sanatana Goswami.

=== Antya-lila ===
The Antya-lila describes the devotional plays composed by Rupa Goswami, Chaitanya's interactions with the occasional critics, and his relationships with devotees such as Raghunatha dasa Goswami, and Jagadananda Pandita.The section focuses on Chaitanya's increasing agony of separation from Krishna a devotional mood known as viraha or vipralambha bhava. It concludes with the Chaitanya's Shikshashtakam, eight verses of poetic instruction.

== Composition of the Chaitanya Charitamrita ==
Although the author, Krishnadasa Kaviraja, never met Chaitanya Mahaprabhu personally, his guru, Raghunatha dasa Goswami, was an associate of Chaitanya and was close to others who were intimates of him. In composing his work, Krishnadasa Kaviraja also referred to the Shri Krishna Chaitanya Charanamrita (Śrī-kṛṣṇa-caitanya-caraṇāmṛta) of Murari Gupta and also the works of Svarupa Damodara, both of whom knew Chaitanya.

Krishna Dasa Kaviraja composed the Chaitanya Charitamrita in his old age after being requested by the Vaishnavas of Vrindavana to write a hagiography about the life of Chaitanya. Although there was already a biography written by Vrindavana Dasa, called the Chaitanya Bhagavata, the later years of Chaitanya's life were not detailed in that work. Krishna Dasa's Chaitanya Charitamrita covers Chaitanya's later years and also explains in detail the rasa philosophy that Chaitanya and his followers expounded. The Chaitanya Charitamrita also serves as a compendium of Gaudiya Vaishnava practices and outlines the Gaudiya theology developed by the Goswamis in metaphysics, ontology and aesthetics.

The Chaitanya Charitamrita was frequently copied and widely circulated amongst the Vaishnava communities of Bengal and Odisha during the early 17th Century. Its popularity during this period can be attributed to the propagation of three Vaishnava preachers, Narottama Dasa, Shyamananda and Srinivasa, who were trained by Jiva Goswami and Krishnadasa Kaviraja himself. These preachers traveled extensively throughout Bengal and Odisha, establishing copies of the text in major temple libraries and monastic centers, thereby ensuring its preservation and dissemination across the region.

== Modern publication and translations ==
In 1913, the earliest (partial) English translation of the Chaitanya Charitamrita was authored by Jadunath Sarkar, entitled Chaitanya's Life And Teachings. It remains recognized among some academics for Sarkar's use of creative language and prose, as opposed to other translators who opt for literal interpretations. It is still in print; the latest edition was issued in March 2025.

Despite the introduction of Jadunath Sarkar's Chaitanya's Life And Teachings in Western academia, the Caitanya-caritāmṛta would not reach mainstream Western audiences until the emergence of the Hare Krishna Movement.

In 1974, A. C. Bhaktivedanta Swami Prabhupada (founder of the Hare Krishna Movement), published Śrī Caitanya-caritāmṛta in English as a 17-volume set of books. It includes the original verses, transliterations, translations, and purports. His commentaries are based on Bhaktivinoda Thakur's Amrita Pravaha and Bhaktisiddhanta Sarasvati's Anubhasya commentaries. This publication significantly popularized the Chaitanya Charitamrita in the Western world, making it accessible to English-speaking audiences and establishing it as a central scripture of the Hare Krishna movement.

== See also ==
- Bhagavad Gita
- Bhagavata Purana
- Chaitanya Bhagavata
- Gouranga
- Hare Krishna (mantra)
- Nityananda
- Pancha Tattva
- Six Goswamis of Vrindavan

== Bibliography ==
Publications

- Sri Chaitanya-charitamrta (in Bengali), published by Sri Chaitanya Matha. Kolkata, 1992.

Printed sources

- Stewart, Tony K. (2010). The Final Word: The Caitanya Caritāmṛta and the Grammar of Religious Tradition. New York: Oxford University Press. ISBN 978-0-19-539272-2.
- Śrī Caitanya-caritāmṛta. Translated by A. C. Bhaktivedanta Swami Prabhupada. Bhaktivedanta Book Trust. ISBN 0-912776-50-1. LCCN 74193363. Wikidata Q108771289.
- Kaviraja, Krishna-das (2025). Chaitanya's Life and Teachings. Translated by Sarkar, Jadunath (2nd ed.). Sr Gouranga Press. ISBN 9789366380247.
- Kavirāja, Krsṇadāsa (2023). Śrī Śrī Caitanya Caritāmṛta, Ā di-līlā, Part-1. Haryana, India: BHAKTIVEDANTA VANA MAHARAJA PUBLICATIONS. ISBN 978-93-5912-891-7.
- Kavirāja, Kṛṣṇadāsa (1996). Sri Caitanya-Caritamrta Antya-Lila Volume Two: Chapters 9-20. Translated by Prabhupada, A.C. Bhaktivedanta Swami. The Bhaktivedanta Book Trust.
- Kṛṣṇadāsa Kavirāja (1974), Śrī Caitanya-caritāmṛta of Kṛṣṇadāsa Kavirāja. Vol. 1: Ādi-līlā Kṛṣṇadāsa Kavirāja glorifies the Lord and His Associates, translated by Prabhupada, A.C. Bhaktivedanta Swami, New York: The Bhaktivedanta Book Trust, ISBN 978-0-912776-50-7
- Prabhupada, A.C. Bhaktivedanta Swami (2017) [1 January 1968]. Teachings of Lord Caitanya. The Bhaktivedanta Book Trust. ISBN 9780892135370.
- Das, Rahul Peter (1993). "Neuere Werke zum bengalischen Vaiṣṇavismus". Zeitschrift der Deutschen Morgenländischen Gesellschaft. 143 (1): 135–178. ISSN 0341-0137. JSTOR 43378577.
- Bryant, Edwin F.; Ekstrand, Maria L., eds. (2004). The Hare Krishna Movement: The Postcharismatic Fate of a Religious Transplant. New York: Columbia University Press. p. 132. ISBN 978-0231122566.

Web sources

- Stewart, Tony K. (2012). "Chaitanya Charitamrita". In Islam, Sirajul; Jamal, Ahmed A. (eds.). Banglapedia: National Encyclopedia of Bangladesh (in Bengali and English) (2nd ed.). Asiatic Society of Bangladesh.
