= Gauranga =

Bengali saint and founder of Gaudiya Vaishnavism

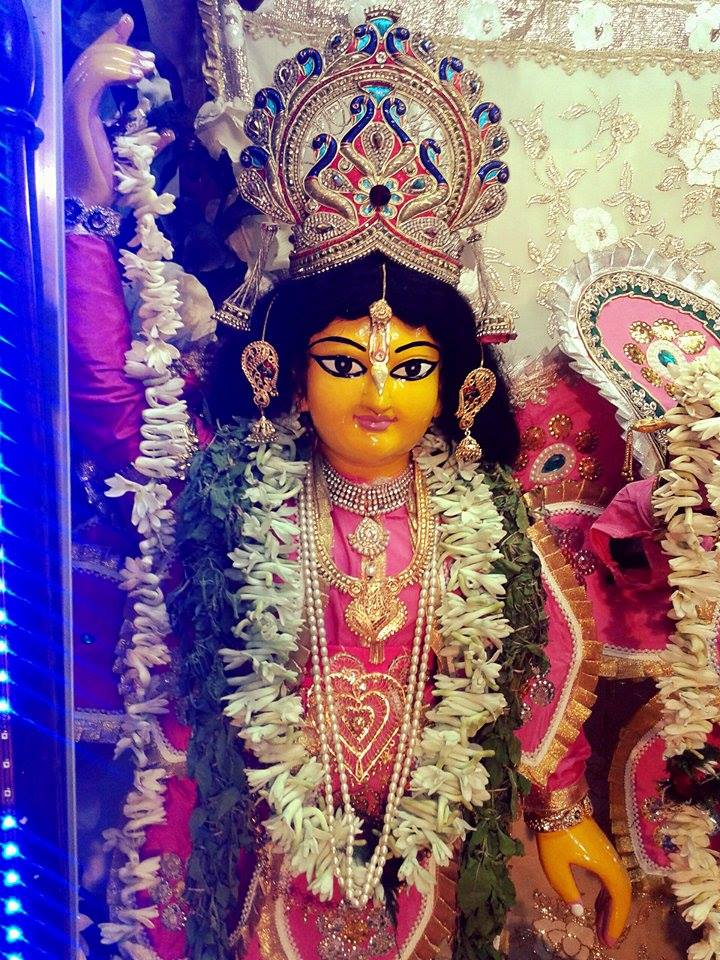
A Murti (Deity) of Lord Shri Gauranga Mahaprabhu

Gauranga is another name for Chaitanya Mahaprabhu (or Gauranga Mahaprabhu), the 16th century founder of Gaudiya Vaishnavism. The term Gauranga Mahaprabhu references Chaitanya possessing the golden complexion of the goddess Radha as an avatar of Krishna.

== Nomenclature ==
- 'Gauranga' (Bengali গৌরাঙ্গ; Sanskrit गौराङ्ग; IAST: Gaurāṅga) means 'having a white, yellowish, or golden complexion'. The term is a bahuvrihi compound from:
  - 'Gaura' (Sanskrit गौर) which means 'fair', 'gold', 'yellow', and 'saffron' (in complexion)
  - 'Anga' (or 'aGga', Sanskrit अङ्ग) which means 'limb', 'constituent', and 'component part' (of Krishna)

== Gaudiya Vaishnavism ==
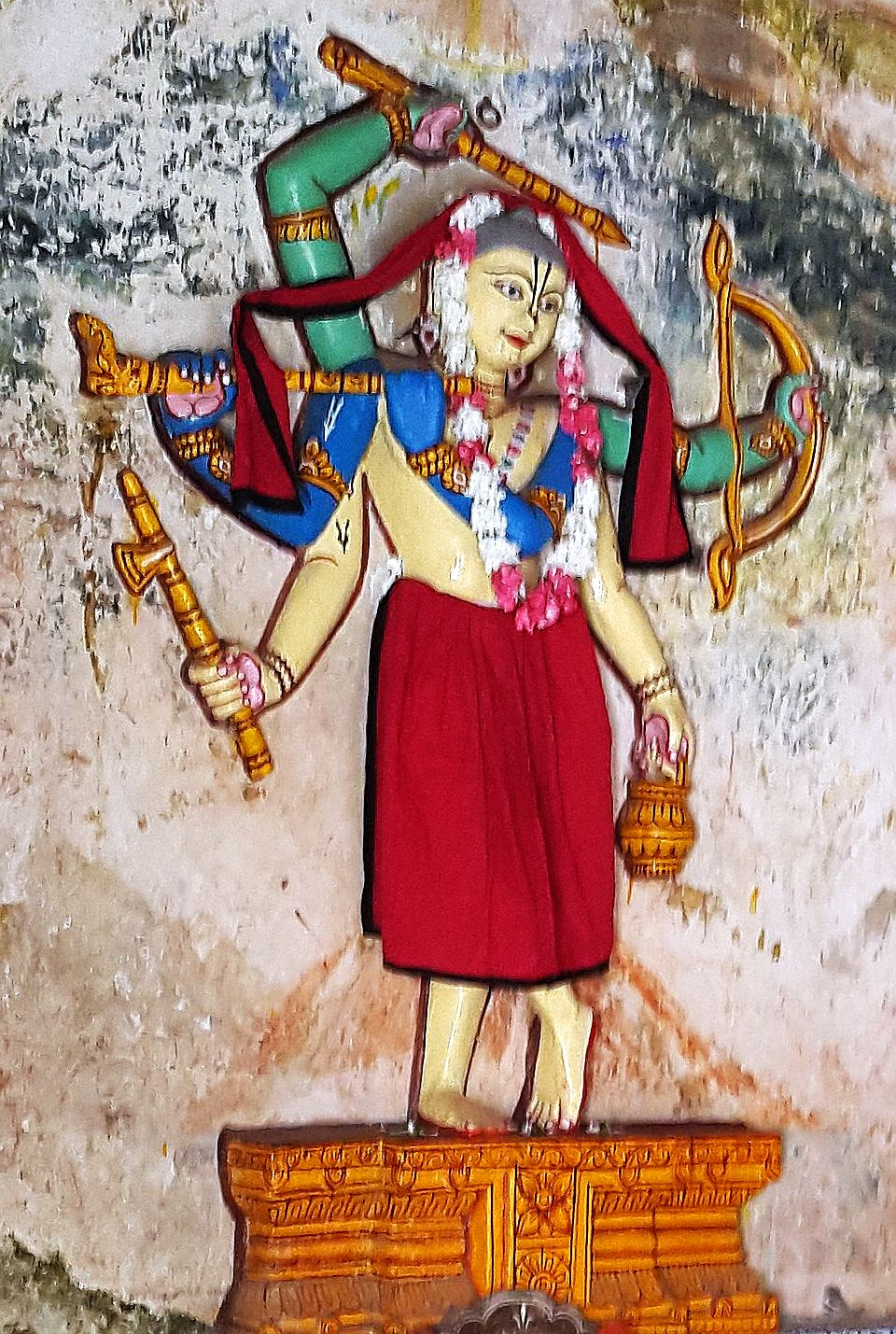
The deity of shadabhuja gauranga to commemorate Chaitanya Mahaprabhu manifesting as Vishnu at the Ganga mata math in Puri

The term 'Gauranga' is relevant in Gaudiya Vaishnavism due to scriptural verses such as the following found in the Bhagavata Purana:

In the Age of Kali, intelligent persons perform congregational chanting to worship the incarnation of Godhead who constantly sings the names of Kṛṣṇa. Although His complexion is not blackish [ākṛṣṇaṁ], He is Kṛṣṇa Himself. He is accompanied by His associates, servants, weapons and confidential companions.

— Canto 11, Chapter 5, Verse 32

'Krsna' (or 'Krishna', Sanskrit कृष्ण) means 'black'; 'Akṛṣṇam' ('a-krsna-m') means 'not black' or 'golden'. 'Gauranga' refers to the golden skin complexion of Chaitanya Mahaprabhu, most notable for popularising the 16 syllable "Hare Krishna" maha-mantra, also known as the Nama-Sankirtan (congregational chanting of the Holy-names of the Lord):

Hare Krishna, Hare Krishna
Krishna Krishna, Hare Hare
Hare Rama, Hare Rama
Rama Rama, Hare Hare

This mantra is intended to spread love for God without seeing any mundane qualification or characteristic such as color, cast, creed, or nationality.

He came as a devotee of the Lord to teach the conditioned souls how to discharge devotional service properly. The master is teaching the servant by his own example. Therefore, the path chalked out by Lord Chaitanya is taken as the most perfect by all the acharyas (learned authorities from disciplic succession). Shrila Bhaktisiddhanta Sarasvati Prabhupada, the spiritual master of A.C. Bhativedanta Swami Prabhupada has sung: Śrī-kṛṣṇa-Caitanya rādhā-kṛṣṇa nahe anya (Lord Shri Krishna Caitanya is non-different from Radha-Krishna) - as He Lord Chaitanya is Krishna himself in the mood of his best devotee - Shrimati Radharani - who excels everyone in her service, love and devotion to the Lord.

His principle teachings are that the soul or the living entity is the eternal servant of Lord Krishna and it can obtain true happiness only by serving him with love and devotion and that the chanting of the holy names of the Lord is the only means of spiritual realization in this age.

=== Hare Krishna movement ===
Within ISKCON, A. C. Bhaktivedanta Swami Prabhupada propagated that whoever hears, reads, or speaks the name gaurāṅga is blessed with fortune and happiness due to Chaitanya's saintly nature.

A. C. Bhaktivedanta Swami Prabhupada promoted singing Gauranga's name and dancing in the streets as one of the most important and effective ways to help distribute "the mercy of Lord Gauranga".

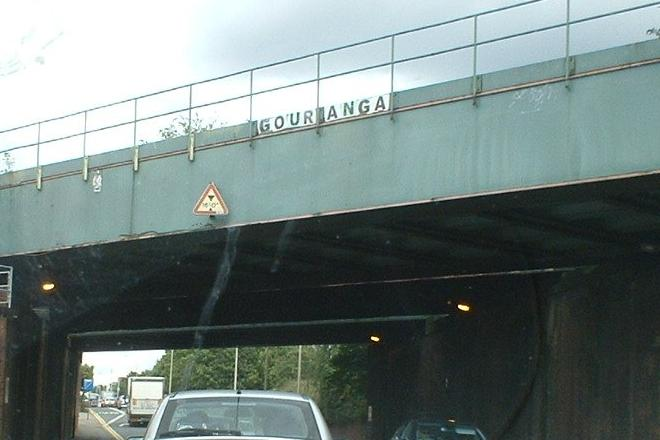
A Gauranga installation on a railway bridge in Leicester

Stickers bearing the word Gouranga or stating "Call out Gouranga and be happy!" began appearing on bridges over motorways and railways in Scotland, the North of the Bhaktivedanta Manor in England and north of Wales from the mid-nineties onwards. Stickers and fridge magnets with the phrase have also been handed out by Hare Krishna devotees at music festivals throughout the UK.

== In popular culture ==
The song "Twydale's Lament" from the album Achtung Bono by Half Man Half Biscuit has the lyrics "Gauranga Gauranga, yes I'll be happy, when you've been arrested for defacing the bridge."

The word is involved in one of the many Easter eggs in the first of the Grand Theft Auto video game series. The game displays the text "GOURANGA!" whenever the player runs over a complete group of Hare Krishnas, who are occasionally featured as pedestrians. "GOURANGA" is also the name the player has to enter in Grand Theft Auto 2 to enable the cheat mode. Additionally, in the online GTA IV mode, the message "Player X Gouranga'd Player Y" appears occasionally when a player is killed by running over with a vehicle.

== See also ==
- Hare Krishna (mantra)
- Hare Krishna in popular culture
- Chaitanya Mahaprabhu
- Chaitanya Bhagavata
