= Kavi Karnapura =

16th century Bengali Poet

- কবি কর্ণপুরা
- Born: Paramananda Sen; 1524; Nadia, Bengal
- Died: Unknown; Vrindavan, Uttar Pradesh
- Occupations: Poet, saint
- Writing career
- Language: Bengali
- Genre: Gaudiya vaishnavism philosophy
- Notable works: Chaitanya Charanamrita, Chaitanya Chandrodaya, Alamkara-Kaustubha, Śrī Kṛṣṇa Caitanya Candrasya Sahasranama Stotram, Gaura-ganoddesha-dipika.

Kavi Karnapura or Kavikarnapura (Bengali: কবি কর্ণপূর, born as Paramananda Sen) was a 16th-century Indian Bengali poet in Sanskrit; best known for verse works, Chaitanya Charanamrita (Mahakavya) and Chaitanya Chandrodaya (Nataka). He was a junior contemporary of Chaitanya Mahaprabhu.

== Life and works ==
Kavi Karnapura was born as (Paramananda Sen) the son of Shivananda Sen, a Vaidya and a prominent disciple of Chaitanya. He was born on 1524 in Nadia district of Bengal, about a decade before Chaitanya's passing in 1533 and met Chaitanya several times in Puri and was received the honorific title of 'Kavi Karnapura' (he who adorns the poets' ears with nectar of poetry) by Svarup Damodar. He was spent his last days at Vrindavan.

He has written extensively on the life and teaching of Chaitanya and on the faith of bhakti movement. These include the 'Mahakavya' and 'Nataka' referred to earlier, Alamkara-Kaustubha (on devotional sentiments), Gaura-ganoddesha-dipika (Hagiology), Ananda -Vrindavana-Champa (Interpretation of Krishnalila) and a commentary on the Srimad Bhagavat. Karnapura sought to systematize the faith within a theoretical framework.
