= Kumkum Chatterjee =

Indian American historian

Kumkum Chatterjee (née Banerjee; 12 June 1958, in Kolkata – 13 December 2012, in State College, Pennsylvania) was an Indian American historian, best known for her works Europe Observed: Multiple Gazes in Early Modern Encounters (2008) and The Cultures of History in Early Modern India (2009). She was professor of history and Asian studies at Pennsylvania State University.
