= Svarupa Damodara =

Svarupa Damodara, / Swarup Damodar also known as Purushottama Acharya was a Gaudiya Vaishnava saint and close associate of Chaitanya Mahaprabhu. He lived in Navadvipa. He always stayed with Chaitanya.

Purushottama Acharya did not accept the dress of a sannyasi, but only gave up the shikha and sacred thread. His name became Svarupa. After this, taking up the order of his sannyasa-guru, Purushottama Acharya went to Jagannatha Puri. At that time, he again met with Chaitanya. Swarup Damodar was the avatar of Lalita Sakhi of Vraj mandal dham. In the Nawadeep lila Lalita sakhi appeared as Swarup Damodar Goswami. Svarupa Damodara always stayed near the Lord. Whatever mood the Lord was in, Svarupa Damodara would perform kirtan to augment the Lord's internal sentiments. Around the same time that Svarupa Damodara came to Puri, Shri Ramananda Raya arrived from Vidyanagara. Shri Ramananda Raya was a great poet and could explain everything in a very elegant style. Shri Chaitanya Mahaprabhu heard Many valuable and secrets of Bhakti tatva, Prem Tatva, Radha Krishna Tatta, Ras tatva and many other topics from Ramanand Rai, in South India near the bank of river Godavari river .
