= Murari Gupta =

Murari Gupta (fl. 16th century) was born in a Baidya family in Sylhet district (Goyalabazar).He was a prominent Bengali physician, poet, and a key figure in Vaishnavism. Coming from a family of Ayurvedic practitioners, he was known for his spiritual devotion, which followers believed allowed him to cure not only physical ailments but also the "disease of material existence."

He became a devotee of Chaitanya Mahaprabhu and moved to Nabadwip, which was a major center of learning at the time. According to Gaudiya Vaishnava tradition, Murari Gupta is regarded as an incarnation of Hanuman.

A hallmark of his life was his unwavering devotion to Shri Sita Ram. As documented in Gaudiya Vaishnava texts, Chaitanya Mahaprabhu once tested his loyalty by asking him to abandon Rama and worship Krishna. Murari Gupta's distress at the thought of leaving his chosen deity so pleased Chaitanya that he praised Murari's steadfastness and confirmed his eternal devotion to Rama. Within the tradition, this episode is a famous example of unwavering spiritual loyalty.

In 1513, he composed the Shri Krishna Chaitanya Charanamrita (Śrī-kṛṣṇa-caitanya-caraṇāmṛta a.k.a. murāri-gupta-kaṛchā), a poetic biography of Chaitanya Mahaprabhu written in Sanskrit. This work is the earliest source for Chaitanya's life. Later hagiographies are based on this work such as the Chaitanya Charitamrita.
