= Chaitanya Bhagavata =

Hagiography of Caitanya Mahāprabhu written by Vrindavana Dasa Thakura

Śrī Caitanya-bhāgavata (Bengali: চৈতন্য ভাগবত) is a hagiography of Caitanya Mahāprabhu written by Vrindavana Dasa Thakura (1507–1589 CE). It was the first full-length work regarding Chaitanya Mahaprabhu written in Bengali language and documents his early life and role as the founder of the Gaudiya Vaishnava tradition. The text details Chaitanya's theological position as a combined Avatar of both Radha and Krishna within the belief of his close associates and followers. The writing of Chaitanya Bhagavata was commissioned by Nityananda, who was the guru of Vrindavana Dasa Thakura and close friend of Chaitanya Mahaprabhu.

== Name ==
Initially, the Chaitanya Bhagavata was named Chaitanya Mangala. Krishnadasa Kaviraja also mentioned this work by this name. According to the Premavilasa of Narottama Dasa, when it was discovered that the poet Lochana Dasa had also written a work with this title, the leading members of the Vaishnava community in Vrindavan met and decided that Vrindavana Dasa's book would be known as the Chaitanya Bhagavata with Lochana Dasa's book remaining as the Chaitanya Mangala.

== Divisions ==
The Chaitanya Bhagavata is divided into three parts: the Adi-khanda, Madhya-khanda and Antya-khanda:

Adi-khanda

The Adi-khanda consists of sixteen adhyayas (chapters). It deals with the socio-religious situation of Bengal before the advent of Chaitanya Mahaprabhu, his birth, education, and marriage to Lakshmi-priya; his defeating opposing scholars, his visit to East Bengal, the passing of Lakshmi-priya, his marriage to Vishnupriya and his trip to Gaya and subsequent initiation from Ishvara Puri.

Madhya-khanda

The Madhya-khanda consists of twenty-seven adhyayas (chapters). It narrates Chaitanya's growing external displays of devotion, the disciples which join his devotional creed, the conversion of the debauchees Jagai and Madhai, and Chaitanya's civil disobedience movement against the Muslim Chand Kazi who tries to stop the congregational chanting of the names of Krishna.

Antya-khanda

The Antya-khanda consists of ten adhyayas (chapters). It portrays Chaitanya's acceptance of sannyasa (the renounced order), his mother Saci-Mata's lamentation, his travels to Puri, his meeting with the logician Sarvabhauma Bhattacharya and his relationships and interactions with different devotees.

In two of the manuscripts of the Chaitanya Bhagavat, three additional chapters are found at the end of the Antya-khanda, which are not accepted as the part of the original text by most of the modern scholars.

== Importance ==
The Chaitanya Bhagavata (similarly to the Chaitanya Charitamrita) asserts that Chaitanya was not simply a saint or even a "regular" Avatar, but was instead the direct incarnation of Krishna as Bhagavan, or the Supreme God himself. The text gives Chaitanya's mission as one for the benefit of mankind, through beginning the yuga-dharma (harinam-sankirtana) for the present age of Kali Yuga. Chaitanya Mahaprabhu is quoted within as saying "My holy name will be sung (preached) in every town and village of earth". The author, Vrindavana Dasa, has been considered by Gaudiya Vaishnavas to be the Vyasa of Chaitanya's pastimes because of revealing his true nature and mission.

The Bhagavata has been praised for its simplicity in that it does not cross into the ontological nuances that are found in Krishna Dasa Kaviraja's Chaitanya Charitamrita. The Charitamrita of Krishna Dasa gives a more sophisticated and theological view of the life of Chaitanya Mahaprabhu and provides more information on his years in Puri as an ascetic. Together, the texts of the Chaitanya Bhagavata and the Chaitanya Charitamrta provide a complete picture of the life and teachings of Chaitanya Mahaprabhu although there are many more of his biographies and other writings about him.

Scholars are of the opinion that Vrindavana Dasa wrote the Chaitanya Bhagavata somewhere in the mid-1540s.

== Vrindavana Dasa Thakura ==
Vrindavana Dasa Thakura or Brindaban Das (1507–1589) is best known as the author of the Chaitanya Bhagavata. Vrindavana Dasa was born in Mamgachi in the Navadvipa area of West Bengal. His mother was Narayani, the niece of Srivasa Pandit, a direct follower of Chaitanya Mahaprabhu. Vrindavana Dasa's father, Vaikunthanatha Vipra, was from Sylhet in East Bengal. However, it is said that his father died before he was born and so his mother moved to the house of Srivasa in Mayapura. In his youth Vrindavana Dasa took initiation from Nityananda, one of the main associates of Chaitanya and he was apparently the last disciple that Nityananda accepted.

In 1535, Vrindvana Dasa wrote the Chaitanya Bhagavata. Initially, the Chaitanya Bhagavata was named Chaitanya Mangala. However the poet Lochana Dasa also wrote a work with this title. Therefore, the leading Vaishnavas in Vrindavana met and decided that henceforth Vrindavana Dasa's book would be known as the Chaitanya Bhagavata, and Lochana Dasa's book would remain as the Chaitanya Mangala.

Vrindavana Dasa is considered by Gaudiya Vaishnavas as the Vyasa of Chaitanya's pastimes, since he was the first to reveal that Chaitanya was God himself and not just an incarnation of Godhead.

It would seem that the Chaitanya Bhagavata was the only major work written by Vrindavana Dasa. There are a number of other works attributed to him but their authorship has not been validated.

== See also ==
- Gaudiya Vaishnavism
- International Society for Krishna Consciousness
- Six Goswamis

== Bibliography ==
- Tirtha, Swami B.B., Sri Caitanya and His Associates, 2002, Mandala Publishing, San Francisco.
- Mahayogi Swami B.V., Lives of the Saints, translated from Gaura Parsada Citravali, unpublished work.
- Sahitya Academi site (https://web.archive.org/web/20080914033637/http://www.sahitya-akademi.gov.in/old_version/glos.htm)
- Encyclopaedia Of Bangladesh (Set Of 30 Vols.) By Nagendra Kr. Singh - Page 309
