= Chaitanya Mahaprabhu =

Indian Vaishnavite Hindu saint (1486–1534)

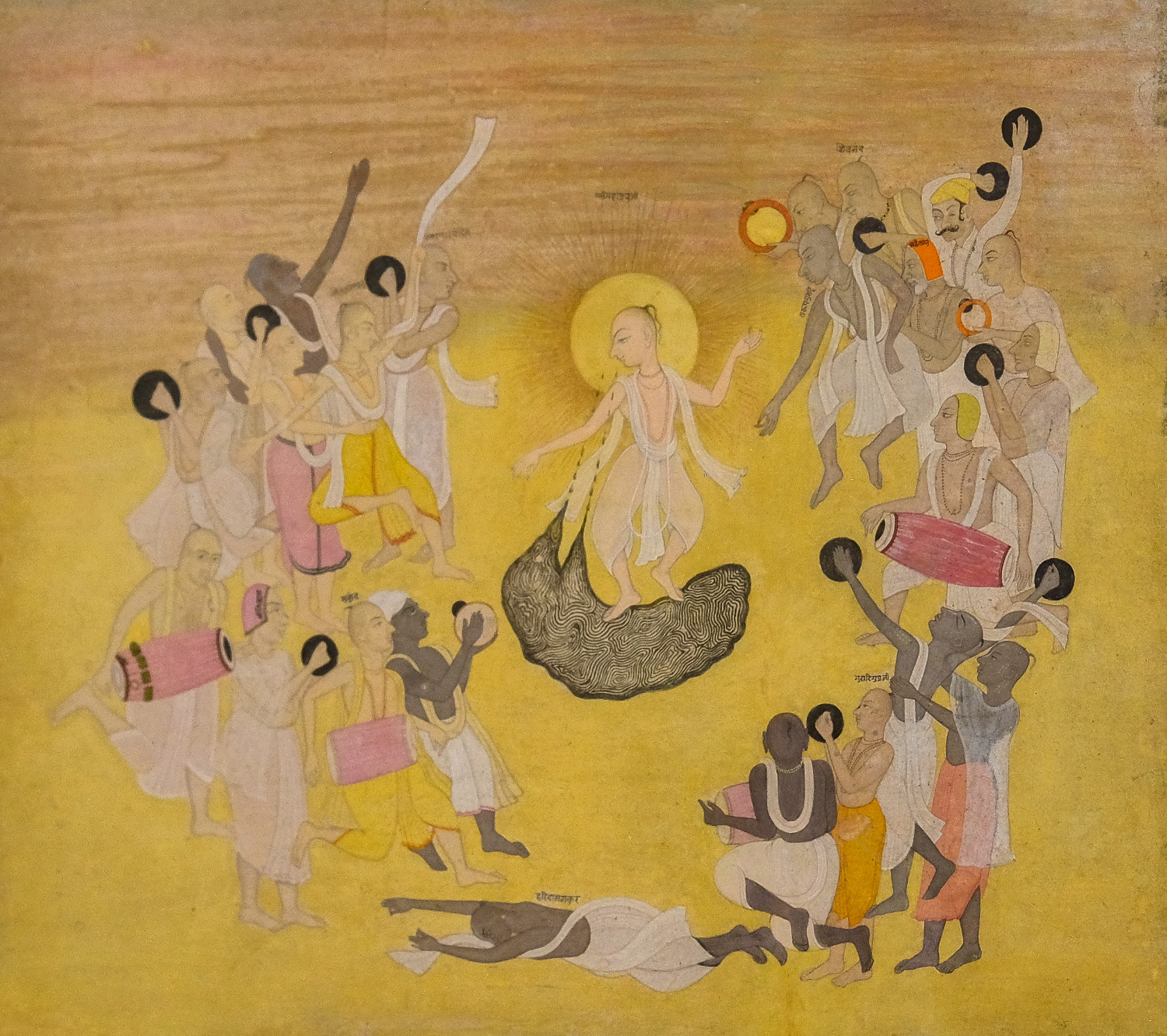
- Posthumous Kisangarh painting of Chaitanya dancing in a puddle of his own tears, surrounded by followers, c. 1750.

Personal life
- Born: Vishvambhara Mishra; 18 February 1486 Nabadwip, Bengal Sultanate (present-day West Bengal, India)
- Died: 14 June 1534 (aged 48) Puri, Gajapati Empire (present-day Odisha, India)
- Spouse: Lakshmi Priya (first wife) and Vishnupriya
- Notable work: Shikshashtakam
- Known for: Expounded Gaudiya Vaishnavism, kirtan

Religious life
- Religion: Hinduism
- Founder of: Gaudiya Vaishnavism; Achintya Bheda Abheda
- Philosophy: Bhakti yoga, Achintya Bheda Abheda

Religious career
- Teacher: Swami Isvara Puri (mantra guru); Swami Kesava Bharati (sannyas guru)
- Disciples: Rupa Goswami, Sanatana Goswami, Gopala Bhatta Goswami, Raghunatha Bhatta Goswami, Raghunatha dasa Goswami, Jiva Goswami, others

Chaitanya Mahaprabhu (Bengali: মহাপ্রভু শ্রীচৈতন্য দেব; Sanskrit: चैतन्य महाप्रभु, romanized: Caitanya Mahāprabhu), born Vishvambhara Mishra (IAST: Viśvambhara Miśra) (18 February 1486 – 14 June 1534), was an Indian Hindu saint from Bengal and the founder of Gaudiya Vaishnavism. Chaitanya Mahaprabhu's mode of worshipping Krishna with bhajan-kirtan and dance influenced Vaishnavism in Bengal. He is often considered to be an incarnation of lord Krishna. He is also sometimes considered to be the combined Avatar of goddess Radha and lord Krishna.

He is considered the chief proponent of the Vedantic philosophy of Achintya Bheda Abheda. The concept of inconceivable difference in non-difference, known as achintya-bhedabheda, was explained later by Jiva Goswami in his book Bhagavat Sandharbha, and in his Sarva-samvadini.

Mahaprabhu founded Gaudiya Vaishnavism. He expounded Bhakti yoga and popularised the chanting of the Hare Krishna Maha-mantra. He composed the Shikshashtakam (eight devotional prayers).

Chaitanya is sometimes called Gauranga (IAST: Gaurāṅga) or Gaura due to his molten gold–like complexion. He is also called Nimai because he was born underneath a Neem tree.

== Life ==
The religious hagiographies of Gauḍīya sampradāya are the only sources available for the reconstruction of Chaitanya's life. These texts (in Sanskrit and Bengali), consider Chaitanya to be an avatāra of Kṛṣṇa, Svayaṁ Bhagavān, Rādhā-Kr̥ṣṇa (joint and separate), Nārāyaṇa, Viṣṇu, and Jagannātha. A canonical narrative was established in early 1600s through the Caitanya Caritāmṛta of Kṛṣṇadāsa Kavirāja, which is regarded within the tradition as the "final word" on Gauḍīya history and theology.

== Birth ==
Chaitanya was born in Nabadwip, in the Nadia district of present-day West Bengal, on the evening of Friday, 18 February 1486, although some accounts give the date as 27 February. His birth occurred on the full moon during a lunar eclipse in the Hindu month of Phālguna. He was the tenth child of Jagannātha Miśra, a Brahmin originally from Sylhet, and his wife, Śacidevī. Traditional accounts state that eight of the couple's previous children, all daughters, died in infancy. Chaitanya's only surviving elder sibling was his brother, Viśvarūpa. At birth, he was given the name Viśvambhara, but he became widely known by the nickname Nīmai. Neighbors also called him Gauraṅga or Gaura, meaning "fair-complexioned", because of his bright complexion. Hagiographies portray his birth as a divine event that foretold his future mission of propagating harināma saṃkīrtana in Kali Yuga.

=== Family and paternal ancestry ===
Chaitanya's father, Jagannātha Miśra, also known as Purandhara Miśra, left his ancestral home in Dhakadakshin, Sylhet, in present-day Bangladesh, and settled in Nabadwip. He reportedly moved there to pursue higher education and to live on the banks of the Ganges. His mother, Śacidevī, was the daughter of Nīlāmbara Chakravartī, a scholar and astrologer. Nīlāmbara was reportedly a fellow student of prominent scholars such as Bishārada, the father of Sārvabhauma Bhaṭṭācārya. According to the biographer Jayānanda in the Caitanya Maṅgala, the family's earlier roots lay in Jajpur, Odisha. Chaitanya's paternal grandfather, generally identified in historical records and hagiographies as Upendra Miśra, is said to have migrated from Jajpur to Sylhet during the reign of Kapilendra Deva, around 1451 CE. Some genealogical traditions trace the paternal line further back through Madhukar Miśra and Viśuddha Miśra.

== Childhood ==
In his infancy, he would reportedly not stop crying unless the women of the neighborhood chanted the names of God. His parents reportedly discovered the symbols of a banner, thunderbolt, conch, and discus on his feet. This led his maternal grandfather Nīlāmbara Chakravartī to predict that the child would be an extraordinary figure.

There are several legends associated with his childhood. He was reportedly found playing with a venomous snake in his yard. On another occasion he sat on a pile of discarded cooking pots to teach his mother that nothing is impure if it is used in the service of God. He was once kidnapped by two thieves to steal his gold jewelry. However, the thieves reportedly became disoriented and "bewitched" by the child so that they inadvertently carried him back to his own doorstep, thinking that they were at their own destination. A visiting Brahmin once prepared an offering for his deity, and Chaitanya ate it. This occurred three times, after which the Brahmin reportedly had a vision that the child was himself the deity to which he was worshipping and offering the prepared food. He was also known to be mischievous, teasing the local girls at the riverbanks, hiding their clothes, putting seeds in their hair, and jokingly asking them to marry him. He would also steal milk and rice from his neighbors, often evading capture.

== Education ==
Chaitanya began his formal education at the age of five in a local ṭol (seminary). He proved to be a child prodigy, mastering Sanskrit grammar and Navya-nyāya (neo-logic) with remarkable speed. During the early educational years, when he was roughly six to ten years old, his older brother Viśvarūpa took saṃnyāsa and left home. For a period of time Chaitanya consoled his grieving parents. Later, around the age of eleven or twelve, his father died, making him assume the responsibilities of the house.

He continued his education under scholars such as Gaṅgādāsa Paṇḍita, Sudarśana, and Viṣṇupāda. One legend states that he wrote an exceptionally brilliant commentary on logic. However, when he realized his work was so superior that it would eclipse the reputation of his friend Raghunātha Śiromaṇi, he threw the manuscript into the Ganges. At age sixteen Chaitanya established his own ṭol (seminary) at the home of Mukunda Sañjaya. He quickly became a sought-after teacher in Navadvipa, becoming known as "Nīmai Paṇḍita". Shortly after beginning his teaching career Caitanya fell in love with Lakṣmīpriyā, daughter of a Navadvīpa brāhmaṇa named Vallabhācārya (not to be confused with Vallabhācārya the founder of the Puṣṭimārga), at first sight, subsequently marrying her.

As time went on, his intellectual confidence turned into scholarly pride. Chaitanya then embarked on a tour of East Bengal to earn wealth through teaching and debate. He was known to be talkative and flippant, defeating senior scholars in debates and picking flaws in their logic. He is said to have once defeated Keśava Bhaṭṭa of the Nimbārka school in a debate on Sanskrit prosody, an example of his "superhuman erudition". While he was away from home, his wife Lakṣmīpriyā died from a snakebite. Upon his return he was deeply affected by the loss. On his mother's request, he married again to Viṣṇupriyā, daughter and only child of the court scholar Sanātana Miśra.

== The Sankirtan movement ==
Around 1508-1509 he travelled to Gaya to perform śrāddha (funeral rites) for his father. There he met the ascetic Īśvara Purī, and requested to get initiated by him. He was given the ten-syllable Gopāla Mantra (Note: According to some accounts, specifically the Oriya Caitanya Bhāgavata by Īśvara Dāsa, the mantra is given as: "kliṅga kṛṣṇāya govindāya gopījana-vallabhāya namaḥ" Another source identifies the specific ten-syllable version as "gopījana-vallabhāya namaḥ") and experienced a spiritual awakening. He then returned to Navadvipa. He is said to have abandoned his scholarly pride for "rapturous devotion to Krishna". He would frequently fall into trances, crying out for God, and losing external consciousness. He closed his school and dedicated himself to saṃkīrtana (congregational chanting). Along with his associates Nityānanda and Advaita Ācārya, he engaged in ecstatic public worship/chanting. This movement faced opposition from the local Muslim ruler, the Chand Kazi. The ruler banned the congregational chanting. Chaitanya responded by leading a peaceful protest of thousands to the ruler's house, leading to the ruler converting to his cause.

At the age of twenty-four, Chaitanya decided to enter the renounced order of life (saṃnyāsa) to spread his message. He felt this would allow him to overcome the opposition of those who viewed him merely as a local scholar. In 1510 he received the monastic vows of renunciation from his guru Keśava Bhāratī at Katwa. He was given the name "Śrī Kṛṣṇa Caitanya". At his mother's request he decided to make Jagannatha Puri in Odisha his headquarters. He traveled there with a few companions, stopping at the home of Advaita Ācārya in Shantipur along the way. According to the tradition, shortly after arriving in Puri, Chaitanya converted monistic scholar Sārvabhauma Bhaṭṭācārya to his devotional philosophy. He then spent approximately two years traveling extensively through the southern part of India. There he met Rāmānanda Rāya and discussed the highest stages of Rādhā-bhāva. Upon returning to Puri in 1512, King Pratāparudra arranged for Chaitanya to reside in a secluded room within the house of Kāśī Miśra, known as the Gambhīra, where he would spend most of his remaining years.

According to the tradition, Chaitanya initially declined to meet King Pratāparudra, but later granted the king a personal interview after seeing the king sweeping the road during the Rathayātrā festival. Chaitanya established a tradition of personally sweeping and washing the Gundicha temple with pitchers of water before the Rathayātrā festival. In 1514 Chaitanya set out for Vrindavan, travelling first through Bengal. At the village of Ramakeli, he met two brothers who were high-ranking ministers for the Muslim Sultan Husain Shah. He accepted them as his disciples and renamed them Rūpa and Sanātana. In 1515, Chaitanya traveled to Vrindavan and spent months visiting lost holy sites associated with Krishna. On his return journey from Vrindavan in 1516, he met Rupa Goswami in Prayag and Sanatan Goswami in Varanasi. He instructed them to restore Vrindavan and write authoritative scriptures. While in Varanasi he debated Prakashanand Saraswati and converted him and his followers to the sankirtan movement.

=== Final years ===
Chaitanya remained permanently in Puri for about 18 years from his return in 1516 to his death in 1533. There he was attended to by his associates Svarupa Damodara and Ramananda Raya. He spent the last two decades of his life with ecstatic seizures yearning for Kr̥ṣṇa and his consorts, mainly Rādhā, intensified. Biographers record miraculous physical transformations during these trances. Descriptions include Chaitanya's limbs receding into his body or his joints becoming unusually elongated. A famous incident from this period of his life includes Chaitanya mistaking the sea for the Yamuna River, jumping in, and subsequently falling into a deep trance for multiple hours before being recovered in a net by a fisherman. He died in c. 1528-1534.

== Teachings ==
The Śikṣāṣṭaka is the only work accepted to be composed by Caitanya. The poem expounds upon the subjects of harināmajapa, saṁkīrtana, the relationship between individual souls and Kr̥ṣṇa, devotional submission to Kr̥ṣṇa, and Caitanya's personal virahabhakti. Sri Caitanya founded the great Gauḍīya Vaiṣṇava sect.

According to Murari Gupta, one of Caitanya's close associates, Caitanya taught that kirtana (chanting God's name) is the most effective spiritual practice in the Kali Age. He first gathered the community for kirtana in Srivasa's courtyard. Caitanya revealed bhakti as the primary means to approach Krishna, and he appointed the Goswamis, such as Srinivasa Acarya and Narottama Dasa, to gather and compose texts explaining this devotion.

According to Dinesh Chandra Sen's analysis, Caitanya's teaching is centered on prema (divine love), described in Vaishnava texts as progressing through different spiritual phases. Sen also states that Caitanya integrated compassionate service and taught that devotion to God is higher than social distinctions, quoting Caitanya's words "The moment that you say you love God, all human beings will be your brethren; there will be no Brahmin, no Sudra".

== Biographies ==
Works on Chaitanya:

- Śrī Kṛṣṇa Caitanya Caritāmṛtam: is said to be composed around 1513 CE by Murari Gupta (also known as Murari Guptera Kadacha) but its authenticity is open to serious doubt, because it narrates later events including the death of Chaitanya Mahaprabhu. Because of which either the attributed date is wrong or the text went through interpolations and fabrications overtime by anonymous men Its oldest known manuscript is from 1896 , which is an edited version of 2 manuscripts, one from Dhaka and one from Vrindavan, the account of the sources are unknown. It portrays him as a divine incarnation of Lord Vishnu.
- Chaitanya Bhagavata (c. 1535 or 1546–1550; Bengali): By Vrindavana Dasa Thakura. Three parts: Adi-Khanda, Mādhya-Khanda, and Antya-Khanda. Chaitanya's earlier life, activities, early movement in Navadwip.
- Krsna-Caitanya-caritra-mahakavya (c. 1535): By Kavi Karnapura (Paramanand Sen).
- Caitanya-caritāmṛta-kavya (c. 1542 – late 1500s; Sanskrit): By Kavi Karnapura (Paramanand Sen). A long biographical poem on Chaitanya's life and acts, though its date is disputed and so is its authorship, some dating it to end of 17th century.
- Caitanya-caritāmṛta (c. 1557 or 1580 or 1615; Bengali): By Krishnadasa Kaviraja. Three parts: Adi-lila, Madhya-lila, and Antya-lila. Massive authoritative composition of Chaitanya's biography and teachings. According to Manring, he draws liberally from previous writers (poets, theologians and biographers) as he deems correct, omitting Kavi Karnapura's works perceived as threatening Rupa's authority.
- Caitanya-Mangala (c. 1560 or late 1500s; Bengali): By Jayananda. Nine parts: Adikhanda, Nadiyakhanda, Vairagyakhanda, Sannyaskhanda, Utkalkhanda, Prakashkhanda, Tirthakhanda, Vijaykhanda, and Uttarkhanda. Biographical poem in the form of a narrative play focused on Chaitanya's godly image. It is the only work in which his death is mentioned. Introduction mentions several previous biographers, of whom only Vrindavan is known. Written for the common people, it is explicitly different from devotional biographies like Caitanya-caritāmṛta and Chaitanya Mangala by giving us an account of natural death of Chaitanya rather than complete silence, which contradicts Chaitanya Mangala which tells us that he miraculously disappeared into Jagannath. It contains almost no miracle.
- Chaitanya Mangala (c. 1560–66 or 1575): By Lochana Dasa (a.k.a. Trilocan Dasa). Four parts: Sutrakhanda, Adikhanda, Madhyakhanda, and Antyakhanda. A narrative play depicting Chaitanya's childhood activities and his human side without highlighting any divine matters to make it popular. Influenced by Murari Gupta's Krsna-Caitanya-Caritamrta and Vrindavana Dasa Thakura's Chaitanya Bhagavata as well as the Mahabharata and different Puranas.
- Chaitanya-chandrodaya-kaumudi (Bengali): By Premadas (Purushottam Mishra). A verse adaptation to Kavi Karnapura's Caitanya-candrodaya-natakam drama.
- Gaura-ganoddesha-dipika (c. 1576): By Kavi Karnapura (Paramanand Sen).
- Chaitanya-samhita (Bengali): By Bhagirath Bandhu. Work follows the tradition of agama or tantric texts in its presentation as a story told by Shiva to his spouse.
- Chaitanya-vilasa (c. 1500s; Odia): By Madhava Dasa. A short poetical work in ten sections dealing with the life of Chaitanya. The poet probably came into contact with the saint when the latter came to Puri.
- Gauranga-vijay (c. 1500s): By Chundamani dasa. Biographical epic, believed to have been written in three volumes, only part of the first volume still exists. It contains some information about Chaitanya, Nityananda and Madhavendra Puri not found elsewhere.
- Sriman-mahaprabhor-asta-kaliya-lila-smarana-mangala-stotram (c. late 1600s; Sanskrit): By Visvanatha Chakravarti. Eleven sutras (seed verses) describing the eternal eight-fold daily pastimes of the fair-complexioned Lord.
- Sri Gauranga-Lilamrta (c. late 1600s – 1700s; Bengali): By Krishna Dasa (disciple of Visvanatha Chakravarti). Expounded on his guru's eleven sutras, often quoting verses from Vrindavana Dasa Thakura's Chaitanya Bhagavata, plus songs by Narahari Ghanashyama (author of Bhakti-Ratnakara) and Lochana Dasa (author of Chaitanya-Mangala).
- Caitanya-upanisad: A book that is a part of the Atharvaveda which offers overwhelming evidence of Chaitanya's identity as the Supreme Lord and Yuga Avatara.
- Sri Caitanya-caranamrta Bhasva (1887): By Srila Bhaktivinoda Thakura. Commentary on an original handwritten manuscript of the Caitanya-upanisad from one pandita, Madhusudana Maharaja, of Sambala-Pura.
- Amrita-pravaha-bhashya (c. late 1800s – early 1900s; Sanskrit): By Bhaktivinoda Thakur. Commentary on Caitanya-upanisad.
- Anubhāsya (1915): By Bhaktisiddhanta Sarasvati. Commentary on Krishnadasa Kaviraja's Caitanya-caritāmṛta
- Śrī Caitanya-caritāmṛta (1974; English): By A. C. Bhaktivedanta Swami in English with original Bengali and Sanskrit. Commentary on Krishnadasa Kaviraja's Caitanya-caritāmṛta, based on Bhaktivinoda Thakur's Amrita-pravaha-bhashya and Bhaktisiddhanta Sarasvati's Anubhāsya commentaries.
- Krishna-Caitanya, His Life and His Teachings (2014; English; ISBN 978-91-981318-1-9): By Walther Eidlitz, originally written in German - Kṛṣṇa-Caitanya: sein Leben und seine Lehre, and published by Stockholm University, 1968, as a part of the scientific series "Stockholm studies in comparative religion".

== Cultural legacy ==
The cultural legacy of Chaitanya is defined by a socio-religious revival that reshaped the literary theological, and social landscape of Eastern India and beyond. Though he left only eight verses in writing, the movement he inspired produced an array of philosophical and aesthetic literature.

Noted Bengali biographical film on Chaitanya, Nilachaley Mahaprabhu (1957), was directed by Kartik Chattopadhyay (1912–1989). A Bengali film based on Chaitanya's demise, Lawho Gouranger Naam Rey (2025), is directed by Srijit Mukherji.

In 2026, the Bhaktivedanta International Centre of Excellence for Chaitanya Vaishnava Studies was established at the University of Calcutta in collaboration with the Bhaktivedanta Research Center to promote academic research on Chaitanya Mahaprabhu, his teachings and the Chaitanya Vaishnava tradition.

The university's Department of Sanskrit and offers academic programmes, including certificate and diploma courses, as well as opportunities for research. Its activities include the study of texts and manuscripts associated with Chaitanya and the Vaishnava tradition, including the Chaitanya Charitamrita, Chaitanya Bhagavata, Bhagavad Gita and Bhagavata Purana. The centre also supports academic study of Chaitanya's religious, social and educational contributions and the study of Chaitanya Vaishnavism as an academic field.

== Image gallery ==
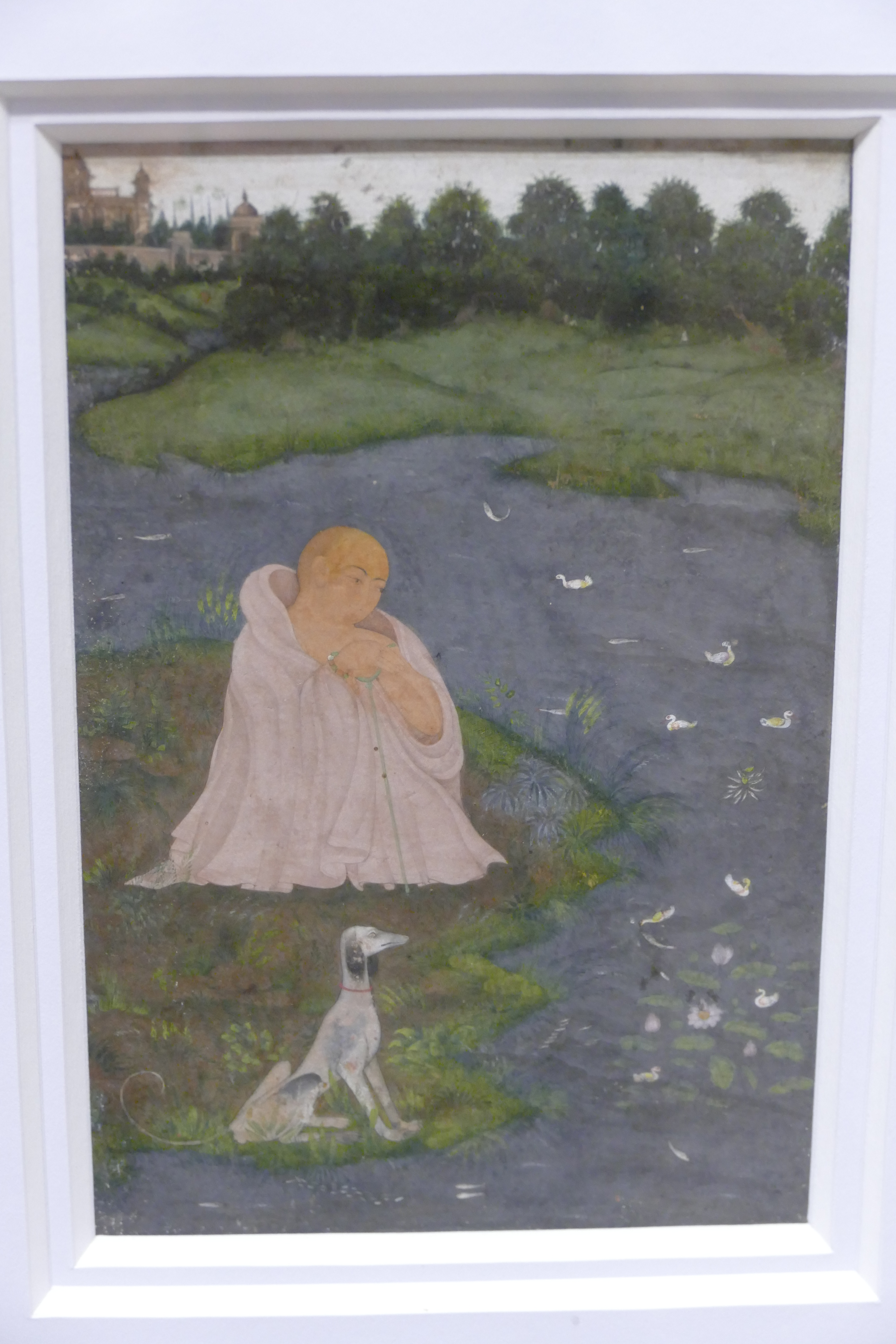
Chaitanya with a dog, Murshidabad, 19th century CE

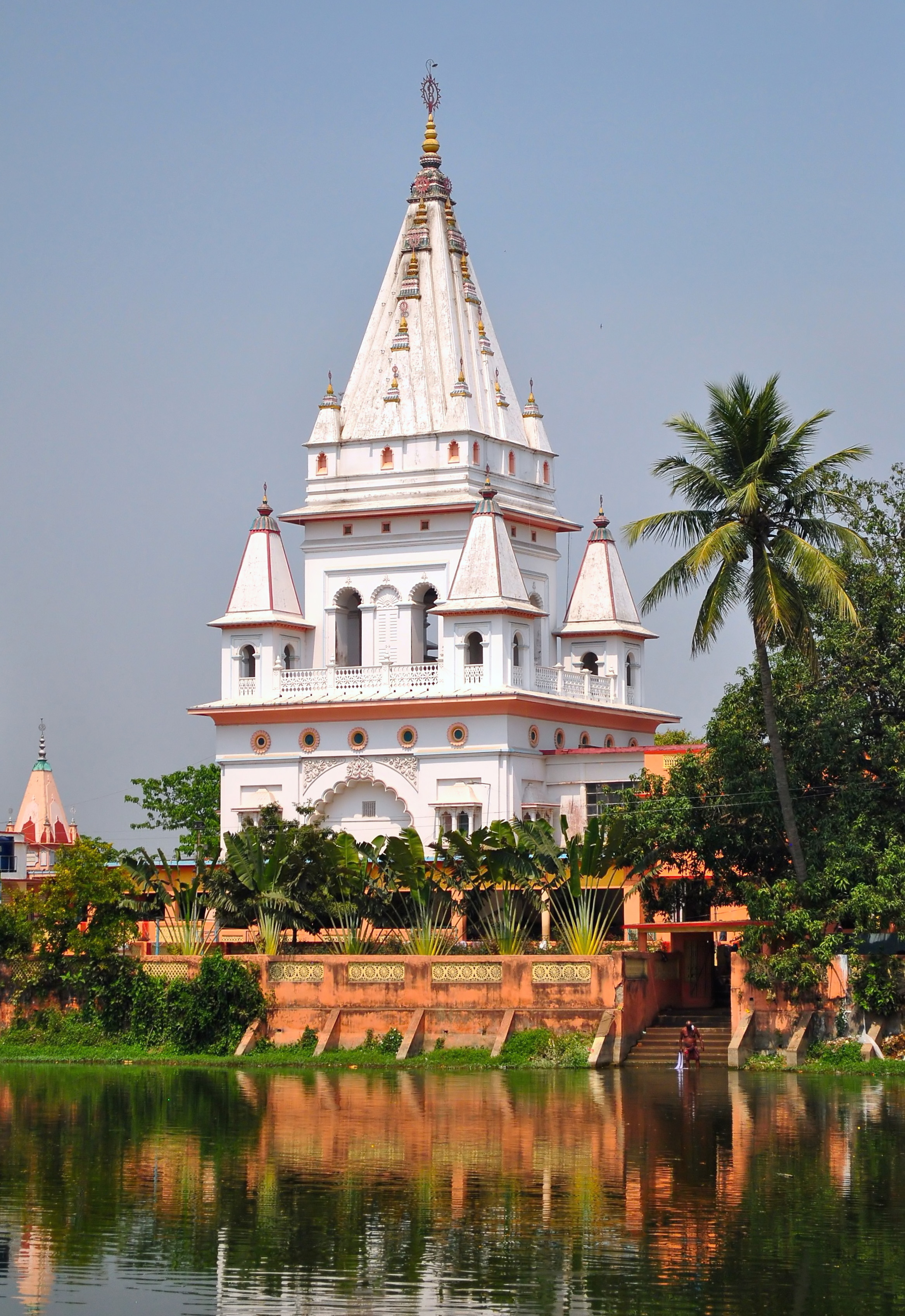
Yogapith temple at Chaitanya Mahaprabhu's birthsite established in the 1880s by Bhaktivinoda Thakur in Mayapur, West Bengal

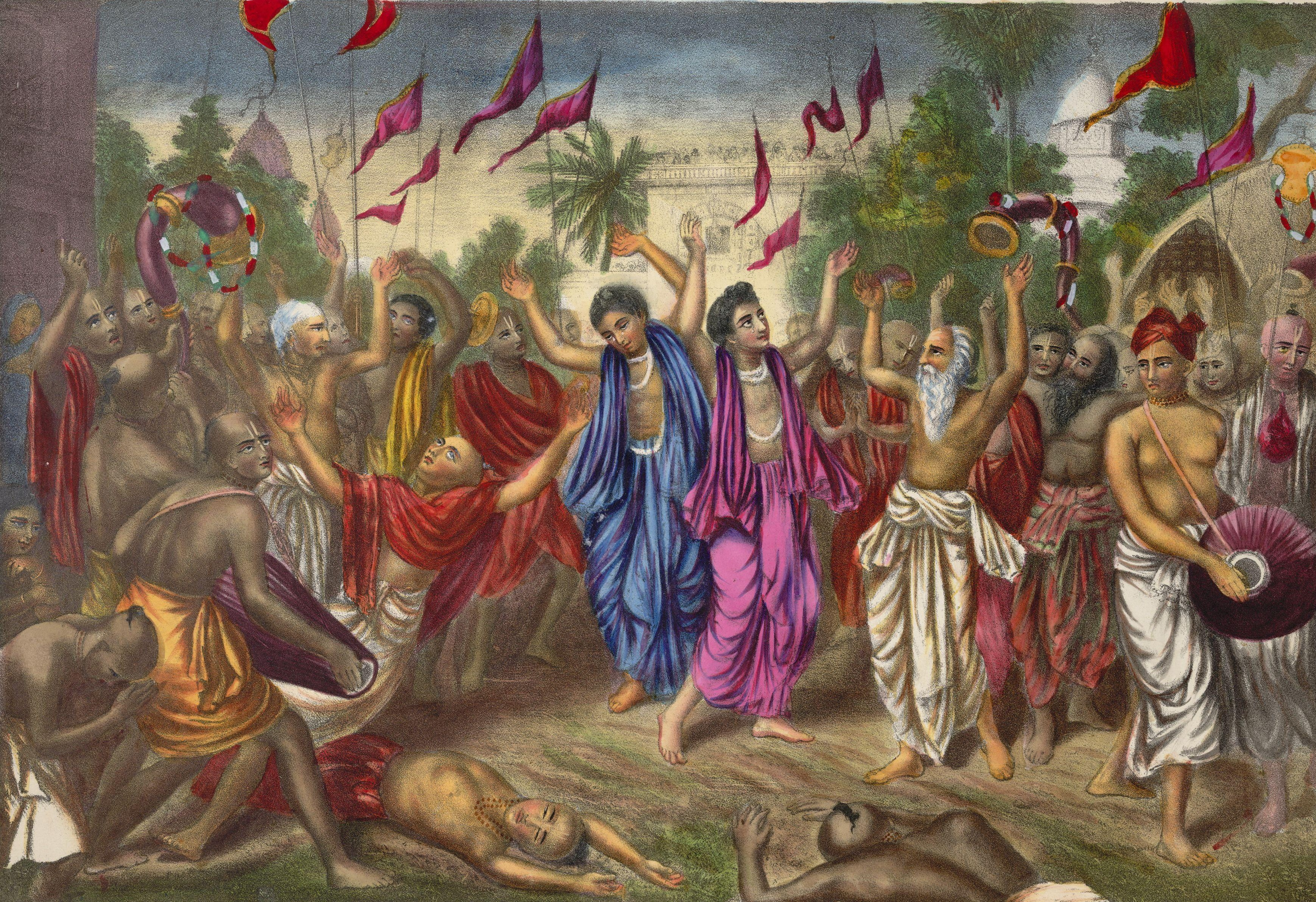
Nineteenth century lithograph by Calcutta Art Studio of Caitanya and Nityānanda performing a kirtan in the streets of Nabadwip, Bengal.

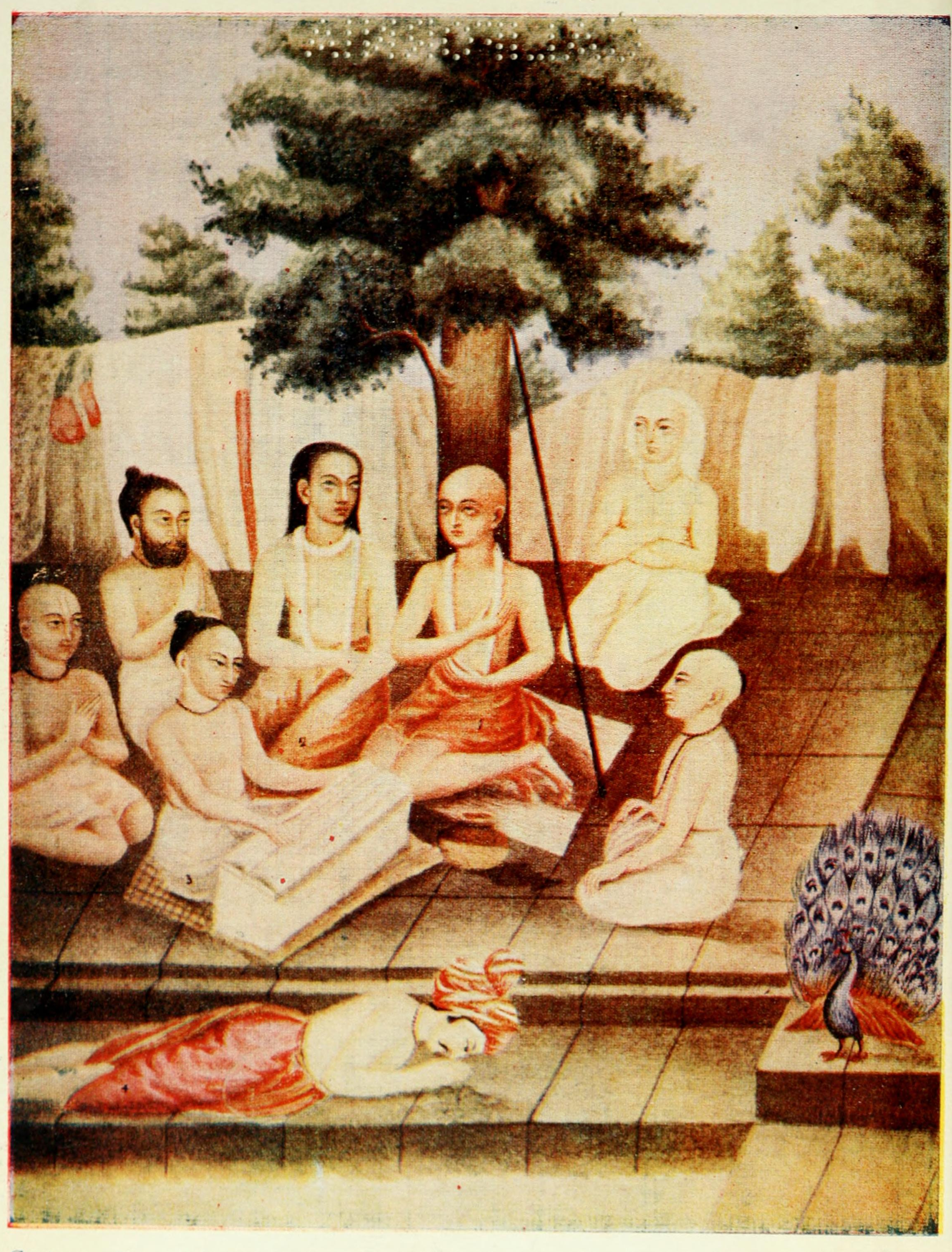
Pratap Rudra bowing to Chaitanya, an early 20th century print copy of a painting held by the family of Maharaja Nandakumar, Zamindars of Kunjaghata

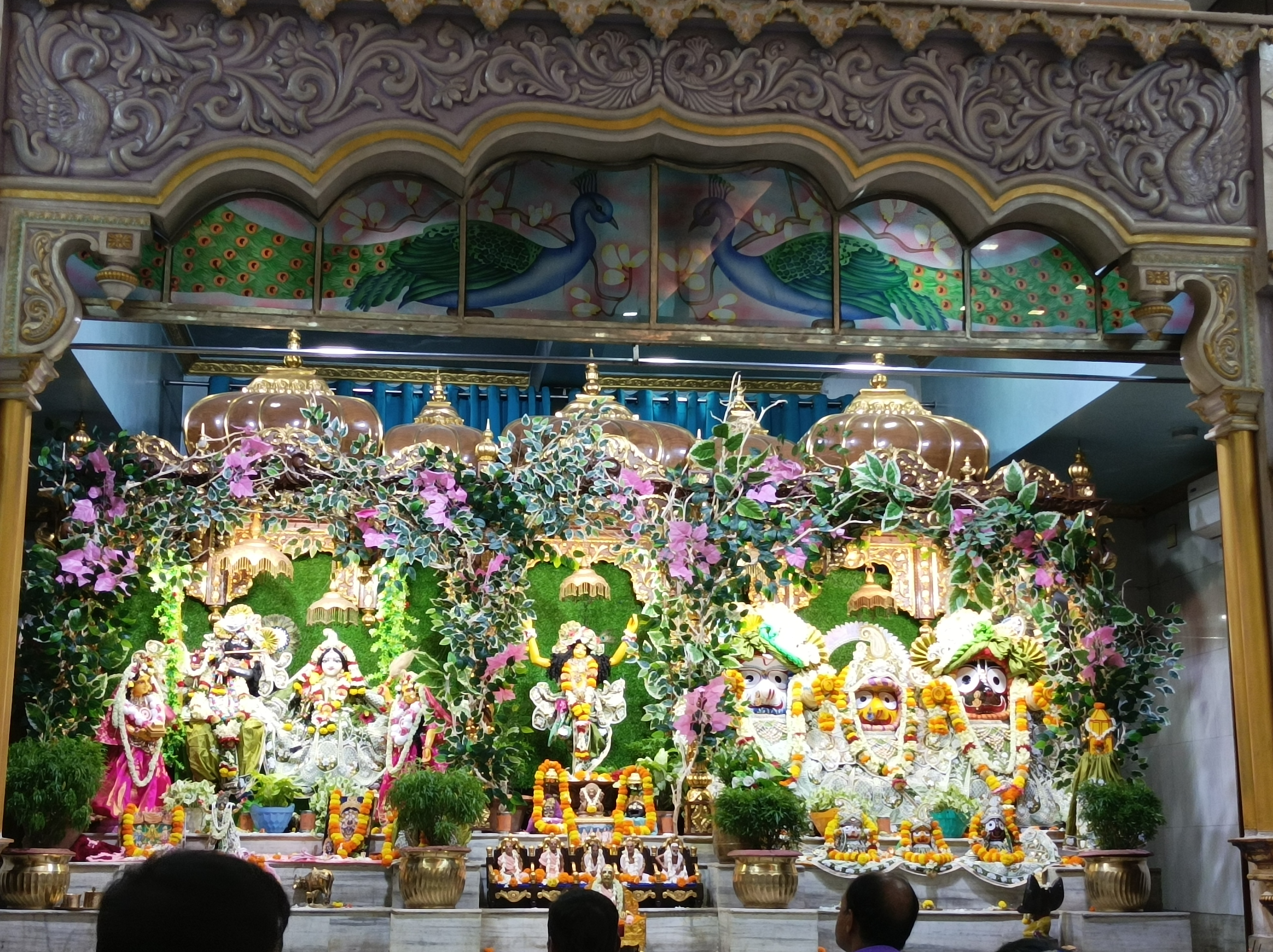
Deities of Sri Sri Radha Madhava, Jagannath, Balarama, Subhadra and Chaitanya Mahaprabhu (in middle), at the ISKCON Durgapur Temple.

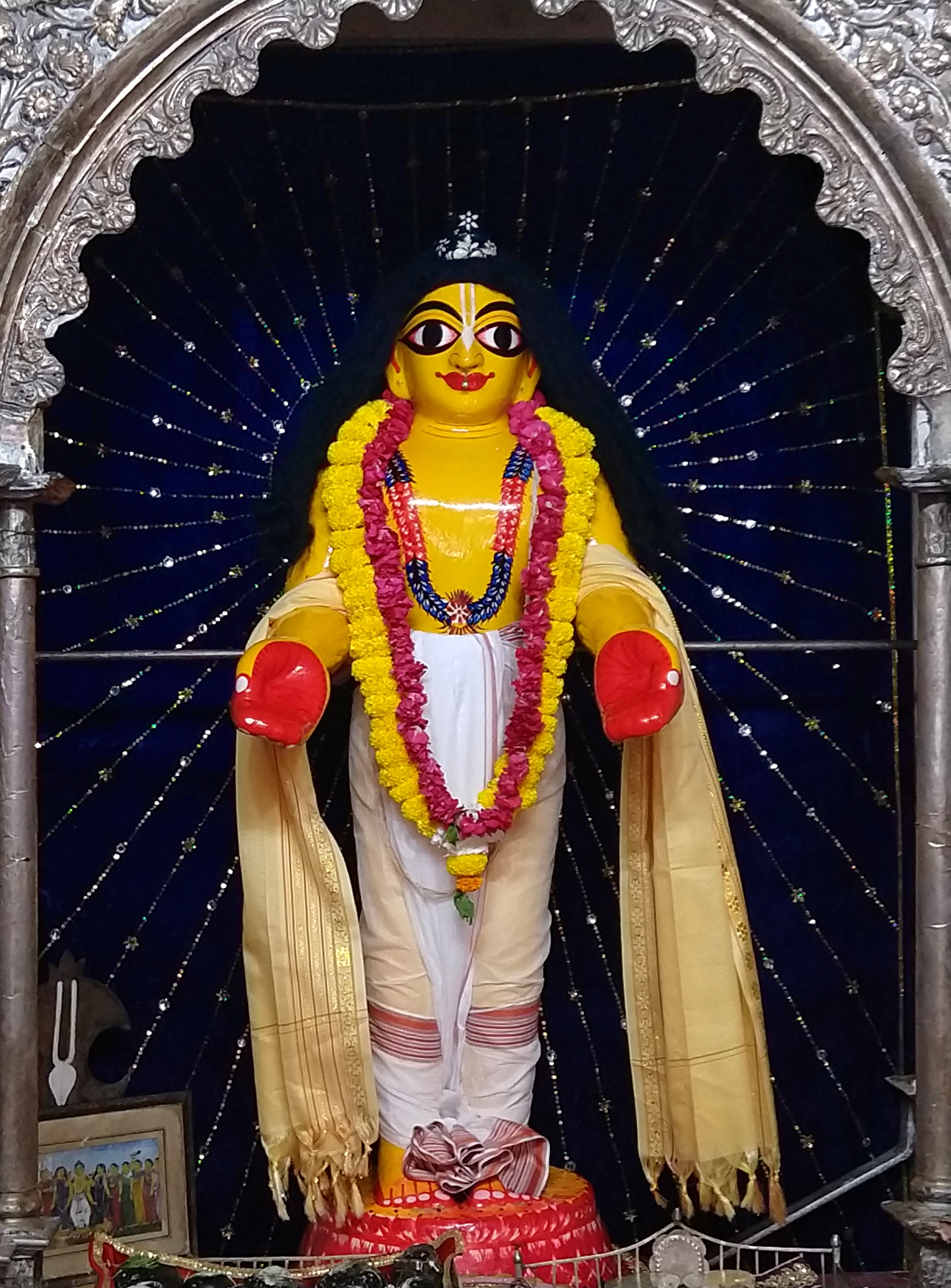
Wooden murti of Chaitanya Mahaprabhu as Dhāmeśvara, Nabadwip

== Sources ==
=== Books and book chapters ===
- Bryant, Edwin F., ed. (2007). Krishna: A Sourcebook. New York: Oxford University Press. ISBN 978-0-19-514891-6.
- Carney, Gerald T. (2020). "Baba Premananda Bharati: His trajectory into and through Bengal Vaiṣṇavism to the West". In Sardella, Ferdinando; Wong, Lucian (eds.). The Legacy of Vaiṣṇavism in Colonial Bengal. Routledge Hindu Studies Series. Milton, Oxon; New York: Routledge. pp. 135–160. ISBN 978-1-138-56179-3.
- Dasa, Satyanarayana (2007). "The Six Sandharbhas of Jiva Gosvami". Krishna: A Sourcebook (PDF). Oxford University Press. pp. 373–408. ISBN 978-0-19-514891-6.
- Delmonico, Neal (2007). "Chaitanya Vaishnavism and the Holy Names". Krishna: A Sourcebook (PDF). Oxford University Press. pp. 549–575. ISBN 978-0-19-514891-6.
- Gupta, Ravi M. (2007). The Caitanya Vaisnava Vedanta of Jiva Gosvami: When Knowledge Meets Devotion (PDF). Routledge. ISBN 978-0-415-40548-5.
- Manring, Rebecca J. (2005). "Chapter 2: Advaita Acarya: A New Imminence". Reconstructing Tradition: Advaita Ācārya and Gauḍīya Vaiṣṇavism at the Cusp of the Twentieth Century. New York: Columbia University Press. ISBN 0-231-12954-8.
- Mukherjee, Sujit (1999). A Dictionary of Indian Literature: Volume One, Beginnings-1850. New Delhi: Orient Longman. ISBN 81-250-1453-5.
- Nair, K. K. (2007). Sages Through Ages: Volume II: India's Heritage. AuthorHouse. ISBN 978-1-4208-7802-8.
- Sarkar, Jadunath (1913). Chaitanya's Pilgrimages and Teachings - From his contemporary Bengali biography the Chaitanya-charit-amrita: Madhya-lila. Calcutta: Brahmo Mission Press.
- Sarma, Mamoni (2015). "Chapter 14". History of Vaishnavite Cultures in Assam and Bengal: A Comparative Study. pp. 253–255. hdl:10603/127571. Archived (PDF) from the original on 26 June 2020. "Note, Sarma Mamoni is a researcher at Gauhati University under Chakraborty Amalendu."
- Sen, Dinesh Chandra (1922). Chaitanya and His Age. Robarts - University of Toronto. Calcutta, University of Calcutta.
- Sherbow, Paul H. (2004). "Chapter 9: A.C. Bhaktivedanta Swami's Preaching in the Context of Gaudiya Vaishnavism". In Bryant, Edwin F.; Ekstrand, Maria L. (eds.). The Hare Krishna Movement: The Postcharismatic Fate of a Religious Transplant. New York: Columbia University Press. ISBN 0-231-12256-X.
- Stewart, Tony K. (1 March 2010). The Final Word: The Caitanya Caritamrita and the Grammar of Religious Tradition. Oxford University Press. doi:10.1093/acprof:oso/9780195392722.001.0001. ISBN 978-0-19-539272-2.
- Stewart, Tony K. (2014). "Caitanya". Oxford Bibliographies Online in Hinduism.
- Sur, Ansu; Goswami, Abhijit (1999). Bengali Film Directory. Nandan, West Bengal Film Centre. p. 96.

=== Encyclopedias and reference works ===
- Stewart, Tony K. (2012). "Chaitanya, Sri". In Sirajul Islam; Miah, Sajahan; Khanam, Mahfuza; Ahmed, Sabbir (eds.). Banglapedia: the National Encyclopedia of Bangladesh (Online ed.). Dhaka, Bangladesh: Banglapedia Trust, Asiatic Society of Bangladesh. ISBN 984-32-0576-6. OCLC 52727562. OL 30677644M.
- Valpey, Kenneth (2018). "Caitanya". In Jacobsen, Knut A.; Basu, Helene; Malinar, Angelika; Narayanan, Vasudha (eds.). Brill's Encyclopedia of Hinduism Online. Calcutta: Brill.

=== Theses ===
- Basu, Nabanita (2013). Chaitanya-Jibanisahitya: Tulanatmak Bishleshan [Chaitanya biographical literature: A comparative analysis] (PhD thesis) (in Bengali). Kalyani, West Bengal: University of Kalyani.
- Das, Munmun (2021). বাংলা কথাসাহিত্যে চৈতন্য ব্যক্তিত্ব ও প্রভাবের নববীক্ষণ [A New Study of Chaitanya's Personality and Influence in Bengali Fiction] (PhD thesis) (in Bengali). Kolkata: Jadavpur University.
- Gahan, Pradipta Kumar (2003). Impact of Chaitanya Movement on the Socio-Religious Life of Orissa (PhD thesis). Bhubaneswar: Utkal University.
- Mishra, Shuchi (2007). श्रीकृष्ण चैतन्य एवं तत्कालीन बंग समाज (1485-1533) [Sri Krishna Chaitanya and Contemporary Bengali Society (1485-1533)] (PhD thesis) (in Hindi). Jaunpur: Veer Bahadur Singh Purvanchal University.
- Sethy, Minakshi (2015). The Concept of Bhakti in the Philosophy of Sri Chaitanya (PhD thesis). Bhubaneswar: Utkal University.

=== News articles ===
- Chakraborty, Shamayita (16 July 2021). "Parambrata to Play Gourango in Srijit's Next; Will Also Sing in the Film". The Times of India. Archived from the original on 31 March 2022.

=== Websites and online articles ===
- "Sri Chaitanya Mahaprabhu". SCSMath.com. Archived from the original on 28 December 2017.

== See also ==
- Vrindavan
- Gauranga
- Jagannath Temple (Puri)
- Pancha Tattva (Vaishnavism)
- Prabhupāda
