= Bijoy Krishna Goswami =

Hindu reformer and religious figure (1841–1899)

Śrī Bijoy Krishna Goswami
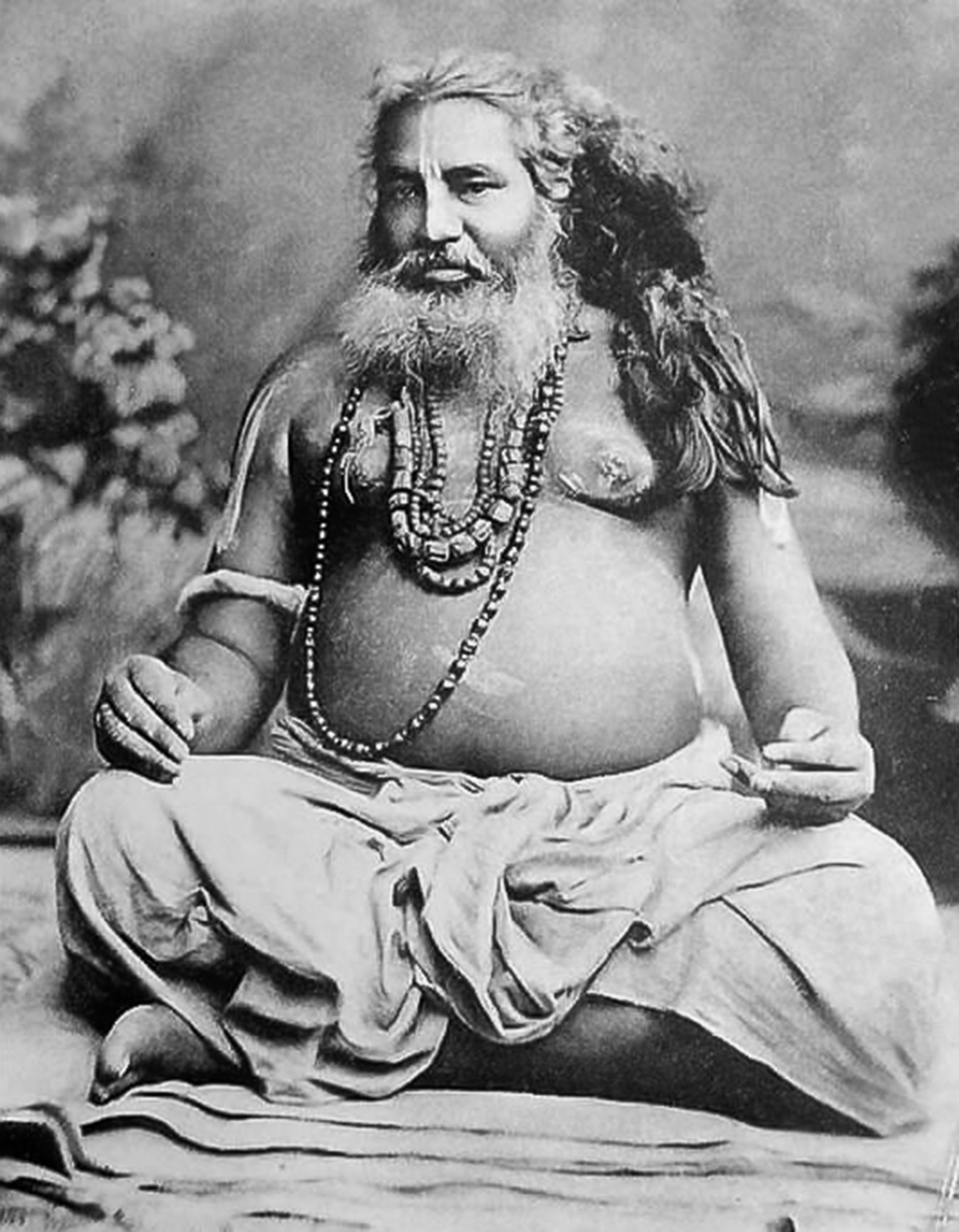

Personal life
- Born: Bijoy Krishna Goswami; 2 August 1841 santipur village, Nadia district, British India
- Died: 4 June 1899 (aged 57) Puri, British India
- Parents: Ananda Kishore Goswami (father); Swarnamoyee Devi (mother)
- Known for: Expounded Gaudiya Vaishnavism, Bhakti yoga
- Other names: Jatia Baba, Achyutananda Paramahamsa, Gosaiji

Religious life
- Religion: Hinduism
- Philosophy: Bhakti yoga, Achintya Bheda Abheda

Religious career
- Teacher: Brahmananda Paramahamsa (mantra guru)

Bijoy Krishna Goswami (IAST: Vijaya-kṛṣṇa Gosvāmī; 2 August 1841 – 4 June 1899), also known by the honorific Gosaiji, was a Hindu social reformer and religious figure in India during the British period.

Brahmo Samaj was started at Calcutta on 20 August 1828 by Raja Ram Mohan Roy and Debendranath Tagore as a reformation of the prevailing tradition of the times (specifically Kulin practices). From the Brahmo Samaj springs Brahmoism, one of the legally recognised religions in India and Bangladesh, reflecting its foundation on reformed spiritual Hinduism with elements of Christian-Islamic faith and practice. Gosaiji's disillusionment from Brahmo Samaj led him to study the Chaitanya Charitamrita, a biography detailing the life and teachings of Sri Chaitanya Mahaprabhu (1486–1534), a Vaisnava saint and founder of the Gaudiya Vaishnava Sampradaya.

Bijoy Krishna Goswami belonged to the "Advaita parivar" (family), as the 10th-generation descendant of Advaita Acharya, personal teacher and associate of Chaitanya Mahaprabhu.

== Prophecy of appearance ==
The prophecy of the birth of Bijoy Krishna Goswami can be found in the text, Chaitanya Mangala written by Lochana Dasa and in the text, Adwaitya Abhisaap written by Paramananda Dasa. It is written by Lochana Dasa and Paramananda Dasa that during his Leela at Nabadwip, Chaitanya Mahaprabhu was travelling towards Vrindavan in ecstasy, Nityananda Prabhu, however, diverted Chaitanya from Vrindavan and took him to Sripad Advaita Acharya's residence, in Shantipur. Chaitanya Mahaprabhu stayed in Shantipur for ten days and then ignoring the tearful eyes of Shantipur's residents and grief-stricken requests from his mother Sachi Devi, he left Shantipur for Jagannath Temple.

Advaita Acharya could not bear the pangs of separation from Mahaprabhu, and in anticipation of parting, Adwaitya Achary cursed Mahaprabhu saying – "You have stayed here for ten days, but in this incarnation, your work will remain incomplete, you have to re-incarnate in my family as my tenth generation."

Gosaiji appeared in Shantipur as a tenth-generation successor of Sripad Adwaitya Acharya.

== Early life ==
Bijoy Krishna Goswami was born on 2 August 1841 Shikarpur (Nadia), in a colocasia thicket, to Ananda Kishore Goswami and Swarnamoyee Devi. Desirous of a child, Ananda Kishore Goswami Prabhu travelled from Shantipur to Jagannath Temple, Puri, performing dandavat prostration all along the way. This method of travelling took him one and a half-year to reach Puri. The night he arrived at the Jagannath Temple, Puri, it is believed that he dreamt of Jagannath Swami, who promised him that he would take birth as his son. Thus, assured Ananda Kishore Goswami returned home to Shantipur.

The family deity worshipped in the Goswami household was Sri Shyamsundar. Gosaiji later recounted that as an infant, Shyamsundar would appear before him and became his playmate. This sakhyabhāva (the attitude of a friend) with Shyamsundar would remain with Gosaiji throughout in his life.

Ananda Kishore Goswami died on 1844 AD, entering into maha bhava samadhi while reciting the Srimad Bhagavatam; Gosaiji was then only three years old. Goswamiji started his academic life in 1850 AD, enrolling in the Bhagwan Sarkar's Sanskrit school at Shikarpur. He also studied Vedanta under the tutelage of Acharya Krishna Gopal Goswami. He later joined the Calcutta Sanskrit College, during this time he married Ramchandra Bhaduri's eldest daughter Yogmaya Devi.

It was a tradition in the Goswami family of becoming hereditary spiritual preceptor of devoted families. In keeping with the culture, Gosaiji once visited the family of a disciple, who begged him for redemption. Gosaiji was shocked; he thought – "How can I provide salvation when I am myself bound to Saṃsāra?"; Gosaiji consequently, left the ancestral tradition of spiritual mentorship, and in the year 1860 AD joined the Calcutta Medical College to pursue a career in medicine. During those times, white supremacy was very much prevalent in British India. Infuriated by the racist comments made by a British professor, Gosaiji organised the first student strike in British India. The mediation of Sri Ishwar Chandra Vidyasagar brought the situation under control, but a disillusioned Gosaiji left his studies at the medical college and instead became a homoeopathy medicine practitioner. During his wanderings as a homoeopathy doctor, Gosaiji's religion fervour grew and under the influence of Acharya Devendra Nath Tagore, he renounced his Hindu heritage and joined the Brahmo Samaj.

== Life as a Brahmo preacher ==
Gosaiji was an Acharya of the Adi Brahmo Samaj by the year 1864. As the Brahmo movement began to spread, there was a clash between the elderly conservative Adi Brahmo Samaj members led by Acharya Devendranath Tagore and the fresh members of the samaj led by Keshub Chandra Sen. As a result, Gosaiji resigned the position of acharya of the Adi Brahmo Samaj and joined Keshub Chandra Sen's new samaj called the Brahmo Samaj of India. As a member of the new Brahmo Samaj, Gosaiji took upon the duties of education of women and the abolition of child marriage. During this time he worked with Iswarchandra Vidyasagar to achieve the prohibition of child marriage. Aiming to educate the women of India, he started contributing to Bengali magazines like Bamabodhini (edited by Umesh Chandra Dutta), Tattwabodhini, Dharmatattwa etc. His writings in Bamabodhini magazine, under the pseudonym "Ashabati" received recognition; these writings were compiled later in a book called "Asahabatir Upakhan".

The year 1874 saw the emergence of the Sankirtan movement in Brahmo Samaj premises, due to the efforts of Gosaiji. Gosaiji composed numerous Brahmo songs during this period. In this period Gosaiji started preaching the Brahmo way of worship throughout India, he visited interior parts of Bihar, Uttar Pradesh, Assam and Punjab.

The years between 1874 and 1878 was trying timee in Gosaiji's life. As a preacher, he walked length and breadth of India, sometimes sustaining himself by only drinking water and eating the mud from river banks. There was a second schism in the Brahmo Samaj in May 1878, when Keshub Chandra Sen married his underage daughter to the prince of Cooch Bihar who was also a minor. Gosaiji, who had spent his life as a Brahmo preacher advocating against child marriage. Subsequently, Brahmo Samaj of India split into Navavidhan Brahmo Samaj led by Keshub Chandra Sen and Sadharan Brahmo Samaj which included Sivnath Shastri, Ananda Mohan Bose, Gosaiji and others. This split in Brahmo Samaj caused deep anguish to Gosaiji. He realised that the Brahmo method of approach towards God-realisation through logic and reasoning was insufficient.

Once while sermonising in a province of Punjab, he was disturbed by lust; disgusted with himself, he decided to commit suicide by drowning himself in the waters of the Ravi. The fateful night when Gosaiji was about to end his life, it is believed that a mahatma appeared before him. The mahatma consoled him by saying that philosophical speculations, logic and reasoning cannot bring about God realisation. One can only realise God by the grace of a God-realised Guru. The mahatma also reassured Gosaiji by saying that his Guru is preordained and will reveal himself when the time comes. Thus encouraged, Gosaiji started searching for his divine preordained Guru.

== Initiation into Ajapa Sadhana ==
Idol of Sri Bijoy Krishna Goswamiji

In his search for a Guru, Gosaiji joined various sects and schools of Hindu spiritualism. He associated with disciplines as diverse as Baul, Kapalik, Kartabhaja etc. He met Sri Ramakrishna Paramahamsa in Dakshineswar during this period on 27 October 1882 AD. On seeing Gosaiji, Sri Ramakrishna remarked, "When the soul soars high in the sky, why to keep the body in a cage?" – The indication was that it was time for Gosaiji to resign from the duty-bound job of a priest of Brahmo Samaj and lead a free life of an ascetic. He also met other saints of that time including Yogiraj Gambhir Nath, Siddha Caitanya Das Babaji of Nabadwip, Siddha Bhagavan Das Babaji of Kalna and Mahatma Trailanga Swami.

Caitanya Das Babaji on being asked by Gosaiji about how to obtain Bhakti became ecstatic and replied - "Gosai, what did you say? You are the purveyor of Bhakti, and you ask how to get Bhakti? Whatever you may do now, I can see the marks of a devout Vaishnavite in you."

None of these mahatmas agreed to become Gosaiji's Guru, they instead stated that his Guru is waiting for the opportune moment to reveal himself.

Gosaiji then met Mahatma Trailanga Swami in Benaras. A fascinating anecdote regarding this meeting was shared later by Gosaiji to his disciples. Gosaiji said that the first meeting with the mahatma left him shocked as Tailanga Swami was worshipping Lord Shiva using his urine as Ganga water. The puritan Gosaiji attempted to leave without meeting the mahatma. However, Trailanga Swami caught up with him and asked him if he wanted initiation. Gosaiji refused to be initiated by the Swami, the mahatma then lifted the able-bodied Gosaiji by the neck and took him to the Ganga and immersed him in the Ganga for three times, and initiated him with three mantras. One for regular repetition, the second for remembrance when he was in trouble and the third, to the astonishment of Gosaiji was the same "Kula-Mantra" (A traditional mantra that passes down from generation to generation in a family). The mahatma revealed that although he had initiated him, he was not his Guru. These mantras would help draw Gosaiji's Guru towards him, shortening his waiting time.

Finally, in the year 1883 AD, Gosaiji arrived at Akash Ganga hill at Gaya, where he ultimately obtained his Guru - Sripad Brahmananda Paramahamsadev. The incidents of the initiation of Gosaiji was later penned down by him in the Bamabodhini magazine where Gosaiji wrote under the pseudonym - Ashabati. Gosaiji writes that he and another yogi was staying at Akash Ganga hill in the ashram of Raghuvar Das Baba. One day when the ashram was empty, the local shepherds reported that a mahatma had arrived at the peak of AkashGanga hill. After a brief introduction, the mahatma revealed that his residence is at Manasarovar near Mount Kailash and he was the Guru, Gosaiji was searching for; taking Gosaiji on his lap, the mahatma initiated him and disappeared. Gosaiji fell unconscious into a state of samadhi that lasted eleven days and Raghuvar Das Baba looked after him during this period. After a brief period of sadhana at the Akash Ganga hill, Gosaiji at the direction of his Guru arrived at Benaras. After completing three days as a Brahmachari, he received Sannyasa from Swami Hariharananda Saraswati in the year 1885 AD. Brahmo Bijoy Krishna Goswami thus made a complete reversal to Hinduism as the monk Achyutananda Saraswati.

== Manifestation as Sadguru ==
=== Return to society as Acharya Bijoy Krishna ===
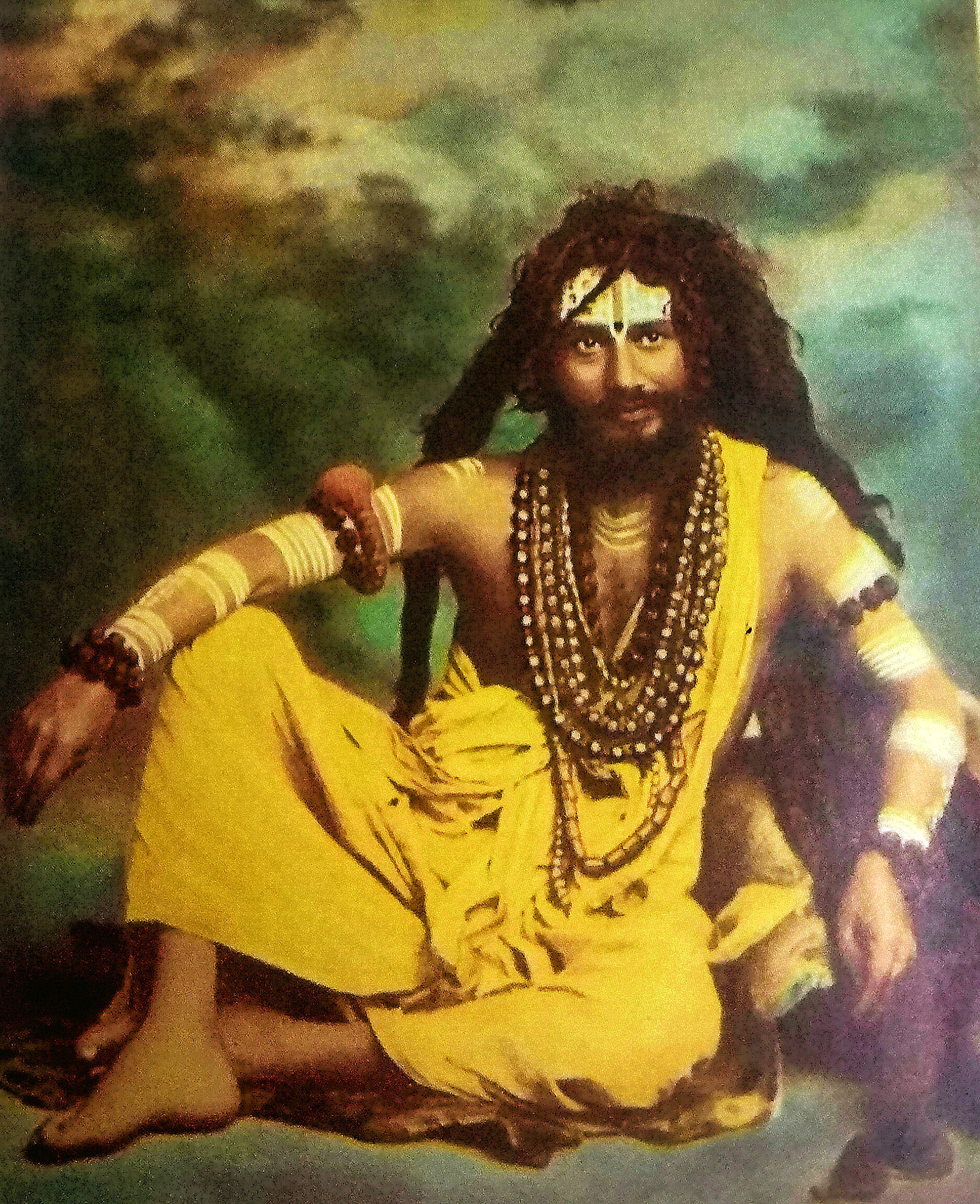
Brahmachari Kuladananda

Gosaiji spent a year of his life as an itinerant monk. According to the memoirs in the book - শ্রী শ্রী সদগুরু সঙ্গ (Shree Shree Sadguru Sanga), Gosaiji started experiencing irritation accompanied by a burning sensation while practising Ajapa Sadhana. This affliction resulted in the singeing of his androgenic hair. Gosaiji asked his Guru to relieve this affliction; Brahmananda Paramahamsadeb consequently asked him to relocate to Jawalamukhi in Himachal Pradesh and continue his practices there. Gosaiji thus travelled from place to place for a year, before his Guru finally asked him to return to society as a householder saint and take up the work of an acharya - preaching the Sri-Naam kirtan and initiating suitable candidates with the Ajapa Naam Sadhana.

Gosaiji thus returned to society and rejoined the Kolkata Brahmo Samaj as an acharya. All the incidents after that from 1886 AD to 1893 AD is recorded by Srimad Kuladananda Brahmachari in his Bengali journal - শ্রী শ্রী সদগুরু সঙ্গ (Shree Shree Sadguru Sanga).

The spiritual experiences and practice of the Ajapa sadhana had changed Gosaiji. He refused to conduct the duties of an acharya following the sectarian Brahmo samaj process, thus resulting in antagonism within the samaj power structure. According to the letters by Gosaiji's disciple Srimat Kiranchand Darvesh (later collected and collated as Darvesh Darshan) during this time there was an assassination attempt on him by Trailokyanath Sanyal (Sadhu Chiranjeeb Sharma) of the Kolkata Brahmo Samaj. The assassination attempt failed, and subsequently, on 24 March 1886 AD, Gosaiji resigned his position from the Kolkata Brahmo Samaj and on the invitation of the members of the Dhaka Brahmo samaj travelled to Dhaka, Bangladesh to take over the duties of an acharya.

Gosaiji's mission as SadGuru began at Dhaka Brahmo Samaj. Brahmachari Kuladananda writes that every day the Brahmo Samaj grounds would be swarming with Hindu, Christian, Muslim and Brahmo devotees who would gather to hear Gosaiji speak. Most of the time, Gosaiji was not able to complete his speeches. Overflowing with divine love he would cry in ecstasy and would get immersed in maha bhava samadhi. Gosaiji's lectures during this time were later collected and published under the title বক্তৃতা ও উপদেশ (Baktritā Ō upadēśa). Gosaiji also wrote books like করুণাকণা (Karuṇākanā) during this period. Shyama Kanta Pandita became the first disciple of Gosaiji, and the number of initiates increased. Gosaiji's also initiated his spiritual successor Srimat Kuladananda Brahmachari in Dhaka during this time.

=== Meeting with Lokenath Brahmachari ===
While a Brahmo Acharya, Gosaiji travelled to Darbhanga, Bihar on 15 May 1887 A.D where he contracted double pneumonia. His condition deteriorated, and physicians lost hope for his life. In this crisis, Gosaiji's disciple Shyamacharan Bakshi approached the mahatma Lokenath Brahmachari and begged him to save Gosaiji's life - Lokenath Brahmachari later revealed that he was Gosaiji's খুল্লতাত (father's younger brother). Kuladananda Brahmachari, in his journal, writes that while travelling from Goalundo Ghat to Darbhanga; Gosaiji's son Yogjeeban Goswami spotted Lokenath Brahmachari drifting in the air towards Darbhanga. Many other disciples of Gosaiji saw Lokenath Brahmachari, Brahmananda Paramahamsa (Gosaiji's Guru) and other anonymous saints appear and disappear spontaneously near the bedside of the ailing Gosaiji. Against all speculations of Gosaiji's demise, Gosaiji regained full health; He arrived at Baradi, Narayanganj on 14 June 1887 A.D to pay his respects to Lokenath Brahmachari.

=== Foundation of Dhaka Gendaria Ashram ===
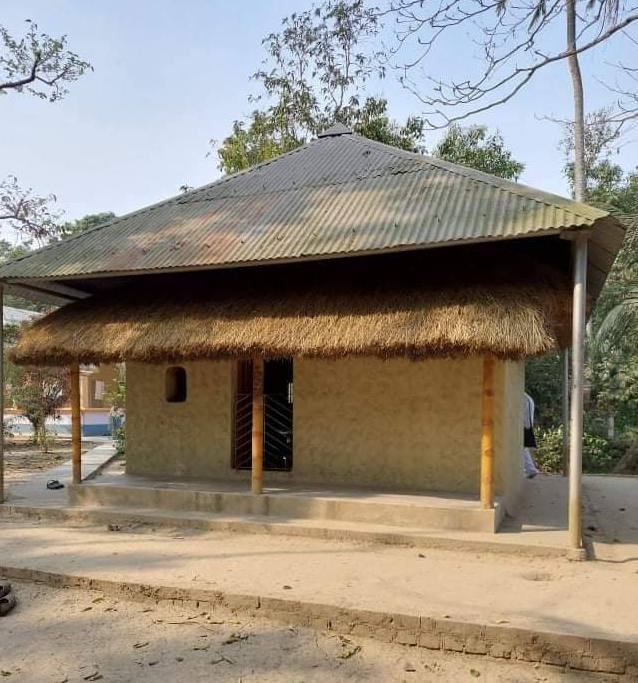
Gendaria Ashram

Gosaiji's non-sectarian method of conducting the Brahmo Samaj resulted in dissent within the Brahmo Samaj. Hardliner Brahmo members began to oppose Gosaiji's induction of Hindu deity worship to the samaj, insistence on Hindu scriptures' infallibility and the importance of a personal guru for spiritual realisation. Gosaiji thus resigned his post of Acharya of the Dhaka Brahmo Samaj on 6 June 1887. After living a year in a rented house at Ekrāmpur – Dhaka District; Gosaiji, with financial help from his devotees and disciples, founded the Dhaka Gendaria Ashram on 31 August 1888, the day coincided with the Janmashtami celebration. Brahmachari Kuladananda described Gendaria Ashram in his diary as a clearing made on the edges of a wild animal infested wilderness. The ashram consisted of a collection of sheds - used as living spaces and kitchen. Gosaiji inscribed the following sermon on the wall of the hut where he resided:

ওঁ শ্রীকৃষ্ণ চৈতন্যায় নমঃ। (Salutations to Sri Krishna Chaitanya Mahaprabhu)

এইছা দিন নাহি রহেগা। (Such a day will not remain)

আত্মপ্রশংসা করিও না। (Do not speak highly of yourself)

পরনিন্দা করিও না। (Do not slander others)

অহিংসা পরম ধর্ম। (Non-violence is a supreme virtue)

সর্ব জীবে দয়া কর। (Be kind to all living beings)

শাস্ত্র ও মহাজনদিগকে বিশ্বাস কর। (Trust the holy scriptures and saints)

শাস্ত্র ও মহাজনের আচারের সঙ্গে যাহা মিলিবে না তাহা বিষবৎ ত্যাগ কর। (Reject as poison anything that does not comply with the behaviour of the holy scriptures and saints)

নাহংকারাৎ পরাে রিপুঃ। (Pride is the greatest foe)

From this stage of his life, Gosaiji followed Akash Vritti (i.e. not making effort to earn, beg or borrow and depend on God's mercy). Haridas Basu, in his book - মহা পাতকীর জীবন সদ্‌গুরু লীলা writes that some resident disciples had no income and depended on the ashram for food and shelter. Describing the divine events that occurred in the ashram, Brahmachari Kuladananda writes - "honey used to drop from the leaves of the mango tree under which Gosaiji used to sit. At times it used to ooze out of his matted hair too. A sublime perfume permeated the ashram area. A cobra used to live in a hole inside his hut. At night Gosaiji remained in samadhi; sometimes, that snake would come out of the hole and climb on top of his matted hair and stay there." In this regard, answering the query of a disciple, Gosaiji said, "When pranayam continues through the central nerve of the spinal cord, it generates a pleasant sound. It spreads its hood near the nose or above the forehead and listens to the sound. At times it draws pleasure by mixing its whistle to that sound. The snake that you see on the neck and head of Lord Shiva is nothing unusual."

== Death ==
Bijoy Krishna Goswami died on 22 Joishtho 1306 BS (4 June 1899 in the Gregorian calendar) in Puri.

His samadhi is currently in a math in Puri, along with his temple. The temple of Bramhachari Kulananda is next to the temple.

== List of major works ==
- যোগ সাধন সন্মন্ধে
- ব্রাহ্মসমাজের বর্ত্তমান অবস্থা এবং আমার জীবনে ব্রাহ্মসমাজের পরীক্ষিত বিষয় [সংস্করণ-২]
- সঙ্গীত-সুধা
- জীবনে ব্রাহ্মসমাজের পরীক্ষিত বিষয় ও কয়েকটীউপদেশ
- আশাবতীর উপখান

== See also ==
- Keshab Chandra Sen
- Debendranath Tagore
- Chaitanya Mahaprabhu
- Advaita Acharya
- Sri Ramakrishna
- Trailanga Swami
