= Gondavalekar Maharaj =

Indian Hindu saint (1845-1913)

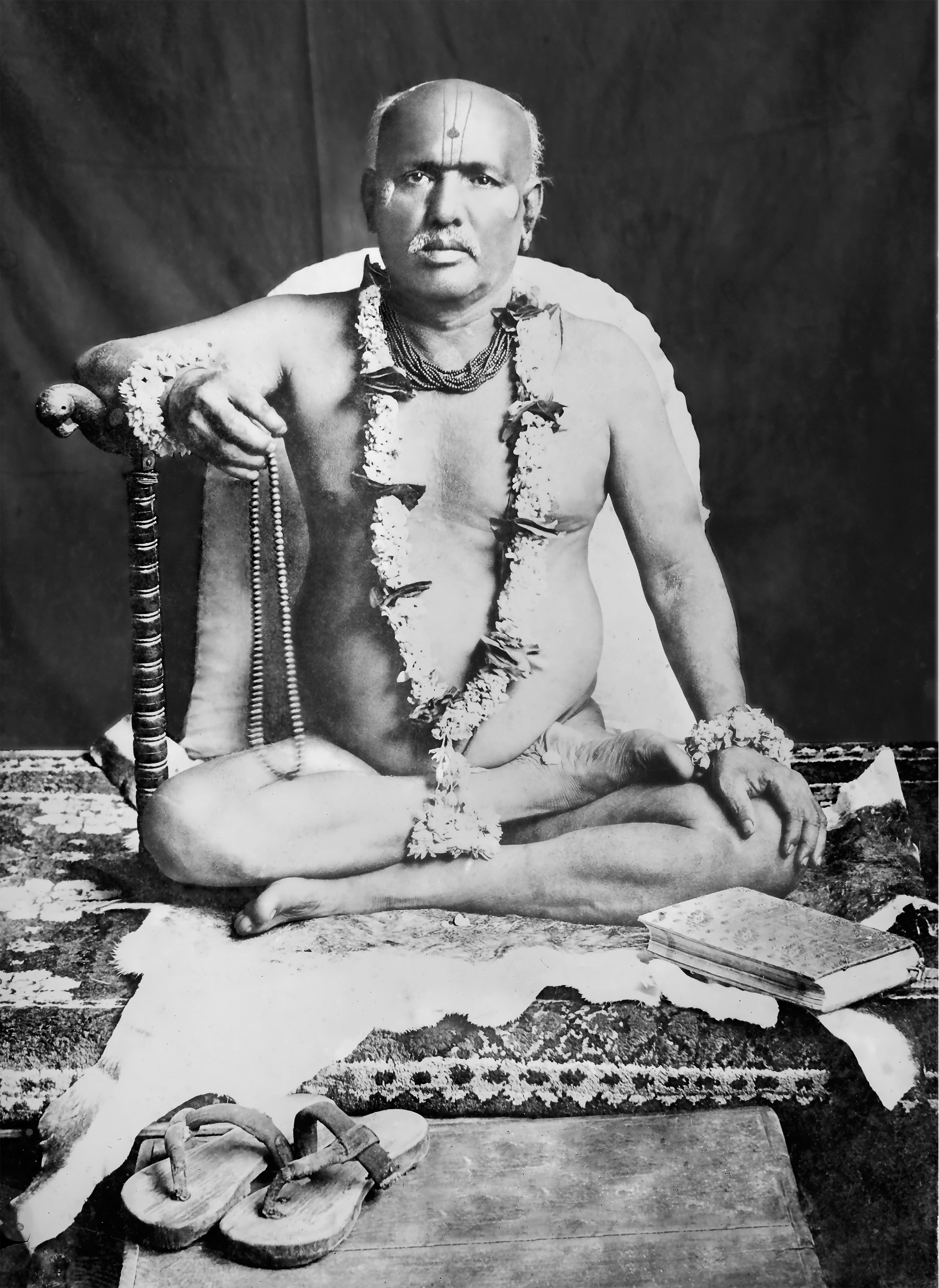
- Gondavalekar Maharaj

Personal life
- Born: Ganpati Raoji Ghugardare (Kulkarni); 19 February 1845 Gondavale Budruk, Satara State, British India
- Died: 22 December 1913 (aged 68) Gondavale Budruk, Satara District, Bombay Presidency, British India

Religious life
- Religion: Hinduism
- Philosophy: Bhakti Yoga, Vaishnavism

Religious career
- Teacher: Tukamai
- Disciples: Brahmanand, Anandsagar, Bhausaheb Ketkar, Dr. Kurtakoti, Pandurangabuva, Tatyasaheb Ketkar, Pralhad Maharaj

Brahmachaitanya (also popularly known as Gondavalekar Maharaj) (19 February 1845 – 22 December 1913) was an Indian Hindu saint and spiritual master. He was a devotee of the Hindu deity Rama, and signed his name as "Brahmachaitanya Ramdasi". He was a disciple of Tukamai. He advocated for japa meditation through recitation of the Trayodaśakṣarī mantra (Sanskrit: त्रयोदशाक्षरी मंत्र, lit. '13-alphabet mantra in Devanagari script'). He promulgated mantra recitation as an effective means to attain spiritual progress and moksha (spiritual liberation).

== Biography ==
=== Early life ===
He was born on 19 February 1845 as Ganpati Ghugardare. He was born into a Deshastha Brahmin family to Raoji and Gitabai Ghugardare. His place of birth was Gondavale Budruk, a small town in present-day Satara District, Maharashtra, India. His parents were devotees of Vitthala, a Hindu deity. Lingopant, his grandfather, held the title of Kulkarni or rural record-keeper of Gondavale during the Maratha regime. Kulkarni was later adopted as the family name.

He memorized the Hindu philosophical scripture, Bhagavad Gita at a very early age. He is believed to have attained enlightenment at a young age.

=== Initiation ===
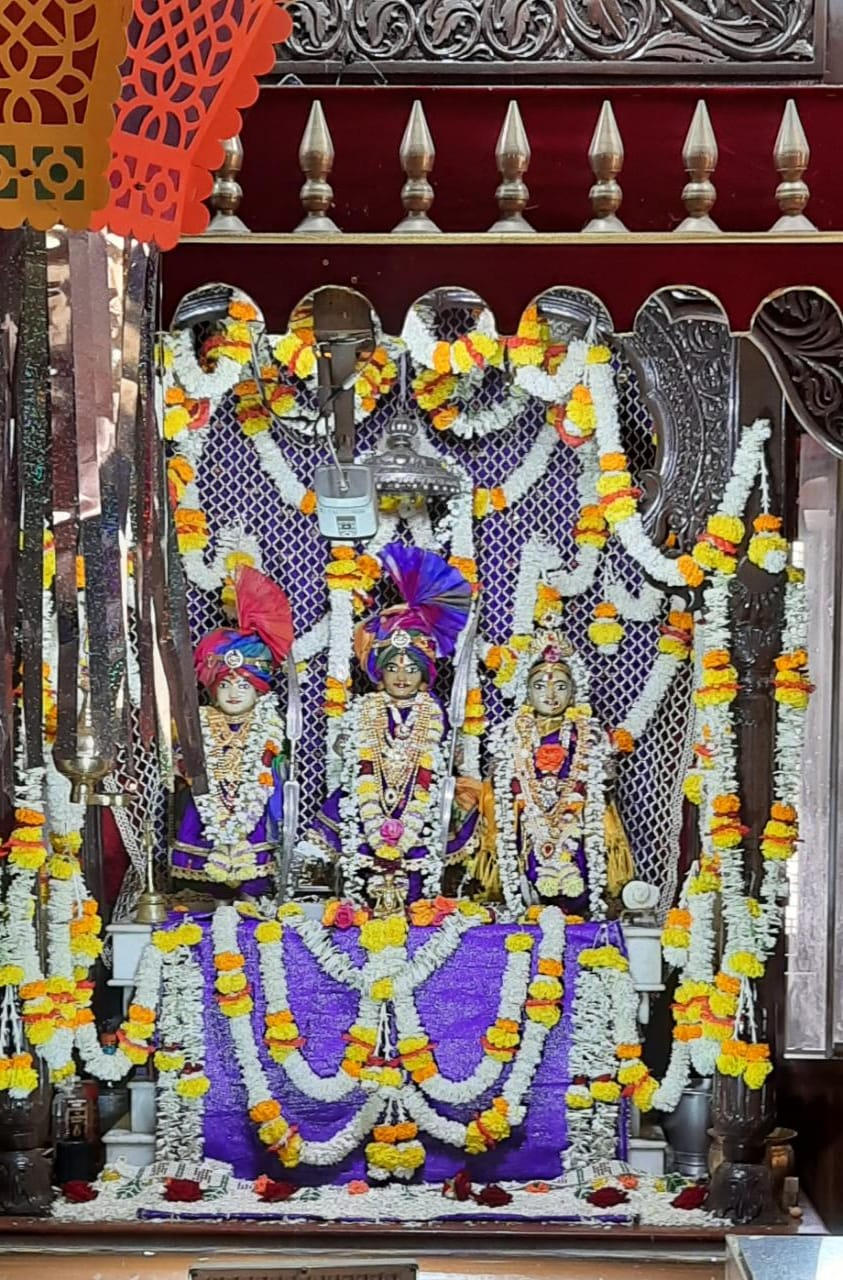
Idols of Rama, Lakshmana and Sita at Thorale Rama Temple

At the age of twelve, Ganpati left home in search of enlightenment. He travelled extensively, and eventually arrived at Yehalegaon, a village near present-day Nanded. There, he met Tukamai, a saint revered to be a living synthesis of the three distinct paths to self-realization: Jnana Yoga, Bhakti Yoga, and Karma Yoga. He stayed under the tutelage of Tukamai for nine months. He would obediently follow the latter's instructions during this time. On one occasion of Ram Navami, Tukamai initiated Ganpati with the mantra "Śrī Rāma Jaya Rāma Jaya Jaya Rāma (Sanskrit: श्री राम जय राम जय जय राम)", and bestowed upon the latter the title of "Brahmachaitanya."

Over the next few years, Brahmachaitanya travelled across the Indian subcontinent. He went to various regions and towns such as the Himalayas, Ujjain, Ayodhya, Kashi, Calcutta, Indore and Nasik. During March 1866, he returned back to Gondavale and adopted a householder lifestyle. His first wife, Saraswati, and their son died shortly afterward. Later, he married a daughter of the Deshpande or district record-keeper of Atpadi. His second wife was blind since birth. She later came to be known as Aaisaheb. He also embarked on a pilgrimage along with his mother, Gitabai, to Kashi and Ayodhya. Gitabai probably died in Ayodhya.

=== Return to Gondavale and death ===
During later years, Brahmachaitanya continued to expound spiritual methods revolving around devotion to the deity Rama. He also had a Rama temple built as an extension to his residence.

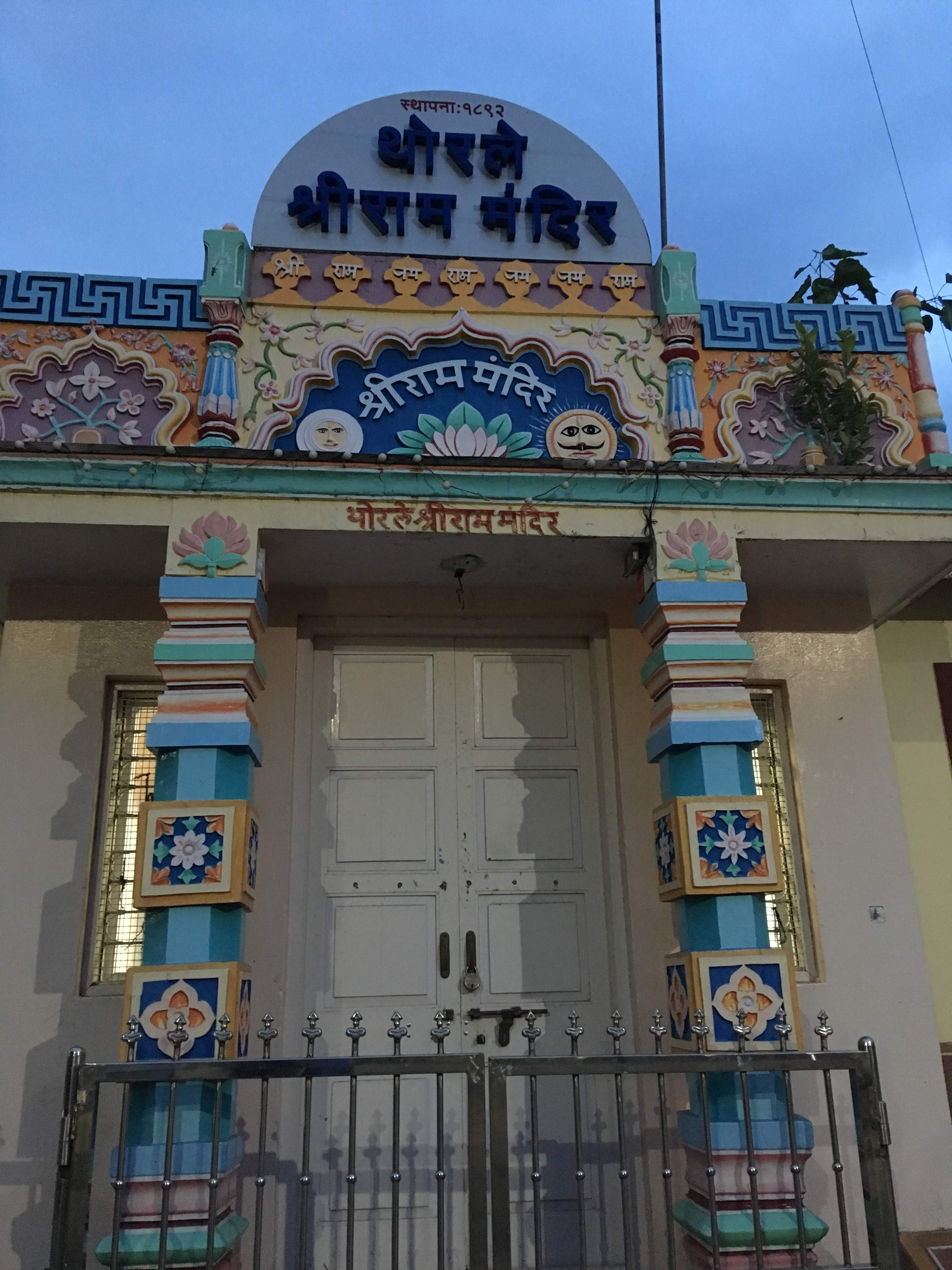
Temple of Rama at Gondavale

With time, the number of his disciples and followers soared. To cater to these increasing numbers, he arranged for the construction of Rama, Dattatreya, and Shani temples along with accommodation facilities at Gondavale. He also had Rama temples built in other rural regions of present-day Maharashtra.

He died on 22 December 1913, at Gondavale.

== Philosophy ==
He was a proponent of Bhakti Yoga. His teachings were aligned to those of Samarth Ramdas, his spiritual predecessor. The Rama-nama mantra, originally attributed to Ramdas, was promoted by Brahmachaitanya as a means of spiritual evolution. The mantra was central to his teachings. According to S. G. Tulpule, Brahmachaitanya, like earlier Vaishanavite saints such as Mirabai, Ramdas, Chaitanya Mahaprabhu and Tulsidas, was a well-known preacher and practitioner of mantra recitation.

He frequently used pravachan or spiritual discourses and bhajan or devotional hymns to encourage people along the path of devotion. He endorsed cow protection and food donation. He is an important 19th-century religious figure behind the revival of Vedic ritualism in the Indian state of Maharashtra.

== Teachings ==
He advised his adherents to rigorously follow spiritual practices to attain self-realization. According to him, there are two proven ways to moksha or liberation for people active in materialistic pursuits. These are satsangati (Sanskrit: सत्संगती) or company of saints and naam (Sanskrit: नाम) or name of deity. Most of his teachings emphasized on the recitation of naam japa. He advocated for round-the-clock remembrance of the divine through naam japa as a means to happiness, contentment and peace.

His teachings are summarized in his subodh (Sanskrit: सुबोध) or set of clear instructions.

Teachings stated in the subodh are listed as follows:

- Keep chanting the deity's name and communicate the significance of chanting to everyone you meet.
- Naam alone is the ultimate truth.
- Naam is the means and the end.
- Stay involved in mantra chanting even when active in worldly pursuits.
- Be happy and stay away from laziness, fear and hate.
- Always be mindful of the divine presence in life.
- Be polite and nice to people and stay fully devoted to Rama.
- Maintain purity in thought and action and refrain from hypocrisy.
- Consider Rama as your friend, guide and master and surrender to him wholeheartedly.
- Give your 100% to everything you do and leave the results of your effort to Rama, thereby surrendering your ego entirely.
- Control your desires and be righteous in your behavior.
- Rama is the giver of happiness, and one should consider performing worldly duties as a way to serve Him.
- Sing and chant His name and always be content and at peace even if you lose all your worldly belongings.
- Pride is the greatest enemy of a seeker, be alert and do not give in to your ego.
- Rama resides in our hearts. He is the epitome of love and yearns for love from all his devotees.

His daily discourses have been compiled into a book called Pravachane.

== Noted disciples and followers ==
=== Keshav Belsare ===
Keshav Belsare, also affectionately known as "Baba" (father), was born into a middle-class family in Hyderabad on 8 February 1909. He had learnt texts such as the Bhagavad Gita, Dasbodh and Dnyaneshwari, at an early age. He is claimed to have memorized all of the 700 shlokas of the Bhagavad Gita within a single week. He started out as a teacher of English at Balmohan Vidyalaya in Dadar, and later became a professor of philosophy at Siddhartha College in Mumbai. His lectures were immensely popular in college, and students from multiple disciplines would enrol for his classes. He was known to possess extraordinary clarity and an ability to teach complex subjects in an easy-to-understand manner. He was initiated in 1931. Over time, he became a prominent propagator of Brahmachaitanya's teachings. He actively engaged in promoting these teachings for more than 60 years. He would often conduct discourses on topics ranging from meditation to literary works such as Dnyaneshwari and Dasbodh. He authored more than 50 books in Marathi. His notable works include the biography of Brahmachaitanya, Upanishdacha Abhyas and Bhavarthgatha.

=== Dattatreya Bendre ===
Dattatreya Bendre (31 January 1896 – 26 October 1981) was a Kannada poet and recipient of the Jnanpith Award. He revered Brahmachaitanya and believed the latter to have bestowed upon him "the gift of poetry".

== Worship ==
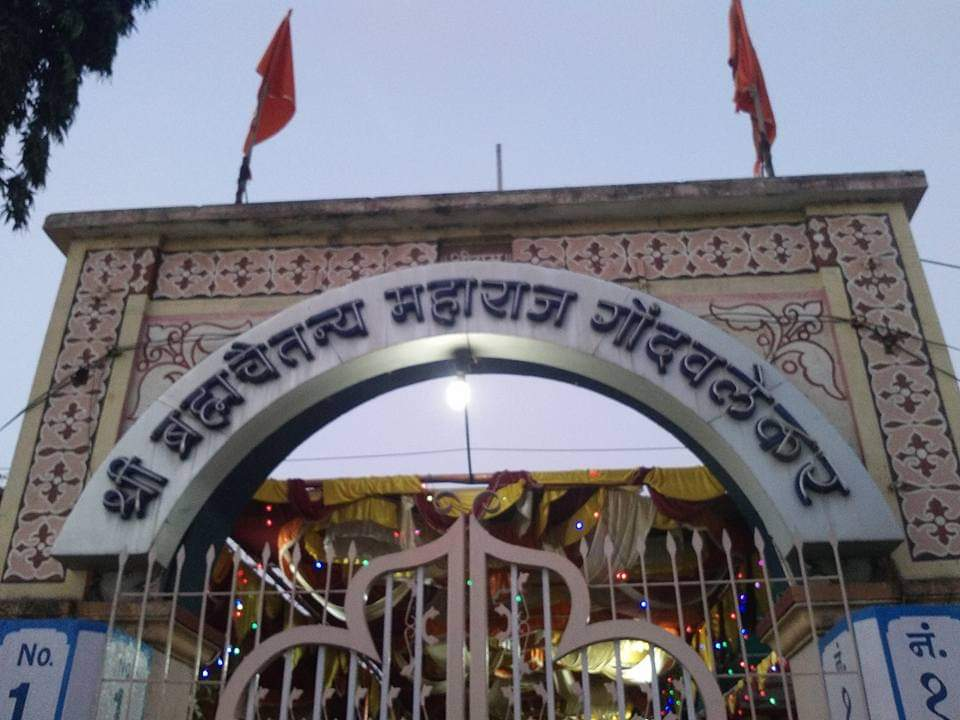
Entrance to the Samadhi Mandir dedicated to Brahmachaitanya at Gondavle

=== Temples ===
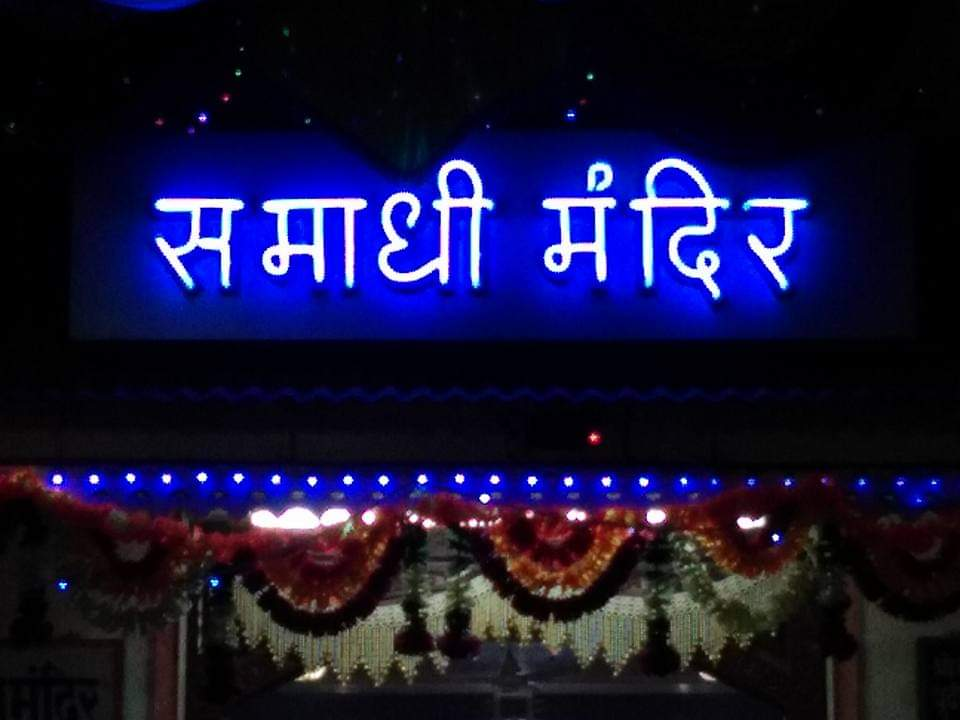
Samadhi Mandir, Gondavle

Brahmachaitanya and his adherants built and consecrated many temples around India. There are temples dedicated to him in Maharashtra, as well as in Bangalore (Srinivasanagar), and Hebbali in Dharwad District. Ram-naam japa rituals are held on a daily basis at these temples.

The temples are listed as follows:

	Temple	Location	Year of Construction
1	Dhakate Rama Mandir	Gondavale	1895
2	Datta Mandira, Aatapaadi	Aatapaadi	1892
3	Thorale Rama Mandir	Gondavale	1892
4	Vitthala Mandir	Gondavale	
5	Rama Mandir	Beladadhi	1896
6	Ananda Rama Mandir	Jalna, Anandavadi	1896
7	Tilwankar Rama Mandir	Varanasi	1897/98
8	Pattabhi Rama Mandir	Harda	1900
9	Rajaadhiraja Rama Mandir	Mandave	1901
10	Rama Mandir	Giravi	1901
11	Rama Mandir	Sorati, Ujjain	1901
12	Rama Mandir	Yavagal	1901
13	Datta Mandira	Yavagal	1901
14	Rama Mandir	Kagavada	1902
15	Rama Mandir	Gomewadi	1903
16	Rama Mandir	Mhasoorne	1903
17	Rama Mandir	Vita	1903
18	Rama Mandir	Manjarde	1905/6
19	Bhadagavkar Rama Mandir	Pandharpur	1908
20	Janaki Jeevana Rama Mandir	Morgiri	1908
21	Datta Mandira	Satara	1908
22	Vitho Anna Daphthardar Rama Murthi	Patna	1909
23	Javalgekar Rama Mandir	Solapur	1909
24	chidambara nayakara Rama Mandira	Hubli	1909
25	Kurthakoti Rama Mandir	Kurthakoti	1909
26	Atapadi Rama Mandir	Atapadi	1909
27	Vitthala Mandir	Khathavala	1909
28	Vitthala Mandir	Uksaan	1909
29	Vitthala Mandir	Naragunda	1909
30	Venkatesha Mandir	Venkatapura	1909
31	Venugopala Mandir	Bidarahall	1909
32	Hanuman Mandir	Kaagavaada	1909
33	Rama Mandir	Kannhad	1911
34	Datta Mandira	Gondavale	1911
35	Shani Mandir	Gondavale	1911
36	Kuravali Rama Mandir.	Siddeshwara	1913
37	Dahiwadi Rama Mandir	Dahiwadi, Maharashtra	1912
38	Haradasi Rama Mandir	Sangli	1912/13
39	Kukkadavada Rama Mandir	Chintamani, Karnataka	1912/13
40	Likthe Rama Mandir	Pune	1914
41	Kherdi Rama Mandir	Chiplun, Maharashtra	1914
42	Ashwathapur Rama Mandir	Badagumijaru, Karnataka	1915
43	Emmikeri Rama Mandir	Dharwad	1915/17
44	Line Bazar Rama Mandir	Dharwad	1915/17
45	Sri Vishwanatha Seetha Rama chandra Mandira	Gajendraghada	1916
46	Kanchisamudram Rama Mandir	Kanchisamudram, Andhra Pradesh	1923
47	Sri Shendurani Ghat Rama Mandir		1923
48	Sri Shendurani Ghat Rama Mandir	Kurundavada	1929
49	Rama Mandir	Viduraashwatha	1930
50	Rama Mandira	Indore	1931
51	Brahmachaithanya Rama Mandira	Mandaleshwara	1932
52	Rama Mandira	Gowdigalli, Hubbali	1945
53	Sri Brahmachaithanya sri Rama Mandira	Chintamani, Karnataka	1949
54	Rama Mandira	Kudoor, Karnataka	1969
55	Shri Brahmachaithanya Ashrama & Rama Mandira	Parvathi Payaatha	1976
56	Rama Mandira	Hadonahalli	1983
57	Sri Rama Mandira	Samartha Kuti Bedi, Udavah	1994
58	Rama Mandira	Vudagyav, Pune	1995
59	Rama Mandira	Maardi	1997
60	Maharaja's Paduka Mandirs		
61	Maharaja's Paduka Mandirs	Kolhapur	1920
62	Rendaalkar Paduka Mandir	Kolhapur	1920
63	Brahmachaithanya Mutt	Malad	1929
64	Brahmachaithanya Mutt & Hanuman Mandir	Mandsaur	1947
65	Sri Brahmachaithanya Mandir	Bangalore	1972
66	Paaduka Mandir	Londa	1982
67	Paaduka Mandir	Hebballi	1984
68	Paaduka Mandir	Halenagara, Bhadravathi	1988
69	Gondavale Dhaam	Indore 70 Sree Vittala Chaithanya Mandira, Chamundipuram, Mysuru, Karnataka	

== In literature ==
- Sri Brahmachaitanya Gondavalekar Maharaj – biography by K.V. Belsare
