= Gavari =

40-day long festival held in the Mewar region of Rajasthan, India

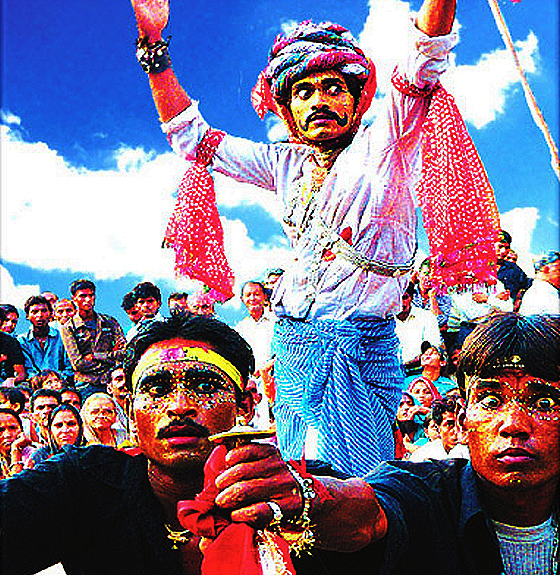
- Gavari performers.
- Genre: Religious
- Location: Rajasthan
- Country: India

Gavari, also spelt Gavri, is a 40-day long annual festival celebrated in July and September in the Mewar region of Rajasthan, India.

== Gavari season ==
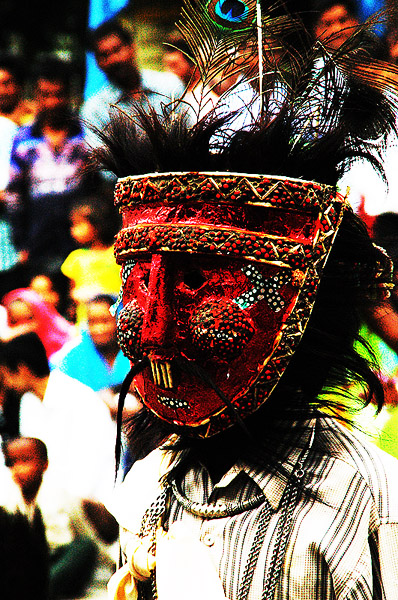
Masked Gavari Budia figure from rural Jaisamand troupe

Each year, bhopa shamans from Mewar's Bhil communities petition the Goddess to permit their villagers to perform the Gavari ritual and to accompany them for the weeks of touring. The average wait time for her consent is about 4–5 years, and once the ritual cycle begins, she must also be successfully invoked before each daily ceremony. Only when she visibly possesses one or more troupe members can the dance dramas begin and the ritual proceed.

Each of the 25 participating communities forms and dispatches its own Gavari company of 20-80 members. The troupes crisscross Mewar, performing more than 600 day-long village ceremonies in all. Gavari troupes can play to over a quarter of a million people annually.

During the 40-day Gavari season, all players practice strict austerities to maintain reverent contact with the living earth and the immanent spirit. They avoid sex, alcohol and meat, as well as shoes, beds, bathing, and eating greens (which might harm insect life). During the season, they eat only a single meal each day.

In the final days, each troupe returns to its home village for a last performance and closing ceremonies. The cycle ends with an immersion rite to return the Goddess's fertility to their waters and all night raucous celebrations.

== Dramas ==
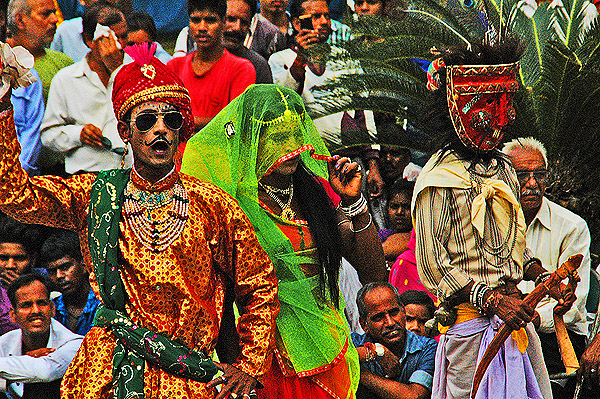
Kali avatar shows magic power by spitting out red-hot coals

A Gavari troupe repertoire may include 10-15 classic traditional tales and new ones are still evolving, but the overarching themes are the sacredness of the natural world, radical human equality, and the feminine nature of the divine. These values are reflected in traditional Bhil society where the environment is revered, hierarchy is abhorred, and women enjoy greater rights and status than in communities outside.

Among Gavari's many mythic dramas, two of the most popular and often repeated are Badalya Hindawa (The Banyan Swing) and Bhilurana (King of the Bhils).

Badalya Hindawa recounts how the Goddess re-greened the Earth after a life-erasing flood and fiercely defends it thereafter from greed, stupidity and harm. The playlet features a powerful guru who loses his disciples beneath a sacred banyan tree and demands that the local king destroy it as an illicit source of power. The unnerved king complies and has the tree cut down. The Goddess and her devi sisters are outraged at this desecration and slip into his court disguised as acrobatic dancers to exact revenge. They lure the king close with their artistry, reveal their true nature, indict him for cowardice and sacrilege, and mortally terminate his reign.

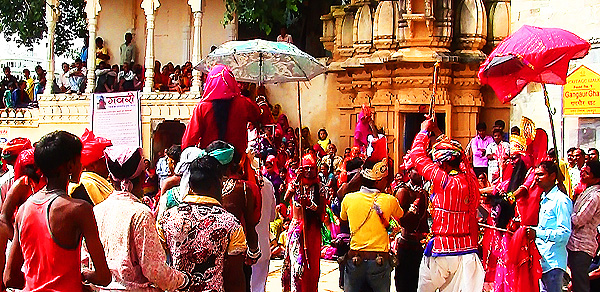
Bhilurana: on left the British invaders, on right Bhils preparing to resist. The green parasol marks the Empress of India, Queen Victoria; the red Goddess Kali, the Bhils’ secret power source.

Bhilurana is the tale of a composite leader representing five centuries of Bhil resistance to intrusions of all kinds. The play compresses and conflates the armed might of Turkic, Mughal and British invaders and depicts Goddess-inspired Bhil warriors finally driving them all away with daring ambushes, sabotage and shrewd guerrilla tactics.

Both plays end with celebration, salutations to the Goddess, and clear warnings to interlopers to never violate Nature or their sovereignty again.

Gavari drama emphasis inspired improvisation over rehearsal and memorisation. The beginnings and ends of Gavari dramas are known, but how things transpire in between is highly mutable. There are no scripts and many players are illiterate farmers and labourers. Individual plays can continue for hours, contain long soliloquies and dialogues, and are only performed by a particular troupe once on four or five years. The flexible and intuitive improvisational method encourages a wide range of creative expressions, leading to diverse interpretations of the same stories across various villages. Players strive to perform in a receptive trance known as bhava, which resembles the fluid creative state that musicians and athletes call "flow" or "the zone".

=== Characters ===
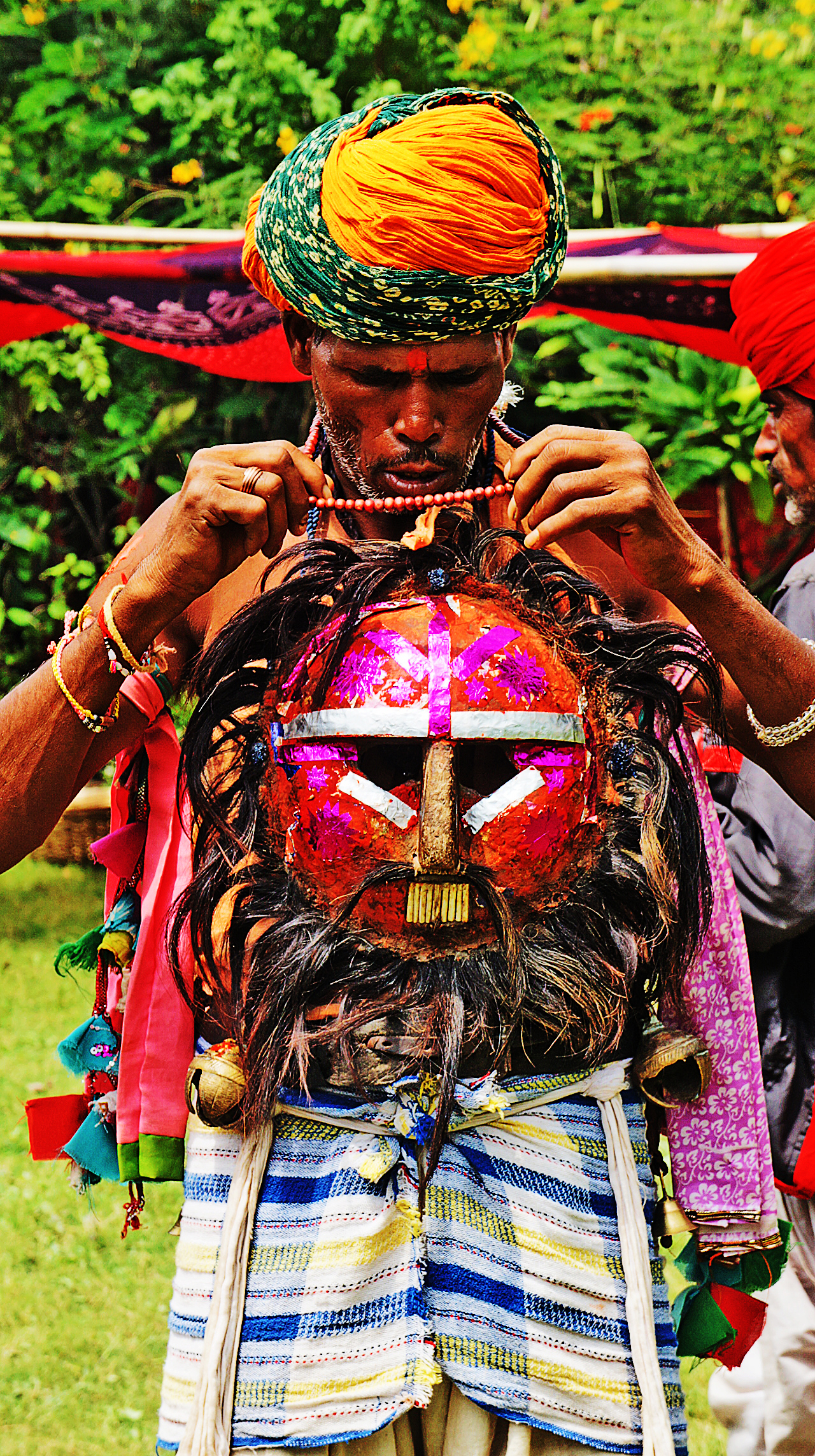
Budia player

Depending on the day and the plays selected a single Gavari troupe can present dozens of different characters - goddess avatars, gods, demons, historical figures, sacred animals, corrupt officials, etc. The only constant roles, which exist outside the dramas, are the Budia figure, his twin Rai devi consorts and Kutkadia, the master of ceremonies.

Women are not allowed to tour as actors with the troupe due to the 4-5 day menstrual isolation Bhil women observe each month. Consequently, all female characters are portrayed by men.

Budia embodies a powerful fusion of Shaivite and demonic energies and is a vital protective Gavari figure. He is distinguished by his dramatic horse hair-fringed mask, sacred staff and twin Rai consorts. In each day's Gavari ceremony the Budia character has three main duties: circling the arena during opening invocations in the opposite direction as the dancers to seal in and protect the energy field they are generating; patrolling the arena perimeter during dance drama sequences to prevent audience members from entering the players' area or shaman circle unless they are clearly entranced; and periodically holding court at the arena's edge with his Rai escorts to accept offerings on behalf of the troupe and confer blessings.

Every Gavari village has its own iconic Budia mask, which is treated as a sacred object and often handed down for generations.

== Origin ==
There are many speculative theories about Gavari's origin.

According to one hypothesis, it began in rural Mewar at the end of the 16th century, when Mewaris largely regained control of their lands and lives from the Mughals in 1579. The Rajput court gratefully awarded their mountain-dwelling Bhil brethren both unprecedented recognition and vast tracts of fertile agricultural land. The latter boon gradually drew most Bhils out of their forest encampments and began their transition to village agriculture. The 16th century hypothesis thus holds that this settling down of a semi-nomadic people created a nostalgia for their more adventurous heritage. Others assert that Gavari began in the 3rd or 4th century in Gujarat, and still others that it as old as Bhil culture itself and dates back four millennia.

== Religious and shamanic aspects ==
=== Invocations ===
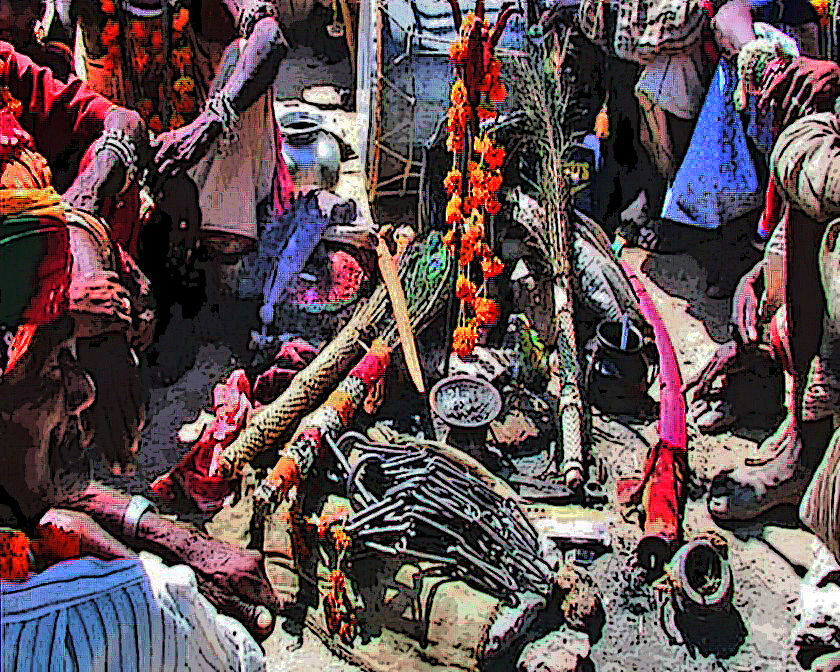
Ritual implements for invocation rites

Gavari troupes perform two distinct invocation rituals. The first is used to ask the Goddess to permit a village to perform the Gavari cycle. This invocation is held in every Mewari Bhil community on or shortly before the full moon in the Hindu month of Shravana, which usually falls in August as the monsoon planting season ends.

The second is to confirm Her presence and participation at the start of each day's performance. Both invocations require incense, flowers. chanting, madal drum and thali cymbal music, a Shaivite trishula, and the kindling of a dhuni fire.

Initial sanction invocations are usually held in a darkened sanctuary attended by a small group of bhopa shamans, village elders and veteran Gavari players. Other villagers gather outside to await Her decision which is delivered by a possessed trembling bhopa. He proceeds to channel Her spirit as She explains why She will or won't allow them to perform this year. Typical reasons for refusal include discord in the village, shrine disrepair, a poor monsoon, a crop blight, etc., which must be dealt with satisfactorily before petitioning Her again.

Daily confirmation invocations are performed around an altar in the center of the Gavari arena where shamans, musicians and senior players gather in a tight circle. The rest of the players and occasionally villagers dance counterclockwise around this core to create a welcoming energy field. A guardian Budia figure circles the dancers in the opposite direction to seal in their energy and protect it from misuse. The Goddess spirit's arrival and presence is signaled by one or more bhopas falling into trembling bhava trance.

Additional ritual instruments employed following the manifestation of the deity include peacock feather scepters utilized to emphasize and convey the dynamic energy of possession, as well as sturdy saankal chains that trance-induced participants frequently use to strike their backs.

=== Possession and trance ===
Successful invocations have several visible effects. First they connect the village shaman(s) to the Goddess spirit so they can audibly articulate Her concerns, requests and will. Second, they infuse the Gavari players with creative inspiration to ably enact their roles. Finally, they can overwhelm some villagers with a sense of wonder, grace and bliss. Entranced villagers may be welcomed into the shaman circle or approached for healing and blessings by other members of the crowd. Those possessed often later report feelings of great exhilaration and selfless unity with all surrounding life. Such experiences reinforce Bhils' belief in Gavari's power, their own inalienable equality, and the sacredness of the natural world.

== Social and cultural significance ==
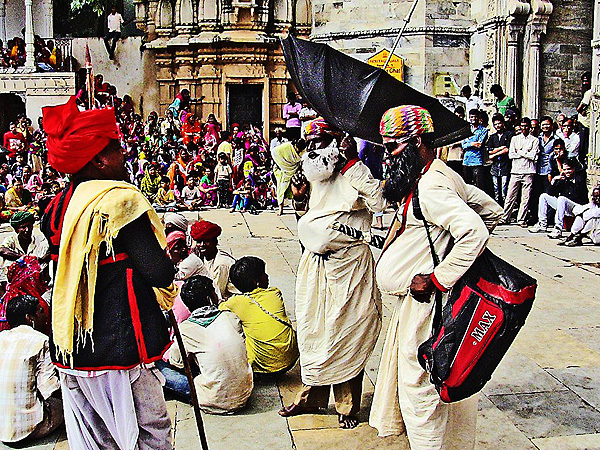
Satiric skit mocking fat traders who come to fleece the villagers

In Gavari, the beauty and power of the natural world are the ultimate expression of divinity. Wilful or heedless damage to its diversity, health or future is thus regarded as not only short-sighted and suicidal, but also criminal and blasphemous. Such views are the seed Seven generation sustainability among many indigenous tribes and their current widespread battles to safeguard water resources, endangered ecosystems and biocultural diversity.

Gavari performances in rural Mewar feature dramatic narratives that critique figures of authority, including officials, religious figures, and merchants. These theatrical traditions reflect localized skepticism toward institutional power, which some commentators associate with the cultural context leading to the enactment of India's Right to Information Act in 2005.

Gavari's itinerant format continues to connect and promote solidarity among Mewar's rural villages and their constituent castes and religious communities. Its mythic and historical repertoire also helps make tribal youth aware of their heritage.

Gavari's comedic skits on farm finance, greedy middlemen and corrupt merchants offer villagers wry lessons in real world commerce and economic self-defense, especially with regard to crop brokers, moneylenders, credit scams, and urban conceptions of wealth.

Gavari tightens inter-community bonds with its month of itinerant village visitations and solidifies Bhils’ sense of responsibility for a world far beyond their neighboring fields. Although only Bhils play roles in the ceremony, Gavari performances also internally solidify communities by involving all castes, communities and age groups in the preparations.

== Current status ==
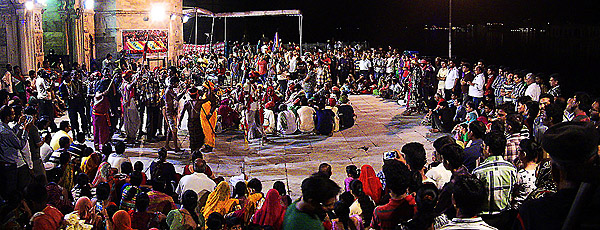
"Rediscovering Gavari" program stages rare urban evening performance at Udaipur's Gangaur Ghat.

The Gavari tradition at home has fallen on hard times Rajasthan's government schools forbid Bhil students to be truant to accompany their village Gavari troupes on their month-long pilgrimages. This impacts the passing-down of Gavari traditions, as the only way to learn its ceremonies, arts and stories is as an apprentice participant. Additionally, working age youth are increasingly moving to metro centers in search of employment; thus, the average size and number of rural Gavari troupes continues to decline.

However, Bhil communities continue to encourage the festival, with Bhil organizations promoting Gavari and its core values. The first English language introduction to Gavari is now available; lobbying is underway for Sangeet Nakat Akademi and UNESCO recognition of Gavari as a globally significant Intangible Cultural Heritage treasure; an increasing number of Gavari clips are appearing on YouTube and Japanese scholars have initiated economic studies of Gavari's societal benefits.

Udaipur's West Zone Cultural Centre has started presenting films and samples of Gavari artistry; and local eco-festivals are also introducing the tradition to urban audiences.

=== Rediscovering Gavari ===
In 2016, the Udaipur District Collector and Rajasthan Chief Minister Vasundhara Raje mobilized local agencies and NGOs to create "Rediscovering Gavari", a multi-year program to promote "Gavari as an ancient folk art miracle... spiritually arousing, artistically surprising and historically mysterious."

The Rediscovering Gavari program invited 12 rural troupes to perform the ceremony on different days in iconic Udaipur settings. The program exposed thousands of tourists and townsfolk to Gavari for the first time and sparked media attention. This was followed by the first Gavari presentation in Delhi at the 2016 National Tribal Carnival, which was attended by Prime Minister Narendra Modi.

== See also ==
- Folk religion
- Guerrilla theatre
- Indigenism
- Naturalistic pantheism
- Nature worship
- Rajasthani people
- Religious naturalism
