= Battle of Saunshi =

1777 battle

| Date | 1777 |
| Location | Saunshi, Karnataka |
| Result | Mysorean victory |

Belligerents
| Maratha Empire | Kingdom of Mysore |

Commanders and leaders
| (Maratha Empire) Konher Rao † (Maratha Empire) Padurang Rao (POW) | Hyder Ali; Muhammad Ali |

The Battle of Saunshi was fought between the Kingdom of Mysore and the Maratha Empire in 1777. Hyder Ali attempted to regain the territories of Malabar and Coorg from the Marathas and was successful in doing so. Hyder Ali decided to attack the Marathas at Saunshi, sending his trusted general Muhammad Ali to attack the Maratha garrison stationed there, achieving a decisive victory for Mysore and Hyder Ali against the Maratha forces. Maratha Chief Konher Rao was killed in the battle and Pandurang Rao was captured and taken as a prisoner by the Mysore forces.
