= Brahmanand =

Brahmanand is an Indian male given name and may refer to:

- Brahmanand Swami (1772–1832), of the Swaminarayan Sampraday
- Swami Brahmananda (1863–1922), of the Ramakrishna Mission
- Brahmanand Maharaj (1859–1919), disciple of Gondavalekar Maharaj
- Brahmanand Mandal (born 1947), Indian politician
- Brahmanand Sankhwalkar (born 1954), Indian footballer
- Brahmanand S. Siingh (born 1965), Indian filmmaker
- Brahmanand Raghvanand, Indo-Fijian civil servant

== See also ==
- Brahmananda (disambiguation)
