= Namasamkirtana =

Congregational chanting in Hinduism

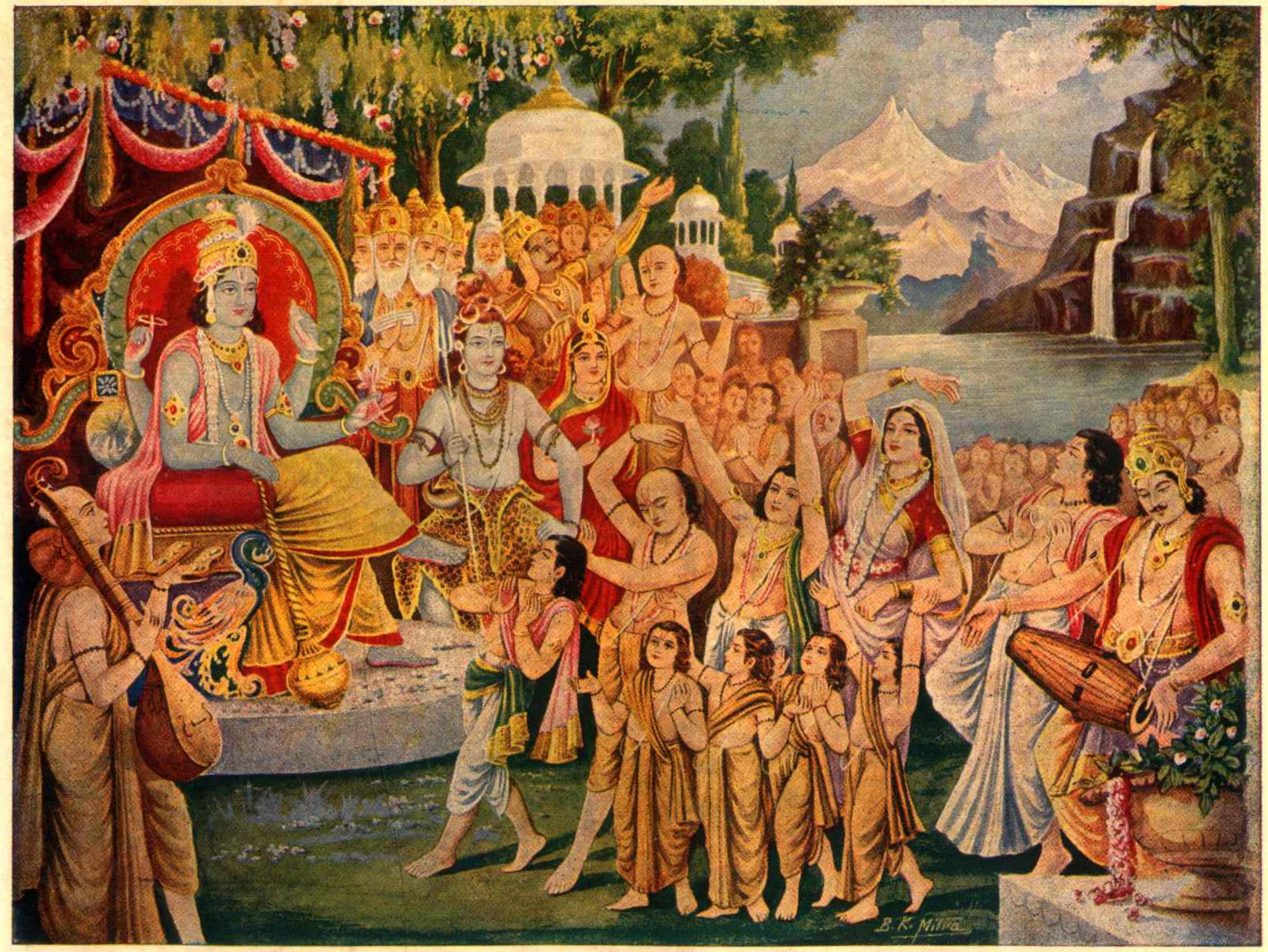
Painting of a namasamkirtana, Gita Press, Gorakhpur.

The namasamkirtana (Sanskrit: नामसङ्कीर्तन, romanized: Nāmasaṅkīrtana), also rendered namajapa (Sanskrit: नामजप, romanized: Nāmajapa) is the Hindu practice of congregational chanting of the names and other sacred expressions associated with a given deity. More commonly practised by members of the Vaishnava tradition, the namasamkirtana is characterised by devotees chanting the names of God in a religious gathering, in an expression of bhakti (devotion) and in a bid to achieve devotional ecstasy. This practice is regarded to have become popularised by the traditions that centred around Chaitanya, Vallabha, and Vithoba. The practice is regarded to be a common form of bhajana.

== Description ==
In Vaishnavism, the chanting of any or all of the names of Vishnu, either with or without the help of a japamala (rosary), is regarded to offer punya (religious merit) to the chanter, and is hence an important part of ritualistic worship. Chanting the names of Vishnu is regarded to be a method of salvation in the Kali Yuga.

According to Gaudiya Vaishnavism, the loud chanting and singing of the name of God is regarded to be conducive to attaining salvation, since it is considered to represent a more expressive love of God and thereby constitutes a greater spiritual experience.

The recitation of the names of Vishnu is a central theme of many texts, such as the Tiruppavai of Andal.

== See also ==
- Bhajana
- Ramanama
- Japa
