= Ramanama =

Hindu practice of chanting the name of Rama

Painting of Rama and Sita, Cleveland Museum of Art

The ramanama (Sanskrit: रामनाम, romanized: rāmanāma, lit. 'the name of Rama') is the Hindu practice of ritually chanting the name of the deity Rama, an avatar of Vishnu. Rama's name is often chanted or sung within several traditions of Hinduism in the form of a japa, or meditative repetition.

== Literature ==
In the Ramacharitamanasa, the ramanama is regarded to offer strength to Hanuman.

According to a story based on the Ramayana, Pratardana, the king of Kashi, had insulted Vishvamitra, and was hence attacked by the arrows of Rama. The king was advised to chant the name of Rama by Hanuman, who subsequently saved him from the arrows.

In the Guru Granth Sahib, the sacred book and current guru of Sikhism, the name of Rama is the second most commonly used name for the formless God after the name Hari.

In the Vishnu Sahasranama, a popular verse indicates the significance of the name of Rama. In the Padma Purana, Shiva recites the verse to his consort Parvati:

Śrī rāma rāma rāmeti
rame rāme manorame
sahasranāma tat-tulyaṁ
rāma-nāma varānane

O you charming one, O you of an excellent face, I, saying 'Rama, Rama' am interested in Rama. Rama's name is equal to the one thousand names (of Vishnu).

— Padma Purana, Chapter 254

== In popular culture ==
The mantra was often used by Mahatma Gandhi.

Neem Karoli Baba encouraged the constant repetition of "Ram" in order to become closer to God, saying: "By taking the name of Ram, everything is accomplished."

A popular mantra is Shri Rama Jaya Rama Jaya Jaya Rama (often prefixed with "Om"), which was popularised in western India by Samarth Ramdas. Swami Ramdas is said to have attained nirvana through the constant repetition of this mantra. He established Anandashram, where this mantra is chanted continuously from morning to night.

"Ramanama satya hai" (transl. The name of Rama is the truth) is a Hindi phrase commonly chanted by Hindus while carrying a dead body to be cremated.

Tyagaraja,popular composer of Carnatic music, chanted ramanama 96 crore times in his lifetime and mentioned the ramanama quite often in his compositions.

== See also ==
- Namasamkirtana
- Bhajan
- Hari Om
