= Pranava yoga =

Meditation on the sacred mantra Om

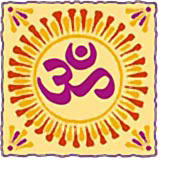
Ornamental aum Symbol

Pranava yoga is meditation on the sacred mantra Om, as outlined in the Upanishads, the Bhagavad Gita, and the Yoga Sutras of Patanjali. It is also called Aum yoga and Aum yoga meditation. It is, simply put, fixing the mind on the sound of the mantra "Aum" – the sacred syllable that both symbolizes and embodies Brahman, the Absolute Reality – as the mantra is constantly repeated in unison with the breath. The purpose of pranava yoga is to become free from suffering and limitation.

The purpose is well stated in the Prashna Upanishads:

"What world does he who meditates on Aum until the end of his life, win by That? If he meditates on the Supreme Being with the syllable Aum, he becomes one with the Light, he is led to the world of Brahman [the Absolute Being] Who is higher than the highest life, That which is tranquil, unaging, immortal, fearless, and supreme."

— Prashna Upanishad 5:1.5.7

== The mantra Aum ==
Aum, according to Hindu philosophy, is the primordial sound from which the whole universe was created. Aum, also called the Pranava, is the original Word of Power, and is recited as a mantra. A mantra is a series of verbal sounds having inherent sound-power that can produce a particular physical or psychological effect, not just something that has an assigned intellectual meaning. The word mantra derives from the Sanskrit expression mananaath thraayathe which loosely means "a transforming thought"; literally, "that which, when thought, carries one across [the worldly ocean of sorrow]". The power of a mantra lies in its ability to produce an objective, perceptible change in the yogi who repeats it correctly.

In the yoga tradition, Aum is the most sacred of holy words, the supreme mantra. Aum is also called the Pranava, a Sanskrit word which means both controller of life force (prana) and life-giver (infuser of prana). "That which causes all the pranas to prostrate themselves before and get merged in the Paramatman, so as to attain identity with Him, is for that reason known as the Pranava." – Atharvashikha Upanishad 1:10a. Aum is called the Shabda Brahman – God as Sound/Vibration. According to yoga theory, the universe has emanated from this primal movement in God. By following the thread of Aum back in meditation to more and more subtle levels of awareness, the yogi regains union with Brahman.

== The Upanishads ==
The Upanishads (both the major and minor) are full of references to Aum and meditation on Aum. Below is a small sampling:

- "He who utters Om with the intention 'I shall attain Brahman' does verily attain Brahman." - Taittiriya Upanishad 1.8.1
- "The Self is of the nature of the Syllable Om...Meditate on Om as the Self" - Mandukya Upanishad 1.8.12, 2.2.3)
- "The form of meditation that came to manifest as the foremost of all, for the regeneration of all seekers, was the First Word, indicative of Brahman [God]: the Syllable Om. Meditation on Om should be resorted to by seekers after liberation. This Syllable is the Supreme Brahman." – Atharvashikha Upanishad 1:1,2
- "God is the Syllable Om, out of Him proceeds the Supreme Knowledge." – Svetasvatara Upanishad 4:17
- "Om is Brahman, the Primeval Being. This is the Veda which the knowers of Brahman know; through it one knows what is to be known." – Brihadaranyaka Upanishad 5.1.1
- "One should meditate on this Syllable [Om]." – Chandogya Upanishad 1.1.1
- "The Syllable Om is the bow: one's self, indeed, is the arrow. Brahman is spoken of as the target of that. It is to be hit without making a mistake. Thus one becomes united with it [Brahman] as the arrow becomes one with the target." – Mundaka Upanishad 2.2.4
- Katha Upanishad 1.2.15, 1.2.16, 1.2.17

== Bhagavad Gita ==
Speaking from the perspective of the Infinite Being, enumerating his major manifestation-embodiments, Krishna says: "I am the syllable Om."(Gita 7:8) He also says the same thing in 9:17 ("I am...the sacred monosyllable") and 10:25 ("Among words I am the monosyllable Om").

What to "do" with aum is then outlined by Krishna: "Engaged in the practice of concentration... uttering the monosyllable Om--the Brahman--remembering Me always, he...attains to the supreme goal. I am easily attainable by that ever-steadfast Yogi who constantly and daily remembers Me."– Bhagavad Gita 6:13; 8:12-14

== Yoga Sutras of Patanjali ==
Yoga Sutras of Patanjali
Pada (Chapter)	English meaning	Sutras
Samadhi Pada	On being absorbed in spirit	51
Sadhana Pada	On being immersed in spirit	55
Vibhuti Pada	On supernatural abilities and gifts	56
Kaivalya Pada	On absolute freedom	34

Patanjali's Yoga Sutras, the most ancient and authoritative text on Yoga, outlines the purpose and process of yoga as follows:

"Ishwara [God] is a particular Purusha [Spirit, Person] Who is untouched by the afflictions of life, actions, and the results and impressions produced by these actions. In Him is the highest limit of omniscience. 36 Being unconditioned by time He is teacher even of the ancients. His designator [vachaka] is the Pranava [Om]. 37 Its japa [constant repetition] and bhavanam is the way [or: should be done]. From it result [come] the disappearance of obstacles and the turning inward of consciousness. Disease, languor, doubt, carelessness, laziness, worldly-mindedness, delusion, non-achievement of a stage, instability, these cause the distraction of the mind and they are the obstacles. [Mental] pain, despair, nervousness, and agitation are the symptoms of a distracted condition of mind. For removing these obstacles [there should be] the constant practice of the one principle [the japa and bhavanam of Om]." – Yoga Sutras of Patanjali 1:24-32

== Opinions on Aum ==
- Sri Anandamoyi Ma

"[Remembrance of the Pranava] must become so automatic that you cannot breathe without remembering It."

"Om is the root of all sounds. Every other sound is contained in That, and It is used to take one beyond all sound."

- Sri Aurobindo

"OM is the mantra, the expressive sound-symbol of the Brahman Consciousness in its four domains from the Turiya to the external or material plane. The function of a mantra is to create vibrations in the inner consciousness that will prepare it for the realisation of what the mantra symbolises and is supposed indeed to carry within itself. The mantra OM should therefore lead towards the opening of the consciousness to the sight and feeling of the One Consciousness in all material things, in the inner being and in the supraphysical worlds, in the causal plane above now superconscient to us and, finally, the supreme liberated transcendence above all cosmic existence. The last is usually the main preoccupation with those who use the mantra." Letters on Yoga, Vol. II, p. 745-46

- A. C. Bhaktivedanta Swami Prabhupada

"If you are a serious student of Vedic mantras, you will chant Om because Vedic mantras begin with Om. Om, or the Omkara, is Krishna. Many people are fond of chanting Omkara. That is also nice, because Omkara is Krishna. If we simply remember, This Omkara is Krishna then we become perfect, because the goal is to become Krishna conscious. So you can become Krishna conscious while chanting Om."

- Swami Dayananda Saraswati

"Om is the highest Name of God, and comprises many other Names of God. It should be borne in mind that Om is the Name of God exclusively—and of no other object material or spiritual—while the others are but descriptive titles and not exactly proper names."

- Kabir

"This is the Ultimate Word: but can any express its marvellous savor? He who has savored it once, he knows what joy it can give. Kabir says: Knowing it, the ignorant man becomes wise, and the wise man becomes speechless and silent."

- Lahiri Mahasaya

"Constant japa of the Pranava, Omkar, Which is self-revealing, and constant focus on It as the form of Ishvara, and dedicating all actions to It as if you are not the doer yourself; is Kriya Yoga."

- Avadhuta Nityananda Paramhansa

"Following the path of discrimination, let the pure mind be firmly fixed in Om."

- Sri Ramakrishna Paramhansa

"'What will you gain', some sages ask, 'by merely hearing this sound?' You hear the roar of the ocean from a distance. By following the roar you can reach the ocean. As long as there is the roar, there must also be the ocean. By following the trail of Om you attain Brahman, of which the Word is the symbol. That Brahman has been described by the Vedas as the ultimate goal."

- Ramana Maharshi

"The purport of prescribing meditation on the Pranava is this. The Pranava is Omkara…the advaita-mantra which is the essence of all mantras…. In order to get at this true significance, one should meditate on the Pranava. …The fruition of this process is samadhi which yields release [moksha], which is the state of unsurpassable bliss."

- Amit Ray

In the book Om Chanting and Meditation:

Om chanting is a creative art, not just mechanical repetition of a word. Om is known as Pranava, which means new, the ever fresh. So, each uttering of Om mantra is always new, unique and fresh. We all are unique.... Therefore, our utterances of Om should be spontaneous and unique.

== Bibliography ==
- Swami Prabhavananda, Frederick Manchester. The Upanishads Breath of the Eternal. Vedanta Press 1984. ISBN 0-87471-000-6
- Swami Prabhavananda (Translator), Christopher Isherwood (Translator). Bhagavad-Gita: The Song of God. Signet Classics 2002. ISBN 0-451-52844-1
- Swami Prabhavananda (Translator), Christopher Isherwood (Translator). How to Know God: The Yoga Aphorisms of Patanjali. Vedanta Press 1996. ISBN 0-87481-041-8
- Amit Ray,Om Chanting and Meditation . Inner Light Publishers, ISBN 81-910269-3-7
