= Hebballi, Dharwad =

Hebballi
- Village
- Location in Karnataka, India Hebballi (India)
- Coordinates: 15°29′N 75°08′E
- Country: India
- State: Karnataka
- District: Dharwad
- Talukas: Dharwad

Government
  - Type: Panchayat raj
  - Body: Gram panchayat

Population (2011)
  - Total: 12,659

Languages
  - Official: Kannada
- Time zone: UTC+5:30 (IST)
- ISO 3166 code: IN-KA
- Vehicle registration: KA 25 (Dharwad RTO); KA 63 (Gabbur RTO)
- Website: karnataka.gov.in

Hebballi is a large village in the southern state of Karnataka, India. It is located in the Dharwad district of Dharwad taluk. Hence it is also the 2nd largest village of Dharwad District. after Saunshi

== Demographics ==
As of the 2011 Census of India there were 2,502 households in Hebballi and a total population of 12,659 consisting of 6,456 males and 6,203 females. There were 1,497 children ages 0-6.

== See also ==
- Dharwad
- Districts of Karnataka
