= Brahmananda =

Brahmananda may refer to:

- Brahmananda Panda (1949–2010), Indian politician
- Brahmananda Saraswati (1871–1953), Indian gurudeva and monk
- Brahmanand Swami (1772–1832), Hindu saint from India
- Brahmananda Swami Sivayogi (1852–1929), Indian writer and social reformer
- Swami Brahmananda (1863–1922), disciple of Sri Ramakrishna

== See also ==
- Brahmanand (disambiguation)
- Brahmanandam, Indian actor
  - Brahmanandam filmography
  - Brahmanandam Drama Company, 2008 Indian comedy film by E. Srikanth Nahatha
- Brahma Anandam, 2025 Indian film
