= Tukamai =

Indian spiritual master

Tukaram Chaitanya

Personal life
- Born: Sukali Veer, Hingoli district, Maharashtra, India

Religious life
- Religion: Hinduism
- Philosophy: Nath Panth

Religious career
- Teacher: Swami Chinmayananda of umarkhed
- Disciples: Brahmachaitanya

Tukamai or Tukaram Chaitanya was an Indian mystic and spiritual master. He was born into a Deshastha Brahmin family to Kashinathpanta and Parvatibai at Sukali Veer, a village in present-day Hingoli district, Maharashtra. He was a disciple of Swami Chinmayananda of Umarkhed. Brahmachaitanya, a 19th-century Indian saint and spiritual master was one of his prominent disciples.
