= Brahmanand Maharaj =

Hindu saint

Brahmananda Maharaj
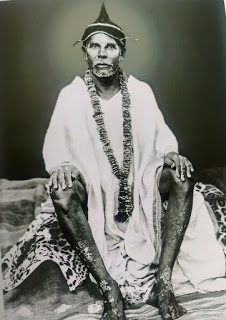
- Shri Bramhanand Maharaj

Personal life
- Born: Anantha Shastry Gadgoli; February 1859 Jalihal, Dist. Bagalakote (Karnataka)
- Died: October 1918 (aged 59) Navbag, Dist. Belgaum (Karnataka)
- Notable work: Abhang
- Honors: Brahmanand

Religious life
- Religion: Hinduism
- Founder of: Sri Ram Mandir Dist. Gadag, Sri Lakshmi Venkatesha Temple Dist. Gadag
- Philosophy: Bhakti Yoga, Vaishnavism

Religious career
- Teacher: Brahmachaitanya Maharaj, Gondavale

Brahmanand, sometimes referred to with the addition of the honorific "Maharaj", was a disciple of Brahma Chaitanya a spiritual teacher who promoted the significance of Rama during the Bhakti movement of late 19th-century India. He was born on Magha shuddha Dashami day in Jalihal village in Karnataka. He was an erudite scholar in classical Indian philosophy. His studies and circumstances made him dispassionate towards mundane life and aware of futility of bookish knowledge. Hence he left home and did austerities at Sri Lakshmi Venkatesha Temple of Venkatapur. He was instructed by the lord to go to the north India, in search of Guru. Later he found Brahmachaitanya Maharaj and he did penance under the guidance of his guru at Sarpeshwar Mandir, and attained bliss. He was responsible for the spread of bhakthi movement in Karnataka, by conducting Nama japa and temple consecrations. He died on the Mahalaya amavasya day of 1918 at Navbag, near Kagwad of Belgaum Dist, in the border between Karnataka and Maharashtra.
