= Ajapa japa =

Hindu concept related to mantras

Japa (or japam) means repeating or remembering a mantra (or mantram), and ajapa-japa (or ajapajapam) means constant awareness of the mantra, or of what it represents. The letter A in front of the word japa means without (it should be understood, that ajapa means "no chanting", thus ajapa means to stop thinking about anything material, and japa means to think about Paramatma, God instead of thinking of maya). Thus, ajapa-japa is the practice of japa without the mental effort normally needed to repeat the mantra (effort is necessary for those who are not pure enough to dedicate themselves completely to God, and still have material desires, which is the cause of repeated reincarnation in samsara ocean). In other words, it has begun to come naturally, turning into a constant awareness.

Says Swami Satchidananda:

"You can perform japa, repetition of a mantra or Sacred Word, in the midst of your day-to-day work. Then, when it becomes a habit, even when you are working intensely a portion of the mind will keep repeating the mantra always. That means you have locked one end of your chain to a holy place, while the rest of the chain remains still in the outside world."
