= Japa =

Spiritual discipline

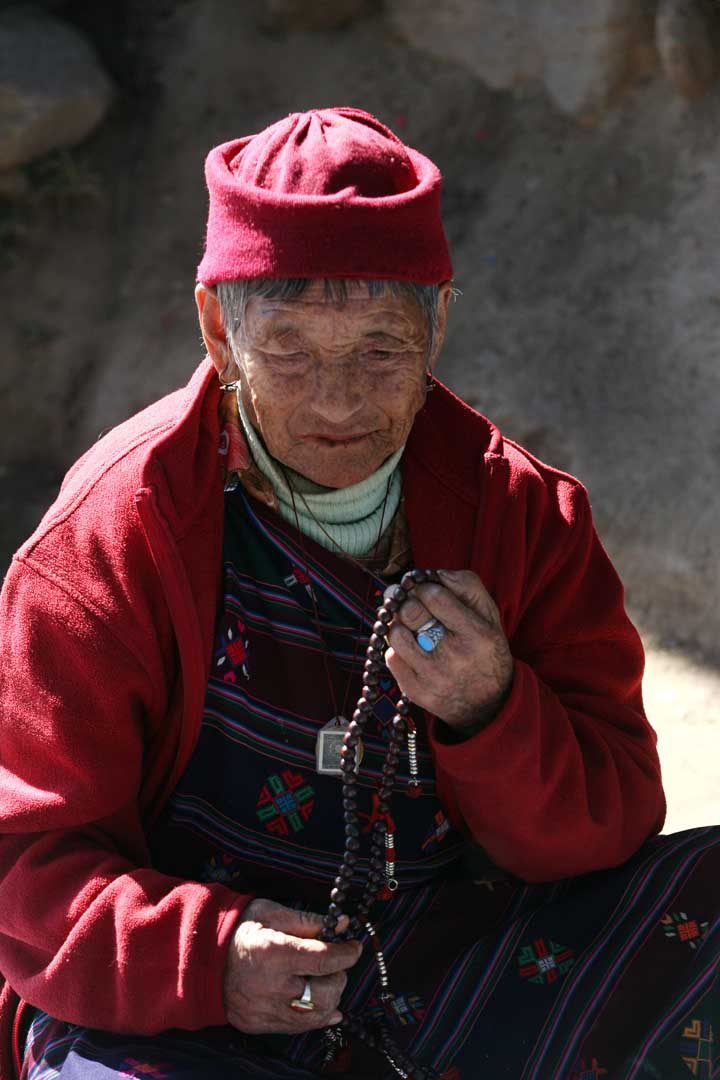
A Bhutanese Buddhist woman doing Japa, with Japamala

Japa (Sanskrit: जप) is the meditative repetition of a mantra or a divine name. It is a practice found in Hinduism, Jainism, Sikhism, and Buddhism, with parallels found in other religions.

Japa may be performed while sitting in a meditation posture, while performing other activities, or as part of formal worship in group settings. The mantra or name may be spoken softly, loud enough for the practitioner to hear it, or it may be recited silently within the practitioner's mind.

== Etymology ==
The Sanskrit word japa is derived from the root jap-, meaning "to utter in a low voice, repeat internally, mutter". It can be further defined as ja to destroy birth, death, and reincarnation and pa meaning to destroy ones sins.

Monier-Williams states that the term appears in Vedic literature such as in the Aitareya Brahmana (Rigveda) and the Shatapatha Brahmana (Yajurveda). The term means muttering, whispering or murmuring passages from the scripture, or charms, or names of deity. Often it is the repetitive singing of a verse or mantra, sometimes counted with the help of a rosary which is called japamala. A related word, japana appears in Book 12 of the Mahabharata, where muttering prayers is described as a form of religious offering.

The concept of japa is also found in early Buddhist texts, and is very common in Tibetan Buddhism literature.

According to the sage Patanjali (400 CE), Japa is not the repetition of word or phase but rather contemplation on the meaning of the mantra; this definition sometimes persists across different sources.

== Varieties ==
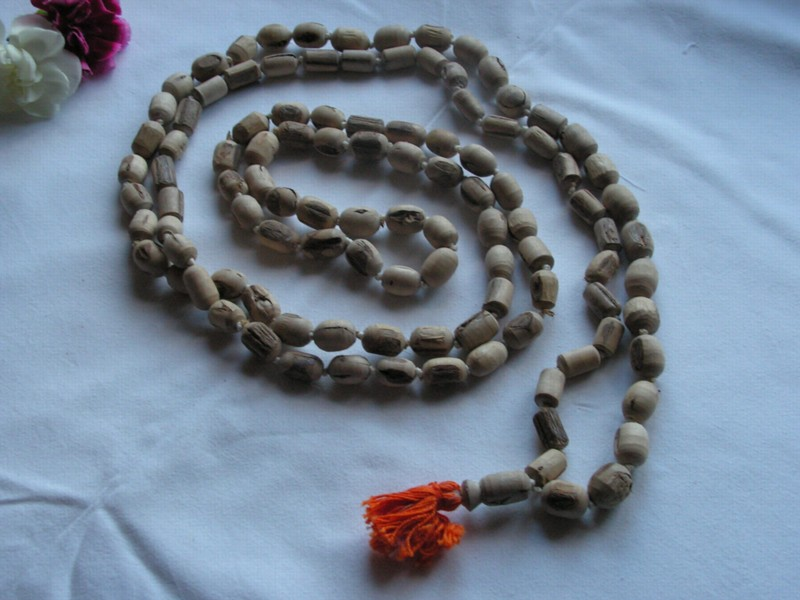
Japamala, Japa beads, consisting of 108 beads plus the head bead

=== Beads ===
In some forms of japa, the repetitions are counted using a string of beads known as a japamala. Many different types of materials are used for japa. The number of beads in the japamala is generally 108. It is not uncommon for people to wear japa beads around their neck, although some practitioners prefer to carry them in a bead-bag in order to keep them clean.

=== Degrees of loudness ===
Japa may be performed in varying degrees of loudness:

- Vaikhari japa is spoken loud enough so that, although this is not why it is so loud (unless it is a group japa session), nearby people can hear it recited. It may be useful when there are other sounds nearby (though some consider this to be a mistake) or when concentration is difficult and is thus considered most suitable for beginners.
- Upamshu japa is said quietly, at a whisper. It is said to be one hundred times more effective than vaikhari japa. During upamshu japa the practitioner's lips should barely move so it is difficult for an observer to see that anything is being said.
- Manasika japa is recited in the mind. It is said to be one thousand times more effective than upamshu japa and thus 100 000 times more effective than vaikhari japa. It is also said to be difficult or impossible to practice for those who are not already grounded in vaikhari japa practice.

=== Likhita japa ===
Likhita japa is the writing of a mantra while, usually, reciting it aloud at the same time. Proponents say it is more effective than simply reciting the mantra aloud. Likhita japa is often written in a book dedicated to the purpose. Books intended for shorter mantras have a grid of rectangular cells with each cell holding one instance of the mantra. Practitioners may use different coloured ink to write in certain cells in order to make a decorative or symbolic pattern.

=== Mantracakras ===
Tibetan Buddhists include japa meditation as a large part of their religious practices. In Tibet, states Harvey Alper, the prayer wheels are instruments for japa. The practice of nembutsu in Pure Land Buddhism is analogous to japa.

== Aims ==
The stated aim, or goal of japa may vary greatly depending on the mantra involved and the religious philosophy of the practitioner. In both Buddhist and Hindu traditions mantras may be given to aspirants by their guru, after some form of initiation. The stated goal could be moksha, nirvana, bhakti, or simple personal communion with a divine power in a similar way to prayer. Many gurus and other spiritual teachers, and other religious leaders, especially Hindu and Buddhist, teach that these represent different names for the same transformed state of consciousness. However, this claim is not made about mantras that are not intended for spiritual growth and self-realization. (Note: For example, when used for magical or occult purposes.)

After long use of a mantra that is intended to foster self-realization or intimacy with a divine power, an individual may reach a state of ajapa japa, or lit. 'repetitionless repetition', wherein the mantra "repeats itself" in the mind. Similar states have been reached by adherents to other major faith traditions, using prayers from their own traditions.

== Analogues in other traditions ==
Some Catholic prayer forms that involve repetition, such as the use of the Rosary or one of various chaplets, are similar to japa, such as Hesychasm in Eastern Christianity, although the practices are not identical because their aims differ. Mental methods of repeated short prayers, very similar to japa are also used in Christian traditions, most notably the practice of repeating the Jesus Prayer found in the Eastern Orthodox Church. Moreover, the goal of ajapa japa is quite similar to the Christian aim of "unceasing prayer". The practice of dhikr by Sufis is similar to japa. The two main Sikh scriptures open with sections named after the term, and these are called Japji Sahib and Jaap Sahib.

== See also ==
Popular Japa mantras

- Om
- Mahamrityunjaya (mantra)
- Om Namah Sivaya
- Gayatri (mantra)
- Hare Krishna (mantra)
- Nam-myōhō-renge-kyō
- Om Mani Padme Hum
- Om Namo Bhagavate Vasudevaya
- Om Namo Narayanaya
- Om Tare Tuttare Ture Svaha
- Sri Ram Jay Ram Jay Jay Ram
- Swaminarayan (mantra)

General

- Ajapa japa
- Japamala
- Nama sankeerthanam
- Nembutsu
- Pranava yoga
- Dhikr
- Hesychasm
- Jesus Prayer
- Meditation
- Prayer

== Bibliography ==
- Alper, Harvey P. (1991). Understanding Mantras. Motilal Banarsidass. p. 440. ISBN 978-81-208-0746-4.
- Apte, Vaman Shivaram (1890). A Practical Sanskrit-English Dictionary. p. 447.
- Ashley, Thomas (2006). Chakra Mantras: Liberate Your Spiritual Genius Through Chanting (1 ed.). San Francisco: Farrand Weiser Books. p. 11. ISBN 9781578633678.
- Beck, Guy L. (1995). Sonic Theology: Hinduism and Sacred Sound. Motilal Banarsidass. pp. 92–93, 132–134. ISBN 978-81-208-1261-1.
- BhaktiratnaSadhu (17 January 2020). "Hare Krishna Japa Should be Upamshu or Very Soft". raadhaa.com. Archived from the original on 2020-10-24.
- Chapple, Christopher Key (2015). Yoga in Jainism. Taylor & Francis. pp. 311–312. ISBN 978-1-317-57217-6.
- Dasgupta, Shashi Bhushan; Dasgupta, Sashibhusan (1958). An Introduction to Tāntric Buddhism. Calcutta University Press. pp. 167–168.
- Deol, S (1998). Japji: The Path of Devotional Meditation. Mount Meru Books. p. 11. ISBN 978-0966102703.
- Easwaran, Eknath (2008) [1977]. Mantram Handbook (5th ed.). Tomales, CA: Nilgiri Press. ISBN 978-1-58638-028-1.
- Keshavadas, Sant (1990). Gāyatrī, the Highest Meditation. Motilal Banarsidass. p. 16. ISBN 9788120806979.
- Kohli, S.S. (1993). The Sikh and Sikhism. Atlantic Publishers. pp. 33–34.
- Monier-Williams, Monier (2005). Sanskṛit-English dictionary: etymologically and philologically arranged with special reference to cognate Indo-European languages (Corrected ed.). Delhi: Motilal Banarsidass. p. 412. ISBN 978-8120831056.
- Padoux, Andre (2011). Tantric Mantras: Studies on Mantrasastra (1 ed.). Routledge. pp. 31–53. ISBN 978-1-136-70757-5.
- Sjögren, Per-Olof (1996) [1966]. The Jesus prayer: Lord Jesus Christ, son of God, have mercy upon me (3 ed.). London: Society for Promoting Christian Knowledge. ISBN 0-281-04957-2.
- Poddar, Hanumanprasad (1975). The divine name and its practice (13th ed.). Gorakhpur, India: Gita Press. ASIN B0007ALM2S.
- Oman, Doug; Driskill, Joseph D. (2003). "Holy name repetition as a spiritual exercise and therapeutic technique". Journal of Psychology and Christianity. 22 (1): 5–19.
- Raghavan, V. (2011). The Power of the Sacred Name: Indian Spirituality Inspired by Mantras. World Wisdom, Inc. p. 43. ISBN 9781935493969.
- Saraswati, Krishnananda (1986). Facets of Spirituality: Dialogues and Discourses of Swami Krishnananda. Delhi: Motilal Banarsidass. p. 181. ISBN 9788120800878.
- Saraswati, Sivananda (1981). Japa Yoga: a comprehensive treatise on mantra-sastra. Shivanandanagar, India: Divine Life Society. ISBN 81-7052-018-5.
- Singha, HS (2009). The Encyclopedia of Sikhism. Hemkunt Press. p. 110. ISBN 978-8170103011.
- Tulpule, Shankar Gopal (1991). The Divine name in the Indian tradition. New Delhi, India: Indus Publishing Company / Indian Institute of Advanced Study. ISBN 81-85182-50-7.
- "How is It Possible to Chant While Performing Various Activities?". www.spiritualresearchfoundation.org. Spiritual Science Research Foundation. n.d.
