= Gondavale =

Village in Maharashtra

Gondavale is a small town in Satara district, Maharashtra, India, 64 km (40 mi) from Satara.The town is mainly known for the shrine (Sansthan) and other places associated with Brahmachaitanya, a Hindu saint who died in early part of the 20th century.

== Shri Samartha Sansthan Gondavale (Sansthan) ==
The temple or Sansthan of Brahmachaitanya, who devoted his entire life toward propagating Naamasmaran ( Ram Naam Mantra - Shri Ram Jai Ram Jai Jai Ram) . Over the last 100+ years, after its formation in 1913, the Sansthan has grown significantly. The Sansthan is managed by four elected trustees and Brahmachaitanya as the permanent first trustee. There are hundreds of volunteers and monks who carry out several tasks under the guidance of the trustees. The trustees have been ensuring that Brahmachaitanya's teachings are carried out to the letter and that there is warmth among the devotees and the whole ambience of the Sansthan is one of piety and contentment. Over its existence, the Sansthan has faced many difficult periods such as food rationing, water shortages, financial issues, and political pressure. The two pillars - Ram Naam and Annadan (Food donation) - are the culture and religion of the Sansthan. Thousands of devotees visit the Sansthan every year.

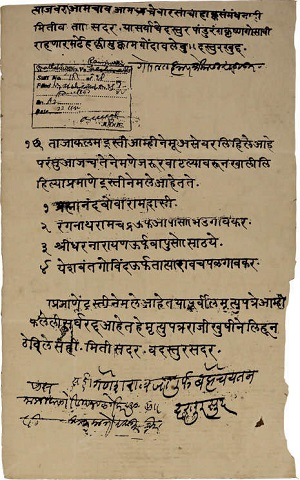
Trust Deed

=== History ===
In 1912 - one year before his death - Brahmachaitanya created a Will in which he bequeathed all his wealth and estate including land, cattle & livestock to a Trust. The Trust is dedicated to spreading Ram Naam, Annadan (food donation), Gorakshan (cow protection), and maintenance of various temples. Brahmachaitanya appointed four trustees to administer the Trust after his death - Brahmananda, as the head trustee, and Appasaheb Bhadgaokar, Bapusaheb Sathye and Tatya Chapalgaonkar as the executive trustees. Accordingly, the trustees took charge after Brahmachaitanya's death in December 1913. They named Brahmachaitanya as the first and permanent trustee and began their work. Brahmananda named this Trust as "Shri Samartha Sansthan Gondavale". Ever since its formation in 1913 to date, the Sansthan has been fortunate to receive services from several trustees and sevekari sadhaks (volunteers). They come from all walks of life - rich / poor, farmers, doctors, engineers, business executives etc. "Generation after generation of devotees have served as trustees / sevekaris.

=== Shrines and monuments ===
==== Brahmachaitanya Maharaj's Samadhi ====
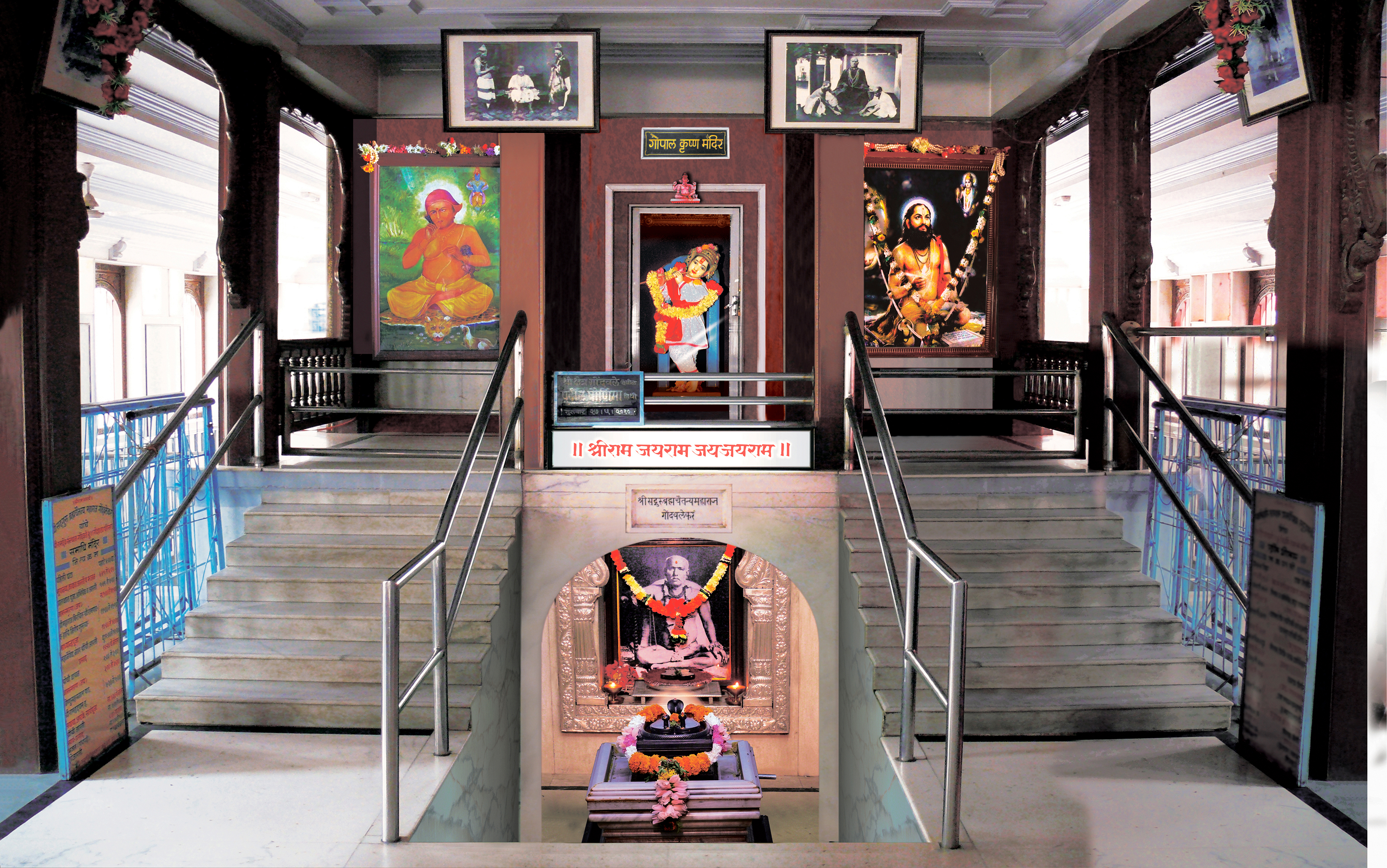
Sampurna Samadhi

A day prior to his death, Sri Brahmachaitanya Maharaj visited his cattle house and said he wanted to live at that site permanently. Brahmananda, Dr. Kurtakoti, and other disciples took this as a hint and decided to build his samadhi at that site after Brahmachaitanya maharaj's death. Brahmachaitanya's samadhi is modeled after the samadhi of Samaratha Ramdas Swami, Sajjangadh. Accordingly, a Gopal Krishna temple is built above the samadhi. The samadhi is decorated with only one ornament - flowers from the Sansthan's nursery. Brahmananda personally supervised and guided the construction until its completion in 1918. He also established best practices for sadhana and daily pooja Ever since then, the samadhi is the central point of all the activities of the Sansthan. "

Aaisaheb Samadhi Aairsaheb's samadhi is located toward the north side of Brahmachaitanya's samadhi. Its construction was completed in 1935.

Kothi The Kothi, also known as Brahmananda's Kothi, is the pantry used for storing food and grocery items for prasad. Brahmananda has blessed the Kothi with an Akshay Pishavi and a silver one rupee coin. He told the trustees to perform pooja of the Akshay Pishavi before every celebration so that the Sansthan would not run out of food to feed any number of visitors.

Battasha Samadhi "Battasha" was Brahmachaitanya's horse. He would allow only Brahmachaitanya to ride on him and not anyone else. According to the trustees" a few days after Aaisaheb died, Battasha walked in front of Brahmachaitanya's samadhi and died." His Samadhi is constructed at that location.

Ramanand Maharaj Samadhi Ramananda Maharaj was also a known Pandurangbua. His samadhi is located toward the north side of Brahmachaitnya's samadhi.

Naam Mandir This is one place in the Sansthan where sadhak can seek solitude for Naamasmaran. This mandir is located near Ramanand Maharaj's samadhi.

Prasad Mandap

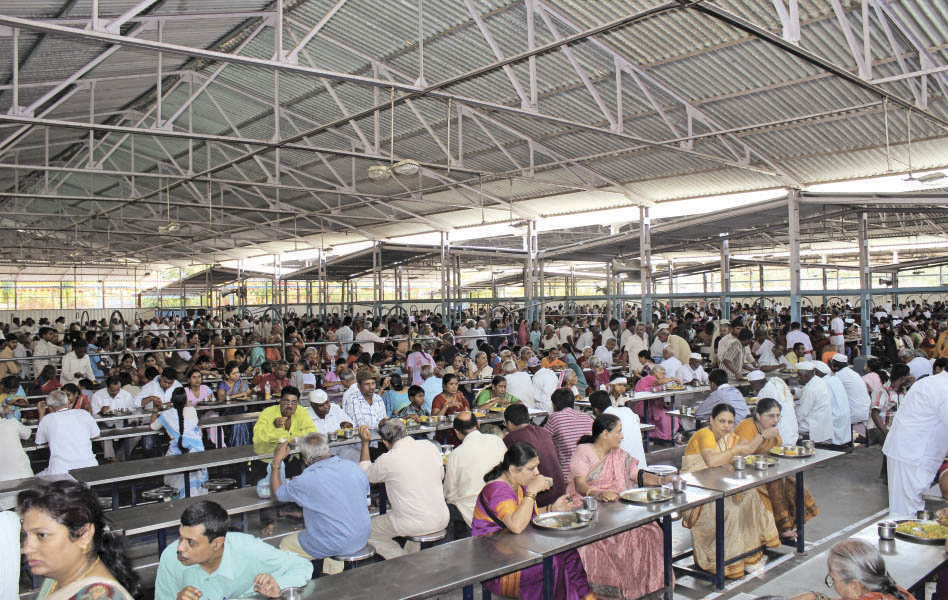
Prasad Mandap

Annadan is the main activity of the Sansthan. There are five prasad mandaps where "thousands of devotees enjoy the prasad with Brahmachaitanya's krupa every day" according to the trustees. As an example, around 38,000 devotees enjoyed the prasad on the centenary day in 2013. The kitchen is equipped with facilities such as boilers, cold storage to cook prasad for 3,000 devotees in one shot.

Brahmananda Hall Brahmananda Hall is a hall where the devotees chant Ram Naam as well as enjoy discourses/kirtans. A number of kirtankars, musicians, and artists have performed their seva toward Brahmachaitanya in this hall.

==== Other Temples in Gondavale ====
The Sansthan is responsible for the pooja and maintenance of the temples founded by Brahmachaitanya in Gondavale. In addition to the two Ram temples, the temples include: The Vitthal temple, and the Datta temple (it also contains Durgadevi and Narasimha temples) and Shani temple.

==== Museum ====
Brahmachaitanya's ancestral home is now converted into a museum to display various artifacts, documents, photos, clothing, and furniture that provide insights into Brahmachaitanya's life and teachings. Sadhak Nivas

Sadhak Nivas is a residential facility, available free of cost, to anyone who wants to stay in Gondavale and perform Ram Naam Sadhana. It is equipped with essential facilities for physically challenged devotees as well. It can host over 1,000 sadhak families.

== Community projects ==
=== Chaitanya Hospital ===
Sansthan commenced a hospital in the premises of the Samadhi Mandir in the year 1983 under the supervision of Dr. Appa Aathavale. On 1 May 1994, Dr. Ghanekar, who was managing trustee of Sansthan at that time, expanded the facility further. The new hospital is well-equipped with 69 operation theatres and is now known as "Chaitanya Hospital". There are multiple facilities offered at the hospital. The medical treatment offered at Chaitanya Hospital is "Free of Cost".

=== Goshala ===
Brahmachaitanya had great affection for cows and was well known to protect them and take care of them during his time. The tradition is continued till date by Sansthan. Earlier Goshala had 6-7 Cows, but a new modern goshala is built behind the Kurtakoti building and has more than 50 cows.The practice of showing 'Gogras' (feeding first bite of food to cows) by performing Gomata Aarti during Kakad Aarti in the morning and evening was started by Brahmachaitanya continues till today. Next to it is a new state-of-the-art garbage dump, bio-gas plant. It is best used to heat milk over a slow fire.

=== Water management ===
Gondavale has always experienced water scarcity due to its geographical location. Devotees of Brahmachaitanya have undertaken various projects to see that Gondavale and adjacent areas get enough supply of water throughout the year. Two water reservoirs are built which have a capacity to hold up to 3 crore liters of water. A very innovative water distribution system is implemented without using a single water pump.

=== Service during COVID-19 pandemic ===
Gondavale Sansthan has been actively contributing to various health and social causes during the COVID-19 pandemic situation.

These include:

- Donation of 50 Lac Rupees to the Prime minister relief fund.
- Donation 25 Lac Rupees to the Sasoon hospital, Pune for the treatment of COVID-19 patients.
- Contribution of 25 Lac Rupees to the Chief minister relief fund to help health care workers and first responders.
- During the COVID-19 lockdown, the sansthan provided food packets worth 50 lac rupees to more than 9000 underprivileged families for 3 months with the help of local government officials.
- When COVID-19 patients started increasing in Satara District, Sansthan, local villagers and various local organizations quickly started COVID-19 treatment center with 30 oxygen beds and quarantine facility for 100 patients.
