= Trailanga =

Hindu yogi and mystic

Trailinga Swami
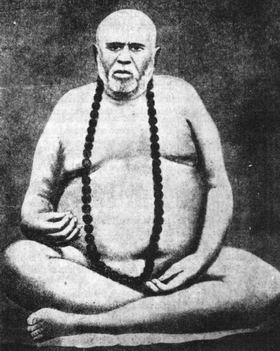
- Trailinga Swami

Personal life
- Born: 1607 (claimed) Vizianagaram, India
- Died: 26 December 1887 (allegedly age 280) Varanasi, British India
- Cause of death: Old age
- Known for: Spiritual teachings
- Occupation: Saint, Spiritual teacher

Religious life
- Religion: Hinduism

Trailinga Swami (also known as Tailang Swami or Telang Swami) was a Hindu yogi and mystic who lived in Varanasi India.

In Autobiography of a Yogi, Paramahansa Yogananda introduces Trailanga Swami as a famous 300-pound swami who mysteriously rarely ate and lived daily life in the nude, "utterly unconscious of his nakedness". He was thought to have lived for over 300 years, to drink deadly poisons with no ill effect, and to sit atop or below the Ganges for long periods of time; all proving that he "lived by divine consciousness."
