= Saunshi =

Saunshi Saunshi
- Village
- Location in Karnataka, India Saunshi (India)
- Coordinates: 15°13′N 75°18′E
- Country: India
- State: Karnataka
- District: Dharwad
- Talukas: Kundgol

Government
  - Type: Panchayat raj
  - Body: Gram panchayat

Population (2022)
  - Total: 24,960

Languages
  - Official: Kannada
- Time zone: UTC+5:30 (IST)
- PIN: 581117
- Telephone code: 918304
- ISO 3166 code: IN-KA
- Vehicle registration: KA25
- Nearest city: Hubli.
- Website: karnataka.gov.in

Saunshi is a village in the northern state of Karnataka, India. It is located in the Kundgol taluk of Dharwad district in Karnataka. It is the largest gram Panchayat in Dharwad District.

== Demographics ==
As of the 2011 Census of India there were 2,681 households in Saunshi and a total population of 12,848 consisting of 6,501 males and 6,347 females. There were 1,415 children ages 0–6.

== Temples ==
Karisiddeshwar temple, veerkthmath, Fakkireshwara Temple, Shri Guru Brahmananda Temple, Dattatreya Temple, Shri Shankarlinga Temple, Shri Shiddharoad Temple, Sri Siddeshwara temple, Shri Veerabhadreshwara Temple, Anjaneya Temple.

== Transportation ==
Bus routes between Hubli to Laxmeswara stop at saunshi, which is centrally located between the two cities. KSRTC buses stop at Saunshi.

There are several daily express and passenger trains between Hubli and Bangalore that stop at Saunshi.

== village information ==
The village also has government primary health centre (PHC), KLE PU and Degree college, government and private high school and primary schools, government ITI college facilities.

- Dharwad
- Districts of Karnataka

Aditi prabhudeva the actress is from saunshi. Her original name is sudeepana Banakar.
