= Bhava samadhi =

State of ecstatic consciousness

Bhava Samadhi is a state of ecstatic consciousness that can sometimes be a seemingly spontaneous experience, but is recognized generally to be the culmination of long periods of devotional practices. It is believed by some groups to be evoked through the presence of "higher beings." "Bhava" means "feeling", "emotion", "mood", "mental attitude" or "devotional state of mind." "Samadhi" is a state of consciousness in which the mind becomes completely still (one-pointed or concentrated) and the consciousness of the experiencing subject becomes one with the experienced object. Thus, "bhava samadhi" denotes an advanced spiritual state in which the emotions of the mind are channelled into one-pointed concentration and the practitioner experiences devotional ecstasy. Bhava samadhi has been experienced by notable figures in Indian spiritual history, including Sri Ramakrishna Paramahamsa and some of his disciples, Chaitanya Mahaprabhu and his chief associate Nityananda, Mirabai, Kundalini Guru Shri Anandi Ma, and numerous saints in the bhakti tradition.

== Meaning ==
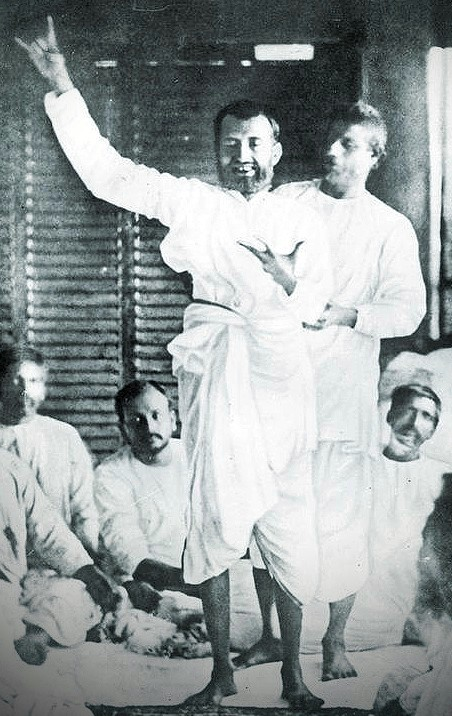
Ramakrishna in samadhi at the house of Keshab Chandra Sen. He is seen supported by his nephew Hriday and surrounded by brahmo devotees.

Bhava samadhi, sometimes translated as 'trance', has no direct counterpart in the English language, though "ecstasy" is the closest translation. The various translations that have been proposed all refer to an ecstatic state of consciousness, which is attained by channelling the emotions into one-pointed concentration. For example, in The Gospel of Sri Ramakrishna, the author, M., later identified as Mahendranath Gupta, recounts observing Ramakrishna Paramahamsa's introverted mood in which he became "unconscious of the outer world." M. later "learnt that this mood is called bhava, ecstasy."

"Bhava" denotes the mood of ecstasy and self-surrender which is induced by the maturing of devotion to one's 'Ishta deva' (object of devotion). "Bhava" literally means feeling, emotion, mood, or devotional state of mind. This refers to the aspirant's emotional life, which in the practice of jnana or raja yoga is controlled in order to transcend the spheres of the mind and intellect. In bhakti yoga, however, bhava is neither controlled nor suppressed, but is transformed into devotion and channelled to the Lord." Swami Sivananda states it is an "internal feeling" that needs to be developed through proper practice just like any other faculty of the mind e.g. memory or will power.

According to Ramakrishna Paramahamsa real bhava can only be said to occur when the relationship with the Divine is so established that it remains fixed in our consciousness at all times, "whether eating, drinking, sitting or sleeping."

Only when the bhava has fully ripened does the sadhaka (spiritual seeker) experience "bhava samadhi." Bhava samadhi occurs when the emotions are perfectly channelled into one-pointed concentration on the object of one's devotion. It has also been described as "Absorption in meditation due to emotional cause, e.g. kirtan [devotional music]" and "sheer ecstasy, a condition caused when the heart is seized by the Divine embrace."

Devotional practices that can evoke bhava, such as "bhajans" and kirtan (spiritual music), are standard practices in the bhakti tradition, and in the missions of many Indian saints including Ramakrishna Paramahamsa and Shivabalayogi Maharaj. Shivabalayogi often used the words "bhava" and "bhava samadhi" interchangeably. He explained bhava as follows:

"Everyone is in some sort of bhava of the guru because of their attachment to the guru. The mind's attachment and devotion is the true bhava." “Bhava is the beginning for samadhi and tapas. Higher souls induce it. Bhava helps in physical, mental, and spiritual progress."

The qualities required for a genuine bhava samadhi have been emphasized by Ramakrishna Paramahamsa when he said that while lower spiritual experiences may arise from "the momentary exuberance of emotions" bhava samadhi cannot be sustained unless worldly desires have been removed and proper qualities have been established like renunciation and detachment.

== Misuse and controversy ==
There have been many misuses and controversies associated with bhava samadhi. Firstly, bhava itself has been mistaken to be an advanced spiritual state, whereas the great exponent of bhava samadhi, Ramakrishna Paramahamsa, made it clear to his disciple, Swami Vivekananda, that bhava is a preliminary state of consciousness:

"Witnessing the religious ecstasy (bhava) of several devotees, Narendra (Swami Vivekananda) one day said to the Master that he too wanted to experience it. 'My child,' he was told, 'when a huge elephant enters a small pond, a great commotion is set up, but when it plunges into the Ganga, the river shows very little agitation. These devotees are like small ponds; a little experience makes their feelings flow over the brim. But you are a huge river.' "

Several other times Ramakrishna Paramahamsa made the same point like when he told one of his close devotees Gopalchandra Ghosh (later known as Swami Advaitananda, his most senior monastic disciple) that it was not so important to experience such a temporary ecstasy (bhava) and that on the spiritual path "true faith and renunciation are far greater."

That bhava is a preliminary experience has also been emphasized by Shivabalayogi Maharaj:

"During this all your bhava (the mind’s feelings) will get concentrated on your favorite deity and thus your mind becomes more concentrated, more single-pointed. Then meditation itself becomes much easier and consequently one would take up meditation more willingly. "It's like giving chocolate to a child to make it go to school. But one should not settle just for the chocolate - one must go on to school. In the same way, one must meditate."

Secondly, people have falsely claimed to have spontaneously attained spiritual powers and experiences through bhava, whereas bhava samadhi is the culmination of a long period of devotional practice. Bhava has even been used by people to falsely claim that they are "possessed by sacred deities" and to issue orders on behalf of these deities. If the bhava is genuine, however, the person will become non-violent and introverted, and will not claim or give instructions through bhava. Spiritual efforts should always enable the mind to recede and become quiet, going introverted toward the Self. Swami Vivekananda warned sadhaks (spiritual aspirants) to beware of claims made of bhava experiences:

He pointed out that Ramakrishna had been through long years of strictest self discipline and that his ecstasy was a fruit of that discipline, not a superficial emotionalism. "When people try to practice religion," said Naren "eighty percent of them turn into cheats, and about fifteen percent go mad. Its only the remaining five percent who get some direct knowledge of the Truth and so become blessed. So Beware."

Thirdly, genuine bhava samadhi, which is an internal state of consciousness, has been identified with outer movements of the body, such as dancing and singing. It has been claimed that "the very nature of bhava itself - sometimes having such vigorous outward expression in action and movement - had always meant that those who wished attention or status in a group would sometimes simply pretend to be in bhava to obtain some personal gain." However, it has been made clear by Ramakrishna that emotional displays do not constitute spiritual experience:

One evening Subodh (later to become Swami Subodhananda) observed the devotees dancing and singing Kirtan in the Masters room at Dakshineshwar. They were overwhelmed with devotion. Shri Ramakrishna himself joined them and his ecstasy surcharged the whole place with heavenly bliss. Some were crying, some laughing, some dancing. Others were transfixed like motionless statues, and some began to roll on the floor. Subodh was very skeptical about this kind of emotional display ... [He asked] "who had real ecstasy in the kirtan today?" The Master thought for a while and then said, "Today Latu (later to become Swami Adbhutananda) alone had the fullest measure of it; some others had sprinklings."

The depth of bhava experience varies across different individuals and depends on the spiritual maturity of their minds. Mature sadhaks usually do not display outward signs of bhava, which are indicative of the depth of their experiences. The problem of devotees attempting to make claims about their inner state of consciousness by imitating external indicators of genuine bhava samadhi was addressed by Swami Vivekananda in the Ramakrishna Mission:

It was discovered that several were actually trying to induce the outer physical symptoms of Samadhi and also imitate the movements of one who is dancing in ecstasy. Naren reasoned with these devotees and persuaded them to stop starving themselves and eat wholesome food, and to try control their emotions instead of cultivating hysteria. The result was an increase in spirituality and a decrease in outer show.

The actions of people in bhava samadhi, like dancing in ecstasy, can appear very strange to some. In Shri Shivabalayogi Maharaj's mission various levels of bhava occurred to hundreds of people. Bhava was controversial throughout Shivabalayogi's public programs, and his own statements on the phenomenon appear inconsistent. Although some were acting or misusing the experience, when people complained to Sri Shivabalayogi, he was intolerant of most criticism or interference. "It is not drama. It really happens."

To place bhava samadhi into the correct spiritual context Ramakrishna Paramahansa said,

"If the depth of spiritual experiences is to be measured, it must be done from observing one's steadfastness, renunciation, strength of character, the attenuation of desires for enjoyment etc. It is by this touchstone alone, and no other means, that the amount of dross in ecstasy can be assessed."

== Sources ==
- Swami Sivananda, www.sivanandaonline.org
- Shri Shiva Rudra Balayogi, The Path Supreme, 2010
- Swami Devananda, Meditation and Mantras, Motilal Banarsidass publishers,1978
- Jestice, Phyllis G, Holy People of the World: A Cross-cultural Encyclopedia, 2004
- Swami Saradananda, Shri Ramakrishna: The Great Master. (India, Madras, 1952)
- Swami Bhaskarananda, Meditation, Mind and Patanjali's Yoga, Viveka Press, 2001.
- Swami Chetananda, God Lived with Them, Vedanta Society of St. Louis, 1997.
- Isherwood, C., Ramakrishna and His Disciples, Vedanta Press, 1980.
- M., The Gospel of Sri Ramakrishna, Ramakrishna-Vivekananda Center, 1942.
- Lt. Gen. Hanut Singh, Shri Shri Shri Shivabalayogi Maharaj: Life & Spiritual Ministration, India 1980, reprinted India 2008.
- Young, Bruce, Guru-Disciple, 2008.
- Palotas, Thomas L., Divine Play, the Silent Teaching of Shivabalayogi, Lotus Press, 2004.
- Palotas, Thomas L., Swamiji's Treasure, God Realization & Experiences of Shivabalayogi, Handloom, 2007
