= Sat Sandarbhas =

Sanskrit text

- Author: Jiva Goswami
- Original title: Ṣaṭ Sandarbha (षट्संदर्भ)
- Language: Sanskrit
- Series: Six Sandarbhas
- Subject: Vaishnavism, Vedanta, Bhakti
- Genre: Philosophy, Theology
- Published: 16th century
- Publication place: India
- Preceded by: Preliminary work by Gopala Bhatta Goswami
- Followed by: Krama-sandarbha (sometimes considered the 7th Sandarbha)

Sat Sandarbhas (Six Sandarbhas, a.k.a. Bhāgavata-sandarbha) is a 16th-century Vaishnava Sanskrit text, authored by Gaudiya Vaishnava theologian Jiva Goswami. The six treatises are Tattva-, Bhagavat-, Paramatma-, Krishna-, Bhakti-, and Priti-sandarbha. Jiva's Krama-sandarbha commentary on the Bhagavata Purana is often described as the "seventh" of the six sandarbhas.

The Six Sandarbhas are sometimes called the Bhagavata-sandarbha, not to be confused with the second treatise titled Bhagavat-sandarbha. The word "sandarbha" literally means "weaving" or "arranging"; the Bhagavata-sandarbha, his main philosophical work, is a thematic arrangement of the Bhagavata Purana, which presents Chaitanya Vaishnavism in a systematic and comprehensive way. Gupta places this composition as an early work due to references in later works such as Radha-krsnarcana-dipika, Krama-sandarbha, Dig-darsini, Durgama-sangamini, and Gopalacampu. Brzezinski dates the composition between Jiva's Madhava-mahotsava in 1555 and published praises of Jiva in 1561.

According to Jiva Goswami, Gopala Bhatta Goswami had already done the preliminary work on Sat Sandarbhas, but did not complete it. Jiva took the work of Gopala Bhatta and expanded it into six parts, systematically presenting the philosophy of Chaitanya Mahaprabhu and providing scriptural evidence. Jiva Goswami also wrote an extensive commentary to the first four sandarbhas called Sarva-samvadini. The Jiva Institute of Dr. Satyanarayana Dasa based in Vrindavan is engaged in what Lucian Wong calls an "ambitious Sandarbha translation project".

== Manuscript transmission and textual history ==
The composition of the Ṣaṭ Sandarbhas is dated to c. 1555–1561. The primary repository was the library (pustak-bhāṇḍār) of the Rādhā-Dāmodara temple in Vrindavan, housing Jīva's manuscripts alongside works inherited from Rūpa, Sanātana, and Raghunātha Dāsa. Jīva secured protection for these collections via a 1568 farman from Akbar brokered by Todar Mal, and a 1608 Sanskrit testamentary will outlining institutional succession.

During Aurangzeb's reign in the late 17th century, the Rādhā-Dāmodara icons and library were relocated to Eastern Rajasthan under Kachwaha protection, establishing manuscript centers in Jaipur, Alwar, and Jodhpur.

The manuscript tradition divides into two regional branches:

1. A western branch in Devanāgarī across Rajasthan and Vraja;
2. An eastern branch in Bengali script across Bengal and Dhaka.

The first printed edition collating multiple manuscripts was edited by Pūridāsa and published in Calcutta in 1950.

== Hermeneutical methodology and sources ==
=== Application of the six indicators of purport ===
To prove Bhagavān is the sole import of the Bhāgavata Purāṇa, Jīva applies the six classical indicators of textual purport (tātparya-liṅga):

1. Initial and concluding statements (upakrama-upasaṃhāra): Shows concordance between verse 1.1.1 and 12.13.19, both ending with satyaṃ paraṃ dhīmahi.
2. Repetition (abhyāsa): Cites 12.12.66 to show Bhagavān is praised across every narrative.
3. Novelty (apūrvatā): Delivers revelation inaccessible to perception or inference.
4. Result (phala): Identifies the fruit as liberation and devotional love (prema), citing 2.2.37.
5. Commendatory statement (arthavāda): Highlights eulogies praising the Lord, such as 12.13.1.
6. Reasoning (upapatti): Uses verse 2.2.35 to establish Bhagavān via invariable concomitance (vyāpti) and untenability (anupapatti).

=== Engagement with earlier commentators ===
Jīva constructs arguments in the Sandarbhas by synthesizing earlier Vedāntic traditions:

- Śrīdhara Svāmī: Śrīdhara's Bhāvārtha-dīpikā is cited extensively. While accepting Śrīdhara as an authority who accommodated Advaitins, Jīva rejects his Advaitic readings. Notably, Jīva refutes Śrīdhara's gloss on Bhāgavata 1.1.1 interpreting creation as illusory superimposition (āropa), defending the real transformation of divine potency (śakti-pariṇāmavāda).
- Rāmānuja: For definitions and refutations of pure non-dualism in the Catuḥsūtrī Ṭīkā, Jīva draws directly upon Rāmānuja's Śrībhāṣya, adopting his arguments on the qualified nature of Brahman and the priority of scriptural revelation (śabda) over independent logic.
- Madhvācārya: Jīva cites Madhva's works (such as the Bhāgavata-tātparya-nirṇaya) for Purāṇic variants, citations of lost texts, and distinct readings of sūtras such as samanvayāt and īkṣater nāśabdam.

== The six Sandarbhas ==
Ravi Gupta classifies the six Sandarbhas as follows: the first four are concerned mainly with the knowledge of and relationships between God, living entities, and the world. This is known as sambandha-jñāna. The fifth, Bhakti-sandarbha, deals with abhidheya, how to revive the personal relationship between the living entity and God. The sixth, Prīti-sandarbha, is about prayojana, which is the "ultimate perfected state of pure love for Krishna". In the first three Sandarbhas, Jiva writes in a non-sectarian way; it is only after establishing his position on ontological issues that he identifies the divinity with Krishna in the Krishna-sandarbha.

=== 1. Tattva-sandarbha ===
Tattva-Sandarbha is a treatise on the various types of evidences (pramanas) used in Vedic philosophy, concluding that shabda (divine sound in the form of the Vedic scriptures) is the highest, and of all the scriptures, the Bhagavata Purana is the highest pointing to the Absolute Truth.

Consisting of 63 sections, it is the shortest and most widely read of the six Sandarbhas, and the only one that was commented upon by Baladeva Vidyabhushana. It is split into two parts: the pramāṇa-khaṇḍan and the prameya-khaṇḍa. The former concerns the methodology of the text, wherein Jiva attempts to show that shabda-pramana (verbal or scriptural testimony) is the best means of attaining knowledge, and that the Bhagavata Purana is the best in this category. The latter part describes Bhagavata Purana 1.7.4–11 and argues against the Advaita position.

English translations by:

- Stuart Elkman (1986)
- Kusakratha dasa (1987) (2007)
- Satyanarayana Dasa and Kundali Dasa (1995)
- Bhanu Swami (2012)
- Gopiparanadhana Dasa (2013)
- Satyanarayana dasa (2015)

Hindi translations by:

- Haridas Shastri (along with commentaries by Jiva Goswami, Baladeva Vidyabhushan, Radha Mohan Goswami, and Gaura Kishor Goswami) (Note: Haridasa Shastri tends to blend his commentary into the translation, along with excerpts from Jiva Goswami’s Sarva-samvadini.)
- Shyamlal Hakim (Shri Shyamdas)

=== 2. Bhagavat-sandarbha ===
Bhagavat-sandarbha distinguishes the impersonal aspect of Godhead (Brahman), the localized form of God within the heart of each living being (Paramatma), and the highest personal aspect of Godhead (Krishna or Bhagavan). It describes the spiritual realm of Krishna, the modes of material nature, the mode of pure goodness (visuddha-sattva), the importance of worshiping the deity of Krishna, and the eternal nature and qualities of the deity.

English translations by:

- Bhanu Swami (with commentary of Jiva Goswami)
- Satyanarayana dasa (with his own commentary)

Hindi translations by:

- Haridas Shastri
- Shyamlal Hakim (Shri Shyamdas)

=== 3. Paramatma-sandarbha ===
Paramatma-sandarbha (Paramātma-sandarbha) describes the characteristics of Paramatma (supersoul), and how he resides in all living entities in the universe. It discusses the nature of the materially conditioned living entities, the phenomenal material world, the illusory potency (Maya), the theory of transformation, the various avatars of Krishna, how Krishna reciprocates with his devotees, and how Krishna is characterized by six particular opulences.

English translations by:

- Bhanu Swami (with commentary of Jiva Goswami)
- Satyanarayana dasa (with his own commentary)

Hindi translations by:

- Haridas Shastri
- Shyamlal Hakim

==== The Catuḥsūtrī Ṭīkā and Vedāntic synthesis ====
The final portion of the Paramātma-sandarbha (anuccheda 105) contains an embedded commentary on the first four aphorisms (catuḥsūtrī) of the Brahma Sutras, extended to include the fifth sūtra (the Catuḥsūtrī Ṭīkā). In the Gauḍīya tradition, the Bhāgavata Purāṇa is held to be the natural, unartificial commentary (akṛtrima-bhāṣya) on the Brahma-sūtras, authored by Bādarāyaṇa himself; an independent, standalone commentary on the sūtras was therefore traditionally considered unnecessary.

To demonstrate that the Bhāgavata intrinsically embodies the core conclusions of Vedānta, Jīva maps the opening five sūtras directly onto the clauses of the opening verse of the Bhāgavata (1.1.1, janmādy asya yataḥ):

- 1.1.1 athāto brahma-jijñāsā is elucidated by satyaṃ paraṃ dhīmahi ("let us meditate upon the Supreme Truth"), defining Bhagavān as the supreme object of inquiry.
- 1.1.2 janmādy asya yataḥ directly correlates with the identical opening words of the verse, establishing the origin, maintenance, and dissolution of the cosmos.
- 1.1.3 śāstra-yonitvāt is explained via anvayād itarataś cārtheṣu (revelation through positive and negative concomitance) and tene brahma hṛdā ya ādi-kavaye (the transmission of Vedic knowledge to Brahmā).
- 1.1.4 tat tu samanvayāt is read alongside muhyanti yat sūrayaḥ ("about whom even the wise are bewildered"), arguing that complete scriptural harmony resides solely in the Supreme.
- 1.1.5 īkṣater nāśabdam is aligned with abhijñaḥ svarāṭ, refuting the Sāṅkhya proposition of an insentient material primal cause (pradhāna) by showing that the creator deliberately deliberates (īkṣ).

Through this correlation, Jīva established a foundational Vedāntic base for Gauḍīya theology well over a century before Baladeva Vidyabhushana composed the school's standalone commentary, the Govinda Bhashya.

=== 4. Krishna-sandarbha ===
Krishna-sandarbha (Kṛṣṇa-sandarbha) gives a number of quotes from various scriptures to prove that Krishna is the supreme god. It discusses the pastimes and qualities of Krishna as well as his avatars and functionary expansions. There is a description of Goloka, the planet of Krishna in relation to Vrindavana in the material sphere, the eternal associates of Krishna and their expansions, and a description of the Gopis and the topmost position of Radha among them.

English translations by:

- Bhanu Swami (with commentary of Jiva Goswami)
- Satyanarayana dasa (with his own commentary)

Hindi translations by:

- Haridas Shastri
- Shyamlal Hakim

=== 5. Bhakti-sandarbha ===
Bhakti-sandarbha explains how devotion to Krishna is directly executed, how the self is manifest through bhakti, the potency of imperfectly executed bhakti, the differences between a great and ordinary devotee, spontaneous love of god (raganuga-bhakti), the specific purpose of becoming a devotee of Krishna, and other perfectional stages. It discusses Varnashrama dharma (the socio-religious system established in scriptures), the superexcellent position of devotion to Krishna as compared to other conceptions such as yoga, and the worship of minor deities of the Hindu pantheon as being futile in comparison to the worship of Krishna's devotees. The text explains the liberation of the soul, the position of Shiva as a devotee of Krishna, how unmotivated devotion to Krishna promotes a devotee to the highest spiritual position and numerous other points concerning the performance of Vaishnava devotion.

English translations by:

- Bhanu Swami
- Satyanarayana Dasa and Bruce Martin

Hindi translations by:

- Haridas Shastri
- Shyamlal Hakim

=== 6. Priti-sandarbha ===
Priti-sandarbha (Prīti-sandarbha) is a treatise on divine love, the supreme object being Krishna, where love for God (prema) is considered the highest form of liberation. It presents a comparative study of other types of liberation, concluding Prema Bhakti as topmost. It discusses how to attain Prema, how to awaken it, and the symptoms of one who has attained it. It also discusses the distinctions between mundane lust and divine love, the various mellows found among the associates of Krishna, the superexcellence of Madhurya-rasa (divine conjugal love), the overlapping of different rasas, and the glories of Radha.

English translations by:

- Bhanu Swami

Hindi translations by:

- Haridas Shastri
- Shyamlal Hakim
