= Jiva Goswami =

16th-century Indian philosopher

Srila Jiva Goswami
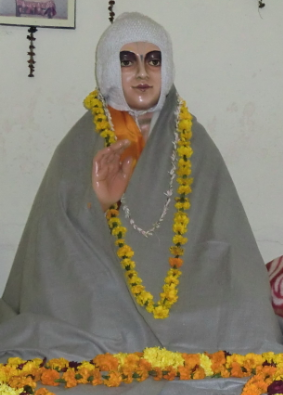
- Murti of Jiva Goswami at his samadhi in Radha Damodar Temple, Vrindavan.

Personal life
- Born: c. 1513 Ramakeli, Malda, Bengal Sultanate, (present-day West Bengal, India)
- Died: c. 1598 (aged 84–85)
- Resting place: Radha-Damodar temple, Vrindavan, India
- Parent: Anupama (father)
- Notable works: Gopala Champu; Sat Sandarbhas
- Known for: Codifying Gaudiya Vaishnavism
- Relatives: Rupa Goswami (paternal uncle), Sanatana Goswami (paternal uncle)
- Honors: Six Goswamis of Vrindavana

Religious life
- Religion: Hinduism
- Denomination: Vaishnavism
- Philosophy: Achintya Bheda Abheda
- Lineage: Brahma-Madhva-Gaudiya
- Sect: Gaudiya Vaishnavism

Religious career
- Teacher: Rupa Goswami
- Based in: Vrindavan, India
- Influenced: Bhaktivinoda Thakur; Gaurakisora Dasa Babaji; Bhaktisiddhanta Sarasvati; A.C. Bhaktivedanta Swami

Jiva Goswami (Sanskrit: जीव गोस्वामी, romanized: Jīva Gosvāmī; c. 1513 – c. 1598) was an Indian philosopher and saint from the Gaudiya Vaishnava school of Vedanta tradition, producing a great number of philosophical works on the theology and practice of Bhakti yoga, Vaishnava Vedanta and associated disciplines. He is known as one of the Six Goswamis of Vrindavan and was the nephew of the two leading figures, Rupa Goswami and Sanatana Goswami.

== Biography ==
=== Genealogy ===
His family lineage can be traced to Indian State of Karnataka and Naihati in the district of North 24 Parganas in present-day West Bengal, India. The former generations according to Bhakti-ratnakara:

Sarvajna Jagatguru was a famous brahmana, great scholar in all Vedas, respected Yajur-vedi of the Baradvaja caste, and king of Karnataka in South India, adored by all other contemporary kings. Sarvajna's son, Aniruddha, was spirited, famous, a proficient scholar of the Vedas, and a favourite of the reigning kings at the time. Aniruddha's sons, Rupesvara (eldest) and Harihara, were well respected due to their virtuous qualities. Rupesvara was famed as a scholar of the scriptures, while Harihara became a master in the art and science of weapons. Both brothers inherited the administration of the state after their father died, but Harihara soon snatched all the power, causing Rupesvara and his wife to travel to Paulastha-desa, where Sikharesvara befriended him and convinced him to settle there.

Rupesvara's son, Padmanabha, was a genius and easily learned the four Vedas making him famous. He had impeccable character and was genuinely absorbed in love of Lord Jagannatha. He left Sikharabhumi and settled on the bank of the Ganges in the village Navahatta (present-day Naihati, West Bengal, India), where he had eighteen daughters and five sons. His five sons were Purusottama (eldest), Jagannatha, Narayana, Murari, and Mukunda (youngest), where Purusottama and Mukunda were the best in experience and character. Mukunda's son, Kumara, was a great brahmana and highly virtuous. He privately engaged in oblations and purificatory penances. Becoming very disturbed by family difficulties, he left the village Navahatta with his followers and settled in the village Bakla Chandradvipa in East Bengal (now Bangladesh). He built a house in the village Fateyabad in Jessore for the convenience of communications with devotees and travelling Vaishnavas.

Among Kumara's many sons, Sanatana (eldest), Rupa (middle), and Vallabha (youngest) were the life of the Vaishnava community and great devotees, all three becoming well known for their academic genius and devotion, and eventually settling in the village Ramakeli in Gauda (present-day Maldah, West Bengal). The brothers were greatly inspired by Chaitanya Mahaprabhu, who lived in Nadia (a district of present-day West Bengal, India) at the time. Sanatana and Rupa eventually resigned from their ministerial (royal) posts and retired to help Chaitanya in his mission, eventually relocating to Vrindavana. Vallabha, who was always happy in service, was initiated by Chaitanya and given the name Anupama, and was known for his stoicism and neutrality in his detachment from worldly affairs.

Alternatively, it is said that his ancestors migrated from Karnataka to Gauda and lived in the village Ramkeli, near Gauda for generations.

Vallabha's son, Jiva Goswami, was very talented, completing his studies in vyakarana and other subjects within a very short time, grasping vast spiritual knowledge with a sincere and devotional endeavour. Jiva avoided activities that had no connection with Krishna. He never married and remained celibate. His pleased uncles treated him affectionately. Jiva, like his uncles, was greatly inspired by Chaitanya Mahaprabhu and was attracted to Vrindavana and his uncles there, which caused Jiva to eventually renounce material life and join his uncles in their mission. On the way to join his uncles in Vrindavana, he first met with Nityananda Prabhu in Nabadwip for a few days, then studied from Madhusudana Vacaspati in Kasi and became expert in Nyaya, Vedanta, and other scriptures.

=== Birth and early life ===
There seems to be some controversy among biographers about Jiva Goswami's birth. Some opine that he lived from 1511 to 1596 CE, while others claim that he lived from 1533 to 1618 CE. Ravi M. Gupta notes that Jiva's father Anupama was present at Prayag in 1516, when Chaitanya instructed Rupa, and died unexpectedly after returning to Bengal. So,1517 is the latest possible year of Jiva's birth. Both Gupta and Stuart Elkman refute the 1533 dating while the later argues for 1514 as the cutoff date.

Not much is known about Jiva Goswami's childhood. He was born in Ramakeli in the district of Maldah, West Bengal as the son of Srivallabha Mallika (also known as Anupama), the younger brother of Rupa and Sanatana; his mother's name is unknown. He had a strong affinity to the worship of Krishna even from his childhood and excelled in his education completing his studies in Sanskrit Vyakarana (grammar) and Kavya (poetics) within a very short period.

When Jiva was three or four years old, his uncles resigned from their ministerial posts at the court of Alauddin Hussein Shah (ruled 1493–1519 CE) after their initial meeting with Chaitanya Mahaprabhu (1486–1534 CE) and they decided to join his ranks as mendicants. Jiva's father, Anupama, also met with Chaitanya at this time and followed in the footsteps of his elder brothers and proceeded to travel with Rupa to Vrindavana.

=== Jiva leaves home ===
Hearing that his father and uncles had made their decision to work in the service of Chaitanya Mahaprabhu, the young Jiva desired to join them also. According to the biographical work Bhakti Ratnakara of Narahari Chakravarti, Jiva had a dream of Chaitanya at this time. This gave him the impetus to leave home and join Rupa and Sanatana. It is unclear from his biographies whether or not Jiva actually ever met Chaitanya personally.

Jiva travelled to Navadvipa in West Bengal and met with Nityananda Rama, one of the foremost associate of Chaitanya mahaprabhu. Nityananda took Jiva to all the holy places in Navadvipa and they circumambulated the entire area together. This marked the beginning of the Gaudiya tradition of Navadvipa parikrama (circumambulation of the nine sections of Navadvipa). After the pilgrimage, Nityananda gave his blessings for the young Jiva to proceed towards Vrindavana.

=== Vrindavana ===
Jiva went on to Benares where he studied for some time under the tutelage of Madhusudana Vachaspati, the disciple of the famous logician and Vedantist, Sarvabhauma Bhattacharya. Under Vachaspati, Jiva mastered the six systems of Indian philosophy known as Sad Darsana.

In 1535 Jiva arrived in Vrindavana where he remained under the tutelage of his uncles, Rupa and Sanatana (by this time his father Anupama had died). He accepted initiation from Rupa Goswami and was taught the esoteric principles of devotion to Krishna. Jiva helped to edit the writings of Rupa and Sanatana and assisted them in their work in propagating Gaudiya Vaishnavism and excavating the lost holy places of Vrindavana.

=== Literary contributions ===
After the passing of Rupa and Sanatana, Jiva Goswami became the foremost authority in the Gaudiya Vaishnava line. In 1542 Jiva established one of the prominent and important temples in the Vrindavana area, the Radha Damodara mandir, installing deities of Radha and Krishna that had been personally carved by Rupa Goswami. At that time he also established the Vishva Vaishnava Raja Sabha (World Vaishnava Association) and the Rupanuga Vidyapitha, an educational facility for Gaudiya Vaishnavas to study the works of Rupa and Sanatana. His erudition and spirituality were so famous that the Moghul emperor Akbar became his ardent admirer and donated paper for his writing.

Jiva's name is recorded in several legal documents concerning land for the Gosvami's temples; the most significant is an edict of 1568 in which the Mughal emperor Akbar gave official recognition to the custodians of the Madana-mohana and Govindadeva temples, issued at the request of Todar Mal, who in turn had acted on behalf of Jiva. According to Ravi M. Gupta, Rūpa Gosvāmī had apparently already died by this time, leaving legal responsibility for the temples with Jiva.

In 1558, Jiva instructed his students, Narottama Dasa, Srinivasa Acarya and Shyamananda, to go to Bengal and propagate the Gaudiya Vaishnava philosophy and to take with them the original manuscripts that had been written by Rupa and Sanatana.

One of Jiva's main theological contributions was to present Chaitanya's teachings as “the epitome of the Vedas.” To do so, Jiva would claim that the Bhagavata Purana, which Chaitanya regarded as the key Hindu scripture, was indeed part of the Vedas, while it was not generally considered as “part of the canonical Veda” at that time. Jiva proceeded to “extend the scope of the Veda to include the epics and the Purānas,” and concluded that the Bhagavata Purana was “scripture par excellence”. In fact, he shifted “the locus of scriptural authority from the Veda to the Bhāgavata,” which had important, if controversial, consequences for the subsequent development of Hindu theology. He argued that the Bhagavata Purana was the most authoritative Hindu text.

=== Death ===
Jiva Goswami died in 1596 CE (or 1618 according to some biographies). His samādhi (tomb) is located in the precincts of the Radha-Damodara temple in Vrindavana.

According to followers of Gaudiya Vaishnavism, Jiva Goswami is considered to be the incarnation of Vilasa Manjari, an eternal maidservant of Radha.

== Achintya-bhedabheda philosophy ==
It was in his Sarva-samvadini commentary to the Sat Sandarbhas of Hindu philosophy that Jiva Goswami first wrote of Achintya Bheda Abheda, the philosophy of Chaitanya Mahaprabhu. In essence, the philosophy of Achintya bheda abheda, or "inconceivable oneness and difference", avoids the extremes of Shankara's monistic Advaita vedanta and Madhva's pure dualism (Dvaita) by interpreting the material and spiritual potencies of the Supreme Person (Bhagavan) as being simultaneously one and different with Him. Recent work in comparative philosophy "we should add the word mystery (which is from the Latin mysterium and the Greek mustērion) to the many ways acintya might be translated within the context of Jīva’s thought."

== Works ==
There are at least 25 literary works attributed to Jiva Goswami, which can be classified into four types: treatises, commentaries, grammar and rhetoric, and poetry, with the best-known in each category being Sat-sandarbhas, Durgama-sangamani, Hari-namamrita-vyakarana and Gopalachampu, respectively.

Western philosophers are now studying the sandarbhas and are marveling at the depth of the wisdom contained therein. It is sometimes said that the six sandarbhas represent the perfection of sambandha-gyan, abhideya-gyan, and prayojana-gyan. Of these six, the first four sandarbhas are devoted to sambandha; the fifth is devoted to abhideya; and the sixth to prayojana. Consequently, the Sat-sandarbha is considered the most important philosophical treatise in the history of Chaitanyite Vaishnavism.

=== Treatises ===
Sat-sandarbhas (Six Sandarbhas),
Bhagavata-sandarbha (Bhāgavata-sandarbha):
Sometimes called the Bhagavata-sandarbha, not to be confused with the second treatise titled Bhagavat-sandarbha, where "sandarbha" literally means "weaving" or "arranging". Sandarbhas are a thematic arrangement of the Bhagavata Purana presenting Caitanya Vaishnavism in a systematic and comprehensive way. Intensely theological, this work is considered the most important among all his works. According to Jiva Goswami, Gopala Bhatta Goswami completed the preliminary work, but couldn't finish it. Jiva Goswami expanded it into six books, wherein he systematically presents the philosophy of Chaitanya Mahaprabhu with scriptural evidences.

1. Tattva-Sandarbha:
  A treatise on the various types of evidences (pramanas) used in Vedic philosophy, concluding that shabda (divine sound in the form of the Vedic scriptures) is the highest, and of all the scriptures, the Bhagavata Purana is the highest pointing to the Absolute Truth.
2. Bhagavat-sandarbha:
  Distinguishes the impersonal aspect of Godhead (Brahman), the localised form of God within the heart of each living being (Paramatma), and the highest personal aspect of Godhead (Krishna or Bhagavan). Describes the spiritual realm of Krishna, the modes of material nature, the mode of pure goodness (visuddha-sattva), the importance of worshiping the deity of Krishna, and the eternal nature and qualities of the deity.
3. Paramatma-sandarbha (Paramātma-sandarbha):
  Describes the characteristics of Paramatma (supersoul), and how he resides in all living entities in the universe. Discusses the nature of the materially conditioned living entities, the phenomenal material world, the illusory potency (maya), the theory of transformation, the various avatars of Krishna, how Krishna reciprocates with his devotees, and how Krishna is characterised by six particular opulences.
4. Krishna-sandarbha (Kṛṣṇa-sandarbha):
  Gives a number of quotes from various scriptures to prove that Krishna is the supreme god. Discusses the pastimes and qualities of Krishna as well as his avatars and functionary expansions. There is a description of Goloka, the planet of Krishna in relation to Vrindavana in the material sphere, the eternal associates of Krishna and their expansions, and a description of the Gopis and the topmost position of Radha among them.
5. Bhakti-sandarbha:
  Explains how devotion to Krishna is directly executed, how the self is manifest through bhakti, the potency of imperfectly executed bhakti, the differences between a great and ordinary devotee, spontaneous love of god (raganuga-bhakti), the specific purpose of becoming a devotee of Krishna, and other perfectional stages. Discusses varnashrama dharma (the socio-religious system established in scriptures), the superexcellent position of devotion to Krishna as compared to other conceptions such as yoga, and the worship of minor deities of the Hindu pantheon as being futile in comparison to the worship of Krishna's devotees. Explains liberation of the soul, the position of Shiva as a devotee of Krishna, how unmotivated devotion to Krishna promotes a devotee to the highest spiritual position and numerous other points concerning the performance of Vaishnava devotion.
6. Priti-sandarbha (Prīti-sandarbha):
  A treatise on divine love, the supreme object being Krishna, where love for God (prema) is considered the highest form of liberation. Presents a comparative study of other types of liberation, concluding prema bhakti as topmost. Discusses how to attain prema, how to awaken it, and the symptoms of one who has attained it. Discusses the distinctions between mundane lust and divine love, the various mellows found among the associates of Krishna, the superexcellence of madhurya-rasa (divine conjugal love), the overlapping of different rasas, and the glories of Radha.

Radha-Krishna-archana-dipika (Rādhā-Kṛṣṇa-arcana-dīpikā),
Radha-krishnarchana-dipika (Rādhā-Kṛṣṇārcana-dīpikā),
Radha-krishnarchana-chandrika (Rādhā-Kṛṣṇārcana-candrikā):
Intensely theological work describing the process of worshiping Radha and Krishna together in deity form, a significant contribution to the Chaitanyite sampradaya.

=== Commentaries ===
Krama-sandarbha,
Srimad-bhagavata-tika (Śrīmad-bhāgavata-ṭīkā):
A commentary on the Bhagavata Purana, often described as the "seventh" of the six Sandarbhas.

Dig-darshani-tika (Dig-darṣani-ṭīkā),
Brahmha-samhita-tika (Brahmhā-saṁhitā-ṭīkā):
A commentary on the Brahma Samhita (Brahmā-saṁhitā).

Durgama-sangamani (Durgama-saṅgamanī),
Bhakti-rasamrita-sesha (Bhakti-rasāmṛta-śeṣa),
Bhakti-rasamrita-sindu-tika (Bhakti-rasāmṛta-sindu-ṭīkā):
A commentary on Rupa Goswami's Bhakti-rasamrita-sindhu.

Lochana-rochani (Locana-rocani),
Ujjvala-nilamani-tika (Ujjvala-nīlamaṇi-ṭīkā):
A commentary on Rupa Goswami's Ujjvala-nilamani.

Sukha-bodhini,
Gopala-tapani-tika (Gopāla-tāpanī-ṭīkā):
A commentary on the Gopala-tapani Upanishad (Gopala-tapani Upaniṣad), which has importance in Gaudiya Vaishnavism as it provides Upanishadic backing for the notion that Krishna is the supreme deity.

Gayatri-vyakhya-vivriti (Gāyatrī-vyākhyā-vivṛti),
Agni-puranastha Gayatri-bhashya (Gāyatrī-bhāṣya):
A commentary on the Brahma Gayatri mantra as found in the Agni Purana, chapters 216–217.

Laghu-vaishnava-toshani (Laghu-vaiṣṇava-toṣaṇī),
Laghu-toshani (Laghu-toṣaṇī):
A commentary on the 10th canto of the Bhagavata Purana based on Sanatana Goswami's Brihad-vaishnava-toshani (Brhad-vaiṣṇava-toṣaṇī) commentary.

Sarva-samvadini (Sarva-saṁvādinī):
An extensive auto-commentary on Jiva Goswami's own Sat-sandarbhas.

Padma-puranastha Yogasara-stotra-tika (Yogasāra-stotra-ṭīkā),
Yogasara-stavaka-tika (Yogasāra-stavaka-ṭīkā)

Padma-puranokta Krishna-pada-padma-chihna (Kṛṣṇa-pada-padma-cīhna):
An elaborate description of the insignia found on Krishna's feet according to Padma Purana.

Radhika-kara-pada-sthita-chihna (Rādhikā-kara-pada-sthita-cīhna):
A description of the insignia found on Radhna's hands and feet.

=== Grammar and rhetoric ===
Hari-namamrita-vyakarana (Hari-nāmāmṛta-vyākaraṇa),
Harinamamrita-vyakarana (Harināmāmṛta-vyākaraṇa):
A work on Sanskrit grammar, wherein each and every word, syllable and grammatical rule is explained in relation to Krishna and his pastimes.

Sutra-malika (Sūtra-mālikā):
A grammatical work on derivations of Sanskrit words.

Dhatu-sangraha (Dhātu-saṅgraha):
A work on the verb roots of Sanskrit words.

Rasamrita-sesha (Rasāmṛta-śeṣa):
A work dealing with Sanskrit composition based on Viswanatha Kaviraja's Sahityadarpana, with many added examples from Jiva Goswami and the other Goswamis.

=== Poetry ===
Madhava-mahotsava (Mādhava-mahotsava):
Descriptions of Radha's coronation ceremony as Queen of Vrindavana.

Gopala-virudavali (Gopāla-virudāvalī):
A short poem extolling the glories of Gopala (Krishna) in 38 verses.

Gopala-champu (Gopāla-campū),
Gopalachampu (Gopālacampū):
Intensely theological poetic work divided into two parts. Purva-champu (Pūrva-campū) has 33 chapters and elaborately describes Krishna's activities in Vrindavana. Uttara-champu (Uttara-campū) has 37 chapters and describes Krishna's activities in Mathura and Dvarka after leaving Vrindavana and the separation the residents of Vrindavana feel in his absence.

Sankalpa-kalpavriksha (Saṅkalpa-kalpavṛkṣa),
Sankalpa-kalpadruma (Saṅkalpa-kalpadruma):
Explains the eight-fold daily pastimes of Radha and Krishna (asta-kaliya-lila) in prayer form.

Bhavartha-suchaka-champu (Bhāvārtha-sūcaka-campū)

== See also ==
- Hare Krishna mantra
- Nityananda
- Gaudiya Math
- International Society for Krishna Consciousness
- Svayam bhagavan
