= Narottama Dasa =

Leading acarya in the Gaudiya Vaishnavism

Narottama Dasa Thakura (13 February 1520; date of death unknown), also known as Thakura Mahasaya, was a Gaudiya Vaishnava saint who spread Vaishnava bhakti throughout Odisha, in Bengal, and elsewhere in India. Narottama Dasa was the son of King Krishnananda Datta and Narayani Devi, who resided in Gopalpur Pargana of the modern-day Rajshahi district of Bangladesh. According to some scriptures, after the death of his father he entrusted his royal duties to the eldest son of his paternal uncle and left for Vrindavana.

== Biography ==
Narottama Dasa Thakura was a lifelong brahmachari. He was born in a family of the Bengali Kulin Kayastha caste, the son of King Shri Krishnananda Datta, who ruled the area of Gopalpura in Rajashahi district of modern-day Bangladesh, his capital being Khetri on the Padma River. Narottama's mother was Narayani Devi, and he was born on the purnima (full-moon day) in the month of Magha (January/February) 1520, which corresponds to 13 February 1520.

From Narottama's early childhood he was always attracted to Sri Chaitanya. When Narottama was born the astrologers came, cast a chart, and said that this boy would become either a great king or a mendicant preacher. He was also trained in Sanskrit, which he mastered in a short time. He was renowned for his skill in Sanskrit grammar, poetry, prosody, etc.

At the age of twelve Narottama dasa Thakura had a vision of Lord Nityananda in a dream. Nityananda told Narottama to bathe in the Padma River, whereupon he would receive love of Godhead. Following the instructions of Lord Nityananda, Narottama bathed in the Padma, and the Goddess of the river appeared and on the order of Lord Chaitanya gave him pure love of Godhead. As the golden boy walked by, all the onlookers wondered who this enchanting young boy was, and when he reached his home, his own mother could not recognise him and wondered about the identity of the extraordinary boy. He then explained to his mother that he was her very own son and related to her the incident that had changed his complexion from dark to golden.

One morning when the young prince Narottam, born in a royal family in West Bengal, went to the river Padma for his daily bath, the river imparted unto him the transcendental love of Godhead that Sri Chaitanya Mahaprabhu had left for him with the river Padma. Thereafter, experiencing great love for Shyamsundar, he left home at the age of sixteen and started his journey towards Jagannath Puri to take darshan of Mahaprabhu along with Sri Shyamananda Prabhu and Srinivas Acharya. However, on the way they received news of the disappearance of Mahaprabhu and his associates and feeling great distress, changed their route and started towards Vrindavan, hoping to meet Sri Rupa and Sanatan Goswami. However, they also brought their pastimes in this world to an end and this plunged the three devotees in great grief. When they finally reached Vrindavan, they took shelter of the lotus feet of Sri Jiva Goswami and received instructions on all transcendental subject matters from him. However, since Srila Jiva goswami was not initiating anyone, he instructed Narottam to take shelter of Srila Lokanath Prabhu.

Following the instructions of his shiksha guru, Narottam das thakur went to Sri Lokanath Prabhu and begged for initiation, but he also refused saying that he did not want to have any disciples. Thereafter, resolving to please Lokanath Prabhu, Narottam would every morning go and clean the area where Lokanath Prabhu would go to pass stool. This soon came to the attention of Lokanath Prabhu and he decided to check who is doing it. When he discovered that it was Narottam, being pleased with his humble service, he gave him initiation, and Srila Narottam das Thakur started performing his bhajan under the guidance of his Diksha guru Sri Lokanath Prabhu and his Siksha guru Srila Jiva goswami.

After some time, under the instructions of Srila Jiva Goswami, Srila Narottam das Thakur went to West Bengal along with Srinivas Acharya and Shyamananda Prabhu, and preached the teachings of Shri Chaitanya Mahaprabhu and the Goswamis of Vrindavan. Thereafter, in Kheturi dham he performed the very first Gaura Purnima festival, in which Jahnava Ma, the eternal consort of Nityananda Prabhu, was personally present and she cooked a great feast for all the assembled Vaishnavas. During this festival, after the installation of the Deities, during the uproarious kirtan, all the devotees had the divine darshan of Panca Tattva dancing in the kirtan.

Though still a young man, Narottama das would only maintain himself by observance of the vow of madhukari, which means that he would only eat what he could beg by going from door to door of the householder devotees, just as a bumble bee goes from flower to flower to take pollen. By this strict vow Narottama kept no kitchen or store of foodstuffs. He simply relied only upon the mercy of the Lord.

Narottama dasa Thakura would preach relentlessly, removing the misconceptions of the age, and would invoke his disciples to follow suit. This was one of Narottama dasa Thakura's main preaching points – that a Vaishnava is not a mleccha, nor yavana, nor Brahmin, nor sudra, etc. Vaisnavism should only be gauged according to one's surrender and realization in Krishna consciousness. There should be no consideration of birth, age, caste, creed, shoe size, education, social status, who one is initiated by, the year one took initiation, or when one first came in contact with devotional service. Nor is Krishna consciousness advancement dependent on household duties, taking sannyasa, ritualistic performances, group agreement, or the like – simply how one is absorbed in one's service to the lotus-eyed Lord. This is the conclusion of Narottama dasa Thakura's preaching strategy. Srila Narottam das Thakur, preached far and wide and made many disciples, many of whom were even caste Brahmanas, which made other Brahmanas, who were not above the bodily designations, offensive towards him, saying that he would go to hell because he was initiating brahmanas when he himself was Kayasta. This displeased Srila Narottam das Thakur and therefore with his sweet will he left this material world. However, not understanding his exalted position, the brahmanas started saying that this was happening due to his offense of initiating brahmanas. Seeing this, the dear disciples of Narottam das Thakur requested him to please come back to life to prove these offensive people false, and just for the pleasure of his devotees, he again became conscious and thus proved them wrong. Realising their mistake, they all fell at his lotus feet and begged for forgiveness. After this incident, Narottam das Thakur blessed the entire population by staying on the planet for another year after which he gave up his life by dissolving in the river Padma.

Narottama had many thousands of disciples, mostly in the areas of modern day Bangladesh. He departed under the tamarind tree at Prema Ghat by the side of the Ganges (Padma River) at Kheturi, where Lord Chaitanya had sat, and where the goddess of the river presented to Narottama pure love of Godhead, after composing the beautiful song, "Saparsada bhagavad viraha janita vilapa," which begins "je anilo prema dhana koruna pracur heno prabhu kotha gela acarya thakura.

His life is described in Prema-vilasa. In Vrindavan, Narottama was received by Rupa Gosvami and Sanatana Gosvami. After Narottama was initiated by Lokanatha Gosvami who in turn instructed him to go and study from Jiva Goswami. He traveled to Bengal with other sadhus (holy men), like Srinivasa Acarya, to distribute devotional writings to the general public.

Fifty years after the disappearance of Chaitanya Mahaprabhu, Narottama organized annual festivals in Bengal, which served to keep the Gaudiya philosophy unified. The significant meeting took place in Kheturi where the Gaudiya Vaishnava Theology of Chaitanya Mahaprabhu's sect was defined. The exact year of this event is unknown but some say that it was around 1572.

it is believed that after the disappearance of Narottama Dasa Thakura. The 18th century Meitei vaishnav king Bhagyachandra was the incarnate of Narottama Dasa Thakur. as per his qualities of patronizing the ideas of Gaudiya Vaishnavism in the northeast kingdom and introducing the classical Dance form of Rasalila in his kingdom, translating Vaishnav texts like The Bhagavad Gita and Vishnu Purana to Meitei. his other quality which was parallel to Narottam included his divine visions of meeting Lord Krishna which helped both himself and his entire kingdom of Manipur. He himself was a ardent Follower of Narottama's ideas along with Chaitanya's.

== Narottama's writings ==
Narottama Dasa is best known for his devotional poetry wherein he describes emotionally intense feelings towards Radha and Krishna. His prayers Sri Rupa Manjari Pada and Sri Guru Carana Padma are still sung within both Gaudiya Math and ISKCON temples on a regular basis.

Among the writings of Narottama, Prarthana and Prema bhakti candrika (The Moonrays of Loving Devotion) are the most well-known.

Hari Haraye Namah Krsna (Nama Sankirtana)
A Bengali bhajan composed by Narottama Dasa. Music and singing by A.C. Bhaktivedanta Swami (ca.1970). (19:29)

The brief write-up titled Hatapaltana is also attributed to Narottama but the contents do not seem to be in harmony with historical events and thus some believe that it is a fake work. Narottama did translate Smaranamangala into Bengali verse. In eleven slokas this work describes the pastimes of Radha and Krishna in eight parts of the day.

A. C. Bhaktivedanta Swami Prabhupada, a spiritual descendant of Narottama through Bhaktisiddhanta Sarasvati Thakura, had often cited his prayers as many of Gaudiya Vaishnava acharyas did: "The prayers of Narottama dasa Thakura," he said. "This sound is above the material platform. It is directly from the spiritual platform. And there is no need of understanding the language. It is just like a thunderburst. Everyone can hear the sound of thunder-there is no misunderstanding. Similarly, these songs are above the material platform, and they crack like thunder within your heart."

== See also ==
- Kirtan
