= Ramkeli Mela =

Pilgrimage in Hinduism

Ramkeli Mela রামকেলি মেলা
- Status: active
- Genre: Fair, Religious gathering
- Frequency: Every year
- Locations: Ramkeli, Malda district, West Bengal
- Coordinates: 24.8894498°N 88.1287061°E
- Country: India
- Previous event: 2022
- Next event: 2025

Ramkeli Mela (Bengali: রামকেলি মেলা) is a pilgrimage and fair of Hinduism. On the occasion of this fair, devout Hindus come to Ramkeli. Generally the Ramkeli fair is organized every year at Ramkeli. Ramkeli is known as the Gupto Vrindavan (Secret Vrindavan), an important pilgrimage site for the Vaishnavism.

The fair starts every year on Joishtho Sankranti of Bengali calendar, and lasts for 7 days. It is the largest fair and religious gathering in Malda district and one of the largest in West Bengal.

== History ==
Rupa Goswami and Sanatana Goswami, known as Mahavaishnavas, were included in the cabinet of Gauda ruler Husain Shah. They established the Madanmohan Temple at Ramkeli in 1509. During his journey to Vrindavan, Chaitanya Mahaprabhu met two Mahavaishnavas Rupa Goswami and Sanatan Goswami. On 15 June 1515, he met on Jaishtha Sankranti under the Kelikdamba (Mitragyna parvifolia) and Tamal (Diospyros montana) trees adjacent to the Madanamohan temple at Ramkeli village. Festivals or fairs have been held at Ramkeli for more than 500 years to celebrate this meeting of Mahaprabhu and Rupa-Sanatan.

== Dates and Location ==
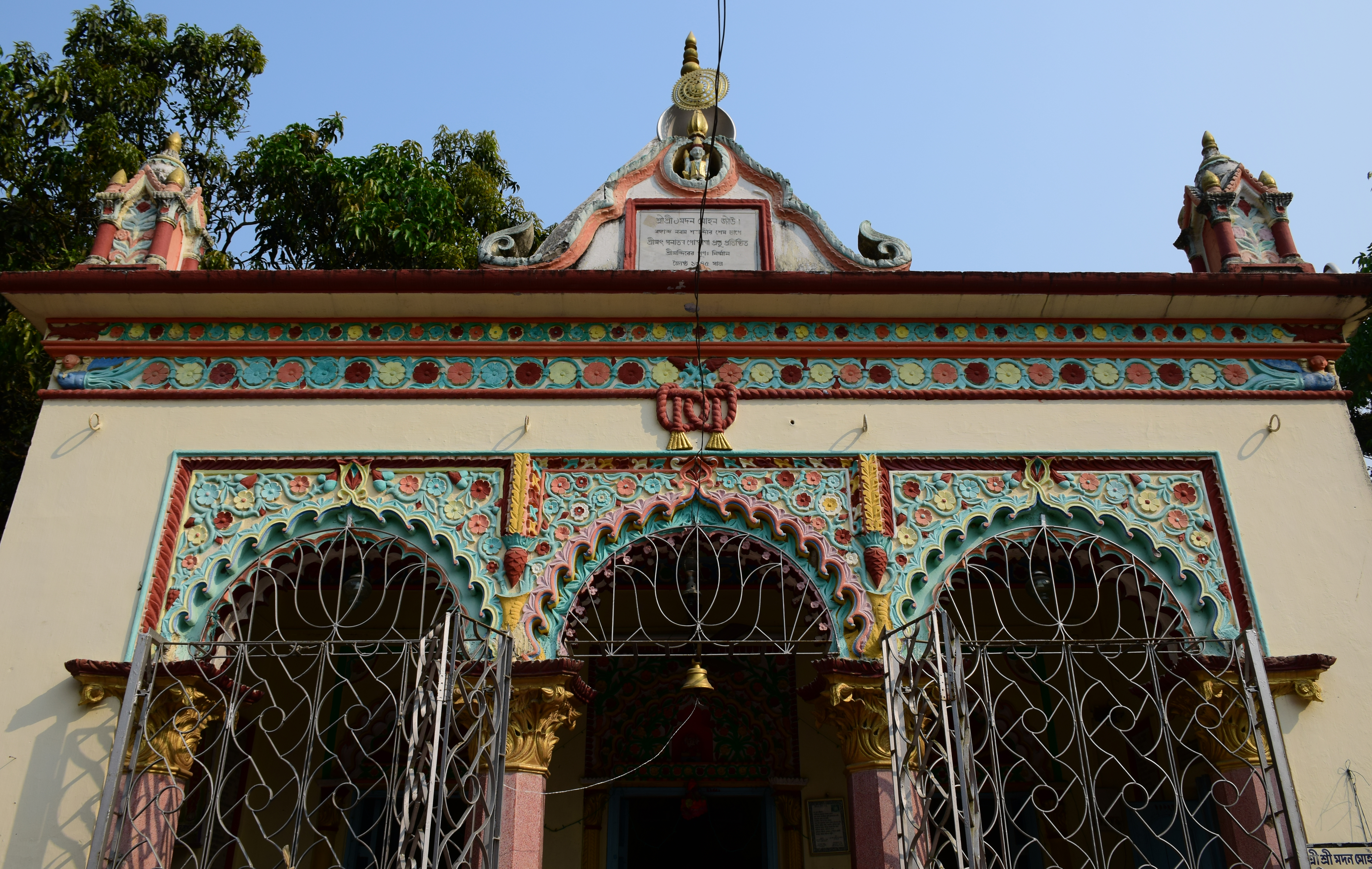
Madanmohan Jiu temple, where Chaitanya Mahaprabhu met Rupa Goswami and Sanatana Goswami. The fair is organized around this temple.

=== Dates ===
The fair is usually held on June 15 to mark the arrival of Chaitanya Mahaprabhu on Joishtho Sankranti at Ramkeli. According to tradition, the Mahat Utsaba (grand festival) lasts for three days, and the fair lasts for 7 days.

=== Location ===
The Ramkeli Mela is held at Ramkeli village, which belongs to the area of the medieval Bengal capital city of Gauḍa and is close to the India–Bangladesh international border. The site belongs to Malda district of West Bengal. The fair is organized around the Madanmohan temple.

== Rituals ==
=== Kirtan ===
The kirtan festival starts from the first day of the fair, and continues till the third day. This festival is attended by devout Hindus of the Vaishnavism. Vaishnavas and Vaishnavees attend the kirtan festival. A large number of Akhara are also constructed for the Vaishnavas and Vaishnavees throughout Ramkeli village.

=== Maternal Pinda ===
Generally in Hinduism the pindas is offered to paternal lineages. But, in the Ramkeli Mela there is a tradition of Maternal Pinda, and offer pindas to maternal lineages by women. Women devotees from Bihar, Jharkhand and Odisha attend the fair, and they offer pindas to maternal lineages. Pindas are offered to maternal lineages runs from 5 am to 12 pm.
