= Ramkeli Madanmohan Jiu Mandir =

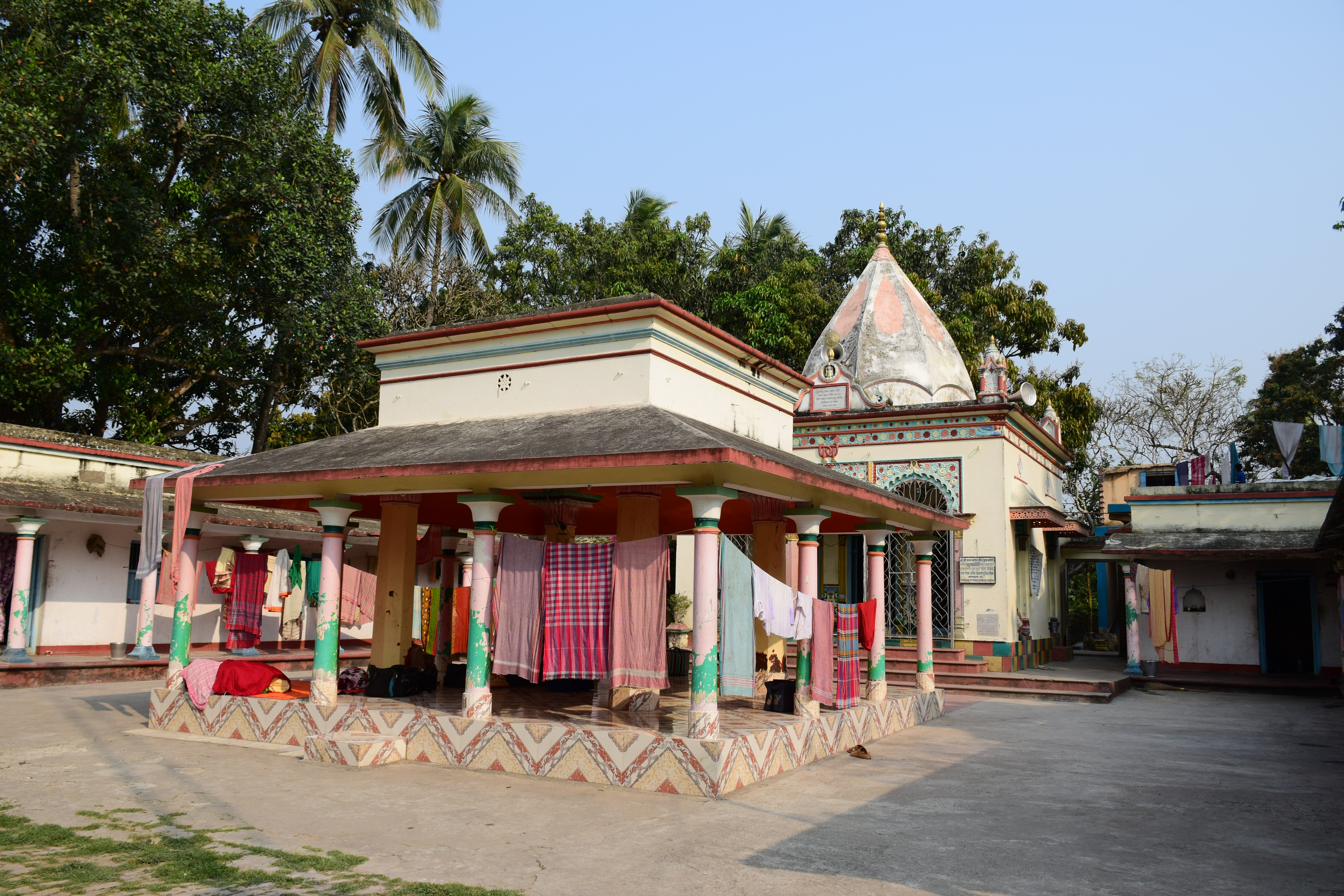
- Ramkeli Madanmohan Jiu Mandir complex

Religion
- Affiliation: Hinduism
- District: Malda
- Deity: Madanamohan
- Festival: Ramkeli Mahotsav and Fair

Location
- Location: Ramkeli
- State: West Bengal
- Country: India
- Interactive map of Ramkeli Madanmohan Jiu Mandir
- Coordinates: 24.8894498°N 88.1287061°E

Architecture
- Type: Bengal temple architecture
- Style: Combination of Dalan and Ratna Style
- Funded by: Rupa Goswami and Sanatana Goswami
- Established: 1509
- Completed: 1345 Baṅgābda (Present temple structure)

Ramkeli Madanmohan Jiu Mandir is a Vaishnava temple at Ramkeli village in West Bengal. Hindu god Krishna is worshiped in the form of Madanamohan in this temple. It is located in the ruined medieval city of Gauda in Malda district. Built by Rupa Goswami and Sanatana Goswami, known as Mahavaishnavas, the temple stands in the northern part of the village. The present temple building is a great example of the combination of Dalan and Ratna architecture of the district; however, the temple was established in the first decade of the 16th century.

The temple is the product of the spread of the Gaudiya Vaishnavism throughout Bengal. This temple is administered by the Madana Mohan Jiu Trust Committee.

== History ==
The temple was established in 1509 by Mahavaishnava Rupa Goswami and Sanatana Goswami at Ramkeli. On 15 June 1515, Chaitanya Mahaprabhu met Rupa Goswami and Sanatana Goswami during the journey to Vrindavan on Joishtho Sankranti.

The temple was rebuilt in 1938 (1345 Bangabda), during which the present temple building was constructed.

West Bengal's Department of Tourism took up the Ramkeli Madanmohan Jiu Mandir renovation plan in 2016, including the Mahaprabhu Chaitanya Charan temple, guest accommodation and the main entrance of the temple. About 6 crore rupees were allotted for the renovation.

== Architecture ==
The temple premises are surrounded by a wall. There is an entrance at the south-east corner of the wall. On the eastern and western sides of the temple premises are long buildings with several rooms including Veranda, which are used for temple purposes. There are seven ponds around the temple premises.

=== Temple building ===
The two most architectural styles of Bengal temple architecture are the Dalan and Ratna is observed in Ramkeli Madanmohan Jiu Mandir. The part of the temple building from the base to the roof is constructed in Dalan style and above the roof in Ratna style. The temple building is surrounded by a rectangular altar, slightly higher than the temple courtyard, but lower than the building floor. There is one step of stair between the temple courtyard and the altar, and two steps of stair between the altar and the building floor.

There are five ratna in total, four at the four corners of the roof and one in the middle. Ratna located at the four corners are smaller compared to the middle size of ratna. Three Kolshi's are placed on top of the middle ratna.

The interior of the temple building is divided into two parts, which are the worship room and the Veranda. There is a wall between the worship room and the Veranda. A door in the wall connects the worship room and the Veranda.

=== Nata-mandir ===
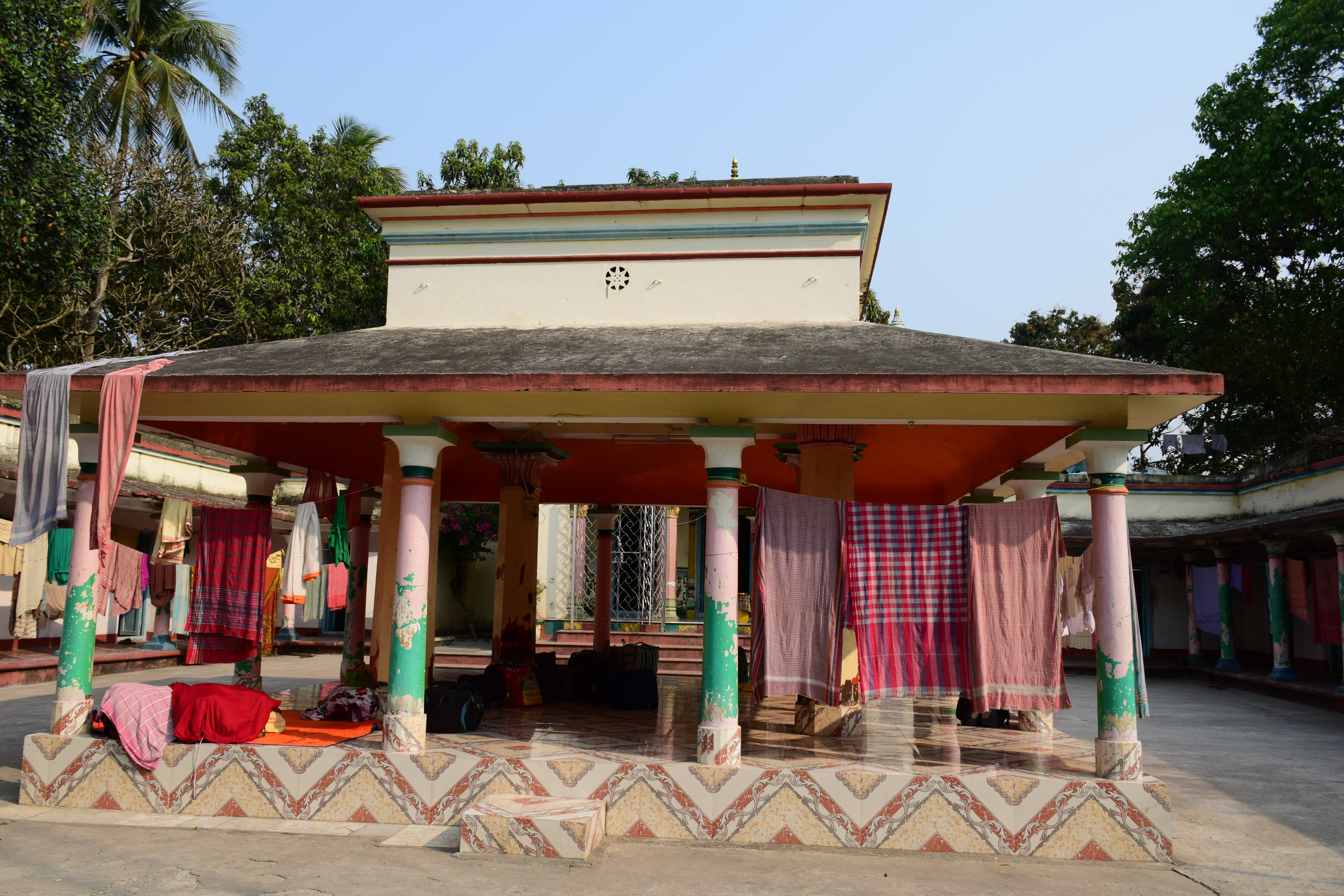
Nata-mandir in the middle of courtyard; the main roof, sloping roof and pillars are visible in the picture.

In the front of the temple building, there is a nata-mandir in the middle of the temple premises, which is used for Sankirtan and rest of the visitors. The nata-mandir is open all around and there are no walls around it. There are twelve pillars around the nata-mandir and four pillars in the middle part. The four central pillars support the main roof of the nata-mandir. Four sloping chalas start from the four sides of the nata-mandir and meet at the four walls above the four pillars in the middle part. Above these walls lies the original roof. The central pillars of the nata-mandir are larger in diameter than the surrounding pillars.

=== Entrance ===
The arched entrance is located in the south-east of the premises. The arch is supported by two pillars. At the top of the pillar is placed the kolash. The arch is connected to the pillar at the base of the kolash (urn). The two pillars have a niche each, but there are no statues or pictures in it.

== Artwork ==
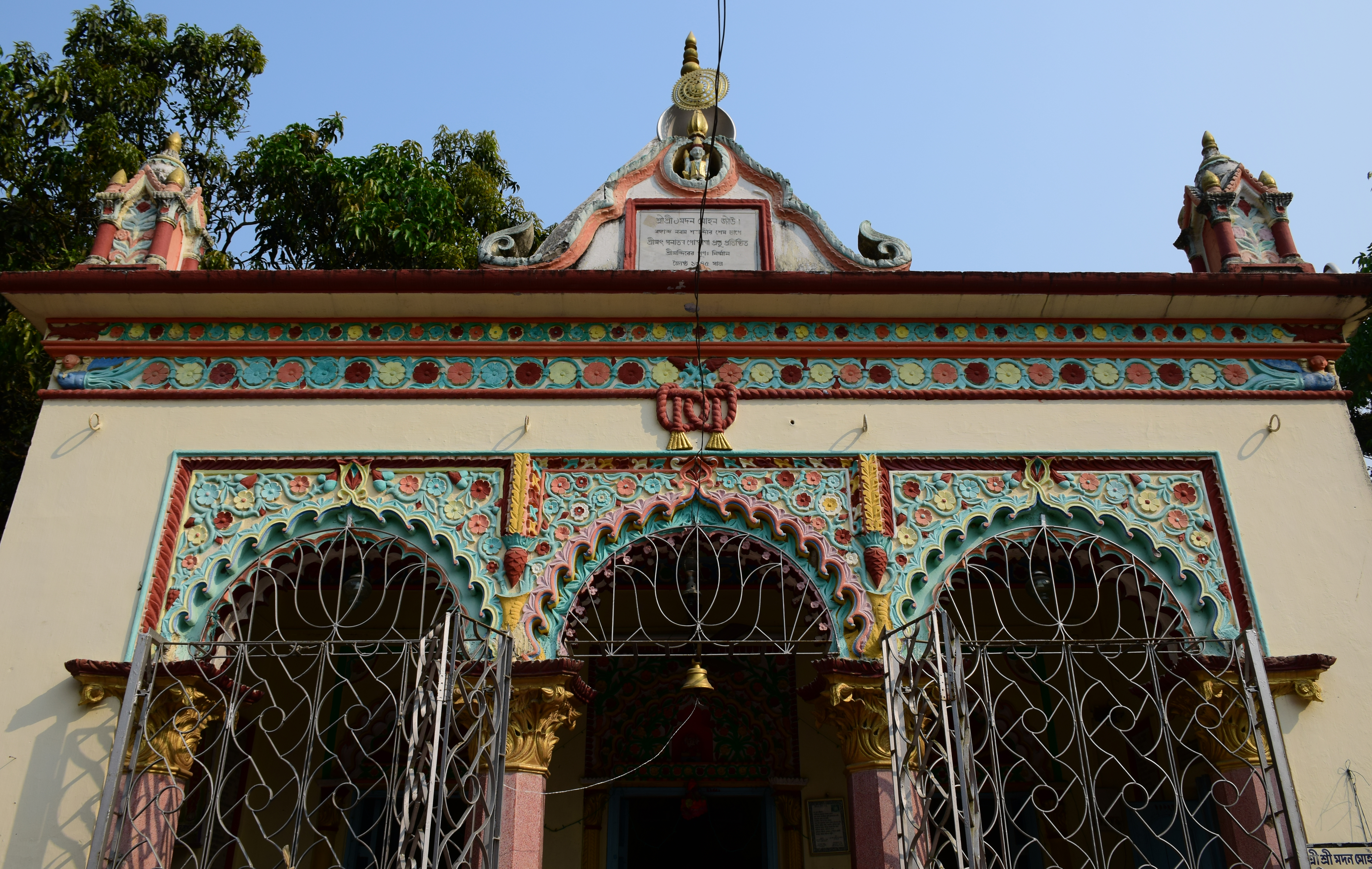
The facade of temple with three arches and flower-leaf designs

Terracotta art work is observed on the facade of the main temple. The facade of the temple has three arches, which are supported by four pillars. A little deeper than the main wall above the three arches are flower-leaf designs, which are made by the terracotta art. The roof's eaves of the temple are extend outwards from the surrounding walls. At the junction of the facade and the roof of temple there are two continuous series of flower-leaf designs on the front wall. The lower series of flower-leaf designs is larger than the upper series. A shape of rope is created on the wall below the flower-leaf arrangement. The arrangement of flower-leaf designs and the shape of rope are all created by terracotta art. Seeing the terracotta rope, it seems as if the walls around the temple are tied with the rope. Above the middle arch the two ends of the rope form a knot.

== Bibliography ==
- Sarkar, Dr. AkhiI (2021). Sarkar, Anil Kumar (ed.). "Journal of People's History and Culture, Volume – 7 Number – 2". Journal of People's History and Culture. 7. Garia Society for Studies of Marginal People.
