= Hari-namamrta-vyakarana =

The Hari-namamrta-vyakarana is a Sanskrit grammar composed by Jiva Goswami, in which all the technical terms in the sutras are names of Krishna or his associates.

Sri Jiva's inspiration for composing this book originated in Sri Chaitanya Mahaprabhu's explanation of grammar in terms of Krishna's holy names, when he was a pandit in Nabadwip. This grammar was composed in two parts:Laghu-hari-namamrta-vyakarnana and Brhad-hari-namamrta-vyakarnana. A shorter version of the texts, known as Samksepa-Hari-namamrta-Vyakarana, ascribed to either Sri Jiva or Sri Sanatana Goswami is also extant.

== Chapters ==
The Hari-namamrta-vyakarana consists of seven chapters, or prakaranas.The prakaranas of the book are given below.

- Samjna-Sandhi Prakarana
- Vishnupada Prakarana: this chapter deals with declension of nouns
- Akhyata Prakarana: This chapter deals with conjugation of Sanskrit verbal roots, commonly known as dhatus
- Karaka Prakarana: This chapter deals with cases (nominative, etc.)
- Kridanta Prakarana: This chapter deals with suffixes of Sanskrit nouns, which can change the meaning of the word
- Samasa Prakarana: This chapter deals with the various types of samasas, or compound words found in Sanskrit
- Taddhita Prakarana

== Mangalacharan ==
* श्रीश्रीराधाकृष्णाभ्यां नमः |*

हरिनामामृतव्याकरणम्

कृष्णमुपासितुमस्य स्रजमिव नामावलिं तनवै॥

त्वरितं वितरेदेषा तत्साहित्यादिजामोदम्॥१॥

* श्रीश्रीकृष्णचैतन्यचन्द्राय नमः *

“तत्त्वप्रदर्शिका टीका”

अर्द्धं तैकस्वरूपञ्च नित्यानन्दात्मधामकम् । नासामि तत्परं तत्त्वं कृष्णं चैतन्यविग्रहम्॥ नमामि । चरणाम्भोजं श्रीमद्गुरुदेवजीवपादानाम्॥ । यत्कृपाविभवैरयं नियुक्तो वराकोऽप्यमृतविभजने॥ स्वल्पायुषां कलियुगेऽत्र नृणां शमिच्छन् । शादानुशासन – महाजलधि विमथ्य॥

नामामृतं समददत् य इदं कृपालुः । स | श्रीलजीवचरणः शरणं ममास्तु॥ अथ कलियुगप्पावतस्य स्वयंभगवतः श्रीमत्कृष्णचैतन्यमहाप्रभोः प्रियपरिकरो, निखिल-शास्त्रोदधि-परिमर्थनोत्थ-भक्तिपीयूष-परिवेशको, विबुधवृन्द-वन्दित-पदारविन्दद्वन्द्वो, विश्ववैष्णवराजराजिवरेण्यो, भागवतपरमहंसाग्रगण्यः समाश्रितवृन्द्ारण्यस्तत्रभवान् श्रीलजीवगोस्वामिचरणो, भजनैकनिष्ठुतयाऽनधीत – व्याकरणानां प्रागधीतान्य व्याकरणानाश्च वैष्णवानां हितकाम्यया नामसंकेतेन व्युत्पत्तिवाञ्छयाच्च, स्वगुरु-श्रीमद्रूपगोस्वामिपाद-रचित-लघु-सूत्र-विस्तार-पारिपाठ्येन श्रीहरिनामामृताख्यं शब्दानुशासनमारभमाणः प्रारिप्सित-ग्रन्थ-निर्विघ्न-परिसमाप्त्यर्थ'शिष्टशिष्यवर्गशिक्षायै वस्तुनिर्देशात्मकमङ्गलमादौ निबध्नाति “कृष्ण'मिति । अनेन सर्व एव ग्रन्थोऽयं मङ्गलमयः इत्येव ज्ञापयति । कृष्णं स्वयम्भगवन्तम् । “कृष्णस्तु भगूवान् स्वयम्' इति श्रीमद्भागवतपरिभाषावचनप्रामाण्यात् । “यजन्ति त्वन्मयास्त्वां वै बहुमूत्र्येकमूत्तिकम्'इत्यक्रूिरोक्त्या भगवत्स्वरूपाणां सर्वेषां तदन्तः पातित्वाच्च । आकर्षति निखिलचराचरान् स्वमाधुर्यमहिम्ना

`स्वरूपानन्देन वेति ‘कृष्णः' । कृषेर्वर्णे,नक्, उणादेर्बाहुल्यात् संज्ञायाश्च । “कृषिर्भूवाचकः

शब्दो णश्च निवृतिवाचवः । तयोरैक्यं परं ब्रह्म कृष्ण इत्यभिधीयते' इति महाभारतम् ।

२ * श्रीश्रीहरिनामामृतव्याकरणम् *

'भूवाचक' इत्यत्र भावे विषु । भावोधात्वर्थ:, सचात्राक्षणं; नक् प्रत्ययश्व कर्तरि, तेनाकर्षण पूर्वकानन्ददायि-नराकृति-परब्रह्म कृष्णशब्दार्थः । श्यामलतमालत्विषि यशोदास्तनन्धये रूढि रिति नामकौमुदी । तमुपासितुमाराधयितुमित्यर्थः । अस्य श्रीकृष्णस्य तत्

संबंधिन इति यावत् । नाम्नामावलि श्रेणी स्रज पुष्पमाल्यमिव तनवै रचयानि। 'इच्छार्थ

धातुसत्व' इत्यनेन प्रार्थनायां विधातृलकारः। ‘कृपयासीत् स्वबन्धने' इति श्रीमद्भागवतसिद्धान्तेन भगवतः कृपा शक्तिमन्तरेण यथा दाम्ना तस्मैं बन्धनमसम्भवं तथा तन्नाम्नामपि । नामिनाम्निर्भेद्ध्रतः श्रीभगवत्कृपां प्रार्थयत इति हृदयम् । “ न कुर्यान्निष्फूलं कर्म्” इत्यतः फलमाह-एषेति । एषा मया तन्यमाना ग्रन्थनिबद्धनामावलिः, तत् सॊहित्यादिजामोदः-साहित्यं रूढिवृत्त्या काब्यात्मकग्रन्थविशेषः तत् तस्य श्रीकृष्णस्य सम्बन्धिसाहित्यं श्रीमद्भागवतम्, आदिना श्रीगोपालचम्पू-ललितमाधव-मुक्ताचरितादय-स्तेभ्यो जात अामोद आनन्द-स्तम् । – पक्षे तत्-तस्य श्रीकृष्णस्य साहित्यं साहचर्य', परिकरैः सह संसर्गः इति यावत् । आदिना आलिङ्गनं नमांदिकश्च । तस्माज्जात आामोदः परिमलस्तम् त्वरितं शीघ्र' यथा-स्यात्तथा वितरेत् दद्यात्; परिशीलकेभ्य इति शेषः । अर्ह-शत्कयोरित्यनेन विधिः । शक्तिः सामर्थ्यम् । तेन नामावलिः श्रीकृष्णसाहित्यादिजीमोर्द दातुं समर्थ एवेत्यर्थः ।

यद् वा एषा श्रीकॄष्णनामावलिस्तत् साहित्यादिजामोदं हितेनाऽविद्यामोचनरूप-*

मङ्गलेन सह वर्त्तमानेति सहिता भक्तिः, तस्य श्रीकृष्णस्य ( कृष्णसम्बन्धिनी ) सहिता तत्सहिता या शुद्धा कृष्णभक्तिस्तामर्हत्ोति तत्साहित्यं श्रीमद्भागवतम् । ‘मेनिरे भगवद्रूपं शास्त्रं भागवतं कलौ' इति प्राचीनप्रमाणाच्च । “तदर्हतीति' नृसिह् यः । तदादि यस्य तत्साहित्यादि श्रीमद्भागवतादि-भक्तिरसशास्त्रं भक्तिरसपात्रश्च । लक्षणया तदनुशीलनं सेवनश्च । तस्माज्जातं परानन्दं शीघ्र' वितरेत् । यद्यपि भगवन्नाममात्रस्यैव भागवतानन्दवितरणे स्वाभाविक्यसाधारणी शक्तिरस्त्येव तथापि तेषां ग्रथनं तु कण्ठधारणसौकयर्थि

मिति नायं निष्ऽफलप्रयासः ।

पक्षे कृष्णमिति सत्या सत्यभामा, भीम भीमसेन इतिवत् कृष्णं श्रीकृष्णचैतन्य- ।

देवम् । ‘सामर्थ्यमौचिती देशः कालो व्यक्तिः स्वरादयः' इत्यादिप्रमाणाद् देशकालौचित्यभेदेनार्थवैशिष्ट्य-स्वीकारा च स एवार्थः । कलियुगोपास्य-निर्णयप्रसंगे ‘कृष्णवर्ण' त्विषाकृष्णं साड्रोपाजूस्त्रपार्षदम्' इति श्रीमद्भागवतपद्यव्याख्यायां सर्वसम्वादिनी प्रारम्भे“श्रीश्रीकृष्णचैतन्यदेवनामानं श्रीभगवन्तं कलियुगेऽस्मिन् वैष्णवजनोपास्यावतारतये' त्याद्युक्तः स्वयं ग्रन्थकक्तरप्ययमेवाभिप्रायः । तमुपासितुं संकीर्त्तानप्राधान्येनाराधयितुं, “यज्ञैः संकीर्तनप्रायैर्यजन्ति हि सुमेधस' इत्युक्त: । अस्य श्रीकृष्णचैतन्यदेवस्य नाम्नां तत्प्रचारितानां वा नाम्नामावलिस्तत्साहित्यादिजामोदमिति पूर्ववत् । यद्वा तस्य श्रीभगवतः साहित्यं लीलादिश्रवणकीर्त्तनद्वारेण सह वर्त्तनं तत् संग इति यावत्; तदादियेषां स्मरणादीनां तानि तत्साहित्यादीनि तेभ्यो जातमामोंर्द चिरीदनर्पितोज्वलरसास्वादन – सुखविशेष शीघ्र' वितरेतू प्रदातुं शक्नुयात्र । नाम्नः परमपुरुषार्थदत्वप्रसिद्धरिति ।

== Saṁjñā-sandhi-prakaraṇam ==
- Saṁjñā-sandhi-prakaraṇam[BE1]
  1 / naAr"AyaNAAäu"àU"taAe'yaM vaNAR‚(ma: /
  1. nārāyaṇād udbhūto ’yaṁ varṇa-kramaḥ nārāyaṇāt—from Lord Nārāyaṇa; udbhūtaḥ—appeared; ayam—this; varṇa—of phonemes; kramaḥ—series. This series of varṇas (the Sanskrit alphabet) appeared from Nārāyaṇa.[1] a ā i ī u ū ṛ ṝ ḷ ḷ‾ e ai o au ṁ ḥ. ka kha ga gha ṅa ca cha ja jha ña ṭa ṭha ḍa ḍha ṇa ta tha da dha na pa pha ba bha ma ya ra la va śa ṣa sa ha kṣa. ete varṇā akṣarāṇi. eṣām udbhava-sthānāni—a-ā-ka-varga-ha-visargāṇāṁ kaṇṭhaḥ. i-ī-ca-varga-ya-śānāṁ tālu. u-ū-pa-vargāṇām oṣṭhaḥ. ṛ-ṝ-ṭa-varga-ra-ṣāṇāṁ mūrdhā. ḷ- ḷ‾-ta-varga-la-sānāṁ dantāḥ. ed-aitoḥ kaṇṭha-tālu. od-autoḥ kaṇṭhauṣṭham. va-kārasya dantauṣṭham. anusvārasya śiro nāsikā vā. ----[1] In Pāṇini's system, the most popular system of Sanskrit grammar in India, the varṇa-krama in the form of the fourteen pratyāhāra-sūtras is said to have emanated from Lord Śiva. But in Hari-nāmāmṛta-vyākaraṇa the varṇa-krama is traced back to Lord Nārāyaṇa, who is glorified throughout the Vedic literature as the Supreme Lord. ----[BE1]Between this heading and the first sutra there is a note in course about the format of translation and order of commentaries etc.

Saṁśodhinī—The Sanskrit word varṇa is most literally translated as a phoneme, or speech-sound. To translate the word varṇa as a letter is erroneous, because a letter is defined as a written or printed symbol employed to represent a speech-sound. The phonemes, having arisen from Nārāyaṇa, are eternal whereas the letters used to represent them may vary. For example, before the introduction of printing into India in the eighteenth century, the script in which Sanskrit was written and taught varied from place to place and was the same, or almost the same as that used in writing the local vernacular language. The dissemination of printed Sanskrit texts, however, encouraged the predominance of one form of writing, the Devanāgarī script of central India in which the modern languages Hindī and Marāṭhī are also written. Today most Sanskrit publications are printed in this [null script][BE1] .

Explanation of varṇa-krama:

According to MW, varṇa-krama means “order or series of letters, alphabetical arrangement, alphabet.”

Amṛta explains varṇa-krama as varṇānāṁ kramaḥ kramaśo nirgamanam (“the issuing forth sequentially by the varṇas[1][MA2] ”).

Bāla offers the following explanation: varṇāni udbhūtāni tat-kramaś ca udbhūta ity arthaḥ (“Both the varṇas and their order appeared from Nārāyaṇa”).

[1] Amṛta further explains that the word krama is formed by applying the kṛt pratyaya [gh]a[ṇ] after the dhātu kram[u] pāda-vikṣepe (1P or 4P, “to step, walk”) in bhāve prayoga. Thus the word varṇānām is not sambandha-ṣaṣṭhī here, rather it is the anukta-kartā taking ṣaṣṭhī by kartṛ-karmaṇoḥ ṣaṣṭhī kṛd-yoge (). All of this will become clear in the Kāraka-prakaraṇa.

[BE1]This samsodhini has one more sentence in course: " The sounds (varëas) of the Sanskrit alphabet are enumerated below in both Devanägaré script and roman transliteration."

[MA2]reference the sütra in the footnote

The sounds (varëas) of the Sanskrit alphabet are enumerated below by showing the letters used to represent them in Devanägaré and roman transliteration.[MA1]

Våtti[1]—The varëa-krama is as follows:

| @ a | @A ä | w i | wR é | o u | O ü | [% å | \# è | la{ ÿ | la| ÿ‾ | W e | We ai | @Ae o | @AE au |

| @M à | @: ù |

(Here the @ in @M and @: is just to aid pronunciation, the actual letters are just M and :)

| k( ka | Ka kha | gA ga | Ga gha | x~ ìa |
| ca ca | C$ cha | ja ja | Ja jha | Ha ïa |
| q% öa | Q& öha | x" òa | X# òha | NA ëa |
| ta ta | Ta tha | d" da | Da dha | na na |
| pa pa | P( pha | ba ba | Ba bha | ma ma |

| ya ya | r" ra | la la | va va |
| zA ça | Sa ña | s$a sa | h" ha |

ºa kña

These sounds are called varëas, akñaras, or al-s.

[1] The våttis (“fundamental explanations of the sütras”) were also written by Jéva Gosvämé. In the våttis, Jéva Gosvämé clarifies the sütra, gives examples, supplies extra information, and mentions the opinions of other grammarians. The Dhätu-saìgraha (“list of dhätus”) was also composed by Jéva Gosvämé. The Avyaya-çabda-saìgraha (“list of avyayas”), however, is an anonymous appendix, probably composed by Purédäsa, found only in some of the printed editions of the Hari-nämämåta, and the Gaëa-päöha (“list of gaëas”) belongs to Päëini.

[MA1]Put a sentence like refer to the BBT pronunciation guide ..

Saàçodhiné—It will be explained in sütra 17 that all the varëas from ka to ha, the consonants of the Sanskrit alphabet, are dependent on the vowels for their pronunciation. That is to say, it is impossible to pronounce a consonant without the aid of a vowel. For this reason all the varëas from ka to ha are listed with an inherent a. But actually these varëas refer to the consonants themselves, regardless of the adjacent vowel. Thus the varëa ka refers to k, the varëa kha to kh, and so on. One should not be confused by the various labels such as “the varëa ka,” ka-räma, ka-kära, and k; they all refer to the same consonant k, never to k+a. This is the case for all the varëas from ka to ha. One should also be careful not to mistake kh, gh, ch, and so on, to be a combination of k+h, g+h, c+h, and so on, because in roman transliteration the h in kh and so on is employed merely to indicate that the varëa is an aspirated consonant. It is impossible for kh and so on to be conjunct consonants since in Sanskrit there are no conjunct consonants that have h as their second member.

The varëas from a to au, the vowels of the Sanskrit alphabet, are written differently when they come after a consonant. A, however, has no post-consonantal symbol and is assumed to come after every consonant unless there is another vowel or a viräma in its place. The post consonantal forms of the vowels are shown below with the consonant k to indicate their proper placement.

k( ka, k(A kä, ik( ki, k(L ké, ku( ku, kU( kü, k{( kå, k|( kè, k}( kÿ, k}{ k ÿ‾, ke( ke, kE( kai, k(Ae ko, k(AE kau.

In the following special cases the post consonantal symbols of u, ü, and å are put in different places:

ç& ru, è& rü, [null ä{"] [MAD1] då, ô$ hå.

The viräma ( ,) is a small oblique stroke, placed at the foot of a consonant, that is used to signal the deletion of its inherent a. Thus ak would be written in Devanägaré as @k,(. The symbol called avagraha (') and the various conjunct consonants will be explained in Saàçodhiné 67 and Saàçodhiné 82 respectively. Extra symbols are also employed in the Devanägaré script for the purpose of basic punctuation. For example, the sign / is used at the end of a half-verse or sentence, and the sign // at the end of a verse or paragraph. The numbers of the Devanägaré script are as follows:

| 1 | 2 | 3 | 4 | 5 | 6 | 7 | 8 | 9 | 0 |
| 1 | 2 | 3 | 4 | 5 | 6 | 7 | 8 | 9 | 0 |

[MAD1]maybe use a different font which more accurately represents the character

Pratyähära-sütras

Generally the alternate monosyllabic names found in the våttis of the Saàjïä-sandhi-prakaraëa, like the name al here, should be assumed to be pratyähäras from Päëini's Añöädhyäyé. Where this is not the case, we will list the source of the name separately. Pratyähära literally means “withdrawal.” In grammar, however, the term pratyähära refers to the abbreviation of a series of varëas into one syllable by combining the first member with the indicatory letter of the last member. It is said that Lord Çiva revealed the following 14 pratyähära-sütras (often called the Maheçvara-sütras or Çiva-sütras) unto the sage Päëini, author of the famous Añöädhyäyé (literally, “a collection of eight chapters”), by sounding his òamaru drum. All the pratyähäras like al are formed by means of these sütras:

1. a i u[ë]; 2. å ÿ[k]; 3. e o[ì]; 4. ai au[c]; 5. ha ya va ra[ö]; 6. la[ë]; 7. ïa ma ìa ëa na[m]; 8. jha bha[ï]; 9. gha òha dha[ñ]; 10. ja ba ga òa da[ç]; 11. kha pha cha öha tha ca öa ta[v]; 12. ka pa[y]; 13. ça ña sa[r]; 14. ha[l].

In these pratyähära-sütras the letters in brackets are indicatory letters, not to be counted among the group of varëas indicated by the pratyähära. And a, i, u, å, and ÿ in the first two sütras stand for both the long and short forms of those vowels--a and ä, i and é, u and ü, å and è, and ÿ and ÿ‾ respectively. The pratyähära al therefore indicates the group of varëas beginning from a in the first pratyähära-sütra and ending with ha, which has the indicatory letter l, in the fourteenth pratyähära-sütra. Thus the pratyähära al indicates the whole alphabet. Similarly The pratyähära ac indicates the group of varëas beginning from a in the first pratyähära-sütra and ending with au, which has the indicatory letter c, in the fourth pratyähära-sütra. Thus the pratyähära ac indicates all the vowels. Other pratyähäras are made in the same way. In these sütras both ha and the indicatory letter ë appears twice. Although this may seem to cause problems, they are resolved as follows: The pratyähära aë is conventionally understood to be formed with the indicatory ë in the first sütra, while the pratyähära ië is conventionally understood to be formed with the indicatory letter ë in the sixth sütra. It was necessary to repeat ha twice in these sütras so that it could be included in such pratyähäras as haç and ië, and at the same time be included in pratyähäras like val, jhal, and çal. In pratyähäras like al and hal where ha appears twice it should not be taken as two separate varëas.[1]

Alternate readings of the varëa-krama:

In the Haridäsa edition the viñëucäpa is included in the alphabet as coming after the viñëucakra, but this is unfounded as both commentaries don’t include it and its place of pronunciation is given only later in våtti 15. If it were meant to be included here in the alphabet its place of pronunciation should have been given here in this våtti as was done for all the other members of the alphabet.

In the Haridäsa, Purédäsa, and Caitanya Maöha editions, which are all based on Bäla, kña is included as the final member of the alphabet. But in the Kåñëadäsa edition, which is based on Amåta, kña is not to be found. Indeed, its absence is confirmed by the following excerpts from the Amåta commentary on this sütra: a-rämädi-ha-rämänto varëa-kramaù (“the alphabet beginning with a and ending with ha”) and varëänäm ekona-païcäçat-prakäratvaà darçitaà (“the alphabet is shown as being 49- fold”). Furthermore, kña is generally not included in the alphabets listed in other Sanskrit Grammars [null also][BE1] .

On the other hand, Viçvanätha Cakravarté Öhäkura explains in his book Manträrtha-dépikä that Harinämämåta-vyäkaraëa lists fifty varëas in total and that the Rädha-kåñëa-sahasra-näma-stotra of Båhan-Näradéya Puräëa mentions païcäçad-varëa-rüpiëé (“she who is the embodiment of the fifty varëas”) as one of the names of Çrématé Rädhäräëé. Similarly, even though Bäla also says a-rämädi-ha-rämänto varëa-kramaù (“the alphabet beginning with a and ending with ha”), it contains an extra phrase: atra ka-ña-saàyoge kña iti vakñyamäëatve ’pi kña-rämaç ca darçitaù (“Although it will be explained in våtti 17 that kña is the combination of the consonants ka and ña, kña is also shown here”). The ultimate deciding point, however, is that Jéva Gosvämé does list kña in the alphabet when he elaborates upon the varëas in his Krama-sandarbha commentary for Bhägavatam 11.12.17 (see Appendix II). Furthermore, Jéva Gosvämé also uses the word kña-rämasya in sütra 283 which indicates beyond a doubt that kña is considered an additional varëa because according to sütra 37 the word räma could not be added to it as we understand from sütra 37 that the word räma is only used to refer to a varëa. Even though kña is accepted as a varëa in this way, it is not counted as a viñëujana because, in våtti 17, Jéva Gosvämé clearly says ka-kärädayo ha-käräntä varëä viñëujana-nämäno bhavanti [null ...][MAD2]  ka-ña-saàyoge tu kñaù (“The varëas beginning with ka and ending with ha are called viñëujanas. Kña, however, is only the combination of ka and ña”). But even this statement suggests that kña is actually included as the final member of the alphabet, otherwise there would be no need to exclude it from the viñëujanas. Taking these reasons into consideration, we also have included kña as the final member of the alphabet in this edition.

Śrīla Prabhupāda also gives an interesting explanation of the name Adhokñaja which supports the inclusion of kña: “And in Sanskrit, as in English it is A to Z, similarly in Sanskrit, a, ä, i, u, and the end is kña. So a and kña, that is called akña. Akña-ja. And ja means generated. So we also compose words, those who are Sanskrit scholars, they compose words from a to kña, just like English they compose words from A to Z. So our mental speculation and advancement of education is limited between this a and kña, akña. Akña-ja. But Kåñëa is adhokñaja. Adhokñaja means where these kinds of speculation, beginning from a to kña, will not act. Therefore His name is Adhokñaja. Adhaù kåta, cut down.” (Lecture on Çrémad-Bhägavatam 1.8.19—Mäyäpura, September 29, 1974).

Amåta—Someone may wonder, “It was stated that the varëas and their order appeared from Näräyaëa[MA3] [2], but from where did each varëa appear?” To answer this, Jéva Gosvämé specifies each varëa’s place of appearance:

Våtti—The place of appearance of these varëas is as below and so on[3].

The place of appearance of a, ä, ka-varga (ka, kha, ga, gha, ìa), ha, and visarga (ù) is the throat of Näräyaëa.

The place of appearance of i, é, ca-varga (ca, cha, ja, jha, ïa), ya, and ça is the palate of Näräyaëa.

The place of appearance of u, ü, and pa-varga (pa, pha, ba, bha, ma) is the lips of Näräyaëa.

The place of appearance of å, è, öa-varga (öa, öha, òa, òha, ëa), ra, and ña is the top of the palate of Näräyaëa.

The place of appearance of ÿ, ÿ‾, ta-varga (ta, tha, da, dha, na), la, and sa is the teeth of Näräyaëa.

The place of appearance of e and ai is the throat and the palate of Näräyaëa.

The place of appearance of o and au is the throat and the lips of Näräyaëa.

The place of appearance of v is the teeth and the lips of Näräyaëa.

The place of appearance of anusvära (à) is either the head or nose of Näräyaëa.

Saàçodhiné—Because the varëas appeared from Näräyaëa in these specific places, these are the proper places to pronounce the varëas. The varëas a, ä, ka-varga (ka, kha, ga, gha, ìa), ha, and visarga (ù) are called kaëöhya because their place of pronunciation is the throat (kaëöha). The varëas i, é, ca-varga (ca, cha, ja, jha, ïa), ya, and ça are called tälavya because their place of pronunciation is the palate (tälu). Other names, also made according to the place of pronunciation, are shown below along with their English equivalents.

| Guttural (kaëöhya) | @ a | @A ä | k( ka | Ka kha | gA ga | Ga gha | [null X~][BE4] ìa | h" ha | @:ù |
| Palatal (tälavya) | w i | wR é | ca ca | C$ cha | ja ja | Ja jha | Ha ïa | ya ya | zA ça |
| Labial (oñöhya) | o u | O ü | pa pa | P( pha | ba ba | Ba bha | ma ma | | |
| Cerebral (mürdhanya) | [% å | \# è | q% öa | Q& öha | x" òa | X# òha | NA ëa | r" ra | Sa ña |
| Dental (dantya) | la{ ÿ | la| ÿ‾ | ta ta | Ta tha | d" da | Da dha | na na | la la | s$a sa |

| Gutturo-palatal (kaëöha-tälavya) | W e | We ai |
| Gutturo-labial (kaëöhauñöhya) | @Ae o | @AE au |
| Dento-labial (dantauñöhya) | va va | |
| Either in the head or in the nose (çiro näsikä vä) | @M à | |

Amåta—Explanation of Näräyaëa:

[1] The pratyähäras have been dealt with only briefly in this book; for more details consult Añöädhyäyé or Siddhänta-kaumudé.

[2] In this sütra Näräyaëa is the apädäna (“origin”) by prabhave tat-sthänam (982), because the eternal varëas, already existing within the Lord, are manifest from Him. The word näräyaëa then becomes näräyaëät as an apädäna takes païcamé (“the fifth case ending”) by apädäne païcamé (981). Here Bäla says Näräyaëa is an apädäna by janane prakåtiù (983), but that is incorrect as the varëas are eternal sounds and thus are not produced at any time. In this regard, Jéva Gosvämé defines the difference between prabhava and janana in våtti by saying prabhavaù prathama-darçanam, jananam utpattir iti bhedaù (“Prabhava is the first sight of something that already exists, while janana is the appearance of something that didn’t exist previously”).

[3] The meaning of the word ity-ädéni, “these and so on”, at the end of this våtti will be seen in sütras 15, 25, 131, and 132 where further varëas and their places of pronunciation are mentioned.

[BE1]"Either" would be better than "also" here.

[MAD2]check with an editor how to use the elypsis

[MA3]reference the sütras in the footnote

[BE4]This is not the right aksara.

Here the word nara (“human”) means a Vraja-väsé (“resident of Våndävana”), and the whole community of Vraja-väsés is called nära. The vigraha (“separation of the constituent words”) of the compound word näräyaëa is: näram ayanam yasya saù näräyaëaù (“Näräyaëa is He whose shelter is the Vraja-väsés”) Thus the word näräyaëa here means Çré Kåñëa, the Supreme Personality of Godhead who appears in a human-like form.

This understanding is backed up by the Bhägavatam (10.25.18): tasmän mac-charaëaà goñöhaà / man-näthaà mat-parigraham, where Kåñëa Himself states that the Vraja-väsés are His shelter, His protectors, and His family. In this verse the word goñöham implies the goñöha-väsés, and goñöha-väsés means vraja-väsés because the word goñöha is a synonym of the word vraja[1]. Kåñëa says that the Vraja-väsés are His shelter because He, being controlled by their love, is unable to even bathe, drink, eat, sleep, or enjoy without them. Thus in the Ädi Puräëa Kåñëa tells Arjuna:

sahäyä guravaù çiñyä

bhujiñyä bändhaväù striyaù

satyaà vadämi te pärtha

gopyaù kià me bhavanti na

“The gopés are My assistants, My gurus, My disciples, My maidservants, My relatives, and My consorts. O son of Påthä, I tell you the truth. What aren’t the gopés for Me?”

Even though the word näräyaëa can be used to express any viñëu-tattva, it primarily refers to Kåñëa, because He is the original Näräyaëa and because the avatäras headed by Matsya and Vämana, and even the three Puruñas are His parts (aìgas). This is corroborated by Lord Brahmä's statement in Bhägavatam (10.14.14):

näräyaëas tvaà na hi sarva-dehinäm

 ätmäsy adhéçäkhila-loka-säkñé

näräyaëo ’ìgaà nara-bhü-jaläyanät

 tac cäpi satyaà na tavaiva mäyä

“Are You not the original Näräyaëa, O supreme controller, since You are the Soul of every embodied being and the eternal witness of all created realms? Indeed, Lord Näräyaëa is Your expansion, and He is called Näräyaëa because He is the generating source of the primeval water of the universe. He is real, not a product of Your illusory Mäyä.”[MA1]

In his commentary on this verse, Çrédhara Svämé gives the following definitions of the name Näräyaëa: näro jéva-samüho ’yanam äçrayo yasya saù (“He whose abode is the aggregate of jévas”), and närasyäyanaà pravåttir yasmät saù (“He from whom the aggregate of jévas arises”). In explaining the phrase näräyaëo ’ìgam in this verse, Çrédhara Svämé gives an alternate etymology of the word näräyaëa for when it is used to refer to the well-known Näräyaëa who is a plenary portion of Kåñëa: naräd udbhütä ye ’rthäç catur-viàçati-tattväni tathä naräj jätaà yaj jalaà tad-ayanäd yo näräyaëa prasiddhaù so ’pi tavaiväìgaà mürtiù (“That Näräyaëa who is well-known because of His entering the twenty-four elements that appeared from Nara and the water that was produced from Nara, is also Your plenary portion[2]”).

In his Bhägavatam commentary named Krama-sandarbha, Jéva Gosvämé defines Näräyaëa in the following way: naräëäà dvitéya-tåtéya-puruña-bhedänäà samüho näraà tat-samañöi-rüpaù prathama-puruña eva; tasyäpy ayanaà pravåttir yasmät sa näräyaëaù (“Nära means the first Puruña, Käraëodaka-çäyé Viñëu, the aggregate form of the Naras who are the second and third Puruñas, Garbhodaka-çäyé Viñëu and Kñérodaka-çäyé Viñëu. Näräyaëa is He from whom even Käraëodaka-çäyé Viñëu arises”).

Saàçodhiné—It is well known that Lord Caitanya often called Advaita Äcärya, the celebrated incarnation of Mahä Viñëu (Käraëodaka-çäyé Viñëu), by the name Näòä. This is recorded both in the Caintanya-bhägavata and in the Caitanya-caritämåta. For example, in Caitanya-bhägavata (Madhya 2.264), Lord Caitanya says “By your loud chanting and Näòä's roaring I left Vaikuëöha and came here with My associates.” In his Gauòéya-bhäñya commentary to this verse, Çréla Bhaktisiddhänta Sarvasvaté Öhäkura explains the word näòä as follows:

“The editor of Çré Sajjana-toñaëé, Çrémad Bhaktivinoda Öhäkura, has written in Volume 7, Part 11, as follows: “Çréman Mahäprabhu often addressed Çréla Advaita Prabhu as Näòä. I have heard a number of meanings of the word näòä. Some Vaiñëava scholar has said that the word närä refers to Mahä-Viñëu because nära, the total aggregate of all living entities, is situated within Him. Is the word näòä a corruption of the word närä? The people of Räòha-deça often use òa in place of ra. Is this the reason that the word närä has been written as näòä? This meaning is often applicable.” The word nära or närä (näòä) is explained by Çrédhara Svämipäda in his Bhävärtha-dépikä commentary on Çrémad-Bhägavatam (10.14.14) as follows: “The word nära refers to the aggregate of living entities, and the word ayana refers to the shelter. You are Näräyaëa Himself because You are the supreme shelter of all embodied souls. You are Näräyaëa because all the propensities (ayana) of the living entities (nära) emanate from You. You are the supreme Näräyaëa because You know (ayana) all living entities (nära). You are renowned as Näräyaëa because You are the supreme shelter (ayana) of the water that emanates from Nara.” In the småtis it is stated: “All the truths born from Nara are known as närän by the learned scholars. Since the Supreme Lord is the shelter of this närän, learned scholars glorify Him as Näräyaëa.” In the Manu-saàhitä (1.10) it is stated: “The waters are called nära, for they emanate from the Supersoul, Nara. As they are His original resting place (ayana), He is named Näräyaëa.””

[1] See the last sütra of Kådanta-prakaraëa.

[2] The Näräyaëa referred to here is Garbhodaka-çäyé Viñëu. Garbhodaka-çäyé Viñëu is also called Nara. When Nara entered the universe, He saw that within the universe there was only darkness and space, without a resting place. Thus He filled half of the universe with water from His own perspiration and laid Himself down on the same water. Because this water in the form of perspiration was produced from Nara, it is called Nära, and because Nara lies down on this water he is called Näräyaëa (“One whose resting place is the water called Nära”).

[MA1]we can use the CC translation of this if it is more suitable

== Book Published ==
- [ Śrī Harināmāmṛta Vyākaraṇam by Jīva; Gosvāmī; in English by Matsya Avatar Das; Publisher: Rasabihari Lal and Sons 2017]
- Śrī Harināmāmṛta Vyākaraṇam by Jīva; Gosvāmī; Edited by Rāsvihārī Sānkhyatīrtha; Publisher: Murshidabad Rāmdeva Miśra 1910
- Śrī Harināmāmṛta Vyākaraṇam by Jīva Gosvāmī; Edited by Bhaktisiddhānta Sarasvatī; Publisher: Dhaka Śacīnāth Raya Caudhurī 1947
- Śrī Harināmāmṛta Vyākaraṇam by Jīva Gosvāmī; Edited by Bhaktisiddhānta Sarasvatī; Bala-toshani Commentary; Commentator: Sri Hare Krishna Acharya
- Śrī Harināmāmṛta Vyākaraṇam comm. 'Bālatoṣaṇa' by Jīva Gosvāmī; Publisher: Murshidabad Brajanāth Miśra 1930
- Śrī Harināmāmṛta Vyākaraṇam by Jīva Gosvāmī; Edited by Purīdāsa; Publisher: Dhaka Śacīnāth Raya Caudhurī 1947
- Śrī Harināmāmṛta Vyākaraṇam by Jīva Gosvāmī; Publisher:Sri Gadadhara-Gaurahari Press; Available at Khandelwal Book Stores, Loi Bazar, Vrindavan
- Samkshepa-hari-namamrta-vyakarana by Jīva Gosvāmī; Publisher:Sri Gadadhara-Gaurahari Press; Available at Khandelwal Book Stores, Loi Bazar, Vrindavan
- Śrī Harināmāmṛta Vyākaraṇam by Jīva Gosvāmī; Edited by Matsya-Avatara Das; Publisher: V.I.H.E, Vrindavan

== Courses based on Śrī Harināmāmṛta Vyākaraṇam ==
- SHORT-TERM SANSKRIT COURSE, V.I.H.E, Vrindavan, Mathura, India
- V.I.H.E Intensive Sanskrit Course, Vrindavan, Mathura, India
- Sanskrit Level One, M.I.H.E, Mayapur, West Bengal, India
- Sanskrit Level Two, M.I.H.E, Mayapur, West Bengal, India
