= Satyanarayana Dasa =

Indian Gaudiya Vaisnava scholar and practitioner (born 1954)

Dr. Satyanarayana dasa
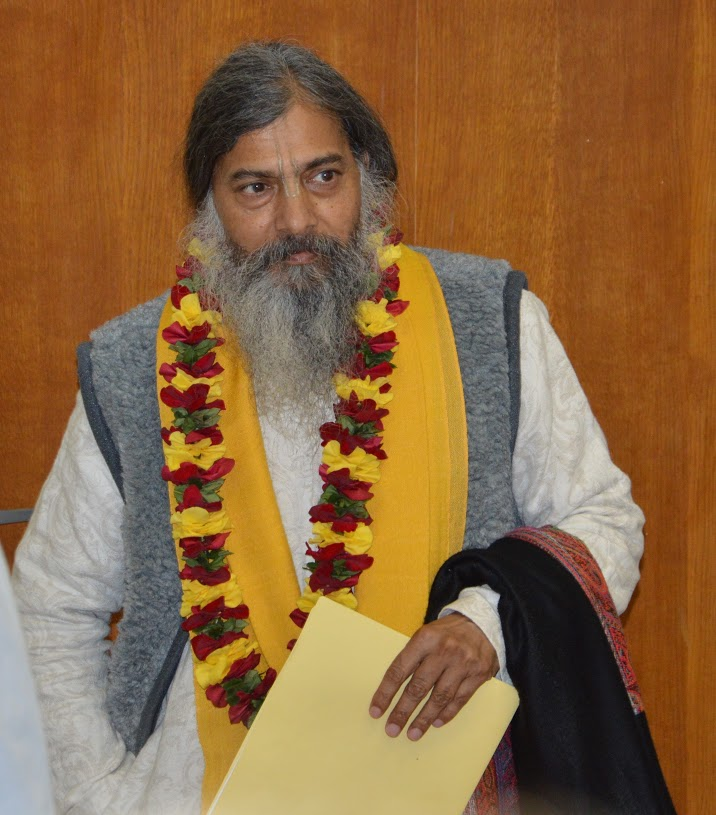
- Title: Babaji

Personal life
- Born: 9 June 1954 Faridabad, Haryana
- Notable work(s): Sat Sandarbhas, Bhagavad Gita
- Other name: Satyanarayana Dasa Babaji
- Website: Official Website of Jiva Institute

Religious life
- Religion: Vaishnavism
- Temple: Gaur-Gadadhara temple
- Philosophy: Achintya Bheda Abheda
- Lineage: Gadadhara parivara
- Sect: Gaudiya Vaishnavism

Senior posting
- Teacher: Haridas Shastri
- Based in: Vrindavan, India
- Post: Director of Jiva Institute
- Predecessor: Haridas Shastri

Dr. Satyanarayana Dasa (born 9 June 1954) is an Indian Gaudiya Vaisnava scholar and practitioner. Dasa is a polymath, holding a Ph.D. in Sanskrit from Agra University, a degree in Indian law from Agra University, a Bachelors of Technology in Mechanical engineering from the Indian Institute of Technology and a Masters of Technology in Industrial Engineering from the Indian Institute of Technology. Currently based in India at the Jiva Institute, which he founded, Dasa has published numerous books and original papers in the field of Gaudiya Vaisnavism including translations and commentaries on the Sat Sandarbhas. His honors include an award from the President of India in 2012. Dasa has been called a leading living practitioner-scholar of Jīva Gosvāmin.

== Early life and career ==
Satyanarayana Dasa grew up in a village named Palla near Faridabad, Haryana in India. His primary education happened in the village school, and secondary education in the Government school of Malviya Nagar, Delhi. During his IIT years, he was also an avid sportsman who represented IIT Delhi in hockey and weightlifting. After working for a few years for a company in Miami, he returned to India to study Sanskrit. It is in Vrindavan, while still a member of ISKCON (he was previously an initiated disciple of ISKCON guru Bhaktisvarupa Damodar Swami), that he met Shri Haridas Sastri Maharaja, one of the eminent scholars and saints of India. From him he studied the entire range of Gaudiya Vaisnava literature. He also learned the six systems of Indian philosophy under Swami Shyama Sharana Maharaja and various other traditional gurus with a special focus on Nyaya (Indian logic). In 1994, while translating and commenting on Jiva Gosvami's Sad Sandarbhas, a philosophical controversy arose about the falldown of the jiva from Vaikuntha, which culminated in the publication of Satyanarayana's book, "In Vaikuntha not even the Leaves Fall", co-authored with Kundali Das. When ISKCON authorities refused to accept his presentation of traditional Vaisnava teaching regarding the origin and nature of the soul, he officially separated himself from that organization and took diksa (formal initiation) and babaji vesa (Vaishnava sannyas) in the traditional Gaudiya Vaishnava line of Sri Gadadhara Pandita, the Gadadhara parivara, from his guru Sri Haridas Sastri.

Dr. Dasa has been bestowed with the "Grateful to Gurus 2023" award by Indica, an institute for Indian knowledge systems and has been called a living legend of Gaudiya Vaishnavism.

== Publications ==
Dr. Dasa's research is in the philosophy and theology of the Caitanya School of Vaisnavism. He has published more than 20 books including original translations and commentaries of the Sat-sandarbhas by Jiva Goswami. He has contributed to different research journals with other academics. He teaches Indian scripture to scholars.

His doctoral research focused on Jiva Goswami’s Bhakti Sandarbha.

=== Academic reception ===
In a book review of Dasa's translation of the Bhagavat Sandarbha, Aleksandar Uskokov from the University of Chicago called it "the first serious translation of the second Sandarbha, Bhagavat, in any European language". Uskokov suggests that Dasa "clearly knows Jiva's works in and out and is at home with this high point of Sanskrit learning in the sixteenth century and the traditions from which Jiva draws ideas, such as Vedic hermeneutics, Sanskrit grammar, Indian epistemology and poetics, and so on". Overall, Uskokov considers the book "an important event in our attempts to understand Gaudiya Vaishnavism", and that the translation is "precise and reliable, the arguments accurately understood, and the comments well informed by their intellectual background".

Jonathan Edelmann at the University of Florida calls the translation "readable and generally accurate and true to the original text". Noting that the "translator’s commentary brings to the discussion a breadth of learning from Nyāya, Mīmāṃsā, Pāṇini, Advaita-Vedānta, as well as other Gauḍīya Vaiṣṇava thinkers such as Viśvanātha Cakravartin, Rūpa Gosvāmin, etc.", he concludes that the book "offers a wealth of theological content and insight".

Edwin Bryant at Rutgers University commented that Dasa's Bhagavat Sandarbha "combines superb Sanskrit and hermeneutical skills rendered in accordance with academic standards of scholarship".

== Educational activities ==
Dr. Dasa has lectured or taught at various universities, such as Universite Terre de Ciel, France, Heidelberg University and University of Tübingen, Germany, Zürich University, Switzerland, Mississippi State University, Rutgers, The State University of New Jersey, and University of Florida, Gainesville, USA. Currently he is a visiting Faculty at Rutgers and an Adjunct Faculty member at the Hindu University of America.

He regularly teaches scholars from different universities on personal request. He travels to different countries and delivers lectures on Indian scriptures (Kripalu Yoga Center, Yoga Vida, Iyengar, NY).

Dr. Dasa has developed a new subject, Jiva Vedic Psychology, based on his studies and experience of Indian scriptures. He is currently training psychotherapists of Sandy Pines hospital, Florida and Fort Lauderdale Hospital in new techniques of treating patients through Vedic Psychology. He also lectures to different audiences in various countries such as US, Poland, Lithuania, France, Japan.

=== Jiva Institute ===
Under the guidance of Haridas Shastri Maharaj and with the assistance of his brothers Rishi and Dr. Partap Chauhan, Satyanarayana Dasa founded the Jiva Institute in 1992. The Jiva Institute has three divisions: education, health and culture. Satyanarayana Dasa is the director of the cultural division, located at Sheetal Chaya in Vrindavan, India. Students from India and abroad come there to study Sanskrit, and the six systems of Indian thought, called Sad-darshana. Specialization in the study of Gaudiya Vaishnava literature is the unique feature of Jiva Institute. Scholars come to consult with Satyanarayana Dasa and to access books in the library, which has a collection of printed as well as rare handwritten manuscripts. The other two divisions of education and Ayurveda are located at Faridabad. The education division runs a high school and has about 1800 students. The Ayurveda division has 70 clinics all over India and three tele-medicine centers that receive about 6000 calls per day and offers free consultation to patients.

In 2016, Dasa started a five-year course in Indian schools of philosophy running each year from Oct. to end of April at the Jiva Institute, co-taught by Dr. Jan Brzezinski, and visiting professors, such as Prof. Matthew Dasti, Prof. Edwin Bryant and Prof. Jack Hawley, Koenraad Elst, and Dr. Mans Broo.

Jiva Institute runs a Sanskrit school that is affiliated with Sampoornananda Sanskrit University Benares. There is also a branch of the school at Radhakunda.

== Bibliography ==
=== Books ===
- Tattva-sandarbha: first of the six Sandarbhas written by Jiva Gosvami. New Delhi, Jiva Institute for Vaisnava Studies, 1995, 424 p.
- Bhakti-Sandarbha: three volumes; New Delhi: Jiva Institute, 2005.
- Bhagavat Mahatmya, from Padma Purana: translation and commentary, New Delhi, Jiva Institute, 2002.
- In Vaikuntha not even the Leaves Fall; New Delhi: Jiva Institute, 1994, 305 p.
- Hitopadesa of Narayana Pandita: New Delhi, Jiva Institute, 1997.
- The Yoga of Dejection: New Delhi: Jiva Institute, 2000
- Nama-Tattva, New Delhi, Jiva Institute, 2001.
- Message to Disciples; New Delhi: Jiva Institute, 2001
- The Yoga of Eating; New Delhi: Jiva Institute, 2007
- Spiritual Health; New Delhi: Jiva Institute, 2007.
- Sri Guru Smaranam, Vrindavan 2014
- Bhagavat Sandarbha: God, His Qualities, Abode and Associates, Althusried; Germany, 2015
- Bhagavad Gita - Sara-samanvita: Sanskrit Text with English translation and summary; Althusried, Germany, 2015
- Sri Guru Darsanam, Vrindavan, 2015
- Tattva Sandarbha: Vaisnava Epistemology and Ontology, Althusried, Germany, 2015
- Paramatma Sandarbha: The Living Being, Its Bondage and The Immanent Absolute; Althusried, Germany, 2016
- Sadhana Guide, Vrindavan, 2016
- Kṛṣṇa Sandarbha. Germany: Jiva Institute, 2018
- Prīti Gīti, Jiva Institute 2018
- Sanskrit Non-Translatables, co-authored with Rajiv Malhotra. Manjul Publishing House, 2020
- Jiva Tattva, Jiva Institute, 2021
- Bhagavata Mahatmya, revised edition, Lithuania 2021
- Bhakti Sandarbha in 2 vols, Germany 2021

=== Papers ===
- "The Six Treatises of Srila Jiva Gosvami - An Overview in 7 parts" by Satya Narayana Dasa and Kundali Dasa, in the Back to Godhead magazine, 1992 (Vol. 26, No. 6) to 1993 (Vol. 27, No. 1)
- "The Concept of Saranagati in the Caitanya School of Vaisnavism" Proceedings of Ananthacharya Indological Research Institute of Mumbai National Seminar on Saranagati, 2002
- ‘The Philosophy and Theology of the Caitanya School of Vaisnavism’, in ‘Theistic Vedanta’, a volume in Project of History of Indian Science, Philosophy and Culture. (25 Volumes) New Delhi: Oxford University Press, 2003.
- "Caitanya and the Bengal School of Vaiṣṇavism", in History of Science, Philosophy and Culture in Indian Civilization, Vol, II, Part 3: Theistic Vedanta, New Delhi, Pauls Press, 2003, ISBN 81-87586-12-5
- "Synthesis of Yoga in the Caitanya School," in History of Indian Science, Philosophy and Culture in Indian Civilization, Vol. XVI, Part 4: Synthesis of Yoga, New Delhi: Oxford University Press, 2011, ISBN 978-81-87586-50-0
- "The Six Sandarbhas of Jiva Goswami" in Sources of the Krishna Tradition. Ed. Bryant, Edwin F. Oxford University Press, (2007), p. 373-408.
- "The Concept of Bhagavan in Bengal Vaishnavism as Found in Jiva Goswami’s Bhagavat Sandarbha" in Journal of Vaishnava Studies, Vol. 18, No. 1, Fall 2009
- "Un esprit calme et ferme" in Source pour une vie reliee, No. 20, 2012
- "Agency in the Gauḍīya Vaiṣṇava Tradition" by Satyanarayana Dasa and Jonathan B. Edelmann in Free Will Agency and Selfhood in Indian Philosophy, ed.by Matthew R. Dasti and Edwin F. Bryant, Oxford University Press 2014
- "When Stones Float and Mud Speaks: Scriptural Authority and Personal Experience in Jīvagosvāmin’s Sarvasaṁvādinī" by Jonathan Edelmann and Satyanarayana Das, Journal of Hindu Studies 2014
- "Contribution of Sri Caitanya to Indian Theology", in: Vraja Vrindavan Vithiyo me Sri Caitanyadeva (Hindi and English), by Amiya Nimai Gauranga Mahaprabhu Mandir, Vrindavan 2015
- "Sanskrit is not Dead" 2017, Proceeding of Svadeshi II Conference
- The Source of All Sources: Śrī Kṛṣṇa as Svayaṁ Bhagavān, Journal of Vaishnava Studies, Fall 2017
