= Haridas Shastri =

Indian Gaudiya Vaisnava scholar and practitioner

Shri Haridas Shastri (1918 – 2013) was an Indian Gaudiya Vaisnava scholar and practitioner. A prolific Sanskrit scholar, he wrote more than a sixty books, including translations from the Sanskrit of several Gauḍīya books and his own commentaries on them. His original works include the highly regarded book, the Vedānta-darśanam bhāgavata bhāṣyopetam, his translation-cum-commentaries of the Sat Sandarbhas, and his transliterations of Śrī-caitanya-bhāgavata, Śrī-caitanya-caritāmṛta and Śrī-caitanya-maṅgala. Jonathan Edelmann at the University of Florida has called Śāstrī "arguably the most prolific and well-educated Gauḍīya Vaiṣṇava “insider” scholar of the twentieth century" and "a voice distinct from the more well known Gaudīya-Maṭha and ISKCON". Among his disciples is the noted Gauḍīya scholar and practitioner, Dr. Satyanarayana Dasa.

== Early life and career ==
Śrī Haridās Śāstrī was born in 1918 in Ropa, West Bengal to Śrīmatī Suśīlā Devī and Śrī Abhayacaraṇa Cattopādhyāya. His childhood name was Phaṇīndra Nāth. In 1933, he journeyed to Mathura, where he lived under the care of Pandita Bābā Śrī Rāma Kṛṣṇadāsaji.

Paṇḍita Bābā chose his only veṣa disciple Śrī Vinod Vihārī Goswāmī as Phaṇīndra Nāth’s teacher. Phaṇīndra received mantra dīkṣā from Śrī Vinod Vihārī Goswāmī and became his disciple, with the name Haridāsa. After a year, Śrī Haridās received bābājī-veṣa dīkṣā from him. He lived with his guru and served him with great devotion. He studied the Gauḍīya Vaiṣṇava works from his guru for several years. Besides studying from his guru, he studied from other renowned scholars of Vrindavan such as Pandita Amolakrama Śāstrī and Dhananjaya Dāsa.

Later, ordered by his guru, Śrī Haridāsa then went to Benares where he studied Indian philosophy for twelve years. He earned nine graduate degrees and three post-graduate degrees covering the six systems of Indian philosophy and theology. He studied under the top scholars of Benares, such as Vāmacharan Śāstrī and Harerāma Śāstrī.

His different degrees are listed in his books (for example,): Kāvya-tīrtha, Vyākaraṇa-tīrtha, Sāṅkhya-tīrtha, Mīmāṁsā-tīrtha, Vedānta-tīrtha, Vaiśeṣika-tīrtha, Navya-nyāya-śāstra, Navya-nyāyācārya, Tarka-tīrtha (pratyakṣa), Tarka-tīrtha (anumāna), Tarka-tīrtha (śabda) and Vaiṣṇava-darśana-tīrtha. Later, he was awarded the title "Vidyaratna" for his unique contribution to Brahma-sutra bhashya.

He established the Śrī Haridāsa Niwāsa āśrama at Kālīya-daha in Vṛndāvana in 1965. In the center of this āśrama was established the first major temple in Vṛndāvana to have deities of Śrī Caitanya Mahāprabhu and Śrī Gadādhara Paṇḍita.

== Paramparā ==
Śrī Haridās Śāstrī is part of the Gadādhara parivāra. The Gadādhara parivāra is a lineage of guru-śiṣya which originated from Śrī Gadādhara Paṇḍita. Śrī Gadādhara Paṇḍita gave dīkṣā to several disciples including Śrī Bhugarbha Goswāmī. Śrī Haridās Śāstrī belongs to Śrī Bhugarbha Goswāmī's line.

== Gadādhara-Gaura Hari Press ==
Śrī Haridās Śāstrī established the Gadādhara-Gaura Hari Press. His purpose was to make the works of Gaudiya Vaisnava acharyas, mainly Jiva Goswami's, which were primarily in Sanskrit, accessible to the public. He translated and published around 60 books in Sanskrit and Hindi. Many of these books contained his own commentaries. He was the first to translate and comment on Jīva Goswāmī’s Sat Sandarbhas in Hindi. He also established a library, Śrī Gaura-Gadādhara Granthāgāram, which is one of the largest libraries in Vrindavan today. Edelmann notes, "many academic scholars of the Gauḍīya Vaiṣṇava tradition have used Haridāsa Śāstrī published editions of the Gosvāmin’s literature".

His Sat Sandarbhas are based on the edition of Purīdās Mahāshay (1895-1958).

== Vedāntadarśanam ==
Śrī Caitanya Mahāprabhu had explained that the Śrīmad Bhāgavatam is the natural commentary of the Vedanta-sūtras. But he had not explained how individual verses of the two scriptures related to each other. Sri Haridas Shastri addressed this key gap in the Gauḍīyā Vaiṣṇava literature, by writing and publishing his book Vedānta-darśanam. This book explains how a verse or verses of the Śrīmad Bhāgavatam comment on a specific Vedanta-sūtra. This work is exceptional in its scholarship, and was honored with an award by the Nāgarī Pracāriṇī Sabhā of Benares.

He was a great lover of cows and had a cowshed within his ashrama. He would personally take care of each cow and had a personal relationship with them. He started his cowshed around 1981 with just two cows and a bull, and by the time he left his body, the cowshed had grown to 250 cows and bulls. To ensure that the services that he started continued in his absence, he established Śrī Haridās Śāstrī Cow Institute with a board of trustees.

== Bibliography ==
=== Books ===
1. Vedānta-darśanam bhāgavata bhāṣyopetam
2. Śrī-sādhanāmṛta-candrikā
3. Śrī-gaura-govindārcana-paddhati
4. Śrī-rādhā-kṛṣṇārcana-dīpikā
5. Śrī-govinda-līlāmṛtam (3 volumes)
6. Aiśvarya-kādambinī
7. Śrī-saṁkalpa-kalpa-druma
8. Catuḥślokī-bhāṣyam & Śrī-kṛṣṇa-bhajanāmṛta
9. Prema-sampuṭa
10. Śrī-bhagavad-bhakti-sāra-samuccaya
11. Braja-rīti-cintāmaṇi
12. Śrī-govinda-vṛndāvanam
13. Śrī-kṛṣṇa-bhakti-ratna-prakāśa
14. Śrī-hari-bhakti-sāra-saṁgraha
15. Dharma-saṁgraha
16. Śrī-caitanya-sūkti-sudhākara
17. Śrī-nāmāmṛta-samudra
18. Sanat-kumāra-saṁhitā
19. Śruti-stuti-vyākhyā
20. Rāsa-prabandha
21. Dina-candrikā
22. Śrī-sādhana-dīpikā
23. Svakīyātva-nirāsa-parakīyātva-nirūpaṇam
24. Śrī-rādhā-rasa-sudhā-nidhi (mūla)
25. Śrī-rādhā-rasa-sudhā-nidhi (sānuvād)
26. Śrī-Gaurāṅga-candrodaya
27. Śrī-caitanya-candrāmṛtam
28. Śrī-brahma-saṁhitā
29. Bhakti-candrikā
30. Prameya-ratnāvalī evaṁ navaratna
31. Vedānta-syamantaka
32. Tattva-sandarbhaḥ
33. Bhagavat-sandarbhaḥ
34. Paramātma-sandarbhaḥ
35. Kṛṣṇa-sandarbhaḥ
36. Bhakti-sandarbhaḥ
37. Prīti-sandarbhaḥ
38. Daśaḥ-ślokī bhāṣyam
39. Bhakti-rasāmṛta-śeṣa
40. Śrī-caitanya-bhāgavata (only hindi transliteration)
41. Śrī-caitanya-caritāmṛta-mahā-kāvyam
42. Śrī-caitanya-maṅgala (only hindi transliteration)
43. Śrī-gaurāṅga-virūdāvalī
44. Śrī-kṛṣṇa-caitanya-caritāmṛta
45. Sat-saṅgam
46. Nitya-kṛtya-prakaraṇam
47. Śrīmad-bhāgavata-prathama-śloka
48. Śrī-gāyatrī-vyākhyā-vivṛtiḥ
49. Śrī-hari-nāmāmṛta-vyākaraṇam
50. Śrī-kṛṣṇa-janma-tithi-vidhiḥ
51. Śrī-hari-bhakti-vilāsaḥ
52. Kāvya-kaustubhaḥ
53. Śrī-caitanya-caritāmṛta (only hindi transliteration)
54. Alaṅkāra-kaustubha
55. Śrī-gaurāṅga-līlāmṛtam
56. Śikṣāṣṭakam
57. Saṅkṣepa-śrī-hari-nāmāmṛta-vyākaraṇam
58. Prayuktākhyāta manjarī
59. Chando kaustubha
60. Hindu-dharma-rahasyam vā sarva-dharma-samanvayaḥ
61. Sāhitya-kaumudī
62. Go-sevā
63. Rāsalīlā
64. Śrī mantra-bhāgavatam
