= Haṃsadūta =

Rūpa Gosvāmin's Haṃsadūta (Hansa-duta, हंसदूत) or Swan Messenger was composed in the early part of the sixteenth century CE. In Haṃsadūta romantic and religious love are combined, to produce a poem that shines with the intensity of love for Krishna, the godhead. It was composed in Bengal by Rūpa Gosvāmin, who was one of the most famous poets of the Gaudiya sampradāya established by his contemporary, Chaitanya. The Gaudiyas were devotees of Krishna.
In the Haṃsadūta Krishna has left Vrindavan for Mathura, abandoning the many cowherd girls who adore him. Chief among them was Rādhā, and she is distraught. Her friend Lalitā meets a swan on the banks of the Yamuna and begs him to take a message to Krishna.
The theme, as of all messenger poems, is viraha, separation in love. Allusions to romance are never far away.
The journey of the swan in the Haṃsadūta is concluded in 35 of its 142 stanzas, as the distance of swan has to cover is fairly short, from Vrindavan to Mathura. Lalitā's message takes up over half the poem, and dwells upon the state of the grief-stricken lover, Rādhā in this case, while praising her sweetheart – though Krishna is chided for forsaking the cowherd girls.
In the Haṃsadūta, Rūpa Gosvāmin uses a number of puns which are ingeniously employed in order to weave the mythology of Krishna into the work.

== English translations ==
The Clay Sanskrit Library has published a translation of Haṃsadūta by Sir James Mallinson as a part of the volume Messenger Poems.
