= Upadesamrta =

The Upadesamrta, or Nectar of Instruction, is an important Gaudiya Vaishnava spiritual text, composed by Rupa Goswami. The Upadesamrta was translated into English in its entirety by A. C. Bhaktivedanta Swami Prabhupada, founder acarya of the International Society for Krishna Consciousness. Prabhupada also gives extensive commentaries on each translated verse within the Upadesamrita.

== Content ==
In the Nectar of Instruction, Prabhupada writes "The Kṛṣṇa consciousness movement is conducted under the supervision of Śrīla Rūpa Gosvāmī. The Gauḍīya Vaiṣṇavas, or Bengali Vaiṣṇavas, are mostly followers of Śrī Caitanya Mahāprabhu, of whom the six Gosvāmīs of Vṛndāvana are direct disciples. Therefore Śrīla Narottama dāsa Ṭhākura has sung:

rūpa-raghunātha-pade ha-ibe ākuti
kabe hāma bujhaba se yugala-pīriti

'When I am eager to understand the literature given by the Gosvāmīs, then I shall be able to understand the transcendental loving affairs of Rādhā and Kṛṣṇa.

All Verses of Upadesamrta {Nector of Instruction} : (Translation by A. C. Bhaktivedanta Swami Prabhupada)

(१)

वाचो वेगं मनसः क्रोधवेगं

जिह्वावेगमुदरोपस्थवेगम्

एतान्वेगान्यो विषहेत धीरः

सर्वामपीमां पृथिवीं स शिष्यात्

Translation:

1) A sober person who can tolerate the urge to speak, the mind's demands, the actions of anger, and the urges of the tongue, belly, and genitals is qualified to make disciples all over the world.

(२)

अत्याहारः प्रयासश्च प्रजल्पो नियमाग्रहः

जनसङ्गश्च लौल्यं च षड्भिर्भक्तिर्विनश्यति

Translation:

2) One's devotional service is spoiled when he becomes too entangled in the following six activities: (1) eating more than necessary or collecting more funds than required; (2) over-endeavoring for mundane things that are very difficult to obtain; (3) talking unnecessarily about mundane subject matters; (4) Practicing the scriptural rules and regulations only for the sake of following them and not for the sake of spiritual advancement, or rejecting the rules and regulations of the scriptures and working independently or whimsically; (5) associating with worldly-minded persons who are not interested in Krsna consciousness; and (6) being greedy for mundane achievements.

(३)

उत्साहान्निश्चयाद्धैर्यात्तत्तत्कर्मप्रवर्तनात्

सङ्गत्यागात्सतो वृत्तेः षड्भिर्भक्तिः प्रसिध्यति

Translation:

3) There are six principles favorable to the execution of pure devotional service: (1) being enthusiastic, (2) endeavoring with confidence, (3) being patient, (4) acting according to regulative principles (such as sravanam kirtanam visnoḥ smaranam [SB 7.5.23] — hearing, chanting and remembering Krsna), (5) abandoning the association of non-devotees, and (6) following in the footsteps of the previous acharyas. These six principles undoubtedly assure the complete success of pure devotional service.

(४)

ददाति प्रतिगृह्नाति गुह्यमाख्याति पृच्छति

भुङ्क्ते भोजयते चैव षड्विधं प्रीतिलक्षणम्

Translation:

4) Offering gifts in charity, accepting charitable gifts, revealing one's mind in confidence, inquiring confidentially, accepting prasada and offering prasada are the six symptoms of love shared by one devotee and another.

(५)

कृष्णेति यस्य गिरि तं मनसाद्रियेत

दीक्षास्ति चेत्प्रणतिभिश्च भजन्तमीशम्

शुश्रूषया भजनविज्ञमनन्यमन्य-

निन्दादिशून्यहृदमीप्सितसङ्गलब्ध्या

Translation:

5) One should mentally honor the devotee who chants the holy name of Lord Krsna, one should offer humble obeisances to the devotee who has undergone spiritual initiation [diksa] and is engaged in worshiping the Deity, and one should associate with and faithfully serve that Pure devotee who is advanced in undeviated devotional service and whose heart is completely devoid of the propensity to criticize others.

(६)

दृष्टैः स्वभावजनितैर्वपुषश्च दोषैर्

न प्राकृतत्वमिह भक्तजनस्य पश्येत्

गङ्गाम्भसां न खलु बुद्बुद्फेनपङ्कैर्

ब्रह्मद्रवत्वमपगच्छति नीरधर्मैः

Translation:

6) Being situated in his original Krsna conscious position, a pure devotee does not identify with the body. Such a devotee should not be seen from a materialistic point of view. Indeed, one should overlook a devotee's having a body born in a low family, a body with a bad complexion, a deformed body, or a diseased or infirm body. According to ordinary vision, such imperfections may seem prominent in the body of a pure devotee, but despite such seeming defects, the body of a pure devotee cannot be polluted. It is exactly like the waters of the Ganges, which sometimes during the rainy season are full of bubbles, foam and mud. The Ganges waters do not become polluted. Those who are advanced in spiritual understanding will bathe in the Ganges without considering the condition of the water.

(७)

स्यात्कृष्णनामचरितादिसिताप्यविद्या-

पित्तोपतप्तरसनस्य न रोचिका नु

किन्त्वादरादनुदिनं खलु सैव जुष्टा

स्वाद्वी क्रमाद्भवति तद्गदमूलहन्त्री

Translation:

7) The holy name, character, pastimes and activities of Krsna are all transcendentally sweet like sugar candy. Although the tongue of one afflicted by the jaundice of avidya [ignorance] cannot taste anything sweet, it is wonderful that simply by carefully chanting these sweet names every day, a natural relish awakens within his tongue, and his disease is gradually destroyed at the root.

(८)

तन्नामरूपचरितादिसुकीर्तनानु-

स्मृत्योः क्रमेण रसनामनसी नियोज्य

तिष्ठन्व्रजे तदनुरागिजनानुगामी

कालं नयेदखिलमित्युपदेशसारम्

Translation:

8) The essence of all advice is that one should utilize one's full time — twenty-four hours a day — in nicely chanting and remembering the Lord's divine name, transcendental form, qualities and eternal pastimes, thereby gradually engaging one's tongue and mind. In this way one should reside in Vraja [Goloka Vṛndavana dhama] and serve Krsna under the guidance of devotees. One should follow in the footsteps of the Lord's beloved devotees, who are deeply attached to His devotional service.

(९)

वैकुण्ठाज्जनितो वरा मधुपुरी तत्रापि रासोत्सवाद्

वृन्दारण्यमुदारपाणिरमणात्तत्रापि गोवर्धनः

राधाकुण्ड्मिहापि गोकुलपतेः प्रेमामृताप्लवनात्

कुर्यादस्य विराजतो गिरितटे सेवां विवेकी न्कः

Translation:

9) The holy place known as Mathura is spiritually superior to Vaikuntha, the transcendental world, because the Lord appeared there. Superior to Mathura-Puri is the transcendental forest of Vṛndavana because of Krsna's rasa-lila pastimes. And superior to the forest of Vṛndavana is Govardhana Hill, for it was raised by the divine hand of Sri Krsna and was the site of His various loving pastimes. And, above all, the superexcellent Sri Radha-kunda stands supreme, for it is overflooded with the ambrosial nectarean prema of the Lord of Gokula, Sri Krsna. Where, then, is that intelligent Person who is unwilling to serve this divine Radha-kunda, which is situated at the foot of Govardhana Hill?

(१०)

कर्मिभ्यः परितो हरेः प्रियतया व्यक्तिं ययुर्ज्ञानिनस्

तेभ्यो ज्ञानविमुक्तभक्तिपरमाः प्रेमैकनिष्ठास्ततः

तेभ्यस्ताः पशुपालपङ्कजदृशस्ताभ्योऽपि सा राधिका

प्रेष्ठा तद्वदियं तदीयसरसी तां नाश्रयेत्कः कृती

Translation:

10) In the sastra it is said that of all types of fruitive workers, he who is advanced in knowledge of the higher values of life is favored by the Supreme Lord Hari. Out of many such people who are advanced in knowledge [jnanis], one who is practically liberated by virtue of his knowledge may take to devotional service. He is superior to the others. However, one who has actually attained prema, pure love of Krsna, is superior to him. The gopis are exalted above all the advanced devotees because they are always totally dependent upon Sri Krsna, the transcendental cowherd boy. Among the gopis, Srimati Radharani is the most dear to Krsna. Her kunda [lake] is as profoundly dear to Lord Krsna as this most beloved of the gopis. Who, then, will not reside at Radha-kunda and, in a spiritual body surcharged with ecstatic devotional feelings [aprakṛtabhava], render loving service to the divine couple Sri Sri Radha-Govinda, who perform Their astakaliya-lila, Their eternal eightfold daily pastimes. Indeed, those who execute devotional service on the banks of Radha-kunda are the most fortunate people in the universe.

(११)

कृष्णस्योच्चैः प्रणयवसतिः प्रेयसीभ्योऽपि राधा

कुण्डं चास्या मुनिभिरभितस्तादृगेव व्यधायि

यत्प्रेष्ठैरप्यलमसुलभं किं पुनर्भक्तिभाजां

तत्प्रेमेदं सकृदपि सरः स्नातुराविष्करोति

Translation:

11) Of the many objects of favored delight and of all the lovable damsels of Vrajabhūmi, Srimati Radharani is certainly the most treasured object of Krsna's love. And, in every respect, Her divine kunda is described by great sages as similarly dear to Him. Undoubtedly Radha-kunda is very rarely attained even by the great devotees; therefore it is even more difficult for ordinary devotees to attain. If one simply bathes once within those holy waters, one's pure love of Krsna is fully aroused."
