= Sambandha =

Sanskrit term meaning "relationship"

The word "sambandha" is a Sanskrit term meaning "relationship". It is a key concept in Sanskrit grammar, and in Gaudiya Vaishnava theology. In the context of this tradition of Hinduism, sambandha-jnana means knowledge of the relationship between Almighty God Krishna, Shakti, jivas, and the world. Accordingly, sambandha-jnana includes knowledge of the three tattvas or truths: Krishna-tattva, Shakti-tattva and jiva-tattva.

== Theology ==
Sambandha in Gaudiya Vaishnavism is the relationship between Krishna, a jiva, and the material world. All jivas are eternally and inextricably linked with Krishna, who is the true object of all relations. The basic relationship between Krishna and a jiva is the attitude of a servant. By sadhana, which includes a repetition of Names of Lord Krishna (kirtan and japa), people can be freed from Maya and awakens in their heart their attachment as a servant of Krishna.

Vedic literature refers to the eternal relationship of a jiva with Krishna. Understanding of the relationship, and any subsequent action on the basis of this understanding, is called "abhidheya". Reaching Prema, or pure love of Krishna, and returning to the spiritual world in the company of Krishna and his associates, is the ultimate goal of life, which is called "prayojana".

In the Gaudiya Vaishnava tradition Sanatana Goswami is considered to be the Acharya of sambandha-jnana. The deity of Madan Mohan, installed by Sanatana in Vrindavan, is associated with sambandha. It is believed that he helps to overcome the influence of material desires and to focus on devotional service to Krishna.
