= Sanatana Goswami =

Principal follower of Chaitanya Mahaprabhu (1488–1558)

Sanatana Goswami (Sanskrit: सनातन गोस्वामी, IAST: Sanātana Gosvāmī; Bengali: সনাতন গোস্বামী; 1488–1558) was a principal follower of Chaitanya Mahaprabhu. Sanatana wrote a number of works in the bhakti tradition of Gaudiya Vaishnavism and was the senior most of the influential Six Goswamis of Vrindavan, among whom was his brother Rupa Goswami.

== Biography ==
=== Genealogy ===
His family lineage can be traced to Indian State of Karnataka and Naihati in the district of North 24 Parganas in present-day West Bengal, India. The former generations according to Bhakti-ratnakara:

Sarvajna Jagatguru was a known brahmana, scholar in all Vedas, respected Yajur-vedi of the Baradvaja caste, and king of Karnataka in South India, adored by all other contemporary kings. Sarvajna's son, Aniruddha, was spirited, famous, a proficient scholar of the Vedas, and a favorite of the reigning kings at the time. Aniruddha's sons, Rupesvara (eldest) and Harihara, were respected due to their virtuous qualities. Rupesvara was known as a scholar of the scriptures, while Harihara became a master in the art and science of weapons. Both brothers inherited the administration of the state after their father died, but Harihara soon snatched all the power, causing Rupesvara and his wife to travel to Paulastha-desa, where Sikharesvara befriended him and convinced him to settle there.

Rupesvara's son, Padmanabha learned the four Vedas making him famous. He had impeccable character and was absorbed in love of Jagannatha. He left Sikharabhumi and settled on the bank of the Ganges in the village Navahatta (present-day Naihati, West Bengal, India), where he had eighteen daughters and five sons. His five sons were Purusottama (eldest), Jagannatha, Narayana, Murari, and Mukunda (youngest), where Purusottama and Mukunda were the best in experience and character. Mukunda's son, Kumara, was a brahmana and virtuous. He privately engaged in oblations and purificatory penances. Becoming disturbed by family difficulties, he left the village Navahatta with his followers and settled in the village Bakla Chandradvipa in East Bengal (now Bangladesh). He built a house in the village Fateyabad in Jessore for the convenience of communications with devotees and traveling Vaishnavas.

Among Kumara's many sons, Sanatana (eldest), Rupa (middle), and Vallabha (youngest) were the life of the Vaishnava community and great devotees, all three becoming known for their academic capacities and devotion, and eventually settling in the village Ramakeli in Gauda (present-day Maldah, West Bengal). The brothers were inspired by Chaitanya Mahaprabhu, who lived in Nadia (a district of present-day West Bengal, India) at the time. Sanatana and Rupa resigned from their ministerial (royal) posts and retired to help Chaitanya in his mission, eventually relocating to Vrindavana. Vallabha, who was happy in service, was initiated by Chaitanya and given the name Anupama, and was known for his stoicism and neutrality in his detachment from worldly affairs.

Alternatively, it is said that his ancestors migrated from Karnataka to Gauda and lived in the village Ramkeli, near Gauda for generations.

=== Birth ===
Sanatana was born around 1488 CE as the son of Mukunda, the private secretary of the Sultan of Gauda, Jalaluddin Fateh Shah (ruled 1481–1487). Sanatana was the eldest son of Mukunda, and his younger brothers were Rupa and Vallabha (Anupama). Gaudia Vaishnavism scholar Bhaktivinoda Thakur and historian Satishchandra Mitra assert Sanatan was born in Jessore, East Bengal (now Bangladesh). Others opine that he was born in Navahatta (present-day Naihati, West Bengal, India) while others believe that he was born in Bakla Chandradvipa or in Fateyabad Pargana, Some biographers believe that he was born in Ramakeli in the district of Maldah, West Bengal.

=== Early life ===
Sanatana and his brothers studied Nyaya (rhetoric) and Vedanta from the logician Vasudeva Sarvabhauma Bhattacharya. They also studied under Sarvabhauma's brother, Madhusudana Vidyavacaspati, from whom Sanatana took initiation in his childhood.

On the death of his father, Sanatana was forced to take up the post of Sakara Mallik (treasurer) to the new ruler of Bengal, Alauddin Hussein Shah (ruled 1493–1519), while his brother Rupa was given the post of Dabir-i-khas (private secretary).

=== First meeting with Chaitanya Mahaprabhu ===
Sanatana and his brothers were residents of Ramakeli (in present-day Maldah, West Bengal) and it was here, in 1514 CE, that they met Chaitanya Mahaprabhu for the first time beneath kadamba and tamäl trees when Mahaprabhu was travelling through Gauda on his way to Vrindavan. The meeting changed their lives. After meeting them, Chaitanya gave them the names Rupa, Sanatana and Anupama. Sanatana advised Mahaprabhu,

Dear Lord, you are going to Vrindavana with hundreds and thousands of people following You, and this is not a fitting way to go on a pilgrimage.

— Chaitanya Charitamrita 2.1.224

As a result of this advice, Mahaprabhu put off going to Vrindavan and turned back after going a little further, as far as Kanair Natshala. Due to this meeting, the brothers decided to renounce the world and join Chaitanya and his entourage. Rupa resigned from his post, but Sanatana's resignation was refused by the Sultan. Sanatana stopped coming to court and feigned sickness. But when the Sultan sent his personal physicians to treat Sanatana they returned and reported that Sanatana was in perfectly good health. The Sultan personally visited Sanatana and tried to convince him to continue to render his governmental duties and accompany him on a military campaign against the neighbouring state of Odisha. Upon Sanatana's refusal, Hussein Shah had him thrown into prison.

While in prison, Sanatana received a letter from his brother Rupa telling him that Chaitanya Mahaprabhu had left Puri to go to Vrindavan and that Rupa and Anupama had decided to meet him there. Sanatana managed to bribe the jailer with money Rupa had sent him for emergencies. Sanatana then crossed the Ganges River and made his way towards Vrindavan.

=== Chaitanya Mahaprabhu in Varanasi ===
As Sanatana made his way to Vrindavan he learned that Chaitanya Mahaprabhu had already left Vrindavan and was then residing in Varanasi. There Sanatana met Chaitanya, who imparted to him instructions pertaining to sambandha-jnana (knowledge of the self and one's relationship with God). Chaitanya taught that the constitutional identity of each soul is to be an eternal servant of God. Chaitanya explained his teachings to Sanatana by summarizing them in three categories: sambandha (one's relationship with Godhead), abhidheya (the method for reviving that relationship), and prayojana (the ultimate attainment of the supreme goal of life). After instructing Sanatana in the sambandha aspect of Gaudiya Vaishnava theology, Chaitanya instructed him to go to Vrindavan, where Sanatana visited the sites connected to Krishna's pastimes.

When Sanatana later went to Puri and met Chaitanya once more, Chaitanya gave him four direct instructions:

1. To write books teaching Bhakti yoga, the process of devotion to Krishna
2. To discover and excavate the places in Vrindavan where Krishna had his pastimes
3. To establish the service of the deity (murthis) of Krishna in Vrindavan
4. To compile a book establishing the proper behavior for devotees of Krishna in order to create the foundations of a Vaishnava society.

=== Vrindavan ===
Sanatana Goswami returned to Vrindavan, where he located various lost holy places. He also established the worship of the deity of Madana-mohana. Soon after Sanatana discovered the deity, a rich officer in the Moghul army named Krishna Dasa Kapura built a temple for Madana-mohan. This later became one of the seven principal temples of Vrindavan. The temple is called Radha Madan Mohan Temple.

Sanatana Goswami disappeared in the year 1558 CE. His samādhi (tomb) is located next to the Madana-mohana temple. In Gaudiya Vaishnava theology, Sanatana Goswami is considered to be the incarnation of Rati Manjari or Lavanga Manjari.

== Works ==
Sanatana Goswami wrote four books in Sanskrit on Gaudiya Vaishnava philosophy:

- Brihat-bhagavtamrita ("The Great Nectar of the Lord’s Devotees")

This work of 2,500 verses is divided into two parts. The first section explains the ontological hierarchy of the devotees of Krishna. The second section deals with the soul's journey to the eternal realm of Krishna. Narrated as stories, both sections explain many aspects of Gaudiya Vaishnava philosophy. Sanatana also wrote for this book his own commentary, called the Dig-darshini.

- Hari-bhakti-vilasa ("Performance of Devotion to Hari")

This book was a joint work between Sanatana Goswami and Gopala Bhatta Goswami. Compiled on the order of Chaitanya Mahaprabhu, the book deals with the rituals and conduct of Gaudiya Vaisnavas. Sanatana also wrote an auto-commentary on Hari-bhakti Vilasa.

- Krishna-lila-stava ("Glorification of the Pastimes of Krishna")

Krishna-lila-stava consists of 432 verses tracing Krishna's pastimes as told in the Bhagavata Purana, from the beginning of the 10th Canto up through the vanquishing of Kamsa. Krishna-lila-stava is also sometimes referred to as the Dasama-charita.

- Brihad Vaishnava Toshani ("That which brings Great Joy to the Devotees of Krishna")

The Brihad Vaishnava Toshani is Sanatana's extensive commentary on the Tenth Canto of the Bhagavata Purana. This commentary is also known as the Dasama-tipanni.

== See also ==
- Govardhan hill
- Gopal
- Hare Krishna
- Krishnology
- Radha Madan Mohan Temple, Vrindavan
- Rup Sanatan

== Bibliography ==
- Swami, Bhānu. Śrī Bṛhad-bhāgavatāmṛta. Includes the full translation of the Dig-darśinī commentary, 2018.
- Dasa, Gopiparanadhana. Śrī Bṛhad-bhāgavatāmṛta of Śrīla Sanātana Goswāmī. Includes the Devanagari text, a roman transliteration, word-for-word meanings, English translation, and a summary of the Dig-darśinī commentary. Los Angeles: The Bhaktivedanta Book Trust, 2002. 3 volumes: ISBN 0-89213-348-1.
- Dasa, Gopiparanadhana. Śrī Kṛṣņa-līlā-stava of Śrīla Sanātana Goswāmī. Includes the Devanagari text, a roman transliteration, word-for-word meanings, English translation, and commentary. Los Angeles: The Bhaktivedanta Book Trust, 2007. ISBN 978-1-84599-056-5.
- Tirtha, Swami B.B., Sri Caitanya and His Associates, 2002, Mandala Publishing, San Francisco. ISBN 1-886069-28-X
- Mahayogi, Swami B.V., Lives of the Saints, translated from Gaura Parsada Citravali, unpublished work.
- Bhakti-ratnakara (Bengali), Narahari Chakravarti, Pub. By Gaudiya Mission, Kolkata, 1986.
- Narayana Goswami Maharaja, Sri Srimad Bhaktivedanta; 'Sri Brihad Bhagavatamrita' of Srila Sanatana Goswami ISBN 978-1-935428-32-9
