= Abhidheya =

The word "abhidhéya" is a Sanskrit term which, along with sambandham and prayojana, is one of the three fundamental concepts of Gaudiya Vaishnavism. It denotes a means of achieving the ultimate goal, dedicated ministry in the stage of practice Sadhana-Bhakti. Abhidheya is what a person must develop to achieve the ultimate goal—prem, or pure love of Krishna, which is considered the highest achievement of the prayojana.

The concepts sambandha, abhidheya and prayojana are explained in the works of theologians such as Rupa Goswami and Raghunatha dasa Goswami. Abhidheya is a Sadhana, a spiritual practice performed by a man after he realized the sambandhu - the original relationship with Krishna. Abhideya is an activity aimed at meeting Krishna, pure, selfless service to Krishna, which is a means of understanding the eternal relationship of love between Krishna and the smallest jiva.

The eternal relationship jiva with Krishna is described in Vedic literature. Information on these relationships is called sambandha. Understanding these relationships and the subsequent effect on the basis of this understanding is called Abhidheya. Reaching Prem, or pure love of Krishna and returning to the spiritual world, the society of Krishna and its satellites, is the ultimate goal of life, which is called prayojana.
