= Prayojana =

Purushartha or goal of life in Hinduism

The word "prayojana" is a Sanskrit term which denotes the ultimate goal or object of attainment. Along with sambandha and abhidheya, prayojana is one of the three fundamental concepts in Gaudiya Vaishnava theology, where it is used to describe the ultimate goal of life - Prema, or pure love of Krishna.

== Literature ==
- Rosen, Steven J. (1994), Vaisnavism: Contemporary Scholars Discuss the Gaudiya Tradition, Motilal Banarsidass Publ., ISBN 81-208-1235-2
