= Rupa Goswami =

Indian guru, poet and philosopher of the Gaudiya Vaishnava tradition (1489–1564)

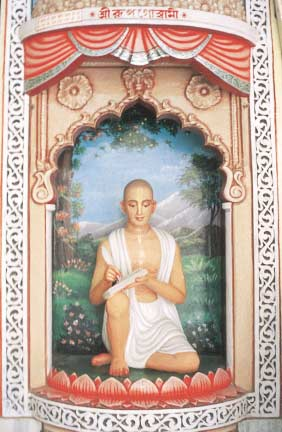
Rupa Goswami

Rupa Goswami (Sanskrit: रूप गोस्वामी, Bengali: রূপ গোস্বামী, IAST: Rūpa Gosvāmī; 1489–1564) was a devotional teacher (guru), poet, and philosopher of the Gaudiya Vaishnava tradition. With his brother Sanatana Goswami, he is considered the most senior of the Six Goswamis of Vrindavan associated with Chaitanya Mahaprabhu, mixed avatar of Krishna himself and Srimati Rādhārani in Kali Yuga.

== Biography ==
Rūpa Gosvāmī was born in Fateyabad, Bengal in the late 15th century into family of Karnataka origin. He was the younger brother of Sanātana Gosvāmī and the elder brother of Anupama. The birth names of all three brothers are Santosha, Amara and Vallabha. The three brothers moved to Ramakeli where Sanātana and Rūpa worked in the government of Sulṭān Ḥusayn Šāh under the titles of Sākar Mallik and Dabir Khās.

Sākar Mallik and Dabir Khās began a correspondence with Kr̥ṣṇa Caitanya while working at the court, and when the latter was passing by Ramakeli on the way to Vrindavan the brothers rushed to meet him. The renounced their high statuses and Caitanya initiated them into asceticism under the names Sanātana Gosvāmī, Rūpa Gosvāmī, and Vallabha. On his return journey from Vraja, Caitanya ordered Sanātana and Rūpa to go to Vrindavan, study the devotional scriptures, recover lost religious sites and establish their greatness.

The brothers arrived in a woody and uninhabited Vrindavan, where they set upon the task of rediscovering lost sacred sites in Braj, via studying the Puranic geography of Kr̥ṣṇa's life as well as developing their own stories.

Caitanya later sent more devotees to Vrindavan, which lead to the formation of the Six Goswamis of Vrindavan, who created an extensive Sanskrit literature on Gauḍīya subjects of Kr̥ṣṇa, theology, ritual practice, grammar, and literary theory; the group was led by the two brothers.

Rūpa is associated with two sites, one east of Nandīśvara and Sevākuñj in Vrindavan. He also discovered the mūrti of Govindadeva. After his death, his possessions went to his nephew and disciple Jīva Gosvāmī (son of Anupama/Vallabha).

== Works ==
- Bhakti-rasāmṛta-sindhu (The Ocean of Nectar of Divine Love): Bhakti-rasāmṛta-sindhu can be considered to be one of the most important books in Gaudiya Vaishnavism. It elaborately describes gradations of bhakti from its lowest stage of sraddha (faith) up to its highest stage of maha-bhava (ultimate ecstasy in love of Godhead).
- Ujjvala-nilamani (The Sapphire of Divine Love): This work exclusively explains the conception of madhurya-rasa (divine conjugal love). Ujjvala-nilamani is considered to be a sequel to the Bhakti-rasamrta-sindhu.
- Laghu-bhagavatamrta (A Summary of Nectar about Godhead): It is a summary of Sanatana Goswami's book Brhat-bhagavatamrta. It begins by explaining the intrinsic nature of Krishna and his incarnations and subsequently deals with devotees of Krishna.
- Vidagdhamadhava (1524) & Lalitamadhava (1529): Rupa originally began to write these two dramas as one in 1516 but he completed them as two separate plays in Vikram Samvat 1581 (1524) and Saka era 1451 (1529) respectively. It is said that Rupa had a vision of Satyabhama, one of Krishna's queens in Dvaraka, who told him to divide the book into two separate dramas. Thus, Lalitamadhava deals with Krishna's pastimes in Dvaraka, and Vidagdhamadhava narrates Krishna's pastimes in Vrindavana.
- Stavamala (The Flower Garland of Prayers): This is a compilation of short works, some of which are often published as separate books.
- Danakelikaumudi (The Lotus-like Tax-collecting Pastimes) (1549): This Bhāṇikā (one-act play) was written in Saka era 1471 (1549) and narrates the danakeli (tax-collecting pastime) between Krishna and the Gopis of Vrindavana.
- Sri Radha-krsna-ganoddesa-dipika (A Lamp to See the Associates of Radha-Krsna) (1550): In this book, Rupa Goswami lists the associates of Radha and Krishna and describes their characteristics.
- Mathura-mahatmya (The Glories of Mathura): This book tells the glories of Mathura, in the form of a conversation between Varaha (the boar incarnation of Vishnu) and the Earth Goddess. Rupa Goswami explains various processes of devotional service by quoting statements from various Hindu scriptures and establishes that Mathura vanquishes all one's sinful reactions and awards piety and liberation.
- Uddhava-sandesa (News of Uddhava): In this work, Rupa Goswami narrates the story from the Bhagavata Purana of Krishna requesting his friend Uddhava to go to Vrindavana and pacify his friends and relations by reminding them of their pastimes with him.
- Hamsa-dutam (The Swan Messenger): This text tells the story how Lalita, the confident of Radha, sends a messenger in the form of a swan to Krishna in Dwaraka.
- Sri Krsna-janma-tithi-vidhi: This short work is a paddhati (manual on ritual worship) explaining the process of worshiping the deity of Krishna during the festival of Janmastami, the birthday of Krishna celebrated by Vaishnavas in August/September.
- Nataka-candrika (The Illuminating Moon of Dramatics) This book explains the rules of Gaudiya Vaisnava dramaturgy.
- Upadesamrta (The Nectar of Instruction): This short work contains eleven verses of instructions to aspirants on the path of devotion to Krishna. The Upadesamrta was originally a part of the Stavamala.

== See also ==
- Hare Krishna
- Nityananda
- Vaishnava Theology
- Krishnology
- Rup Sanatan

== Bibliography ==
- Tirtha, Swami B.B., Sri Caitanya and His Associates, 2002, Mandala Publishing, San Francisco. ISBN 1-886069-28-X
- Mahayogi, Swami B.V., Lives of the Saints, translated from Gaura Parsada Caritavali, unpublished work.
- Gaudiya Vaisnava Abhidhana (Bengali), Compiled by Haridasa Dasa, Haribol Kutir, Navadvipa, W. Bengal, 1957.
- Bhaktivedanta Swami Prabhupada, A.C., The Nectar of Devotion, 1970, Los Angeles: The Bhaktivedanta Book Trust. (A summary study of Bhakti-rasamrita-sindhu.)
- Swami, Dhanurdhara, Waves of Devotion, 2000, Bhagavat Books ISBN 0-9703581-0-5. (A study guide to The Nectar of Devotion.)
