= Bhaktisvarupa Damodar Swami =

Indian spiritual leader (1937–2006)

Sripada Bhaktisvarupa Damodara Swami
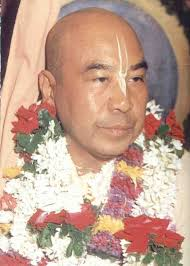
- Title: Guru; Sannyasi

Personal life
- Born: 9 December 1937 Toubul, Manipur, British India
- Died: 2 October 2006 (aged 68) Calcutta, India
- Other name: Thoudam Damodar Singh
- Website: bhaktiswarupadamodara.com

Religious life
- Religion: Hinduism
- Denomination: Gaudiya Vaishnavism
- Order: Sannyasa
- Philosophy: Achintya Bheda Abheda
- Lineage: Gaudiya-Sarasvata Sampradaya
- Initiation: Diksa–1971, Sannyasa–1980

Religious career
- Based in: Manipur
- Post: ISKCON guru, sannyasi, member of the Governing Body Commission, founding director of the Bhaktivedanta Institute
- Period in office: 1980–2006

Bengali name
- Bengali: ভক্তিস্বরূপ দামোদর স্বামী

Sanskrit name
- Sanskrit: भक्तिस्वरूप दामोदर स्वामी

Academic background
- Education: Gauhati University; University of Calcutta; Canisius College; University of California, Irvine (Ph.D.)

Academic work
- Discipline: Chemistry; Philosophy; Theology
- Main interests: Physical organic chemistry; Vedanta; relationship between religion and science

Bhaktisvarupa Damodara Swami (IAST: Bhaktisvarūpa Dāmodara Svāmī; 9 December 1937 – 2 October 2006), also known as Dr. Thoudam Damodara Singh and by the honorific Sripada (Śrīpāda), was an Indian spiritual leader, chemist, writer about religion and science, and poet. In 1971 he received spiritual initiation from A. C. Bhaktivedanta Swami Prabhupada. A few years later he became one of the religious leaders of the International Society for Krishna Consciousness (also known as the Hare Krishna Movement).

For more than thirty years he was the international director of the Bhaktivedanta Institute which promotes the study of the relationship between religion and science (Vedanta). Srila Bhaktisvarupa Damodara Swami Maharaja was a pioneer in "advancing the dialogue on synthesis of science and spirituality throughout the world". He was a co-founder and regional director of United Religions Initiative, a member of Metanexus Institute, founding rector of University of Bhagavata Culture (2000) in the State of Manipur (India) and founding member of the World Vaisnava Association. He authored and edited several books and organised a number of significant conferences and world congresses around the world, where a number of prominent scientists and religious leaders including several Nobel Laureates participated. He was the Editor-in-chief of the Journal of the Bhaktivedanta Institute entitled, Savijnanam: Scientific Exploration for a Spiritual Paradigm.

== Biography ==
=== Early life ===
Thoudam Damodar was born in Toubul, part of the Bishnupur district, Manipur, India, on 9 December 1937 to Sri Thoudam Yogendra Singh and Srimati Kanyahanbi Devi. During World War II on 10 May 1942, the Japanese began bombing Imphal, the Capital of Manipur. Yogendra Singh took his family to shelter in a barrack on the banks of the Yangoi river. In 1944, Yogendra died of typhoid. The war eventually came to end, his uncle Thoudam Ibomcha Singh struggled through tough times to support him and shortly thereafter Thoudam Damodar was separated from his mother and younger sister. His elder sister Srimati Ahanbi Devi began to look after him. As a young boy, he learned how to till the land left by his father to help maintain himself and his sister. In 1949, his sister got married and he was left alone. Not wanting to burden anyone, he used to cultivate paddy for his livelihood. Living through hardships, Thoudam Damodar planned to give up schooling. Seeing his adversity, Sri Thokchom Yadav Singh, his primary school teacher, approached his colleague Sri Thoudam Kerani Singh and requested to help Thoudam Damodar. Sri Thoudam Kerani Singh agreed, and Thoudam Damodar moved into Sri Kerani's home.

=== Education ===
Thoudam Damodar received his BSc with honours from Gauhati University in 1961, his Master of Technology degree with honours from the University of Calcutta in 1964, his MSc in chemistry from Canisius College, New York in 1969, and in 1974 completed his PhD in physical organic chemistry at the University of California, Irvine. Since then he has been involved in dialogues with prominent scientists and religious leaders such as the Dalai Lama in the quest for a scientific understanding of the world through the vedantic paradigm.

=== Spiritual service to ISKCON ===
Thoudam Damodar Singh, then as a student at the University of California, Irvine had a very good friend in Ray Ramananda Dasa, who became a student of Bhaktivedanta Swami Prabhupada. Ray Ramananda Dasa inspired T D Singh to meet Swami Prabhupada. After coming into contact with Swami Prabhupada and students of the International Society for Krishna Consciousness, Thoudam Damodar received spiritual initiation from him at the Sri Radha Krishna Temple in Los Angeles, on 30 June 1971, and was given the name Svarupa Damodar Das (Svarūpa Dāmodara dāsa). He studied the philosophy and practice of Vaishnavism for the following 8 years under the guidance of his spiritual master. Swami Prabhupada appointed Svarupa Damodar das as International Director of the Bhaktivedanta Institute in 1974 and a member of Governing Body Commission in March 1977. In September 1979 he took sannyasa from Kirtanananda Swami at New Vrindaban during the dedication of Prabhupada's Palace of Gold. In 1982 he became an initiating spiritual master and began to accept disciples. During his life, he provided a spiritual guidance to over a thousand of his disciples around the world. He is well known as Srila Bhaktisvarupa Damodara Goswami Maharaja (also known as Srila Sripad Maharaja and Dr. T.D. Singh).

=== Bhaktivedanta Institute – A Mission Transforming Material Science into Spiritual Science ===
On Srila Sripad Maharaja's 75th divine appearance day, one of his scientist disciple Bhakti Niskama Shanta Swami, Ph.D. wrote a summary of the services of Srila Sripad Maharaja under the banner of Bhaktivedanta Institute. In the honor of Srila Sripad Maharaja his scientist disciples are organizing an annual international conference series "Is Science Able to Explain the Scientist? (Science and Scientist)" under the guidance of Sripad Bhakti Madhava Puri Maharaja, Ph.D. (Serving Director, Bhakti Vedanta Institute, Princeton, NJ, USA).

=== Science and Vedanta ===
Bhaktisvarupa Damodara Swami has contributed many papers in the Journal of the American Chemical Society and the Journal of Organic Chemistry in the field of fast proton transfer kinetics in model biological systems using stopped-flow technique and NMR spectroscopy. He also worked on gas phase reaction mechanisms using Ion Cyclotron Resonance (ICR) spectroscopy.

For more than thirty years he was the international director of the Bhaktivedanta Institute which promotes the study of the relationship between science and Vedanta. Srila Bhaktisvarupa Damodara Goswami Maharaja was a pioneer in "advancing the dialogue on synthesis of science and spirituality throughout the world". He was a co-founder and regional director of United Religions Initiative, a member of Metanexus Institute and founding member of the World Vaisnava Association. He authored and edited several books and organised several International conferences on science and religion, where a number of prominent scientists and religious leaders including several Nobel Laureates participated: First and Second World Congress for the Synthesis of Science and Religion (1986 and 1997), First International Conference on the Study of Consciousness within Science (1990), and "Second International Congress on Life and its Origin: Exploration from Science and Various Spiritual and Religious Traditions" (2004, Rome, Italy). For these conferences a group of internationally acclaimed scholars from various disciplines were invited to talk about "the present status of science and religion, the history of discord between them, and the potential benefits of their reconciliation".

From 1992 to 2006 he served as the president of Vedanta and Science Educational Research Foundation and worked to interface Science and Vedanta, the essence of Hindu Religious traditions. He felt that the universal principles contained in the Vedanta can make a significant contribution in Science and Spirituality. He launched The Journal of the Bhaktivedanta Institute, "Savijnanam", aimed at "Scientific Exploration for a Spiritual Paradigm" and was its Editor-in-Chief.

In 2000, Srila Bhaktisvarupa Damodara Goswami Maharaja's interest in science and spirituality has led him to set up the University of Bhagavata Culture in Imphal, Manipur). The purpose of the university is to "promote the universal scientific and philosophical relevance of the teachings of Bhagavad Gita, Srimad Bhagavatam, Vedanta and other Vedic literatures within the framework of modern cultural and educational milieu for the welfare of humanity."

=== Cultural projects ===
Srila Bhaktisvarupa Damodara Goswami Maharaja started a network of schools in Northeastern India where more than 4000 students receive education centred on Vaishnava spiritual values.

In 1989 he founded "Ranganiketan Manipuri Cultural Arts Troupe" which has approximately 600 performances at over 300 venues in over 15 countries. Ranganiketan (literally "House of Colorful Arts") is a group of more than twenty dancers, musicians, singers, martial artists, choreographers and craft artisans. Some of them are gurus in their own respective fields of art. Their performances both at home and abroad, received acclaim and awards. While at home in Manipur, they often perform at various religious and cultural functions. They are not paid a salary, but live from donations that are offered to them for their artistic contributions.

== Works ==
- Singh, Thoudam Damodara (1974), Base Catalysis and Activation Parameters of the Aminolysis and Methanolysis of P-nitrophenyl Trifluoroacetate in Aprotic Solvents, Irvine: University of California
- Singh, Thoudam Damodara; Thompson, Richard L. (1977), What is Matter and what is Life?, Bhaktivedanta Institute
- Bhaktisvarupa, Damodara Swami (1980), Scientific Basis of Krsna Consciousness, Bhaktivedanta Book Trust
- Bhaktisvarupa, Damodara Swami (1986), Consciousness the Missing Link, Bhaktivedanta Book Trust, ISBN 0-89213-108-X
- Singh, Thoudam Damodara; Gomatam, Ravi A. (1988), Synthesis of Science and Religion: Critical Essays and Dialogues, Bhaktivedanta Institute, ISBN 0-941525-01-5
- Bhaktisvarupa, Damodara Swami (1990), Seeking the essence: an investigation into the search for the absolute: a comparative analysis of the primary philosophical and religious conceptions of East and West, Associated Pub. Co., ISBN 81-85211-24-8
- Singh, Thoudam Damodara; Anderson, Greg (1997), Life: Its Nature and Origin: Chemical Evolution Versus a Consciousness-based Paradigm, Bhaktivedanta Institute, ISBN 0-941525-11-2
- Singh, Thoudam Damodara; Bandyopadhyay, Samaresh (2001), Thoughts on Synthesis of Science And Religion: Srila Prabhupada Birth Centenary Volume, Bhaktivedanta Institute, ISBN 81-901369-0-9
- Bhaktisvarupa, Damodara Swami (2004), Life and Origin of the Universe, Bhaktivedanta Institute, ISBN 81-901369-3-3
- Singh, Thoudam Damodara (2004), Seven Nobel Laureates on Science and Spirituality, Bhaktivedanta Institute, ISBN 81-901369-2-5
- Singh, Thoudam Damodara; Penrose, Roger (2005), Science, Spirituality, and the Nature of Reality: A Discussion Between Roger Penrose and T. D. Singh, Bhaktivedanta Institute, ISBN 81-901369-7-6
- Singh, Thoudam Damodara (2005), Life and Spiritual Evolution, Bhaktivedanta Institute, ISBN 81-901369-6-8
- Singh, Thoudam Damodara (2005), Towards a Culture of Harmony and Peace, Delhi Peace Summit, ISBN 81-901369-4-1
- Singh, Thoudam Damodara (2005), Essays on Science and Religion, Bhaktivedanta Institute, ISBN 81-901369-8-4
- Singh, Thoudam Damodara; Behe, Michael J. (2005), God, Intelligent Design and Fine-Tuning. A Dialogue between Dr. T. D. Singh and Prof. Michael J. Behe, Bhaktivedanta Institute, ISBN 81-89635-01-8
- Bhaktisvarupa, Damodara Swami (2006), Reality of God's Existence, Bhaktivedanta Institute, ISBN 81-89635-05-0
- Singh, Thoudam Damodara; Townes, Charles; Phillips, William (2006), God is a Person. Reflections of Two Nobel Laureates: Open Dialogues with Dr. T. D. Singh, Bhaktivedanta Institute, ISBN 81-89635-03-4
- Singh, Thoudam Damodara (2006), Life, Matter and their interactions, Bhaktivedanta Institute, ISBN 81-901369-9-2

== See also ==
- Gaudiya Vaishnavism
- United Religions Initiative
