= World Vaisnava Association =

International Hindu organization

World Vaisnava Association — Visva Vaisnava Raj Sabha
- Abbreviation: WVA–VVRS
- Established: 18 November 1994 (31 years ago)
- Founders: 28 sannyasis and members of 19 missions
- Founded at: Vrindavan, India
- Type: Religious organization
- Purpose: Mediation; Educational; Missionary; Religious studies; Spirituality
- Headquarters: Vrindavan, India
- Region served: Worldwide
- Official languages: English
- President: Srila Bhakti B. Tirtha Maharaj
- Main organ: Council; Managing Committee; Council Supervisors
- Affiliations: Gaudiya Vaishnavism
- Website: wva-vvrs.org/index.htm

The World Vaisnava Association, officially, World Vaisnava Association — Visva Vaisnava Raj Sabha (WVA–VVRS), is an international Gaudiya Vaishnava religious organization, which had been established in 1994 by some Gaudiya leaders for coordination the global mission for glorification the Supreme Lord Krishna. The name of organization refers to the Visva Vaisnava Raj Sabha ("Royal World Vaisnava Association") formed in 1885 by Bhaktivinoda Thakur and to Vaishnavism in whole. Howsoever, de facto, the WVA was founded and includes only Gaudiya Vaishnavas, and barely from splinted branches of the revivalist reformist order of the first half of the 20th century, Gaudiya Math.

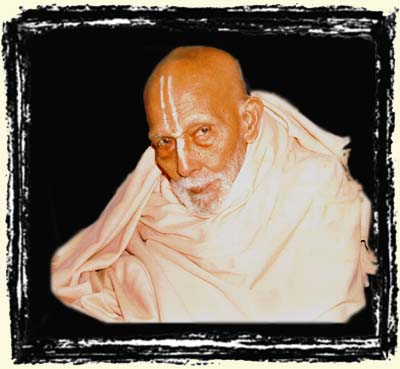
Bhakti Pramod Puri Goswami (1898–1999), the first president of the WVA–VVRS, founder-acharya of the Sri Gopinatha Gaudiya Math.

Already in February 1994 the leaders published initial copy of the periodical World Vaisnava Association Newsletter. In November 1994 a founding meeting joined 120 participants. Among the WVA prominent founding members were the 97-year-old Bhakti Pramod Puri Goswami (who became the WVA first president), Bhakti Ballabh Tirtha (a vice-president), Paramadvaiti Swami (a former secretary) and Tripurari Swami. The Association united most of the named branches. At the same time, such well-known successors of the Gaudiya Math as the Gaudiya Mission and ISKCON are not its members. ISKCON participates only by some figures, such as Bhaktisvarupa Damodar Swami.

The WVA recognizes solely traditional denominations, those perceive extraordinal role of the Gaudiya Math, and are not promoting any particular teachings (as example of rejected novation, the ideas of the ritvik movement).

The main structure of the WVA comprises a Council, a Managing Committee and a Council Supervisors. Since 2002, the president of WVA is the acharya of the Sri Chaitanya Gaudiya Math, Srila Bhakti B. Tirtha Maharaj. And the main forums are twice a year organizational meetings. Thou, as notes in 2004 the scholar Jan Brzezinski, there is little real cooperation among these branches, and the World Vaisnava Association has not "met with much success."
