= Bhakti Ballabh Tirtha =

Srila Bhakti Ballabh Tirtha Goswami Maharaj
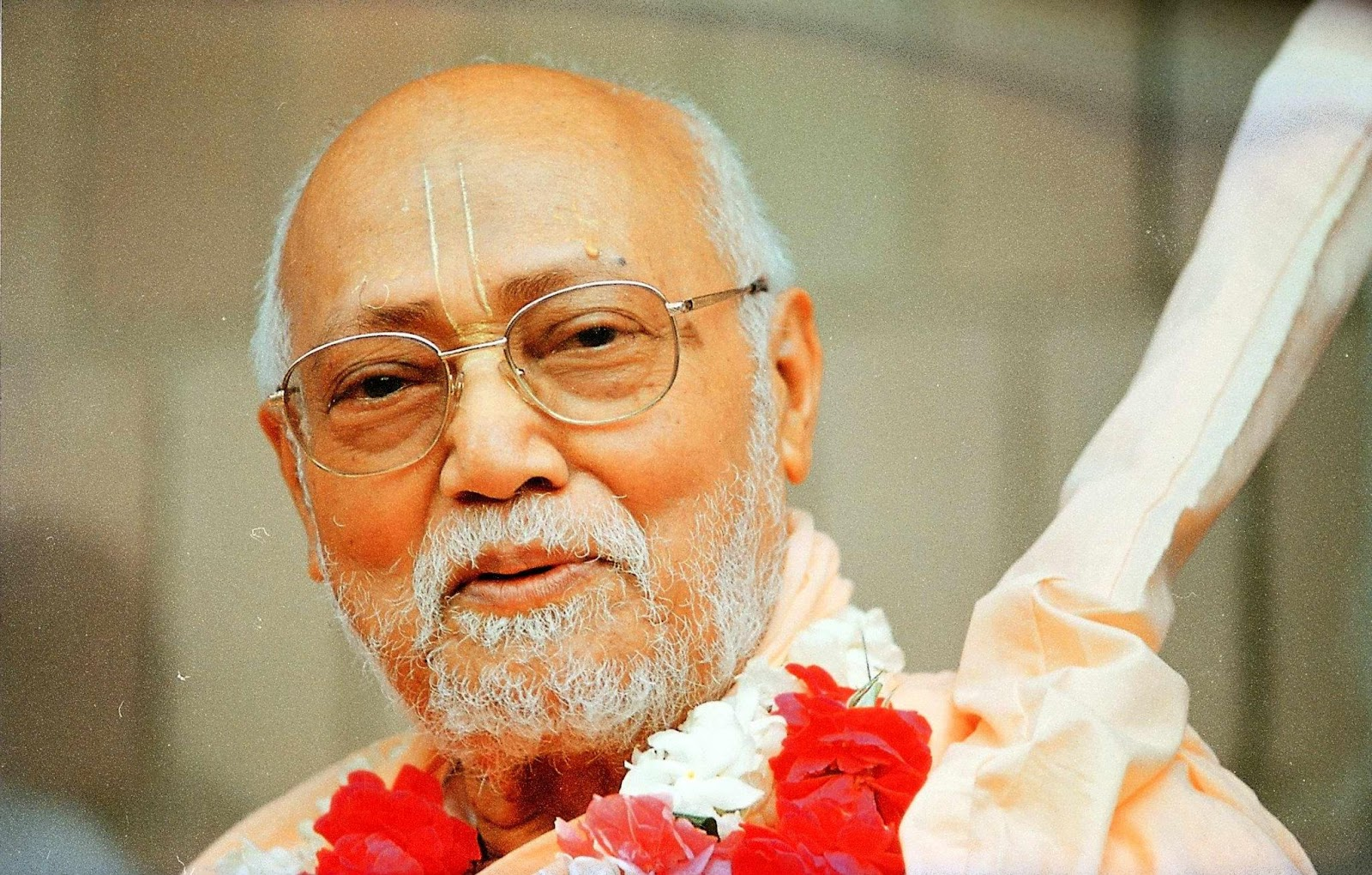
- Srila Bhakti Ballabh Tirtha Goswami Maharaj

Personal life
- Born: Kamakhya Charan Guharay (Birth Name); 24 April 1924 Goalpara, Assam, India
- Died: 21 April 2017 (aged 92) Calcutta, West Bengal, India
- Notable work: See Publications section
- Education: M.A. Philosophy, Calcutta University (1946)
- Website: www.sreecgmath.org

Religious life
- Religion: Hinduism
- Initiation: Diksa–1947, Sannyasa–1961

Religious career
- Teacher: Bhakti Dayita Madhava
- Post: President of Sree Chaitanya Gaudiya Math, President of WVA
- Predecessor: Bhakti Dayita Madhava

Bhakti Ballabh Tirtha (24 April 1924 - 21 April 2017) was a disciple of Bhakti Dayita Madhava and an acharya and initiating spiritual master (Sri Guru) in the Gaudiya Math following the philosophy of the Bhakti marg, specifically of Caitanya Mahaprabhu and Gaudiya Vaishnava theology. He was the President Acharya of Sree Chaitanya Gaudiya Math, headquartered at Kolkata, West Bengal, India and having more than 22 branches in India. He was president of the World Vaisnava Association and founder of GOKUL (Global organization for Krishna Chaitanya's Universal Love).

He wrote extensively in Bengali, Hindi, and English. His most read and referenced book is Sri Caitanya and His Associates, which details the lives of an entire lineage of Gaudiya Vaishnava spiritual leaders, from the 10th century to the present day.

Bhakti Ballabh Tirtha died on 21 April 2017, at the Sree Caitanya Gaudiya Math Temple, Kolkata. His samadhi was installed on 22 April in the holy city of Mayapur at Sree Chaitanya Gaudiya math, Mayapur.

== Early life ==
He was born on 13 April 1924, on the day of Ram Navami, in Goalpara, Assam, India. He is a disciple of Bhakti Dayita Madhava, who founded Sree Chaitanya Gaudiya Math in 1953. He was appointed as the president for Sree Chaitanya Gaudiya Math in 1979. He also serves as the president of the World Vaishnava Association (WVA).

He travelled and spread the teachings of Chaitanya Mahaprabhu around the world. He is among the most read masters in the speaking tree initiative of The Times of India.

Bhakti Ballabh Tirtha Maharaj died on the night of 20 April 2017 at his temple in the city of Calcutta in the Indian state of West Bengal. On 22 April a large procession was carried out from Calcutta to the city of Mayapur in the same state. In the temple of Sri Chaitanya Gaudiya Math the Vedic rituals pertinent to the Rupanuga branch were finally carried out and their body was covered with lime and a temple known as "samadhi" will be built there.

== Publications ==
One of the major contributions of Srila Bhakti Ballabh Tirtha Maharaj are the books authored by him. His books are based on Vedic scriptures and are clear reflections of the teachings of Chaitanya Mahaprabhu and of Gaudiya Vaishnavism. Below is the list of his books:

- Sri Chaitanya: His Life and Associates ( ISBN 978-1886069282)
- Dasavatara (ISBN 1932771824) This is a commentary on the Ten Manifestations of Sri Vishnu, described in Gita Govinda, composed by Jayadeva Goswami.
- Sages of Ancient India (ISBN 1886069581)
- A Taste of Transcendence (ISBN 1886069719)
- Sudha Bhakti (ISBN 1886069360)
- Affectionately Yours-Divine Letters This book is an extensive collection of letters (1981-2012) written by Bhakti Ballabh Tirtha to his disciples as a response to their spiritual inquiries.
- Sages, Saints and Kings of Ancient India This book is a compilation of pastimes of legendary personalities from Vedic Scriptures such as Bhagavata Purana, Mahabharata and Ramayana.
- Harikatha And Vaishnava Aparadha
- Nectar of Harikatha
- Path of Pure Devotion
