= Shrivatsa Goswami =

Indologist and Hindu religious leader (born 1950)

Shri Shrivatsa Goswami

Personal life
- Born: 27 October 1950 (age 75) Vrindavan, Uttar Pradesh, India

Religious life
- Religion: Hinduism
- Denomination: Gaudiya Vaishnavism
- Lineage: Goswamis

Religious career
- Based in: Vrindavan
- Post: Acharya of Radha Raman Temple; Director of the Sri Caitanya Prema Samsthana
- Predecessor: Purushottam Goswami

Academic background
- Education: Banaras Hindu University

Academic work
- Discipline: Indology
- Institutions: Banaras Hindu University
- Main interests: Hindu philosophy; Hindu art

Shrivatsa Goswami (born 27 October 1950) is an Indian Indologist scholar as well as Gaudiya Vaishnava religious leader.

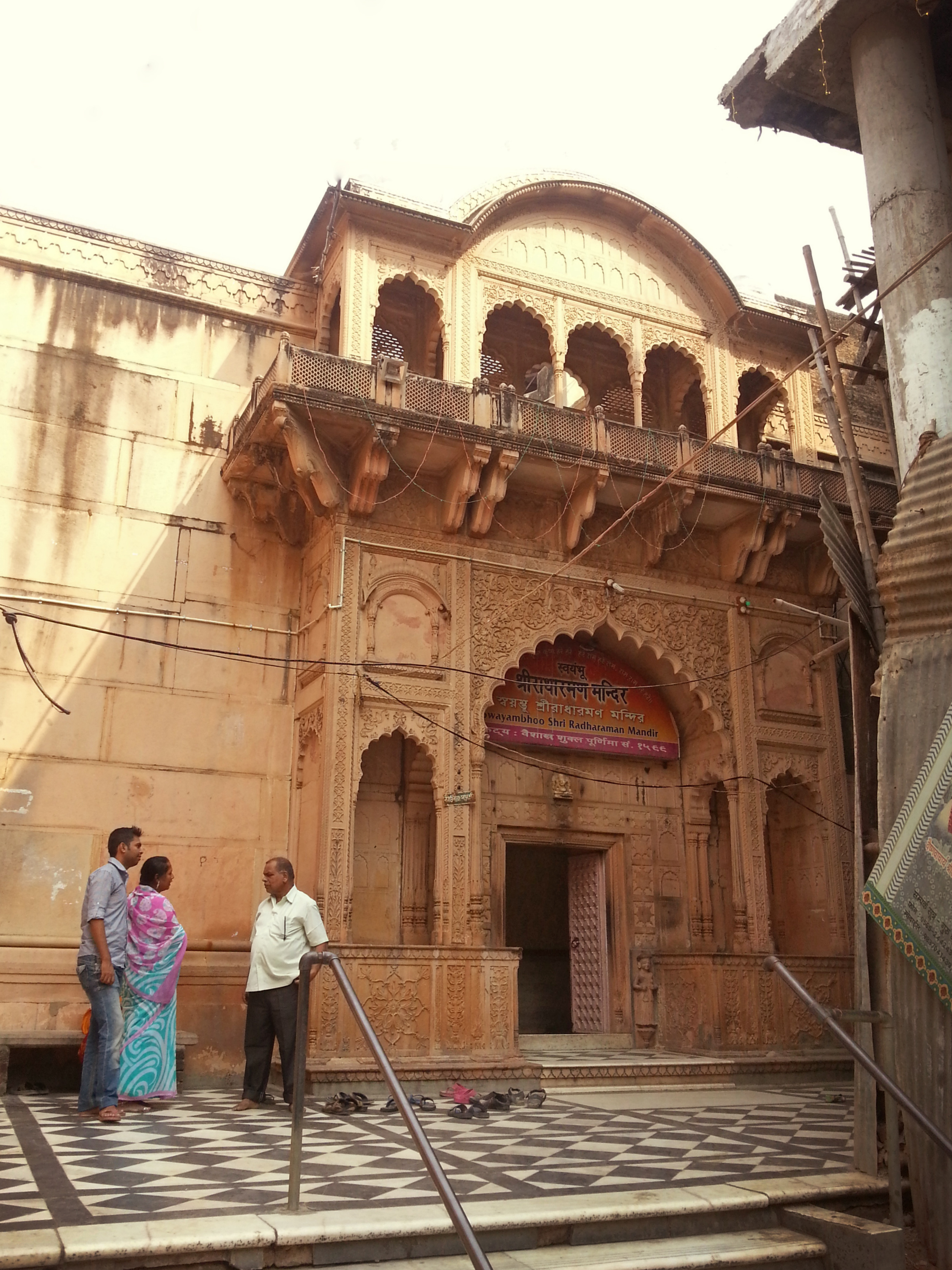
Entrance Radha Raman Temple.

He was born in the Vaishnava pilgrimage site of Vrindavan, into a brahmin family whose members were caretakers of Radha Raman Temple for more than four centuries, one of the known Vrindavan temples, founded by Chaitanya's associate, the saint Gopala Bhatta Goswami. Shrivatsa Goswami's father, Purushottam Goswami, was the temple leading priest. In accordance with the family tradition, Shrivatsa Goswami became the acharya of Radha Raman temple. In 1972, he founded a scientific and cultural organization, the "Sri Caitanya Prema Samsthana", to the propagation of traditional Vaishnavism, patronised the arts (Raslila dance and other) and scholarship on Vaishnavism, particularly in Vrindavan.

Shrivatsa Goswami is a graduate in philosophy of the Banares Hindu University, where he later has taught philosophy and religion. In the mid-1970s he was a visiting scholar at the Harvard Divinity School's Center for the Study of World Religions. Shrivatsa Goswami has been associated with the Indian Council of Philosophical Research (a member of the board of editors of the Encyclopedia of Indian Philosophers) and the Indira Gandhi National Centre for the Arts (that is a sponsor for his Vraja Research Project). His scholarly publications in India and the West focus on Vaishnavite philosophy and theology, as well as theater and other aspects of the religious culture of the Braj region.

In addition, Shrivatsa Goswami works in the field of interfaith cooperation. Thus, he is the honorary president of Religions for Peace. And Pope Benedict XVI invited him to represent Hinduism at the 25th anniversary of the World Day of Prayer at Assisi in October 2011.

== Selected works ==
Books

- Hawley, John Stratton; Goswami, Shrivatsa (1981). At Play with Krishna: Pilgrimage Dramas from Brindavan. Princeton, NJ: Princeton University Press. ISBN 0691064709.
- Goswami, Shrivatsa (2001). Celebrating Krishna. Vrindavan: Sri Caitanya Prema Samsthana. ISBN 8190138103.

Contributions

- Goswami, Shrivatsa (1982). "Rādhā: The Play and Perfection of Rasa". In Hawley, John Stratton; Wulff, Donna Marie (eds.). The Divine Consort: Rādhā and the Goddesses of India. Berkeley religious studies series, 3. Berkeley, Ca: Graduate Theological Union. pp. 72–88. ISBN 0-89581-102-2.
- Goswami, Shrivatsa; Gelberg, Steven J. (1983). "Interview with Shrivatsa Goswami". In Gelberg, Steven J. (ed.). Hare Krishna, Hare Krishna: Five Distinguished Scholars on the Krishna Movement in the West, Harvey Cox, Larry D. Shinn, Thomas J. Hopkins, A. L. Basham, Shrivatsa Goswami. Grove Press Eastern Philosophy and Literature Series. New York: Grove Press. pp. 196–258. ISBN 0394624548.
- Goswami, Shrivatsa (1983). "Review of Śrīla Prabhupāda-Līlāmṛta by Satsvarūpa dāsa Goswāmī". The Journal of Asian Studies. 42 (4). Ann Arbor, Mi: Association for Asian Studies: 986–988. doi:10.2307/2054828. ISSN 0021-9118. JSTOR 2054828. S2CID 164018245.
- Goswami, Shrivatsa (1992). "Acintya Bhedābheda". In Rosen, Steven J. (ed.). Vaiṣṇavism: Contemporary Scholars Discuss the Gaudiya Tradition. New York: FOLK Books. pp. 249–260. ISBN 0-9619763-6-5.
- Goswami, Shrivatsa; Case, Margaret H. (2006). "The Miraculous: The Birth of a Shrine". John S. Hawley & Vasudha Narayanan. The Life of Hinduism. Berkeley, Ca: University of California Press. pp. 53–62. ISBN 0520249143.

Co-editor

- Potter, Karl H., ed. (1970–2019). Encyclopedia of Indian Philosophers. Vol. 1–25-. Delhi: Motilal Banarsidass. Archived from the original on 1 February 2022. Ongoing series project.
