= Raghunatha Bhatta Goswami =

Follower of Chaitanya Mahaprabhu (1505–1579)

Raghunatha Bhatta Goswami (1505–1579) was a well known follower of the Vaishnava saint Chaitanya Mahaprabhu, and member of the influential Gaudiya Vaishnava group collectively known as the Six Goswamis of Vrindavan. He is regarded by followers in the Gaudiya tradition as an ideal practitioner of the Bhakti yoga system.

== Early life ==
Raghunatha Bhatta Goswami was born in a devotional family in Eastern Bengal. His father, Tapana Mishra was a devout Vaishnava and would sometimes invite Chaitanya Mahaprabhu to dine at his house. When Chaitanya Mahaprabhu visited Sri Tapana Misra's home, Raghunatha Bhatta would often massage his feet.

In his early years Raghunatha spent much time in study, becoming adept in Sanskrit grammar and rhetoric and well versed in the scriptures. When his formal studies were complete his father sent him to Puri, where he again met Chaitanya Mahaprabhu, spending eight months in his service and cooking for him on a regular basis. Pleased by his service Chaitanya Mahaprabhu offered Raghunatha a tulsi garland from around his own neck.

== Later life ==
After Raghunatha Bhatta's parents had died, he returned to Jagannath Puri where he spent a further eight months in Mahaprabhu's service. Chaitanya Mahaprabhu then sent Raghunatha to Vrindavana, to study the Bhagavata Purana and other Vedic and Puranic scriptures under the guidance of his disciples Rupa Goswami and Sanatana Goswami. It is here that he officially became part of the Six Goswamis group.

== Legacy ==
Some time after Raghunatha's passing, his disciples built a temple for Sri Gaura Govinda in Vrindavana. He is offered respects as a guru by all of the current lineages of the Gaudiya Vaishnava tradition. Shri Raghunatha Bhatta Goswami was having two main deciples namely Shri Gadadhar Bhatt Goswami a famous Hindi Poet and Shri Krishna Das Kaviraj Goswami who wrote the Chaitanya Charitamrit. Shri Chaitanya Mahaprabhu gifted him A Shrimadbhagwatam and Tulsi Mala which is still preserved and worshiped by their successors at Shri Raghunath Bhatt Goswami Peeth, Bhatt Ji ke Haveli, Vrindavan along with their Paduka (Wooden Sandals)

== See also ==
- Hare Krishna (mantra)
- Nityananda
- Gaudiya Math
- International Society for Krishna Consciousness
- Krishnology
