= Kailasa Candra Dasa =

American astrologer (born 1951)

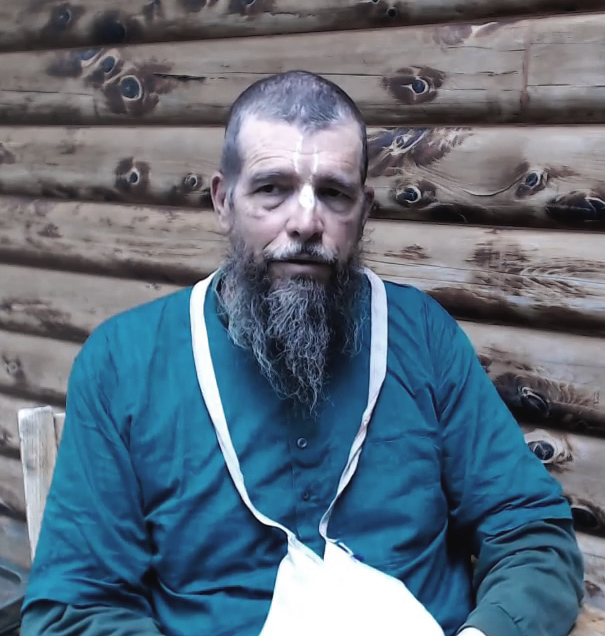
- Kailasa Candra in 2018

Personal life
- Born: 9 January 1951 (age 75) United States
- Other names: Jerould Kiel Goodwin, Mark Goodwin, Jacob Joseph Jay
- Website: www.therealexplanation.org

Religious life
- Religion: Gaudiya Vaishnavism
- Initiation: Harinama diksha, 1972; Brahmana diksha, 1974

Senior posting
- Predecessor: A. C. Bhaktivedanta Swami Prabhupada

Kailasa Candra Dasa (IAST: Kailāsa Candra dāsa; born 9 January 1951), also known as J. K. Goodwin, is an American Gaudiya Vaishnava teacher, sidereal astrologer and author with a small number of students. In 1972, he joined the International Society for Krishna Consciousness (ISKCON) in Madison, Wisconsin. After the passing of ISKCON founder A. C. Bhaktivedanta Swami Prabhupada, he opposed ISKCON's "zonal acharyas", beginning in 1978 and 1979. He is co-founder of the Vaishnava Foundation, a nonprofit organization incorporated under the name Metamorphosis League for Monastic Studies. He works out of the United States. He continues to oppose what he sees as the deviations that emerged within ISKCON after the demise of A. C. Bhaktivedanta Swami Prabhupada.

== Biography ==
Born in early 1951, he was immediately put up for adoption and raised in Glenview, Illinois, as well as Sturgeon Bay, Wisconsin. His conservative, middle-class foster parents, Robert and Gladys Barber, named him Kevin R. Barber. As a child, he suffered from health problems (i.e. severe asthma and undiagnosed autism) and bullying from classmates. Raised Catholic, he embraced Darwinism and atheism in high school. He became sports editor of The Daily Cardinal, while majoring in journalism at the University of Wisconsin in Madison, in the early 1970s. Experiencing an increase in psycho-physical distress, a waning interest in materialism, and a deepening commitment to “Truth or Bust”, he dropped out of college in November 1971. At that time, he became a vegetarian and began studying occult science. In late 1971, he distanced himself from his family. This was after experiencing domestic violence from his angered step-father. The welder, employed in Defense Department shipbuilding, disapproved of his step-son's opposition to the Vietnam War.

Reading Be Here Now (book) and encountering Rudra dās in Madison, Wisconsin led Kevin to the Hare Krishna movement, which he joined in February, 1972. In September 1972, he received Harer Nama diksha initiation from his guru, A. C. Bhaktivedānta Swāmi Prabhupāda at the rural ISKCON compound just outside Moundsville, West Virginia. The spiritual name bestowed on him, Kailāsa Candra dāsa (hereinafter, Kailāsa), identified him as a dāsa/servant of Lord Shiva, The Eminence of Kailāsa, the greatest Vaishnava. In the 1970s, Kailāsa ran Midwest college preaching programs throughout Wisconsin, Illinois, and Indiana. In 1973, Kailāsa's skill and dedication were formally recognized: His guru sent a congratulatory letter to the Evanston, Illinois temple president for the success of its college preaching campaign. It was also in 1973 that Kailāsa became one of the first devotees to distribute Krishna Consciousness publications at O’Hare Airport. Kailāsa secured Brahminical initiation from, and private darshan with, his spiritual master in July, 1974; this was while serving at the Evanston temple. Kailāsa relocated to the Honolulu temple in the spring of 1975. Here he was able to accompany his spiritual master on morning walks and perform percussion accompaniment at guru-pūjas. He helped organize a dialogue between Srila Prabhupāda and Yogi Bhajan. Later, he was appointed temple president of the movement's rural ashram near Mauna Kea.

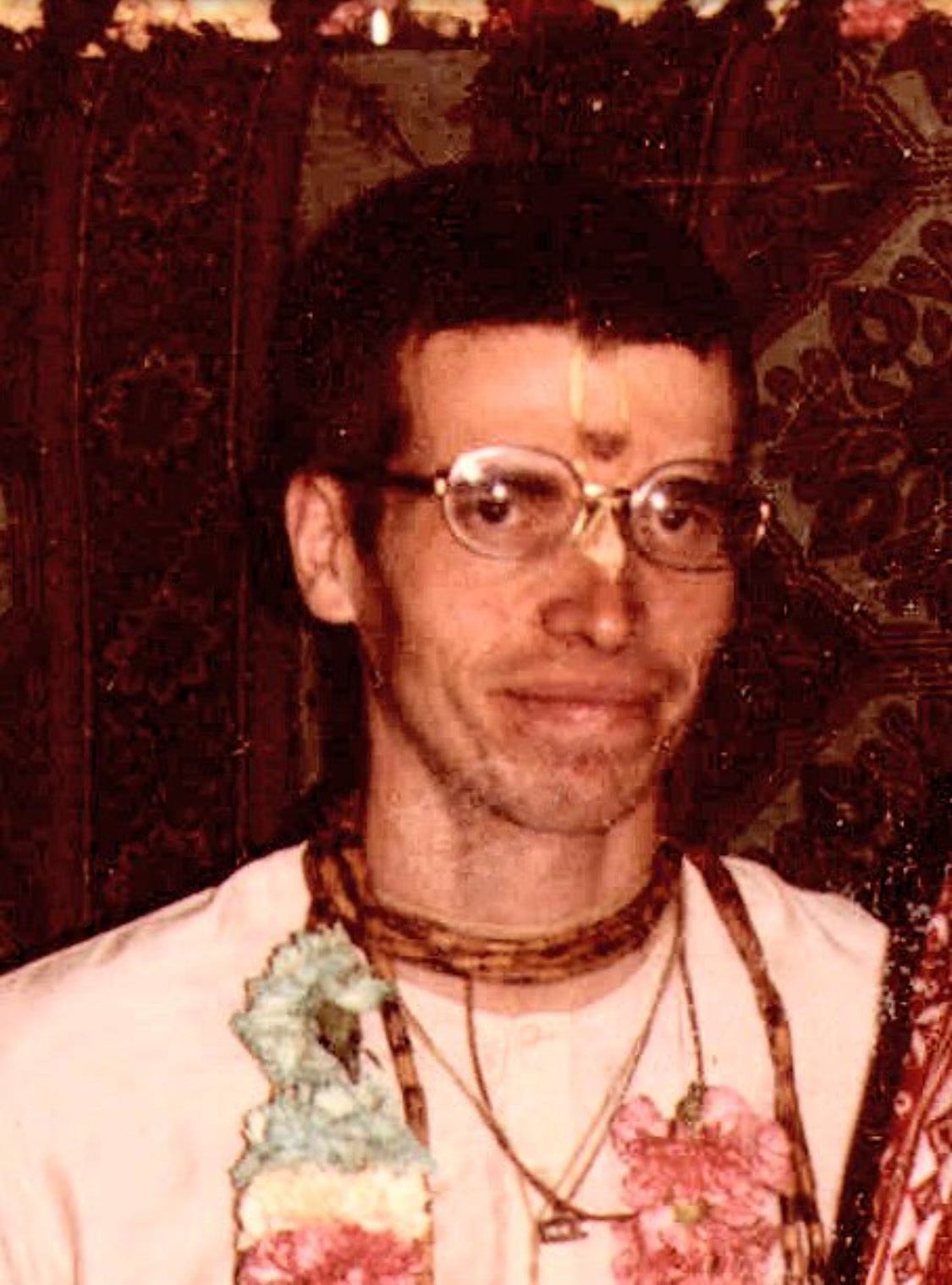
Kailāsa Candra Dāsa in the 1980s

He traveled throughout Europe propagating Krishna Consciousness in mid-1976. During 1977, he made his first of three pilgrimages to India. After the disappearance of the founder of the Hare Krishna movement, A. C. Bhaktivedānta Swāmi Prabhupāda, in November 1977, through controversial circumstances, Kailāsa became alarmed by the movement's trajectory. He was ordered by the Southern U.S. zone governing commissioner of ISKCON to sell drug paraphernalia in 1978 as a fund-raising initiative. This, along with other deviations from his spiritual master's guiding principles, led him to sever connections with the “ISKCON” establishment in the summer of 1978. He was one of the early reformers entering the battle against the "ISKCON" zonal acharyas in Vrindaban, India, in 1978 and 1979. Asked by a leader of that reform group, Kailāsa was the devotee who compiled a lengthy position paper against the zonal acharya system. He was one of the first members to be ostracized from the now changed "ISKCON" movement. A 1979 resolution statement issued by the new “ISKCON” Governing Body Commission warned all "ISKCON" centers about Kailasa's activities.

In the late spring of 1985, Kailāsa was contacted by Sulocana Dāsa, who was in need of an editor for his tracts that were meant to be combined into an eventual book. Kailasa traveled with him throughout America, in his godbrother's converted van, during the summer and early autumn of that year, finalizing the edited work. At the behest of one of the “ISKCON” zonals, Kailāsa's friend, Sulochan Dāsa, was assassinated in Los Angeles in May 1986, while in his van.

In January, 1988, Kailāsa co-founded The Vaishnava Foundation. The foundation was first formed as an unincorporated association in Lake County, CA, in December 1986. It was later incorporated, in Sacramento, California on Jan. 20, 1988. Due to its established history, The Vaishnava Foundation has been listed in academic encyclopedias of world religions and American religions. Kailāsa is the author of over one hundred articles, published on the Vaishnava Foundation's websites, along with more than thirty video presentations. In July 2023, Kailasa appeared in an interview by Nathan Hartley from The Hare Krishna Project.

== Philosophy / Thought ==
In Western Vaishnava circles, Kailāsa is known as a staunch critic of the corruption that emerged after his spiritual master's departure. In the following quote, he depicts the importance of exposing such deviations:

Based in no small measure upon deductions rooted in Srila Prabhupāda’s teachings, this document will work to concentrate the mind. The big lies will be broken down. Once you are awakened from their intoxicating influence, the dismantling of the bogus philosophies underpinning them will inexorably proceed via the domino effect. The psychic shackles will fall off, and you will experience a natural freedom of mind and intelligence conducive to the development of genuine Krishna consciousness.

Kailāsa's ministry emphasizes the threats of congregationalism, institutionalism, party-spirit factionalism and truth-diluting “unity” collaborations to the Krishna consciousness movement and the need to discriminate between bhakti-driven by sentimentality and authentic sadhana founded upon the shastra of previous spiritual masters. His critiques have led to harsh criticisms from some Gaudiya circles, including “ISKCON Truth”, ISKCON Revival Movement, et al. The Vaishnava Foundation aims to promote Krishna consciousness in the pristine form presented by His Divine Grace A.C. Bhaktivedānta Swāmi Prabhupāda and to prophetically expose and oppose deviations in the Krishna consciousness movement which have arisen since his disappearance. The motto displayed on the homepage of The Vaishnava Foundation declares: "The highest truth is reality distinguished from illusion for the welfare of all." Srimad Bhagavatam 1.1.2

== Bibliography ==
=== Publications ===
- Vyasa Puja Homage (ISKCON Honolulu), 1975
- Vyasa Puja Homage (ISKCON Honolulu), 1976
- “On the Measure of Our Conviction” treatise, 1980
- “Guru is Never Appointed” tract, 1981
- “Overall Considerations of the Bona Fide Spiritual Master” tract, 1981
- “Shastric Considerations Concerning the Monitor Guru” tract, 1981
- “The Appointment That Never Was” tract, 1981
- “The Spiritual Master Never Deviates from Shastra” tract,1981
- “When You Hear Someone Say in the Following Way” tract, 1981
- "On Sufficient Guidance" treatise, 1992
- "The Positive Alternative" treatise, 1992
- "The Proof Of One Tooth" treatise, 1998
- "How The Impersonal Philosophy Can Stand?" treatise, 1998
- "Myth of The 'Final Order'" treatise, 1998
- "A Closer Look at Siksa-Guru" treatise, 2007
- "To Expose the New Theory" treatise, 2008
- "Srila Prabhupada Was Makara Lagna" treatise, 2009
- "To Expose the New Theory" treatise, 2009
- "GBC: The Gods Who Failed" treatise, 2010
- "Boon-dog-ill: Beyond "ISKCON" Triumphalism" treatise, 2010
- "A Closer Look at Siksa-Guru" treatise, 2011

=== Books ===
- Goodwin, J. K. (29 October 2009). Reclaiming the Lost Tarot: Knowledge of Its Hidden Sequence in Human Life. Author. ISBN 978-1449564087.
- Goodwin, J. K. (19 June 2009). Advanced Primer of Sidereal Astrology. Author. ISBN 978-1448608690.
- Goodwin, J. K. (12 July 2009). Messages From Nostradamus Revealed. Author. ISBN 978-1448617920.
- Goodwin, J. K. (12 July 2009). Buddhi-yoga and System Ouspensky: A Commentary on His Essential Teachings. Author. ISBN 978-1448608874.
- Bhaktivinoda Thakur (14 July 2011). The awakening of truth: Awakened intelligence in absolute truth. Translated by Kailasa Candra dasa. Kailasa Candra dasa. ISBN 978-1463733513.. Translation of Bhaktivinoda Thakur. Tattva-viveka (in Sanskrit). Translated by Kailasa Candra dasa.
- Kailasa Candra dasa (2019). Beyond Institutional Gurus, Initiations, And Party Men. Vaishnava Foundation / Kala Parusha Publications. ISBN 978-1696849661.
- Kailasa Candra dasa (2024). On Consciousness & The Perfection of Man. Vaishnava Foundation / Kala Parusha Publications. ISBN 979-8339251873.

=== Editing work ===
- Bryant, Steve (1985). Kailasa Candra Dasa (ed.). The Guru Business.
