= Bhakti Rakshak Sridhar =

Indian guru

Srila Bhakti Rakshak Sridhar Dev-Goswami Maharaj

Personal life
- Born: Ramendra Chandra Bhattacarya; 10 October 1895 Hapaniya, Burdwan, Bengal Presidency, British India
- Died: 12 August 1988 (aged 92) Nabadwip, West Bengal, India
- Resting place: Temple of Union in Separation, Sri Chaitanya Saraswat Math, Nabadwip; 23.390573°N 88.363274°E
- Notable work(s): The Search for Sri Krishna, Sri Guru and His Grace, The Golden Volcano of Divine Love
- Education: Krishnath College (BA), Berhampore, Bengal Presidency

Religious life
- Religion: Hinduism
- Denomination: Gaudiya Vaishnavism
- Temple: Gaudiya Math, Sri Chaitanya Saraswat Math
- Lineage: Gaudiya-Saraswata Sampradaya
- Initiation: Diksha (as Ramendra Sundara), 1926; Sannyasa (as Bhakti Rakshak Sridhar), 1930

Religious career
- Post: founder-president-acharya of the Sri Chaitanya Saraswat Math
- Predecessor: Bhaktisiddhanta Saraswati
- Website: Sri Chaitanya Saraswati Math

Bhakti Rakshak Sridhar (IAST: Bhakti-rakṣaka Śrīdhara; 10 October 1895 – 12 August 1988) was an Indian guru, writer, sannyasi and spiritual leader in the Gaudiya Vaishnava tradition of Chaitanya Mahaprabhu, founder-president-acharya of the Sri Chaitanya Saraswat Math.

Recognised as a "profound thinker" and "learned representative of the theistic conception of Gaudiya Vaishnavism", Sridhar was a senior disciple of Bhaktisiddhanta Saraswati and elder "godbrother" (i.e. received initiation from the same guru) to A. C. Bhaktivedanta Swami Prabhupada, founder of the International Society for Krishna Consciousness (the ‘Hare Krishnas’), to whose young disciples he provided spiritual guidance after Prabhupada's passing in 1977.

== Early life ==
Born Ramendra Chandra (Rāmendra Candra) into a family of a high-class Bengali brahmins (his family bore the aristocratic title, or upādhi, of Bhattacharya), Sridhar joined his guru's mission, the Gaudiya Math, in 1926, taking diksha initiation from Bhaktisiddhanta Saraswati as Ramendra Sundara (Rāmendra Sundara).

On the meaning of his first spiritual name, Sridhar recalled: “My original name was Ramendra Candra. When I was given initiation, Srila Bhaktisiddhanta Saraswati Thakura gave me the name Ramendra Sundara. I asked him, “What is the meaning of Ramendra?” He told me, “In our consideration, Rama does not mean Dasarathi Rama or Lord Ramacandra, the son of King Dasaratha. It means Radha-ramana Rama – Krsna, the lover of Radharani.”

Before being sent by Saraswati to locate the site where Chaitanya Mahaprabhu spoke with Ramananda Ray on the banks of the Godavari (Rāmānanda Saṁvāda), his guru gave him the new name Ramananda Das (Rāmānanda dāsa), meaning servant of Ramananda. He finally became Bhakti Rakshak, meaning 'Guardian of Devotion', after taking sannyasa in 1930.

== Sri Chaitanya Saraswat Math ==
In 1941, after the death of his guru, Sridhar founded his own international mission, becoming acharya of the monastic and missionary society "Sri Chaitanya Saraswat Math," in Nabadwip, now in West Bengal.

His chosen successor was his disciple, Bhakti Sundar Govinda Dev-Goswami, who led the math until his death in 2010.

== Relationship with Prabhupada ==
Though "something of an outsider in his spiritual master's original movement", Prabhupada, ISKCON's founder, had "strong friendships with two prominent sannyasi godbrothers, Bhakti Rakshak Sridhar (1895–1983) [sic], founder of the Chaitanya Saraswata Math, and Bhakti Prajnan Keshava (1898–1968), founder of the Gaudiya Vedanta Samiti."

After Prabhupada's death in 1977, Sridhar Maharaja gave instruction to Prabhupada's disciples, with Americans Bhaktivedanta Tripurari and Jayatirtha Swami and Hungarian devotee Dvarakesa Swami (Bhakti Abhay Narayan) among the prominent ex-ISKCON members to take shiksha or sannyasa initiation from Sridhar.

Prabhupada and Sridhar were close, having a "long and intimate relationship" over almost five decades. Prabhupada described Sridhar as the "most highly competent of all my godbrothers" and "even my shiksha-guru". He had previously asked Sridhar to be president of the new institution he planned to set up following the disintegration of the original Gaudiya Math. He later described how Sridhar had agreed to "cooperate with our society" (ISKCON), and had his disciples honour Sridhar's Vyasa-puja (birthday), in order than ISKCON's young brahmacharis “shall learn how to celebrate the spiritual master's birthday.”

== Honorifics ==
In a Gaudiya Vaishnava context, Sridhar's full title is Srila Bhakti Rakshak Sridhar Dev-Goswami Maharaj, (where Śrīla, an adjectival form of Śrī, is a respectful honorific akin to 'Reverend', and Mahārāja means 'Great King', while Gosvāmī reflects his status as a sannyasi).

He is known simply as Srila Guru Maharaj within Sri Chaitanya Saraswat Math.
