= Six Goswamis of Vrindavan =

Group of devotional teachers (gurus) from the Gaudiya Vaishnava tradition of Hinduism

The Six Goswamis of Vrindavan were a group of devotional teachers (gurus) from the Gaudiya Vaishnava tradition of Hinduism who lived in India during the 15th and 16th centuries. They are closely associated with the land of Vrindavan where they spent much time in service of their guru, Chaitanya Mahaprabhu, who is considered as Krishna's yuga-avatar by the Gaudiya Vaishnava lineage, who highly regard them for their extreme renunciation of physical comforts and pleasures in the practice of Bhakti Yoga, and for their philosophical presentations of his teachings.

== Vrindavan ==
Apart from producing a prolific amount of writings regarding Vaishnava philosophy and practices, the Six Goswamis also dedicated a significant amount of their time to uncovering many ancient and sacred areas of land in Vrindavan associated with Radha, Krishna and the Gopis. These sections of land are the sites wherein Radha and Krishna performed specific lilas during the previous yuga in accordance to the events recorded in the Bhagavata Purana. Although having little in the way of financial possessions themselves, the Goswamis inspired the building of a number of large and ornate temples on and around these sites (dedicated to the worship of Radha and Krishna), which play a role in Vrindavan society to this day.

Caitanya assigned the Six Goswamis the task of systematizing the tenets of Gaudiya Vaisnavism. Of the six, Rupa Goswami was the most influential in giving a theoretical foundation to Gaudiya Vaisnav practice. Haberman notes that it is possible that Abhinava Gupta influenced the Goswamis because Rupa Goswami's writings make significant use of Abhinava's key terms.

Visvanathan (c. 1654-1754), a commentator and author of Gaudiya Vaisnavism, prescribed imitating the Goswamis in physical performance, while imitation of the gopis only through one's inner state.

== Members ==
The six members of the group were:

- The brothers Rupa Goswami and Sanatana Goswami
- Jiva Goswami (nephew of Rupa and Sanatana).
- Raghunatha Bhatta Goswami
- Gopala Bhatta Goswami
- Raghunatha dasa Goswami

== See also ==
- Gaudiya Mission
- Gaudiya Math
- Hare Krishna
- International Society for Krishna Consciousness
- Krishna
- Nityananda
- Chaitanya Mahaprabhu
