= Gaudiya Mission =

Monastic and missionary organization in Calcutta, India

Coordinates: 22°36′10.224″N 88°22′24.672″E

- গৌড়ীয় মিশন
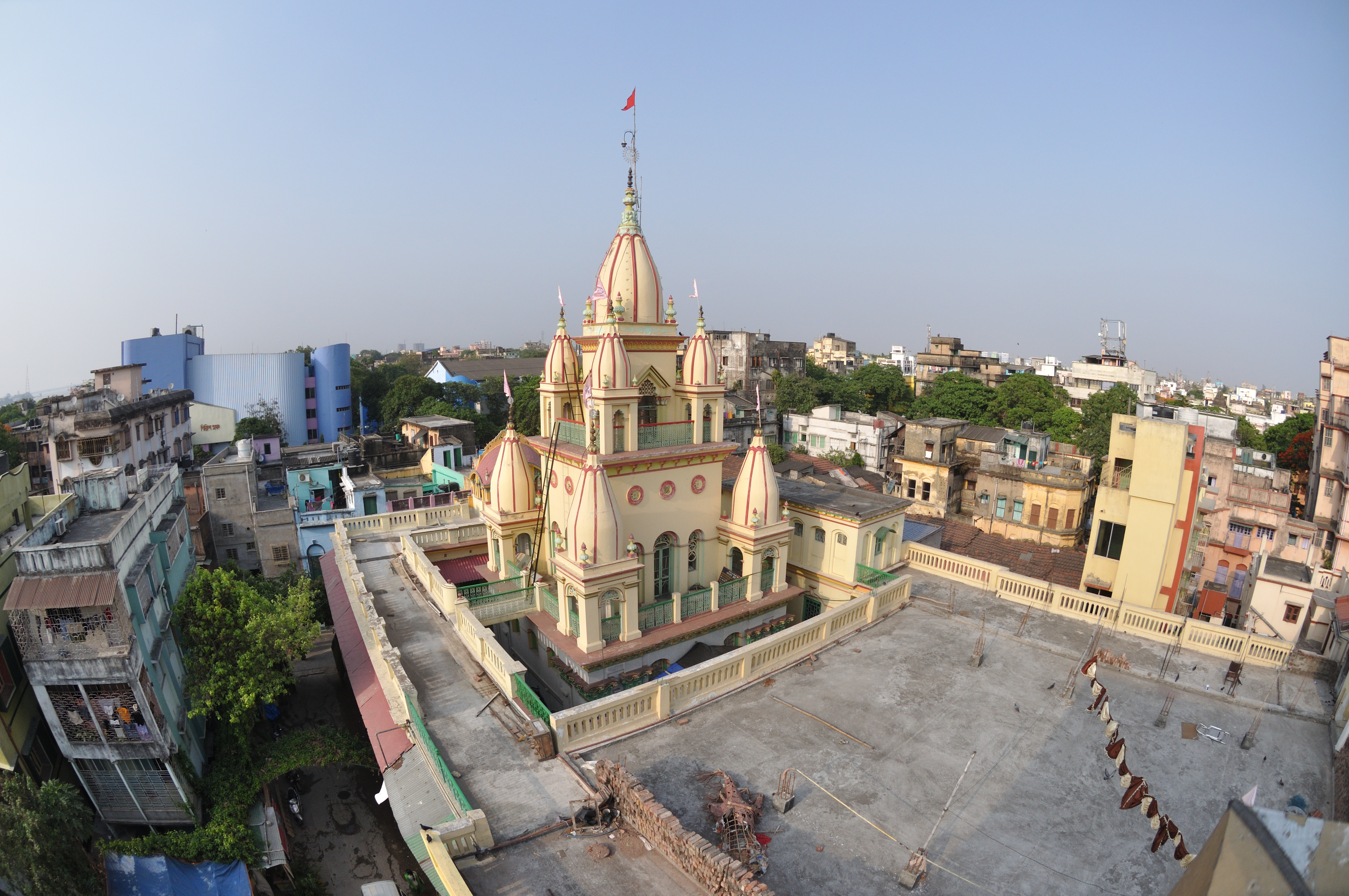
- Sri Gaudiya Math, Bagbazar, Kolkata
- Predecessor: Gaudiya Math
- Established: March 1940 (86 years ago)
- Founded at: Calcutta, British India
- Type: Religious organisation
- Purpose: Educational, philanthropic, religious studies, spirituality
- Headquarters: Kolkata, West Bengal, India
- Location(s): 32 temples in India, UK & US
- Region served: 3 countries
- Official languages: Bengali, Hindi, English
- President-Acharya: Bhakti Sundar Sanyasi Maharaj
- Main organ: Governing Body & Council Body
- Affiliations: Gaudiya Vaishnavism
- Website: gaudiyamission.org

The Gaudiya Mission (Bengali: গৌড়ীয় মিশন) is a Gaudiya Vaishnava monastic and missionary organization. The organisation has been registered since March 1940 in Kolkata (formerly Calcutta) under the supervision of the then acharya, Ananta Vasudev (a.k.a. Srila Acharyadev), later known as Bhakti Prasad Puri Maharaj (25 Aug 1895—8 March 1958 (Note: According to Måns Broo, 1895—1959.)).

== History ==
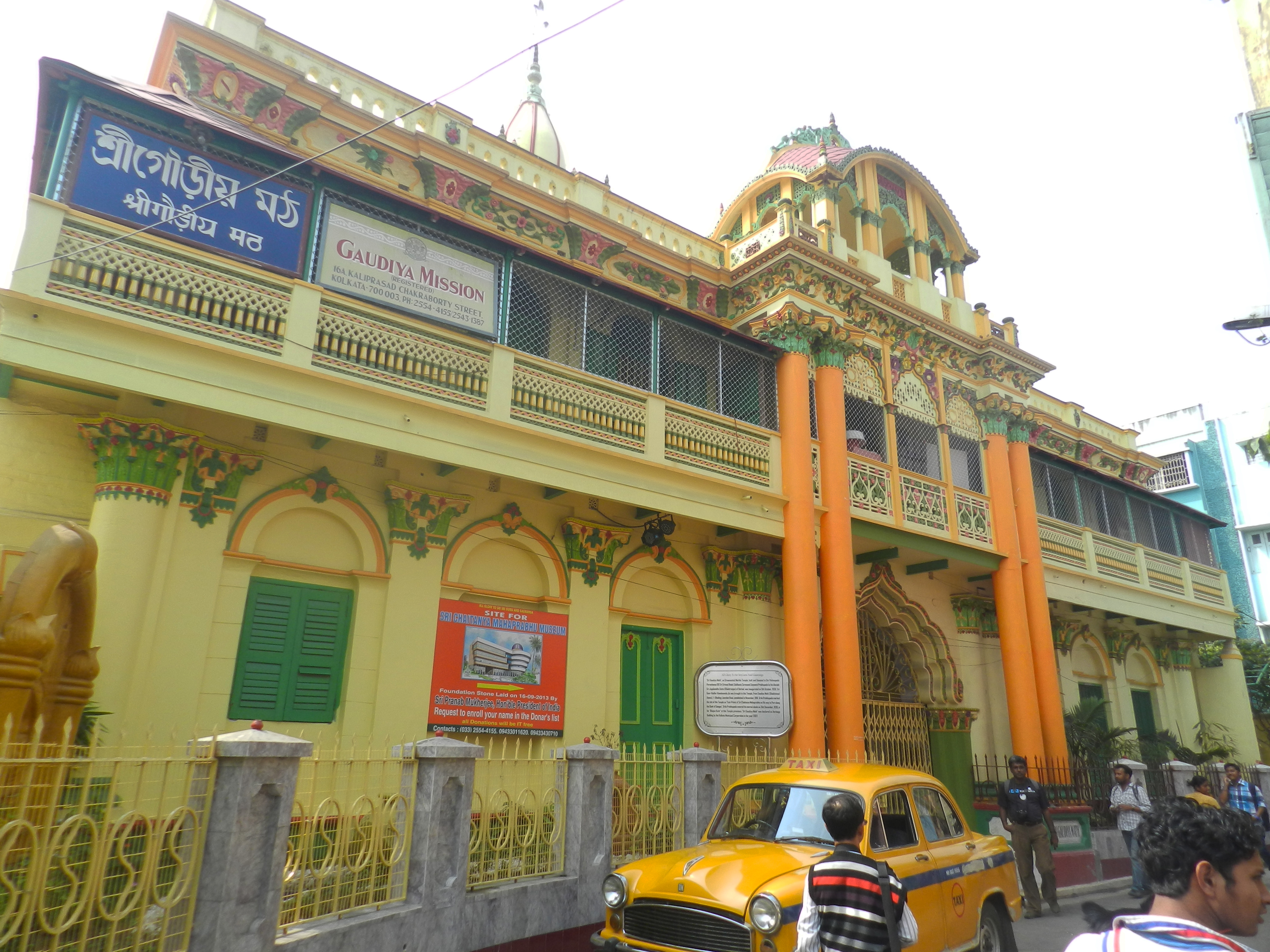
Sri Gaudiya Math, Bagbazar, Kolkata (estd. 1930).

The Gaudiya Mission is the successor organization to the Gaudiya Math, which existed from 1920 to 1937. After Bhaktisiddhanta Sarasvati's death, Ananta Vasudev was elected as his successor. However, Kuñjabihari Vidyabusana ("Kunja Babu"), the secretary and the president of the Gaudiya Math, did not agree with the decision and formed his own group (the Sri Chaitanya Math in Mayapur). Dynamic efforts of Srila Prabhupad, Visva Vaisnava Rajsabha’ transformed to Sri Gaudiya Math and gradually to Gaudiya Mission during the time of Srila Bhakti Prasad Puri Goswami Thakur (Sri Ananta Vasudev Prabhu).At a very early time span Prabhupad extended the list of Maths to 64 across India and abroad by his energetic preaching on the process of unalloyed devotion.

Later Ananta Vasudev started to criticize some of the teachings of Bhaktisiddhanta Sarasvati (particularly, he declared that proselytizing work is not true spirituality), married, settled in Vrindavan, and translated into Bengali 62 papers of the six Goswamis of Vrindavana, classical Gaudiya Vaishnava works. After him, the mission was headed by Bhakti Keval Audulaumi (from 1953 to 1982), Bhakti Srirup Bhagavat (1982–1993), and Bhakti Suhrid Paribrajak (1993–2018). The present acharya is Bhakti Sundar Sanyasi Maharaj.

== Current status ==
The main posts and organs of mission are President-Acharya, President, Governing Body and Council Body. It has 26 temples in India, the UK (London, Sri Vasudev Gaudiya Math, established 1933), and the US (New York, Sri Bhakti Srirup Bhagawat Gaudiya Math, established 2007). It has approximately 60 sannyasis. It has established medical services and dispensaries and publishes a monthly magazine, Bhakti Patra.

== Bibliography ==
- Broo, Måns (2003). As good as God: the guru in Gauḍīya Vaiṣṇavism (PDF). Åbo: Åbo Akademi University Press. ISBN 951-765-132-5. Archived from the original (PDF) on 6 March 2016.
- Brzezinski, Jan (2004). "Charismatic Renewal and Institutionalization in the History of Gaudiya Vashnavism and the Gaudiya Math". In Bryant, Edwin F.; Ekstrand, Maria L. (eds.). The Hare Krishna Movement: The Postcharismatic Fate of a Religious Transplant. New York: Columbia University Press. pp. 73–96. ISBN 0-231-12256-X.
- Sherbow, Paul H. (2004). "A.C. Bhaktivedanta Swami's Preaching in the Context of Gaudiya Vashnavism". In Bryant, Edwin F.; Ekstrand, Maria L. (eds.). The Hare Krishna Movement: The Postcharismatic Fate of a Religious Transplant. New York: Columbia University Press. pp. 129–46. ISBN 0-231-12256-X.
