= ISKCON Revival Movement =

Gaudiya Vaishnavite movement

International Society for Krishna Consciousness Revival Movement
- Abbreviation: IRM
- Predecessor: International Society for Krishna Consciousness
- Type: religious movement
- Purpose: Restoring the original Hare Krishna movement worldwide
- Region served: worldwide
- Affiliations: Gaudiya Vaishnavism
- Website: iskconirm.com

The ISKCON Revival Movement (IRM) was formed as a pressure group in 2000 to revive and reform ISKCON on the basis of the directives for succession given by Srila Prabhupada, the founder of ISKCON. IRM opposes both the zonal guru system and its replacement multiple-guru system as unauthorized innovations.

== IRM's aim and followership ==
The IRM’s followers consist of both current and former ISKCON members, ISKCON Life Members, and members of the Hindu community at large. The IRM’s ultimate goal is to rebuild an ISKCON movement operating as Srila Prabhupada intended, with him as the sole guru and authority.

== Zonal and multiple-guru systems ==
Srila Prabhupada issued, on July 9, 1977, a signed directive appointing 11 of his senior managers to act as ritviks (officiating priests) to initiate new recruits into the ISKCON movement on his behalf. According to the IRM (and its philosophical treatise “The Final Order”), all future disciples within ISKCON were supposed to revere Srila Prabhupada as their guru in accordance with this directive, not any successor. However, shortly after Srila Prabhupada’s departure on November 14, 1977, these ritviks ignored the directive; instead, they divided the world into 11 zones, each claiming to be the guru or spiritual successor in a different area. By early 1978, the 11 ritviks had begun to initiate disciples on their own behalf, acting as gurus for the movement.

Over time, a number of the gurus suffered lawsuits, suicide, and other problems. The movement was plunged into confusion and acrimony. By the mid-1980s the Governing Body Commission (GBC), which managed ISKCON, issued a new interpretation of Srila Prabhupada's directive. What he had really wanted, it said, was for all disciples to become initiating gurus, not just the 11 ritviks. Today new gurus are added to the roster via a majority vote by the GBC at its annual meetings in Mayapur. Currently ISKCON gurus number around 80.

== IRM's opposition to zonal and multiple-guru systems ==
IRM contends that both the zonal guru system and its replacement multiple-guru system are unauthorized innovations. Citing GBC resolutions and management directives approved by Srila Prabhupada, the IRM insists that ISKCON will continue to flounder as long as it fails to comply with the orders of Srila Prabhupada.

The IRM publishes a free international magazine, Back to Prabhupada. They have met with considerable opposition from those supporting the current multiple-guru system in ISKCON. According to the scholar, Jan Brzezinski, the ritvik model of the movement opens the door on an organization with no need for any charismatic leadership.

== See also ==
- Guru–shishya tradition (parampara)
- Sampradaya

== Sources ==
Secondary sources

- Brzezinski, Jan (2004). "Charismatic Renewal and Institutionalization in the History of Gaudiya Vashnavism and the Gaudiya Math". In Bryant, Edwin F.; Ekstrand, Maria L. (eds.). The Hare Krishna Movement: The Postcharismatic Fate of a Religious Transplant. New York: Columbia University Press. pp. 73–96. ISBN 0-231-12256-X.
- Jones, Constance A.; Ryan, James D. (2007). "International Society for Krishna Consciousness Revival Movement (IRM)". Encyclopedia of Hinduism. Encyclopedia of World Religions. J. Gordon Melton, Series Editor. New York: Facts On File. pp. 199–200. ISBN 978-0-8160-5458-9. Archived from the original on 2022-10-20.
- Rochford, E. Burke (2007). Hare Krishna Transformed. The New and Alternative Religions Series. New York: NYU Press. ISBN 978-0814775790.

Primary sources

- Krishakant, Desai (2001) [1996]. The Final Order. Foreword by Dr. Kim Knott. Bangalore: ISKCON.
