= Gaudiya Vaishnavism =

Hindu religious movement

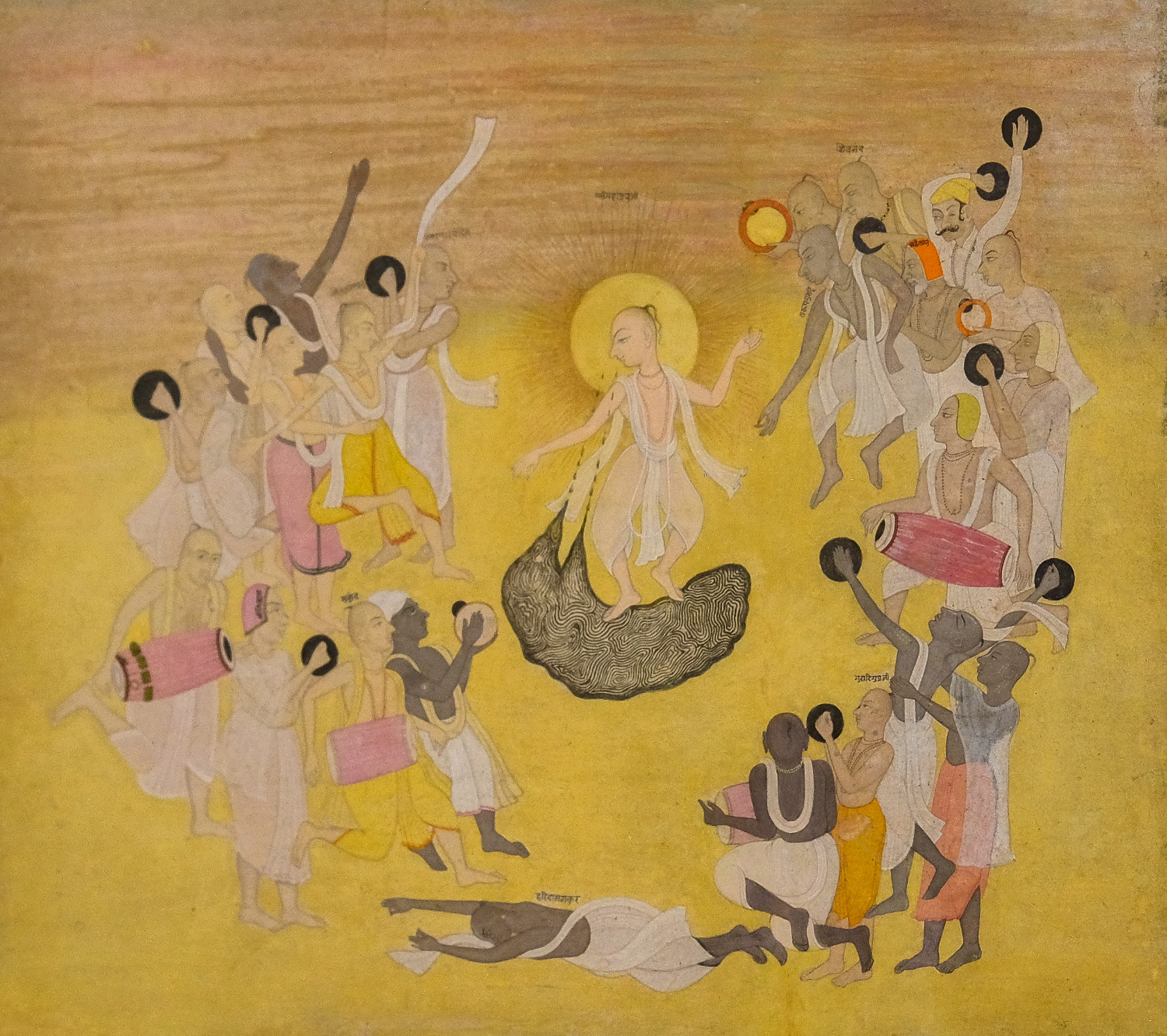
- Chaitanya dances with followers in a puddle of his own tears. Followers include Śivananda, Rūpa Gusāṁī, Murāri Gupta, Haridāsa Ṭhākura, Mukunda, and Nityānanda Prabhu. Kishangarh painting, c. 1750.

Founder
- Chaitanya Mahaprabhu (1486–1534)

Regions with significant populations
- Bengal; Manipur

Religions
- Vaishnavism (Hinduism)

Scriptures
- Bhagavad Gita; Bhagavata Purana; Gita Govinda; Chaitanya Charitamrita

Languages
- Sanskrit; Bengali

Gaudiya Vaishnavism (IAST: Gauḍīya Vaiṣṇavasampradāyaḥ), also known as Chaitanya Vaishnavism, (Note: Other names include Bengali Vaishnavism, the Bengali, Chaitanya or Gaudiya Sampradaya, Chaitanyaism, and Gaura Dharma.) is a Vaishnava religious movement inspired by Chaitanya Mahaprabhu (1486–1534) in India. "Gaudiya" refers to the Gaura or Gauḍa region of Bengal (present-day Malda division of West Bengal and Rajshahi division of Bangladesh) or the ancient Gauda Kingdom (present-day West Bengal and Bangladesh), while Vaishnavism means "the worship of Vishnu". The tradition is part of Krishnaism, a Krishna-centric branch of Vaishnavism.

The theological basis of Gaudiya Vaishnavism is primarily the Bhagavad Gita and Bhagavata Purana, and it was systemetized by the Six Goswamis of Vrindavan and others.

The focus of Gaudiya Vaishnavism is the devotional worship (known as bhakti yoga) of the deities Radha and Krishna, and their divine incarnations, regarded as the supreme forms of God (Svayam Bhagavan). This worship commonly takes the form of singing the holy names of Radha and Krishna, including "Hare", "Krishna" and "Rama", most often in the Hare Krishna mantra, accompanied by kirtan and dancing.

In the late 19th and early 20th centuries, Bengal became the center of a Hindu religious revival. Gaudiya Vaishnavism influenced or served as the basis for several new religious movements, such as the Gaudiya Math, from which international active institutions were later emerged. These include the Gaudiya Mission and the International Society for Krishna Consciousness, often called the "Hare Krishna Movement". Scholar Ferdinando Sardella estimates the number of Gaudiya Vaishnavism adherents at between 30 to 50 million, concentrated primarily in the regions of Orissa, Manipur, West Bengal and Bangladesh.

== Philosophical concepts ==
=== Living beings ===
According to Gaudiya Vaishnava philosophy, consciousness is not a product of matter but a manifestation of the soul (jiva). All living beings (jivas), including animals and trees, possess a soul. The soul is distinct from the physical body and is described as eternal, immutable, and indestructible, with neither birth nor death. When the body dies, the soul transmigrates to another body and takes new birth. Souls captivated by the illusory nature of the world (Maya) are repeatedly reborn among 8.4 million species of life on this planet and in other worlds, in accordance to the laws of karma and individual desire. This concept of samsara (the cycle of rebirth) is consistent with beliefs found in Hinduism, Sikhism, Jainism, and Buddhism.

Release from samsara (known as moksha) is generally considered the ultimate aim of life and is believed achievable through various spiritual practices. However, within Gaudiya Vaishnavism, the ultimate aim is not liberation from the cycle of rebirth but rather bhakti in its purest state or "pure love of God." The tradition further asserts that in the current yuga (age), Kali Yuga, singing and chanting the sacred names of Krishna is sufficient for spiritual liberation.

=== Supreme Person (God) ===
A defining aspect of Gaudiya Vaishnavism is the worship of Krishna specifically as the source of all avataric incarnations of God. Theologians cite verse 1.3.28 of the Bhagavata Purana, "krsnastu bhagavan svayam" (literally "Krishna is God Himself"), as scriptual support for this view. The theologian Jiva Gosvami calls this phrase the "paribhasha-sutra" (definitive rule) of Gaudiya Vaishnava theology and a mahavakya (governing proposition).

=== Inconceivable oneness and difference ===
A distinctive element of Gaudiya Vaishnava philosophy, as taught by Chaitanya Mahaprabhu, is the concept of Achintya Bheda Abheda, which translates to "inconceivable oneness and difference." This concept applies both to the soul's relationship with Krishna, (Note: "It is the living entity's constitutional position to be an eternal servant of Krishna because he is the marginal energy of Krishna and a manifestation simultaneously one with and different from the Lord, like a molecular particle of sunshine or fire.") and to Krishna's relationship with his other energies, including the material world.

In terms of quality, the soul (jiva) is described as identical to God. In terms of quantity, however, individual souls are said to be infinitesimal in comparison to the unlimited Supreme Being. The exact nature of this relationship simultaneously one and different with Krishna, and different from him is considered inconceivable to the human mind but accessible through the practice of Bhakti yoga.

This philosophy is presented as a synthesis of two opposing schools of Hindu philosophy: pure monism (which holds God and the soul as one entity) and pure dualism (which holds them as absolutely separate). The concept largely recapitulates the qualified nondualism (Vishishtadvaita) of older Vedantic school but emphasizes the Krishna over Narayana and prioritizes holy sites in Vrindavan and Bengal over sites in Tamil Nadu. In practice, Gaudiya Vaishnava philosophy has more in common with the dualistic schools, particularly following the theological traditions established by Madhvacharya's Dvaita Vedanta.

=== Scriptural foundations ===
The theological basis of Gaudiya Vaishnavism is primarily the Bhagavad Gita and Bhagavata Purana (known within the tradition as the Srimad Bhagavatam), as interpreted by early followers of Chaitanya, such as Sanatana Goswami, Rupa Goswami, Jiva Goswami, Gopala Bhatta Goswami and others.

Gaudiya Vaishnava theology is extensively expounded by Jiva Goswami in his Sat-sandarbhas, six detailed treatises on various aspects of God. Other prominent theologians include his uncles, Rupa Gosvami, the author of Sri Bhakti-rasamrta-sindhu, and Sanatana Gosvami, (author of Hari-bhakti-vilasa), Visvanatha Chakravarti, (author of Sri Camatkara-candrika) and Baladeva Vidyabhushana (author of Govinda Bhashya).

Jiva Goswami wrote the Sat Sandarbhas as an analysis of the Bhagvata Purana to elaborate on Chaitanya Mahaprabhu's philosophy. The six treatises are:

- Tattva: Defines absolute reality, dealing with epistemology and ontology. Establishes the Bhagavata Purana as the supreme means of knowledge (pramana).
- Bhagavat: Elaborates on the nature of Bhagavan, the complete manifestation amongst the three aspects of absolute reality mentioned in Bhagavata Purana 1.2.11. Brahman, Paramatma, and Bhagavan are described as three aspects of the Absolute Reality as perceived by different types of spiritual aspirants.
- Paramatma: Describes Paramatma as a partial manifestation of Bhagavan.
- Krishna: Argues that Krishna is supreme
- Bhakti: Describes the process of attaining love for Krishna (bhakti or devotion). Outlines two types of bhakti: mixed and pure.
- Priti: Argues that priti (love) for Bhagavan is the highest goal (prayojana) of life

Jiva Gosvami frequently references Sridhara Swami throughout the quoting from Sridhara Swami's commentary on the Bhagavata Purana (Bhavartha-dipika). In the Catuhsutri section of the Paramatma-sandarbha, Jiva Gosvami references Ramanuja's commentary on the Brahma Sutras.

Chaitanya Vaishnava traditions regard the writings of previous acharyas in their respective lineage (sampradya) as authoritative interpretations of scripture. While schools such as Smartism and Advaitism encourage philosophically and metaphorically interpretation of scriptures literal reading, Chaitanya Vaishnavism emphasizes literal meaning (mukhya vṛitti) as primary and indirect meaning (gauṇa vṛitti) as secondary, following the principle: sākṣhād upadesas tu shrutih - "The instructions of the shruti-shāstra should be accepted literally, without fanciful or allegorical interpretations."

== Practices ==
=== Bhakti and devotional life ===
In Gaudiya Vaishnava theology, the practical process of performing devotional acts is described as bhakti or bhakti-yoga, supported by of nine different types activities . The two divisions of sadhana-bhakti (practice-based devotion) are vaidhi-bhakti and raganuga-bhakti. Rupa Goswami defines vaidhi-bhakti as that bhakti which is taken up not by natural liking but by consideration of scriptural injunctions. He describes the two categories of the highest bhakti as bhava-bhakti (devotion through intense emotion) and prema-bhakti (devotion of love). These two are essentially different intensities of the same participation in devotion via emotional expression. Raganuga-bhakti, in contrast, follows ragatmika-bhakti, the devotion present in Krishna's eternal associates, which is driven by raga (a natural absorption in the object of service.) Jiva Goswami's conclusion in Bhakti Sandarbha that raganuga-bhakti is the only viable pracess (abhidheya), recommended by the Bhagavatam. The goal of raganuga-bhakti is for the soul (jiva) to realize its true essential nature.

In his Siksastaka prayers, Chaitanya compares the process of bhakti-yoga to cleansing a dustty place, with human consciousness is the object in need of purification. This purification takes place largely through the chanting and singing of Radha and Krishna's names. Specifically, the Hare Krishna (mantra) is chanted and sung by practitioners on a daily basis, sometimes for many hours each day. Famously within the tradition, one of Chaitanya Mahaprabhu's close associates, Haridasa Thakur, is reported to have chanted 300,000 holy names of God each day.

=== Diet and lifestyle ===
Gaudiya Vaishnavas follow a vegetarian diet, abstaining from all types of animal flesh, fish and eggs. Onion and garlic are also avoided as they are believed to promote a tamasic and rajasic form of consciousness in the eater. Some Gaudiya Vaishnavas, mainly from ISKCON and Gaudiya Matha, also avoid the intake of caffeine, as they believe it is addictive and an intoxicant.

== Sampradaya and parampara ==
A Guru—shishya tradition ("lineage" or parampara) denotes a succession of teachers and disciples within some sampradaya (school, tradition). In accordance with the tradition, Gaudiya Vaishnavism as a subschool belongs to the Brahma Sampradaya, one of the four "orthodox" Vaishnavite schools. Chaitanya Mahaprabhu is said to be a disciple of Isvara Puri (fl. 14th century) who was a disciple of Madhavendra Puri (fl. 14th century) who was a disciple of Lakshmipati Tirtha (1420–1487) who was a disciple of Vyasatirtha (1469–1539) of the Madhva Sampradaya. The Gaudiya Vaishnavas call their tradition "Brahma-Madhva-Gaudiya Sampradaya", which originates from Brahma and has Madhvacharya as the original acharya and Chaitanya Mahaprabhu as the acharya-successor.

However, this traditional point is at least debatable. Some modern scholars and confessional authors critically assess and pair the Gaudiya Vaishnavism's affiliation with the Madhva tradition. For example, the famous American Indologist and historian of religion Guy L. Beck, with regard to the Chaitanya Sampradaya, notes the following historical events. The first time the Brahma-Madhva affiliation of Gaudiya Vaishnavism was propounded by Baladeva Vidyabhushana was in the 18th century. And to this day, there is no mention of Chaitanya in the annals of the Madhva Sampradaya. For secular scientists this means, originality and non-affiliation of Gaudiya Vaishnavism with other previous branches. At the same time, there is the consensus of scholars, that Chaitanya was initiated by the two gurus of a Vaishnava-oriented group within Adi Shankara's Dashanami order.

The Prameya Ratnawali of the above-mentioned gaudiya-acharya Baladeva Vidyabhushana contains the following canonical list of disciplic succession: Krishna, Brahma, Narada, Vyasa, Madhva, Padmanabha, Nrihari, Madhava, Akshobhya, Jayatirtha, Gyanasindhu, Dayanidhi, Vidyanidhi, Rajendra, Jayadharma, Purushottama, Brahmanya, Vyasatirtha, Lakshmipati Tirtha, Madhavendra Puri, Isvara Puri, and Chaitanya.

One feature of the Gaudiya succession of spiritual masters should be considered. Chaitanya refused to formally initiate anyone as a disciple, only inspiring and guiding his followers. Chaitanya neither founded the community nor named a successor. That is why, from the very beginning, the sampradaya was divided into several lines of succession that were practically not connected with each other and that still exist today. One of them, namely, the Gaudiya-Sarasvata Sampradaya, belongs to the well known International Society for Krishna Consciousness.

== History ==
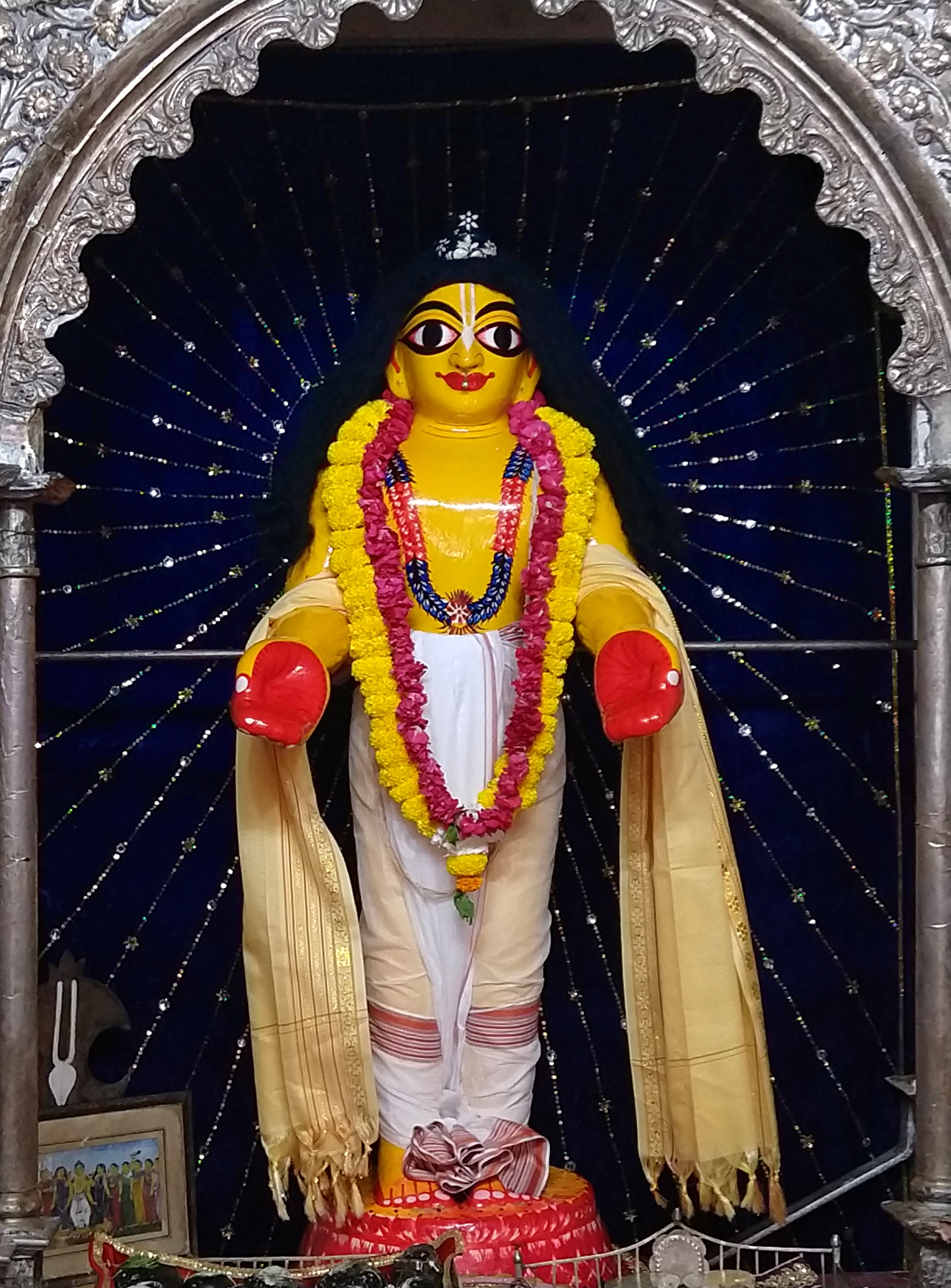
Wooden murti of Chaitanya Mahaprabhu as Dhāmeśvara, Nabadwip

=== Chaitanya Mahaprabhu ===
Chaitanya Mahaprabhu (also transliterated Caitanya, IAST Caitanya Mahāprabhu; 1486–1534) was a Bengali spiritual teacher who founded Gaudiya Vaishnavism. He is believed by his devotees to be Krishna himself who appeared in the form of His own devotee in order to teach the people of this world the process of Bhakti and how to attain the perfection of life. This they say with several evidences in scripture. Chaitanya Mahaprabhu is said to be a disciple of Isvara Puri who was a disciple of Madhavendra Puri who was a disciple of Lakshmipati Tirtha who was a disciple of Vyasatirtha (1469–1539) of Madhvacharya's Sampradaya.

Chaitanya Mahaprabhu is considered as the most merciful manifestation of Krishna. Chaitanya Mahaprabhu was the proponent for the Vaishnava school of Bhakti yoga (meaning loving devotion to God), based on Bhagavata Purana and Bhagavad Gita. Of various incarnations of Vishnu, he is revered as Krishna, popularised the chanting of the Hare Krishna mantra and composed the Siksastakam (eight devotional prayers) in Sanskrit. His followers, Gaudiya Vaishnavas, revere him as a Krishna with the mood and complexion of his source of inspiration Radha.

=== Early growth ===
Over the three centuries following the disappearance of Chaitanya Mahaprabhu, the Gaudiya Vaishnava tradition evolved into the form in which we largely find it today in contemporary India. In the early years of the tradition, the followers of Nityananda Prabhu, Advaita Acharya and other companions of Chaitanya Mahaprabhu educated and initiated people, each in their own locales across Bengal.

Chaitanya Mahaprabhu requested a select few among his followers, who later came to be known as the Six Gosvamis of Vrindavan, to systematically present his theology of bhakti in their writings. This theology emphasized the devotee's relationship to the Divine Couple, Radha and Krishna, and looked to Chaitanya as the embodiment of both Radha and Krishna. The six were Rupa Goswami, Sanatana Goswami, Gopala Bhatta Goswami, Raghunatha Bhatta Goswami, Raghunatha dasa Goswami and Jiva Goswami. In the second generation of the tradition, Narottama, Srinivasa and Shyamananda, three students of Jiva Goswami, the youngest among the six Goswamis, were instrumental in spreading the theology across Bengal and Orissa.

The festival of Kheturi (approx 1574), presided over by Jahnava Thakurani, the wife of Nityananda Rama, was the first time the leaders of the various branches of Chaitanya Mahaprabhu's followers assembled together. Through such festivals, members of the loosely organized tradition became acquainted with other branches along with their respective theological and practical nuances. That notwithstanding, the tradition has maintained its plural nature, having no central authority to preside over its matters. The festival of Kheturi allowed for the systemization of Gaudiya Vaishnava theology as a distinct branch of Vaishnava theology.

=== 17th–18th century ===
During the 17th–18th centuries, there was a period of general decline in the movement's strength and popularity, its "lethargic state", characterized by decreased public preaching and the rise of persons following and promoting tantric teachings and practices. These groups are called apasampradayas by the Chaitanyaits.

In the 17th century, Vishvanath Chakravarti Thakur held great merit in clarifying core doctrinal issues over the practice of raganuga-bhakti through works such as Raga-vartma-chandrika. His student Baladeva Vidyabhushan wrote a famous commentary on the Vedanta-sutra called Govinda Bhashya.

The 18th century saw a number of luminaries headed by Siddha Jayakrishna Das Babaji of Kamyavan and Siddha Krishnadas Babaji of Govardhan. The latter, a widely renowned teacher of the mode of internal worship (raga-bhajan) practiced in the tradition, is largely responsible for the current form of devotional practice embraced by some of the traditions based in Vrindavan.

==== Manipuri Vaishnavism ====
The "Manipuri Vaishnavism" is a regional form of Gaudiya Vaishnavism with a culture-forming role among the Meitei people in the north-eastern Indian state of Manipur. There, after a short period of Ramaism penetration, Gaudiya Vaishnavism spread in the early 18th century, especially from beginning its second quarter. Raja Gharib Nawaz (Pamheiba) was initiated into the Chaitanya tradition. Most devotee ruler and propagandist of Gaudiya Vaishnavism, under the influence of Narottama Dasa Thakura's disciples, was raja Bhagyachandra, who has visited the holy for the Chaytanyaits Nabadwip. Rasa Lila dance became a feature of the regional folk and religious tradition.

=== 20th century ===
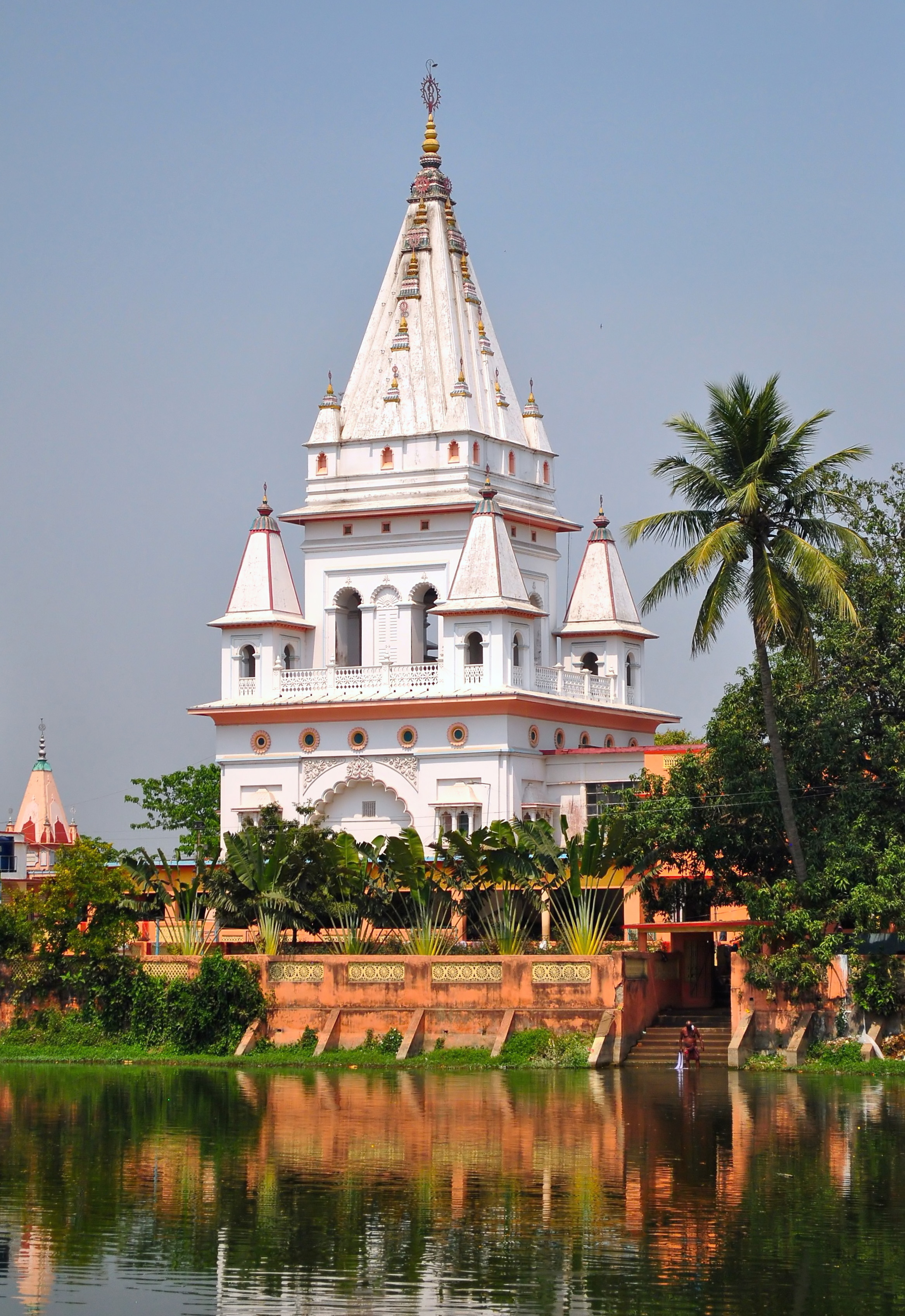
Yogapith temple at Chaitanya's birthsite in Mayapur established in 1880s by Bhaktivinoda Thakur, presently caretaken by the Sri Chaitanya Math

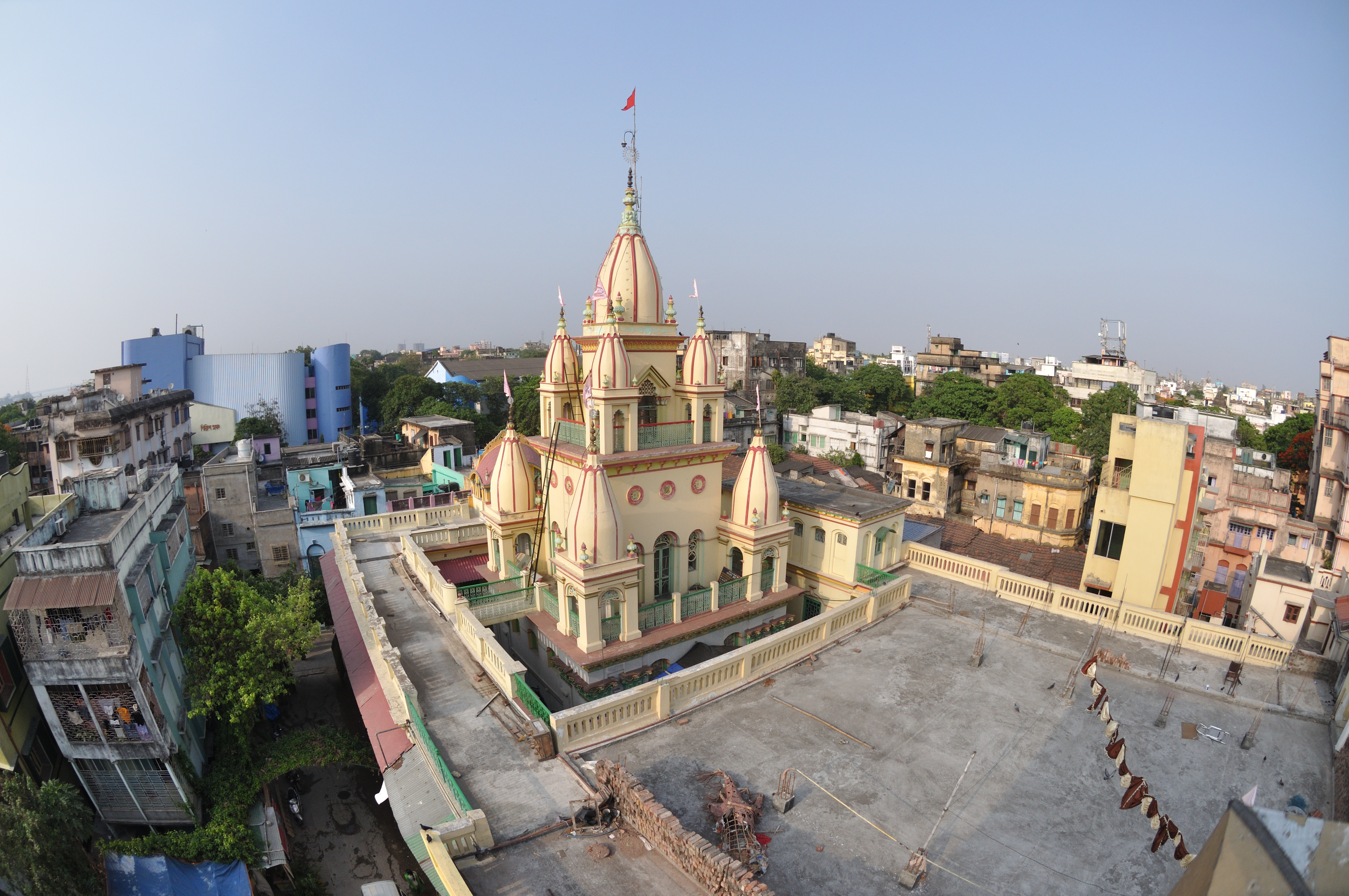
Sri Gaudiya Math (Kolkata, estd. 1930) is the formal headquarters of Gaudiya Math, now headquarter of Gaudiya Mission.

From the very beginning of Chaitanya's bhakti movement in Bengal, Haridasa Thakur and others Muslim by birth were the participants. This openness received a boost from Bhaktivinoda Thakur's broad-minded vision in the late 19th century, Baba Premananda Bharati's mission in the United States in the beginning of 20th century and was institutionalized by Bhaktisiddhanta Sarasvati Thakur in his Gaudiya Math in the 20th century.

A renaissance began at the start of the 20th century both in India and the West. One pioneer of the Gaudiya Vaishnavite mission in the West was Baba Premananda Bharati (1858–1914), author of Sree Krishna – the Lord of Love (1904) – the first full-length treatment of Gaudiya Vaishnavism in English, who, in 1902, founded the short-lived "Krishna Samaj" society in New York City and built a temple in Los Angeles. He belonged to the circle of adherents of the guru Prabhu Jagadbandhu with teachings similar to the later ISKCON mission. His followers formed several organizations including the now defunct Order of Living Service and the AUM Temple of Universal Truth.

The reform change of traditional caste Gaudiya Vaishnavism of 19th century is believed to have happened largely in India due to the efforts of a particularly adept preacher known as Bhaktivinoda Thakur, who also held the position of a deputy magistrate with the British government. Bhaktivinoda Thakur's son grew up to be both an eminent scholar and a highly influential Vaishnava preacher, and was later known as Bhaktisiddhanta Sarasvati. In 1920, Bhaktisiddhanta Sarasvati founded Gaudiya Math in India, and later sixty-four Gaudiya Matha monasteries in India, Burma and Europe. In 1933, the first European preaching center was established in London (London Glouster House, Cornwall Garden, W7 South Kensington) under the name "Gaudiya Mission Society of London".

Soon after Bhaktisiddhanta Sarasvati's death (1 January 1937), a dispute began, which divided the original Gaudiya Math mission into two administrative bodies still in existence today. In a settlement, they divided the sixty-four Gaudiya Math centers into two groups: the Sri Chaitanya Math headed by Bhakti Vilasa Tirtha Maharaj and the Gaudiya Mission headed by Ananta Vasudev (Bhakti Prasad Puri Maharaj).

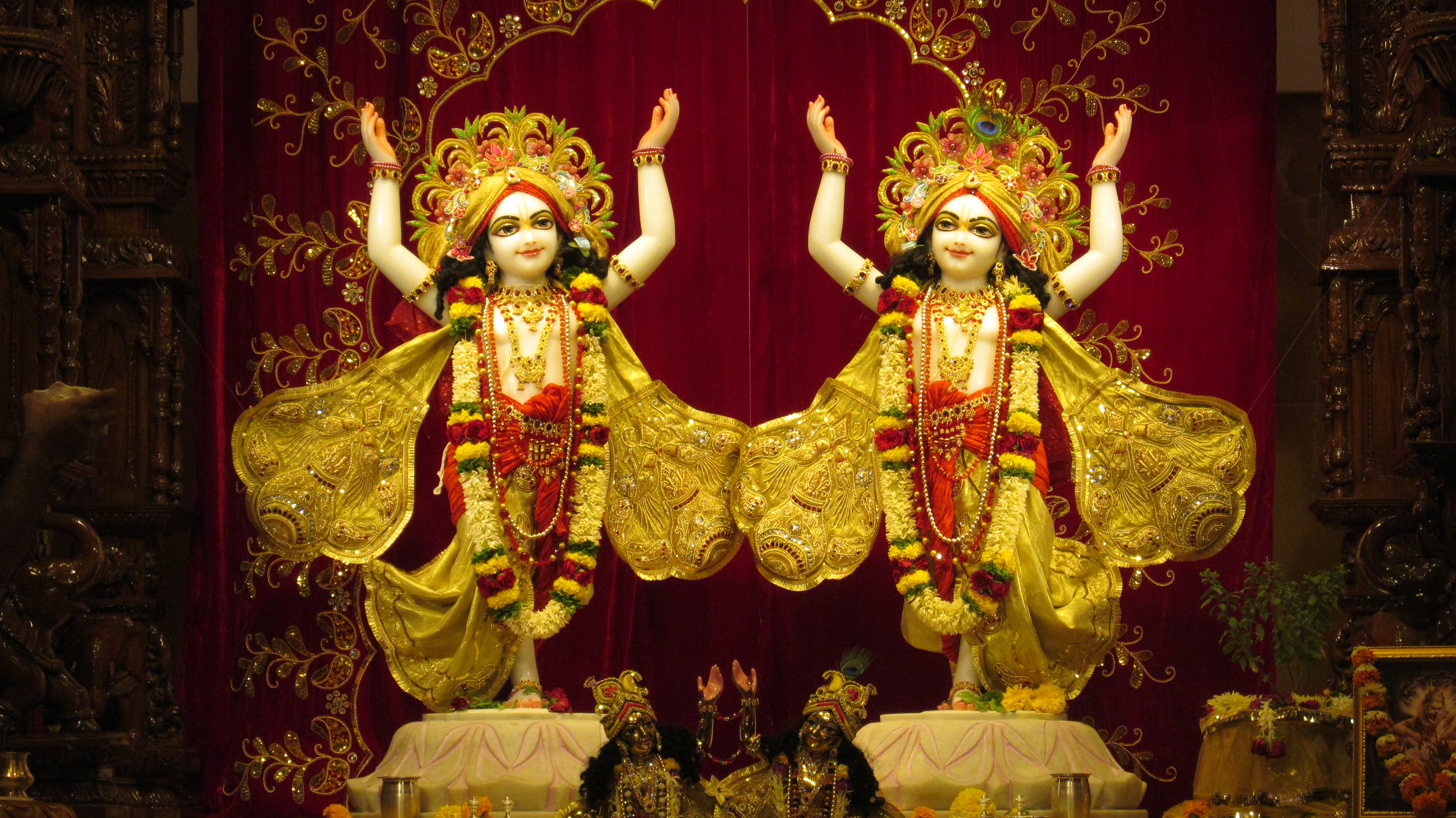
Vigrahas of Chaitanya Mahaprabhu and Nityananda prabhu at ISKCON Temple, Pune

Many of Bhaktisiddhanta Sarasvati's disciples disagreed with the spirit of these two factions and/or started their own missions to expand their guru's mission. In the 1960s, the one of his disciples, A. C. Bhaktivedanta Swami Prabhupada went to the West to spread Gaudiya-Vaishnavism and establish the International Society for Krishna Consciousness (ISKCON), "the most successful of the Gaudiya Math's offspring," an organization that continues today.

However, despite the active missionary work of the reformed Gaudiya Math and its followers, most of the Gaudiya Vaishnava community in India remained under the influence of hereditary brahmins-goswamis, who run famous old Gaudiya mandirs, as one example, the Radha Raman Temple in Vrindavan and its prominent scholar-acharya Shrivatsa Goswami.

== Gaudiya and other Vaishnava schools ==
Although sharing a common set of core beliefs, there are a number of philosophical differences which distinguish Gaudiya Vaishnavism from other Vaishnava schools:

- In Gaudiya Vaishnavism, Krishna is seen as the original form of God, i.e. the source of Vishnu and not as His avatar. This is based primarily on verse 1.3.28 of the Bhagavata Purana (krsnas tu bhagavan svayam) and other scriptures. This belief is shared by the Nimbarka and Vallabha sampradayas, but not by the Ramanuja and Madhva schools, who view Krishna as an avatar of Vishnu.
- As Krishna's consort, Radha is similarly viewed as the source of all other Shaktis, including Lakshmi and Sita.
- Chaitanya Mahaprabhu is worshiped as the most recent i.e. ninth avatar of Krishna to descend in the current yuga, or age. Other sampradayas view Chaitanya as a devotee of Krishna only, and not Krishna himself or a form of avatar. According to his biographies, Chaitanya did not display himself as Krishna in public, and would, in fact, avoid being addressed as such. In this regard A. C. Bhaktivedanta Swami states, "[When] addressed as Lord Krishna, He denied it. Indeed, He sometimes placed His hands over His ears, protesting that one should not be addressed as the Supreme Lord". However at times Chaitanya would exhibit a different mood and would welcome worship of himself as the Supreme Lord, and at a few occasions, is said to have exhibited his Universal form. Rupa Goswami, when first meeting with Chaitanya, composed the following verse showing his belief in Chaitanya Mahaprabhu's divinity:

"O most munificent incarnation! You are Krishna Himself appearing as Sri Krishna Caitanya Mahaprabhu. You have assumed the golden colour of Srimati Radharani, and You are widely distributing pure love of Krishna. We offer our respectful obeisances unto You."

Although this viewpoint outside of the Gaudiya tradition was disputed, Chaitanya's followers prove it by pointing at verses throughout the Puranic literatures as evidence to support this claim. Evidences such as the Krishna-varnam verse SB 11.5.32 have many interpretations by scholars, including Sridhara Svami who is accepted as authority by Mahaprabhu himself.

== Modern Gaudiya Vaishnava societies ==
The strictly centralized form of church-type organization and the idea that one has to be an unconventional (uttama) spiritual master introduced by the reformer Bhaktisiddhanta Sarasvati and his Gaudiya Math were not characteristic of the traditional Gaudiya Vaishnavism with its hereditary brahmins-goswamis and family teachers (kula gurus). Much of the Gaudiya Vaishnava community in India remained committed to the unreformed and loosely organized tradition. Many modern organisations are independent branches of the tree of the Gaudiya Math.

Gaudiya Math and offshoots

- Gaudiya Mission established by Ananta Vasudev Prabhu alias Srila Bhakti Prasad Puri (1940)
- Gaudiya Vedanta Samiti established by Bhakti Prajnan Keshava (1940)
- Sri Chaitanya Saraswat Math established by Bhakti Rakshak Sridhar (1941)
- Sri Guru Prapanna Ashram established by Patitpavan Gosvami Thakura(1952)
- International Society for Krishna Consciousness established by A. C. Bhaktivedanta Swami Prabhupada (1966)
- Science of Identity Foundation established by Siddhaswarupananda Paramahamsa (1977)
- Sri Sri Radha Govindaji Trust established by Bhakti Hridaya Bon (1979)
- Sri Caitanya Sangha, a.k.a. Gaudiya Vaishnavite Society, established by Tripurari Swami (1985)
- The Vaishnava Foundation, established by Kailasa Candra dasa & Eric Johanson (1986)
- ISKCON Revival Movement (2000)
- Bhakta Bandhav (2010) Disciples of Srila Bhaktivedanta Narayan Goswami Maharaj

Traditional Gaudiya societies

- Sri Caitanya Prema Samsthana, established by Shrivatsa Goswami (1972)

Many of branches of the Gaudiya Math (not all) are members of the World Vaisnava Association – Visva Vaisnava Raj Sabha (WVA–VVRS), which had been established in 1994 by some Gaudiya leaders. But after this establishment, there is little real cooperation among Gaudiya organisations.

=== Demography ===
There are adherents of Gaudiya Vaishnavism in all strata of Indian society, but a tendency has been revealed, Bengali Vaishnavas belong to the lower middle castes ("middle class"), while the upper castes as well as lowest castes and tribes in Bengal are Shaktas.

== Offshoots of Gaudiya Vaishnavism ==
There are Krishnaite gurus and groups who belong to the Chaitanya lineage, but actually separated from Gaudiya Vaishnavism, becoming new independent movements.

- Mahanam Sampradaya, inspired by Prabhu Jagadbandhu

== See also ==
- 108 names of Krishna
- Achintya Bheda Abheda
- Bhagavata
- Cataphatic theology
- Gaudiya Math
- List of 21st-century religious leaders#Gaudiya Vaishnavism
- Manipuri Vaishnavism
- Turiya
