= Gaudiya Math =

Hindu organisation

Sri Gaudiya Math
- গৌড়ীয় মঠ
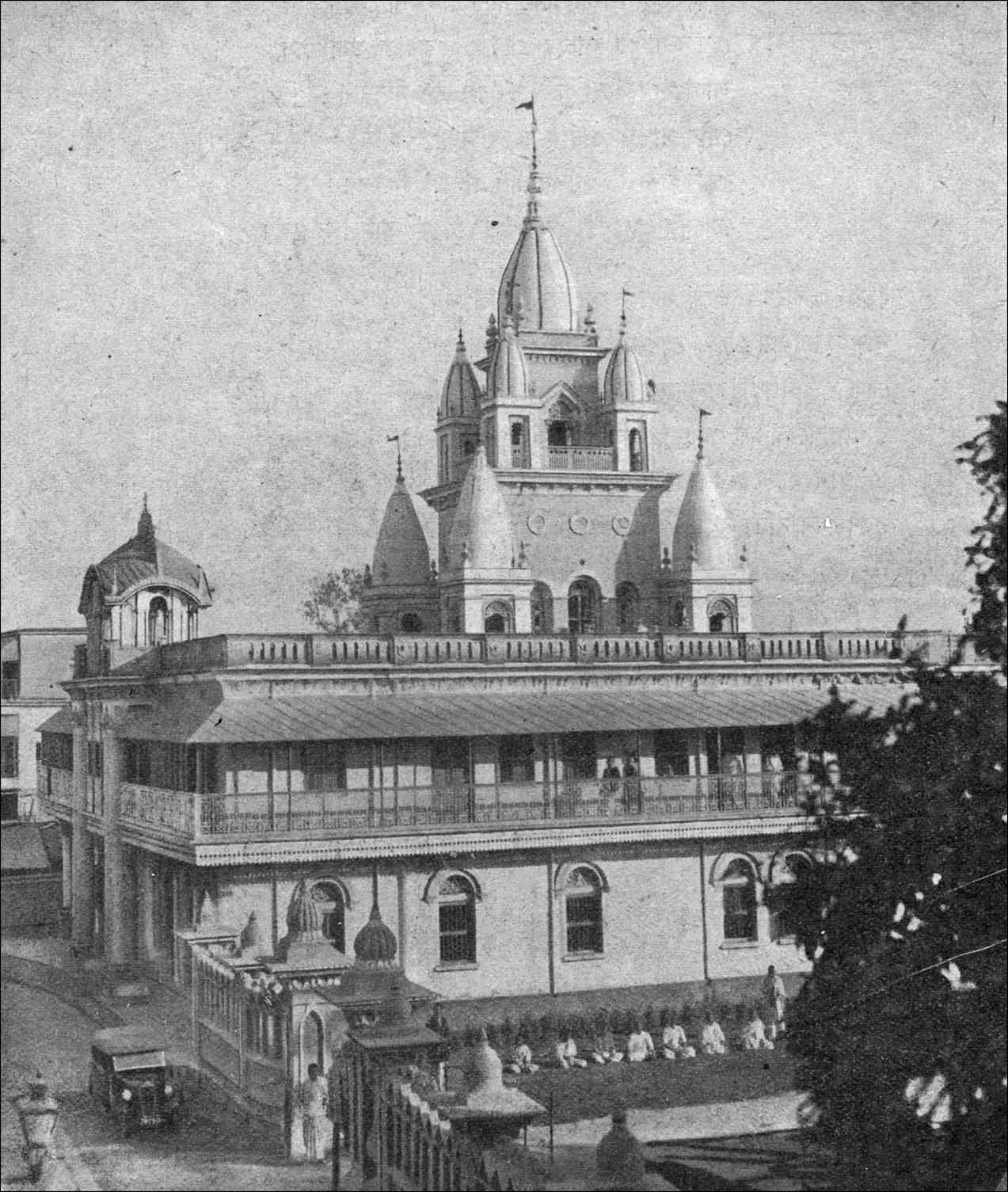
- Sri Gaudiya Math, Bagbazar, Kolkata
- Successor: Gaudiya Mission and Sri Chaitanya Math
- Established: 16 September 1920 (106 years ago)
- Founder: Bhaktisiddhanta Sarasvati
- Founded at: Calcutta, British India
- Dissolved: 1937; 89 years ago
- Type: Religious organization
- Purpose: Educational, Philanthropic, Religious studies, Spirituality
- Headquarters: Calcutta, British India
- Location: 64 centers
- Region served: British India; British Burma; London, UK; Berlin, Germany
- Official languages: Bengali, English
- Affiliations: Gaudiya Vaishnavism

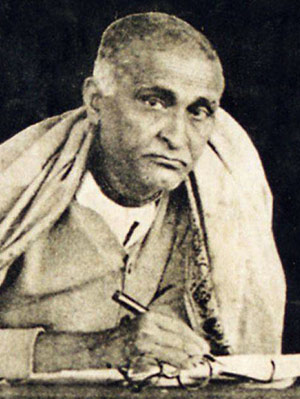
Bhaktisiddhanta Sarasvati, the founder of Gaudiya Math.

The Gaudiya Math (/mʌt/, /mɑːt/; Gauḍīya Maṭha) is a Gaudiya Vaishnava matha (monastic organisation) formed on 6 September 1920, about 30 months after Bhaktisiddhanta Sarasvati took sannyasa, the renounced order of life. On 7 March 1918, the same day he took sannyasa, he established the Sri Chaitanya Math in Mayapura in West Bengal, later recognised as the parent body of all the Gaudiya Math branches. Its purpose was to spread Gaudiya Vaishnavism, the philosophy of the medieval Vaisnava saint Chaitanya Mahaprabhu, through preaching and publishing.

From the beginning of Chaitanya's bhakti movement in Bengal, devotees, including Haridasa Thakur and others, whether Muslim or Hindu by birth, have been participants. This openness and disregard for the traditional caste received a boost from the "broad-minded vision" of Bhaktivinoda Thakura, a nineteenth-century magistrate and prolific writer on bhakti topics, and was institutionalised by his son and successor Bhaktisiddhanta Sarasvati Thakura in the twentieth-century Gaudiya Math.

== Branches ==
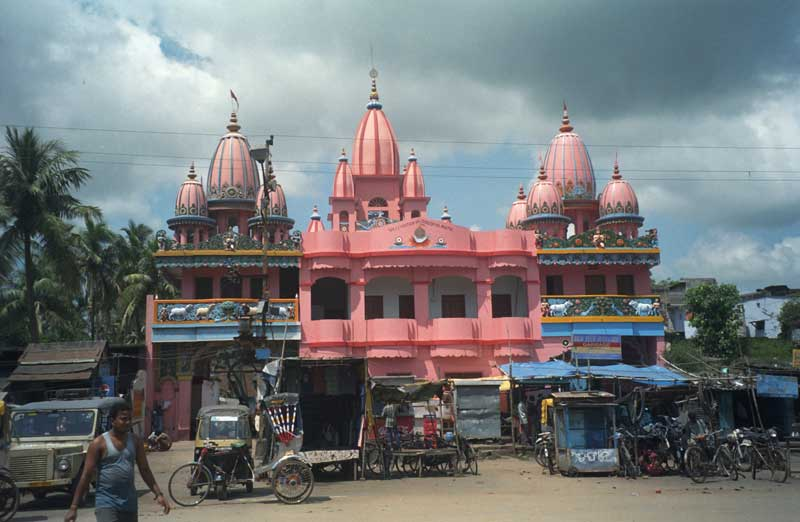
The Gauduya Math branch in Puri, Odisha.

The Gaudiya Math had established 64 branches. Most were in India, but preaching centres were maintained for a time in British Burma, England and Germany. The first European preaching center was established in London in 1933 (London Glouster House, Cornwall Garden, W7 South Kensington) under the name Gaudiya Mission Society of London'. Lord Zetland, the English Secretary of State, was the president of this society. The second European preaching center was opened by Swami B.H. Bon Maharaj in Berlin (W30 Eisenacherstr. 29).

== History ==
Bhaktisiddhanta Saraswati Prabhupada inaugurated the first center of his institution in Calcutta, later known as the Gaudiya Math. Registered on 5 February 1919, Bhaktisiddhanta Sarasvati's missionary movement was initially called Vishva Vaishnava Raj Sabha, in the name of the society founded by Bhaktivinoda. It soon became known as the Gaudiya Math after the Calcutta branch and his weekly Bengali magazine Gaudiya. The Gaudiya Math published material on religious, philosophical and social issues through its periodical publications in English, Bengali, Assamese, Odia, and Hindi. These publications included the daily Bengali newspaper Nadiya Prakash, the weekly magazine Gaudiya, and the monthly English and Sanskrit magazine The Harmonist (Shri Sajjana-toshani). The Gaudiya Math's outreach programs found support in urban areas, where supporters contributed to the construction of new temples and "theistic exhibitions" – public expositions on the Gaudiya Vaishnava philosophy using displays and dioramas.

It soon developed into a dynamic missionary and educational institution with sixty-four branches across India and three centres abroad (in Burma, Germany, and England). The Math propagated the teachings of Gaudiya Vaishnavism by means of daily, weekly, and monthly periodicals, books of the Vaishnava canon, and public programs as well as through "theistic exhibitions" with dioramas.

During 1919-1937, the Gaudiya Math leadership consisted mainly of educated Bengalis and eighteen sannyasis who were sent to establish the movement in new places in India, and later, in Europe. Its growing ashrama residents hub, however, included disciples from both educated urban and simple rural milieus. Householder disciples and sympathizers supported the temples with funds, food, and volunteer labour. The Gaudiya Math centres emphasized the individual discipline of their residents, including mandatory ascetic vows and daily practice of devotion (bhakti) centred on individual recitation (japa) and public singing (kirtan) of Krishna's names, regular study of philosophical and devotional texts (svadhyaya), traditional worship of temple images of Krishna and Chaitanya (archana) as well as attendance at lectures and seminars (shravanam).

Soon after the Srila Bhaktisiddhanta Saraswati's death (1 January 1937), a dispute began and the original Gaudiya Math mission divided by the court in 1948 into two administrative bodies which continued preaching on their own, up to the present day. In a settlement they divided the 64 Gaudiya Math centers into two groups. Sri Chaitanya Math Branch were headed by Srila Bhakti Vilasa Tirtha Maharaj. Gaudiya Mission were headed by Ananta Vasudev Prabhu, who became known as Srila Bhakti Prasad Puri Maharaj after accepting sannyasa for short duration.

Many of the disciples of Bhaktisiddhanta Sarasvati did not agree with the spirit of these newly created two fractions, or were simply inspired to expand the mission of their guru on their own enthusiasm, started their own missions. Many of these autonomous missions are still known as Gaudiya Math. Some of the other notable new missions are:

- Sri Gaudiya Vedanta Samiti established by Bhakti Prajnan Keshava Maharaj and Bhakti Rakshak Sridhar Goswami Maharaj (1940)
- Sri Chaitanya Saraswat Math established by Bhakti Rakshak Sridhar Maharaj (1941)
- Sri Chaitanya Gaudiya Math established by Srila Bhakti Dayita Madhav Goswami Maharaj (1953)
- International Society for Krishna Consciousness established by A. C. Bhaktivedanta Swami Prabhupada (1966)
- Sri Krishna Chaitanya Mission established by Srila Bhakti Vaibhava Puri Goswami Maharaj (1966)
- Science of Identity Foundation established by Siddhaswarupananda Paramahamsa (1977)
- Sri Sri Radha Govindaji Trust established by Srila Bhakti Hridaya Bon (1979)
- Sri Caitanya Sangha, a.k.a. Gaudiya Vaishnavite Society, established by Tripurari Swami (1985)
- Sri Gopinatha Gaudiya Math established by Srila Bhakti Pramode Puri Goswami Maharaj (1989)

Some are very large missions, and some are smaller branches started by individual Vaishnavas. What they hold in common is that they are autonomous branches of the tree of the Gaudiya Math. Almost all of them have published books and periodicals and opened one or more temples. There is little cooperation among these missions. Nevertheless, in 1994 many of them formed united the World Vaisnava Association — Visva Vaisnava Raj Sabha (WVA–VVRS).

== Sources ==
- Goswami, Tamal Krishna; Schweig, Graham M. (concluding chapters) (2012), A living theology of Krishna Bhakti: The essential teachings of A.C. Bhaktivedanta Swami Prabhupada, New York, NY: Oxford University Press, ISBN 978-0-19-979663-2
- Sardella, Ferdinando (2013a), Jacobsen, Knut A. (ed.), Brill's encyclopedia of Hinduism (Volume 5 ed.), Leiden, NL; Boston, US: Brill, pp. 415–423, ISBN 978-90-04-17896-0
- Sardella, Ferdinando (2013b), Modern Hindu Personalism: The History, Life, and Thought of Bhaktisiddhanta Sarasvati (reprint ed.), New York, NY: Oxford University Press, ISBN 978-0199865901
