= Bhakti Hridaya Bon =

Indian writer (1901–1982)

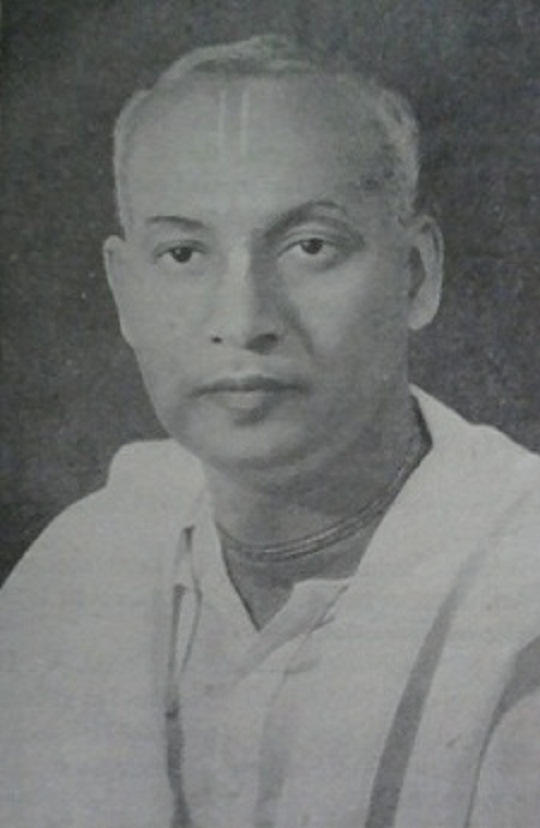

Personal life
- Born: 23 March 1901 Baharpur, Bengal Presidency, British Raj
- Died: 7 July 1982 (aged 81) Vrindavan, Uttar Pradesh, India
- Notable work(s): My First Year in England and others

Religious life
- Religion: Hinduism
- Founder of: Sri Sri Radha Govindaji Trust and Institute of Oriental Philosophy
- Philosophy: Achintya Bheda Abheda
- Sect: Gaudiya Vaishnavism

Religious career
- Teacher: Bhaktisiddhanta Sarasvati Thakura
- Disciples: Sadananda, Walther Eidlitz, Rasikananda Bon, Gopananda Bon and others

Bhakti Hridaya Bon (Sanskrit: भक्ति हृदय वन, IAST: Bhakti Hṛdaya Vana), also known as Swami Bon (Baharpur, 23 March 1901 – Vrindavan, 7 July 1982), was a disciple of Bhaktisiddhanta Sarasvati and a guru in the Gaudiya Math following the philosophy of bhakti, specifically that of Caitanya Mahaprabhu and Gaudiya Vaishnava theology. At the time of his death, he left behind thousands of Bengali disciples in India.

Reference books on Bon's life include My First Year in England, On the path to Vaikuntha, Vaikunther Pathe (in Bengali), and Viraha-vedana (in Bengali). He is noted for his translation into English of Rupa Goswami's Sanskrit classic, Bhakti-rasamrita-sindhu; as well as his educational activities in Vraja Mandala, considered a sacred area associated with Krishna, located between Delhi and Agra in Uttar Pradesh, India.

Swami Bon was the rector of the Institute of Oriental Philosophy in Vrindavan, and founder of Sri Krishna Chaitanya Primary School in Nandagram, Mathura district, Uttar Pradesh. He initiated a few Westerners, such as Asim Krishna Das (Allan A. Shapiro); Lalitananda Bon (Richard Shaw Brown); and Vamana dasa (Walther Eidlitz), who was converted to Gaudiya Vaishnavism by meeting Sadananda in a religious gathering in India.

== Early life ==
Born Narendra Nath Mukherji in 1901 in Bengal to the Gaudiya Vaishnava Brahmana and Brahmarishi Rajanikanta, who was a Vedic scholar, Bon was a lifelong celibate and, as a brahmacari, he joined Bhaktisiddhanta Sarasvati Thakura and took initiation in the early 1900s.

In 1924, at the age of 23, he was the third disciple to accept lifelong Tridanda Sannyasa from Bhaktisiddhanta Sarasvati Thakura Prabhupada and quickly became one of his leading preachers. He preached the message of Caitanya Mahaprabhu, delivering many lectures all over India, including at the Royal Albert Hall in Kolkata. He also established a new Gaudiya Math in Madras (now Chennai), and he organised successful theistic exhibitions in Kolkata and Dacca.

He was so successful as a preacher, introducing the message of Sarasvati Prabhupada and Chaitanya up to the highest levels of social and intellectual society of that time (during the British Raj), that he soon became known all over India. Due to his caste and high education, he was sent by his guru, Bhaktisiddhanta Sarasvati Prabhupada, to the UK and Germany to preach. He took Chaitanya's teachings to the very top of society, even being received in audience by the King of England, and gave many lectures throughout England and continental Europe. During this trip, Bon converted two German men, E.G. Schulze (Sadananda) and Baron Koeth, whom he brought back to his guru, Sarasvati Prabhupada, for initiation. In 1942, after the disappearance of his guru, Sarasvati Prabhupada, Bon voted for Bhakti Vilas Tirtha to be the next Acharya of the Gaudiya Math.

== Tapasya ==
Bon went by foot on a solitary pilgrimage into the Himalayas for years of severe penances, described in his Bengali-language book Vaikunther-pathe (On the way to Vaikuntha). His vows were (1) not speaking to anyone, (2) eating only fruits and nuts off of trees, (3) sleeping bare-bodied on the ground, and (4) not taking a single step without chanting the Maha-mantra. He journeyed 650 miles on foot and lived at the source of the Yamuna River under very severe circumstances. In his book he writes about his vision (darshan) of his Gurudeva, who revealed to him his siddha-bhajan-pranali, and ordered him to go serve Vrindavana-dhama. Thereafter, he retired in Vrindavan, where he constructed a small Bhajana Kutir on land donated to him. He also excavated a cave-room where he spent many years performing secluded bhajan (chanting in meditation).

== Later life ==
By the age of 70, Bon had initiated over one thousand mostly Bengali and other Indian-born disciples, including ten Tridandi Sannyasis (monks). In some East and West Bengali villages such as Vishnupur, the entire populations, husbands, wives and children, were his disciples. Bon lived in Vrindavan in his ashram, "Bhajan Kutir." He was active in attracting scholars and other people to Vraja Dham for theological studies, as well as creating a post-graduate college in Vrindavan, the Institute of Oriental Philosophy (affiliated with the state Dr. Bhimrao Ambedkar University), where many local people received their education. He also founded the Sri Krishna Chaitainya Primary School in Nandagram in 1970. He spent much of his time associating with his close friends and godbrothers, such as "bhajananandi" Krishnadas Babaji, and Bhakti Shuddha Ashram.

== Sri Sri Radha Govindaji Trust ==
In addition to his main residence, Bhajan Kutir in Vrindavan (now a temple and his samadhi were built at its garden), Swami Bon also founded 3 temples-ashrams in Nandagram, South Kolkata, and Hingalganj, West Bengal. In 1979 to manage them and the Institute of Oriental Philosophy he established the Sri Sri Radha-Govindaji Trust (easier, "Radha Govinda Trust"), religious and educational organization, still in force. His current acarya successor is Gopananda Bon, a disciple of Swami Bon, which is also the president of the named Institute and the World Vaishnava Association (WVA).

== Death ==
He died in the company of chanting disciples at 9:04 PM on 7 July 1982 at his Bhajan Kutir in Vrindavan, Uttar Pradesh. The story of his death is reported in the book Supreme Divinity and Sad-guru by Tapodhir Krishna Dastidar.

== Sources ==
- Bharati, Agehananda (February 1968). "Review of Bhakti-Rasamrta-Sindhuh by Sri Rupa Gosvami". The Journal of Asian Studies. 27 (2): 412–3. doi:10.2307/2051795. JSTOR 2051795.
- B.H. Bon Maharaj. IPC 18, 1973: 200261. ... 3.455: B.H. Bon Maharaj, "Life and message of Sri Caitanya", IPC 17, 1972
- B.H. Bon Maharaj (1972). "The Life and Message of Sri Caitanya". In Bleeker, C.J. (ed.). Ex Orbe Religionum. Studia Geo Widengren Oblata. Lugduni Batavorum.
- Pearson, Birger A. (June 1973). "Comparative History of Religion [review of Ex Orbe Religionum: Studia Geo Widengren Oblata by C.J. Bleeker]". Journal of the American Academy of Religion. 41 (2): 296. doi:10.1093/jaarel/XLI.2.296. JSTOR 1461441. "S. B. H. Bon Mahārāj presents some interesting material on Śrī Caitanya, a 15th-century holy man and philosopher."
