= Sadananda Das =

Indian Guruji

Swami Sadananda Das (Sanskrit: स्वामी सदानन्द दास, IAST: Svāmī Sadānanda dāsa; born 1908 as Ernst-Georg Schulze in Germany, died 1977) was a German-Indian guru. He was one of the first known individuals who was not of Asian origin to embrace the Gaudiya Vaishnava tradition. His teacher was Swami Bhakti Hridaya Bon, a disciple of Hindu spiritual reformer Bhaktisiddhanta Sarasvati Thakura. Sadananda received diksa or formal initiation into the Gaudiya Vaishnava tradition through Swami Bon from Sarasvati, and later received the name Sadananda Das by Sarasvati directly after he had joined the Gaudiya Mission in Calcutta, India.

== Life of Svami Sadananda Dasa ==
Sadananda was born in Germany in 1908. In the early 1930s, he became a disciple of Shrila Bhaktisiddhanta Sarasvati, a prominent guru and spiritual reformer of Gaudiya Vaishnavism in the early 20th century in India. First, though, Sadananda came in contact with Swami Hridaya Bon Maharaja, a disciple of Bhaktisiddhanta, when the latter visited The State Picture Gallery in Berlin, Germany, in 1933 during his missionary activities in Europe. In 1934 Sadananda then moved to London, where the Indian monks of the Gaudiya Mission had established a centre, and where he soon, in the name of Bhaktisiddhanta Sarasvati, became initiated by Swami Hridaya Bon Maharaja and Swami Bhakti Pradip Tirtha Maharaja. In 1935, he eventually travelled with Swami Bon to India, where Sarasvati gave him his spiritual name Sadananda Das. After his guru's death in 1937, Sadananda worked independently of organizations, devoting himself to study the holy texts of the Hindus.

While travelling through India from the Himalayas to the very South and back between 1938 and 1939, Sadananda met several saints, scholars and travellers. Among those was the indologist, anthroposophist, author and Far East traveler Hans-Hasso Veltheim-Ostrau who reports their meeting 1938 in the Himalayas in his diaries from that time. In February 1939, during Sadananda's travels through South India, he met the saint Swami Ramdas in his Ashram in Kanhangad, Kerala. Ramdas mentions this meeting in his work "In the Vision of God" and describes him as follows: "Sadhu Sadananda had been, it appears a Professor in a German University and was a man of great learning and attainments. But he was found to be very simply in his nature and his ways. In fact, we loved him at first sight."

During the Second World War (1939-1945) Sadananda was held in a British internment camp in Dehra Dun, India, where he met the Austrian poet Walther Eidlitz (Vamandas), who in the course of their imprisonment became his good friend and disciple. Eidlitz recounts these events in his autobiographical work "Unknown India". In 1954, Sadananda received sannyasa, i.e. he entered the stage of a mendicant, from Swami Satyabastabya Brajabasi (Baraswami), who belonged to the Gaudiya Math in Benares, becoming Swami Sadananda Das. In 1961 Sadananda returned to Europe. There he stayed until his demise in 1977, teaching bhakti yoga to a small circle of Swedish, German and Swiss friends and translating Vaishnava texts from Sanskrit and Bengali into German. He thereby assisted his disciple Walther Eidlitz with his publications, lectures and courses. Their main common work is Walther Eidlitz' book on Krishna Caitanya for which Sadananda provided the translations from the Sanskrit and Bengali sources.

== Works by Svami Sadananda Dasa ==
- Svami Sadananda Dasa (2014): Krishna’s Damodara Lila. Rendering based on passages from the Shrimad-Bhagavatam, Gopala-Campuh and Ananda-Vrindavana-Campuh. Translated into English by Kid Samuelsson and Bengt Lundborg from Svami Sadananda Dasa’s German original "Die Damodara-Lila Krishna’s".
- Svami Sadananda Dasa (2015): Tender as a Flower – Hard as a Thunderbolt. Words of Truth and Love. Into English by Kid Samuelsson, Bengt Lundborg and Katrin Stamm.
- Svami Sadananda Dasa (1935): "Sunder Warumbe". The Harmonist. Vol. XXXII, No. 7, pp. 154–167.
- Svami Sadananda Dasa (1936): "Society – Community – Math". The Harmonist. Vol. XXXII. No.14, pp. 329–332.
- Svami Sadananda Dasa (1936): "Sub specie aeternitatis – Spiritual View". The Harmonist, Vol. XXXII, No. 15, pp. 343–351.
- Svami Sadananda Dasa (1936): "Buddhism – Philosophy or Religion". The Harmonist. Vol. XXXII. No. 16, pp. 361–368, 385-390.
