= Prabhupada (disambiguation) =

Prabhupada or Prabhupad is a Bengali word, derived from Sanskrit, used as an honorary title before or after the name of some Vaishnava religious teachers. Literally the word Prabhupada means "Lord's Feet" or "Lotus Feet".

Prabhupada is the name of the following Hindu religious teachers:

- Chaitanya Mahaprabhu (1486–1534)
- Rupa Goswami or Rupa Goswami Prabhupada (1489–1564)
- Bhaktisiddhanta Sarasvati (1874–1937), leader of the Gaudiya Math
- A. C. Bhaktivedanta Swami Prabhupada (1896–1977), used as an honorific for the founder of ISKCON by his followers.
