= Sri Devananda Gaudiya Math =

Hindu organisation and monastery

- श्री देवानंद गौडीय मठ, শ্রী দেবানন্দ গৌড়ীয় মঠ
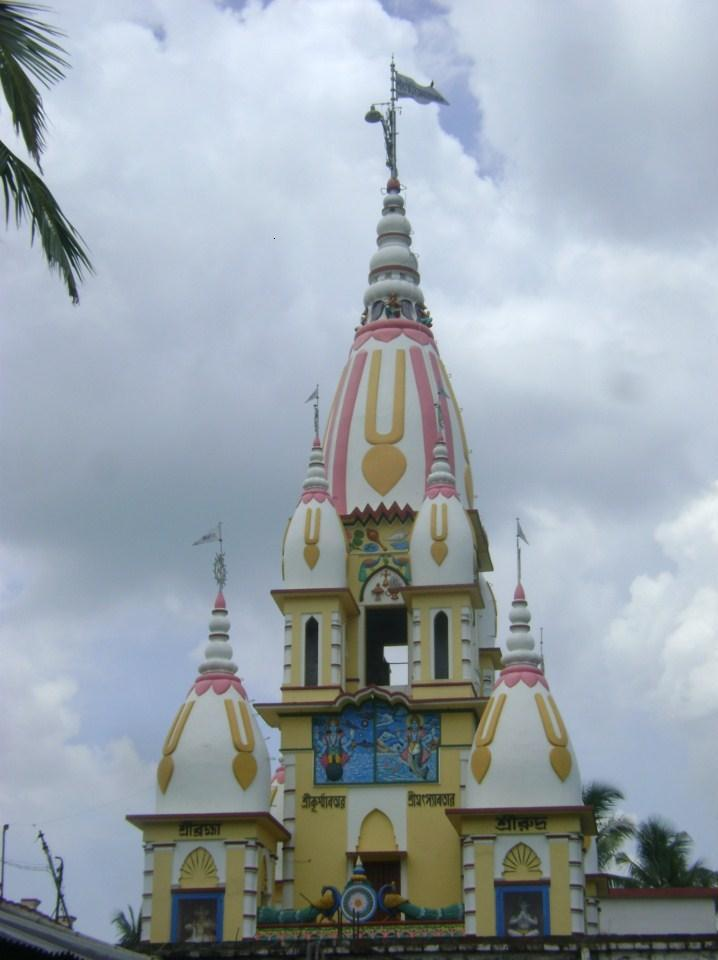
- The Spire of Sri Devananda Gaudiya Math, Nabadwip, West Bengal

Religion
- Affiliation: Hinduism
- District: Nadia
- Deity: Sri Gauranga, Radha Vinod Bihari Jiu, Lakshmi Varahadev, Jagannath Dev, Bhakti Siddhanta Saraswati Prabhupad, Bhakti Prajnana Keshav Goswami Thakur, Bhakti Vedanta Baman Goswami Maharaj
- Festivals: Dolyatra, Ratha Yatra, Jhulan-Janmashtami, Bhakti Prajnan Keshav Goswami Maharaj and Bhakti Vedanta Vaman Goswami Maharaj's Vyas Puja & Tirobhav Mahotsav

Location
- Location: Teghori Pada
- State: West Bengal
- Country: India
- Interactive map of Sri Devananda Gaudiya Math
- Coordinates: 23.3976678°N 88.3629921°E

Architecture
- Type: Hindu temple architecture
- Creator: Srila Bhakti Prajnana Kesava Gosvami Maharaja
- Completed: 1940

Website
- www.facebook.com/SrilaGurudeva

Sri Devananda Gaudiya Math (also Matha, or Mutt) is situated at Teghori Pada in Nabadwip dham of Nadia district in the state of West Bengal, India, and is a matha and prominent holy place of the Gaudiya Vaishnavas and the headquarters of the Sri Gaudiya Vedanta Samiti. It is in the middle of the place formerly known as Koladvipa. It receives thousands of devotees every year.

== Gaudiya Vedanta Samiti ==
The Sri Gaudiya Vedanta Samiti or Gaudiya Vedanta Samiti (GVS) is the one of oldest Gaudiya Vaishnava missionary and monastic organisations, established in 1940 in British India. It was founded by Bhakti Prajnan Keshava.

== Gallery ==
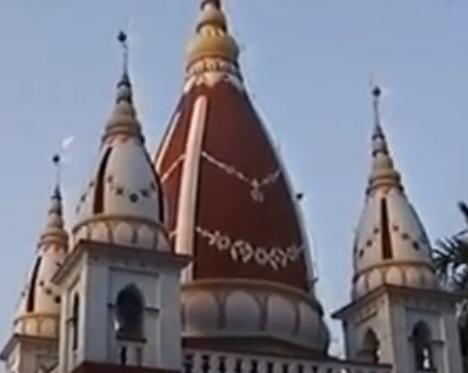
The dome of Sri Devananda Gaudiya Math.

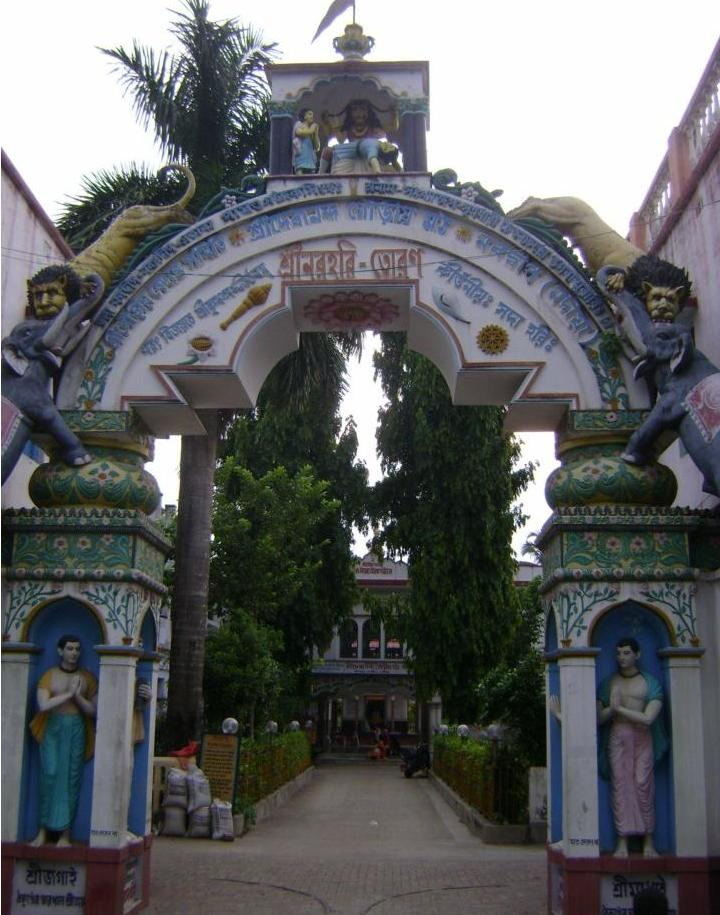
The entrance (torana) of Sri Devananda Gaudiya Math.

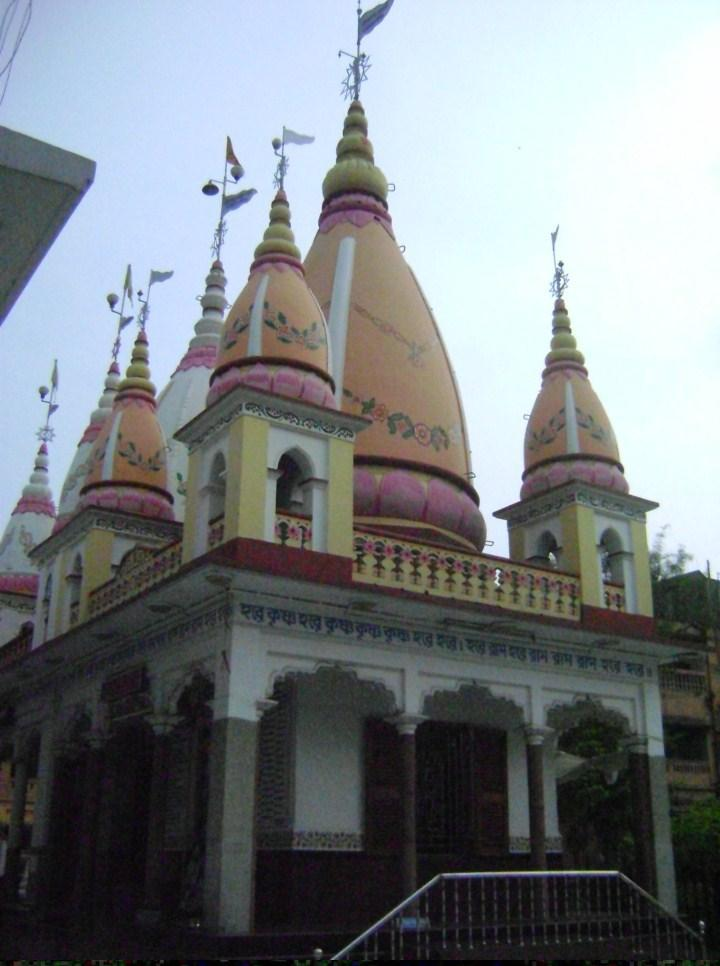
Samadhi Mandir of Srila Bhakti Prajnana Kesava Gosvami Maharaja and Srila Bhakti Vedanta Bamana Goswami Maharaja.

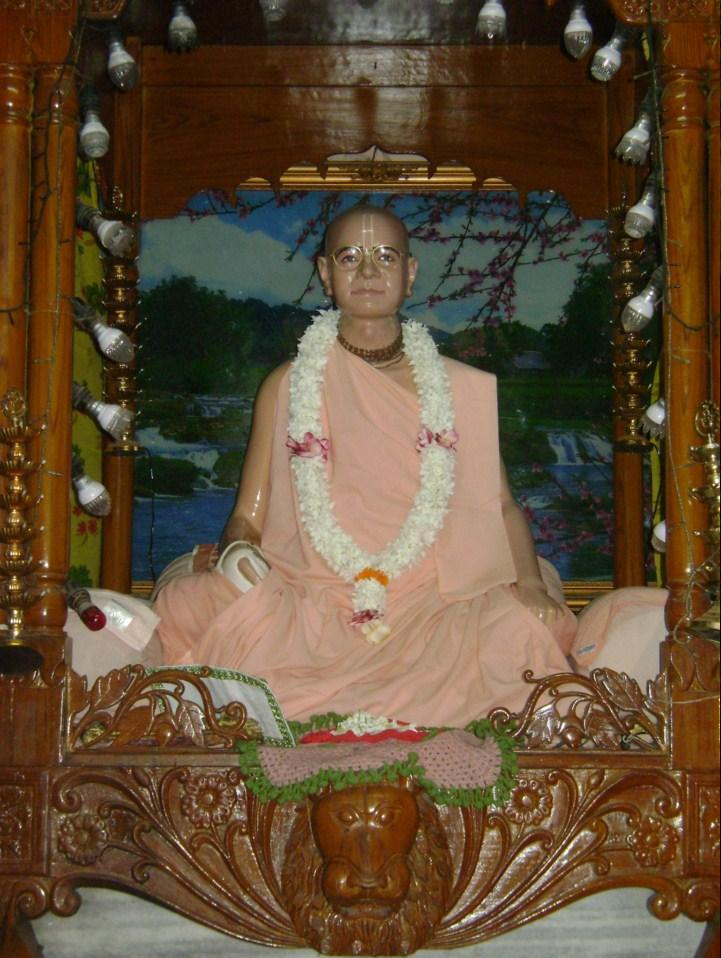
Samadhi of Srila Bhakti Prajnana Kesava Gosvami Maharaja.

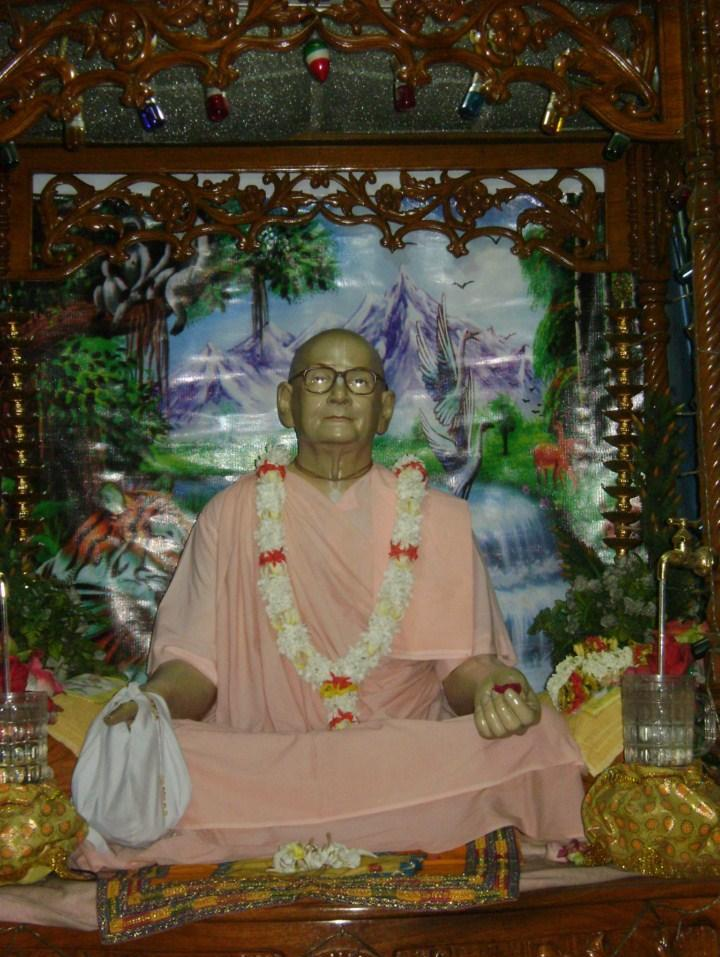
Samadhi of Srila Bhakti Vedanta Bamana Goswami Maharaja.

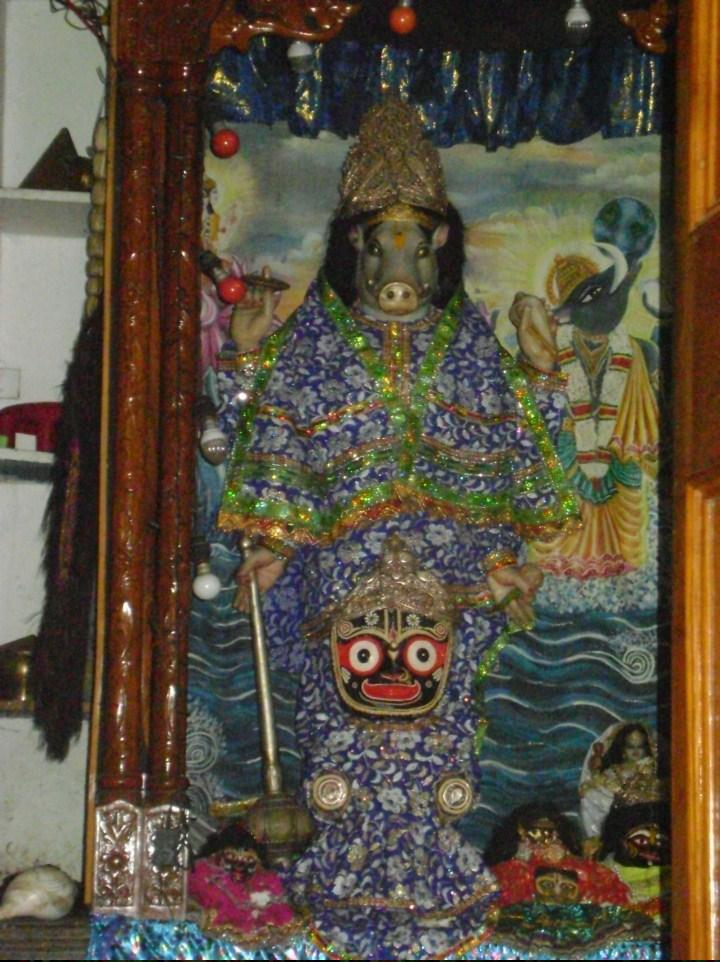
Sri Koladeva, or Varahadeva, the presiding deity of Sri Koladvipa.

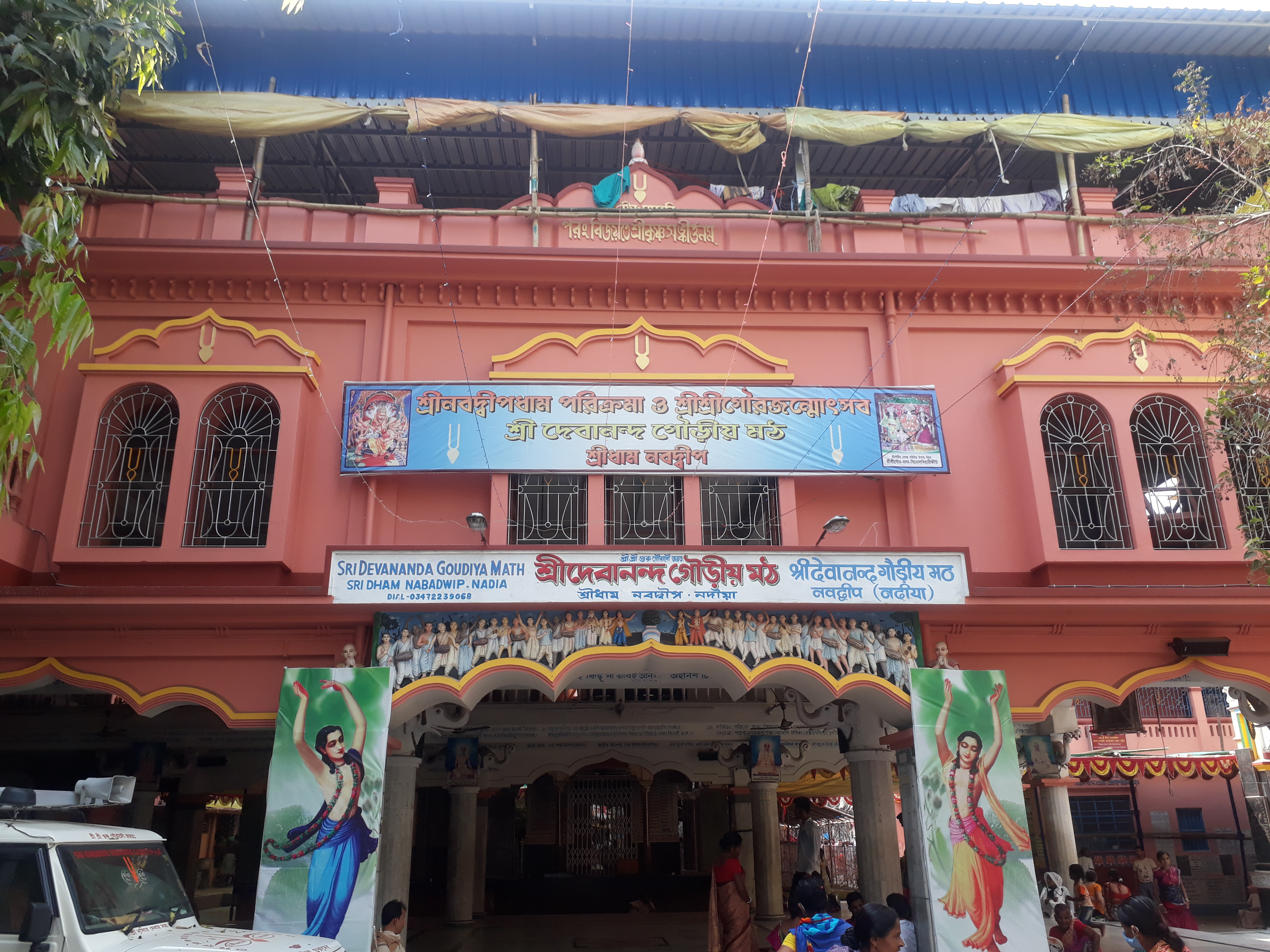

== See also ==
- Bhakti Prajnana Kesava Goswami
