= Bhaktisiddhanta Sarasvati bibliography =

List of works by Bhaktisiddhanta Sarasvati

Quotation

Let me not desire anything but the highest good for my worst enemy.

This is a list of works by Bhaktisiddhanta Sarasvati (1874–1937), a Gaudiya Vaishnava leader and religious reformer. This list includes his original works, commentaries on canonical Vaishnava texts, and articles in periodicals Sajjana-toshani and the Gaudiya.

== Original works by Bhaktisiddhanta ==
- Prahlāda-caritra (The Life and Deeds of Prahlāda) five chapters in Bengali verse, 1886 (it is most probably lost)
- Baṅge Sāmājikatā: varna o dharmagata samāja (Sociality in Bengal: Varna and Dharmic Society), 1899
- Brāhmaṇa o vaiṣṇavera tāratamya-viśayaka siddhānta (Comparative Conclusions Concerning Brāhmanas and Vaisnavas), 1911, revised and enlarged in 1934
- Bhaktibhāvana-pañjikā, Navadvīpa-pañjikā (1914) (The Bhaktibhavana Almanac, The Navadvīpa Almanac) with dates for religious festivals and for ritually important events
- Vaiṣṇava-mañjusā-samāhṛti (A basket of collected definitions about Vaishnavism), Vaishnava encyclopedia in four volumes, 1922–1925
- A Few Words on Vedānta, 1932
- Rai Rāmānanda, 1932 (English)
- Relative Worlds, 1932
- The Vedānta: Its Morphology and Ontology, 1932

== Books on astronomy (jyotiṣa) ==
=== Published between 1896 and 1914 ===
- Ārya-siddhānta by Āryabhaṭa (sixth century), co-edited by K. Dutt
- Bhauma-siddhānta, mathematical calculations compared to those of Western astronomy, co-edited by K. Dutt
- Translation of Jyotiṣa-tattvam by Raghunandana Bhaṭṭācārya
- Ravicandrasāyanaspaṣṭha, annotations by Bhaṭṭotpala (tenth century); mathematical calculations compared to those of Western astronomy
- Sūrya-siddhānta, Purva and Uttara sections; translation from Sanskrit to Bengali and annotations by Bhaktisiddhānta

=== Published in the magazines Bṛhaspati and Jyotirvida ===
- Bhata-dīpikā-ṭīkā by Paramadīśvara, co-edited by K. Dutt
- Camatkāra-cintāmaṇi by Paramadīśvara, co-edited by K. Dutt, translation by Kunjavihāri Jyotirbhuṣaṇa
- Dina-kaumudī by Paramadīśvara, co-edited by K. Dutt
- Laghu-jātaka, annotations by Bhaṭṭotpala (tenth century)
- Laghuparāśarīya or Udūdaya-pradīpā, annotations by Bhairava Datta, co-edited by K. Dutt
- Siddhānta-śiromaṇi, Golādhyāya (in Bṛhaspati) and Grahaganitādhyaya (in Jotirvida) with Vāsanā commentary (bhāṣya) by Bhāskarācārya (twelfth century); translation in Bengali and annotations by Bhaktisiddhānta

== Canonical works published with a commentary by Bhaktisiddhānta ==
- Upadeśāmṛta, by Rūpa Gosvāmī, with translation and a commentary called Anuvṛtti, 1914
- Caitanya-caritāmṛta, by Kṛṣṇadāsa Kavirāja Gosvāmī, with a commentary called Anubhāsya, 1915
- Śrīmad-bhāgavatam, with commentary, 1923–1935
- Bhakti-sandarbha, by Jīva Gosvāmī, with Bengali translation and a commentary called Gaudīya-bhāṣya, only the initial portion, 1924–1933
- Prameya-ratnāvalī, by Baladeva Vidyābhūśaṇa, with a commentary called Gauḍīya-bhāṣya, 1924
- Śrī Caitanya-bhāgavata, by Vṛndāvana dāsa Ṭhākura, first edition, 1924, second edition with a commentary called Gauḍīya-bhāṣya, 1932
- Śrī Caitanya-candrāmṛta and Śrī Navadvīpa-śataka by Prabodhānanda Sarasvatī, with translation and a commentary called Gaudīya-bhāṣya, 1926
- Śrī Brahma-saṁhitā, chapter 5 with commentary by Jīva Gosvāmī; translation and paraphrase of that commentary in English by Bhaktisiddhānta, 1932
- Īśopaniṣad

== Unpublished works ==
- The commentary (Anubhāsyam) on the Vedānta-sūtra by Madhva
- Sarasvatī-jayaśrī, a volume called Śrī-parva, recently recovered
- Diary 1904–1936, recently recovered

== Books written or edited by Bhaktivinoda and published by Bhaktisiddhānta ==
- Amṛta-pravāha-bhāṣya (The Flow of Nectarine Commentaries), a commentary on the Caitanya-caritāmṛta
- Arcana-kaṇa (A Drop of Image Worship)
- Arcana-paddhati (The Ritual Manual for Image Worship)
- Bhagavad-gītā, with translation and commentary (Rasika-rañjana)
- Bhakti-ratnākara, published posthumously
- Bhajana-rahasya (The Secret of Bhajana)
- Gītā-mālā (A Garland of Songs)
- Gītāvalī (A Wave of Songs)
- Hari-nāma-cintāmaṇi (The Touchstone of the Names of Hari)
- Kalyāna-kalpataru (The Auspicious Wish-Fulfilling Tree)
- Jaiva Dharma (The Dharma of Jīvas)
- Life and Precepts of Shree Chaitanya Mahaprabhu
- Sanmodana-bhāṣya (Highly Delightful Commentaries) a commentary on the Śiksāstaka by Śri Caitanya
- Śaranāgati (The Path of Surrender) (Bengali, English, Tamil)
- Śrī Caitanya-śiksāmṛta (The Nectarian Teachings of Śri Caitanya) (Bengali, English, Telugu)
- Śrī Caitanyopaniṣad
- Śrī Navadvīpa-dhāma-māhātmya (The Sublimity of the Holy Place of Navadvīpa)
- Śrī Navadvīpa-dhāma-granthamāla (The Garland of Texts about the Holy Place of Navadvīpa)
- Tattva-muktāvalī (A Pearl Necklace of Truths)
- Tattva-sūtra (Sūtras about the Truth) (in Devanāgarī script)
- Tattva-viveka (Truth of Knowledge about Reality)
- The Bhāgavat: Its Philosophy and Theology

== Canonical works by other authors published by Bhaktisiddhānta ==
- Gaura-kṛṣṇodaya (The Advent of Gaura Kṛṣṇa) by Govinda Dāsa, 1914
- Mani-mañjarī (The Budding Crest Jewel) by Nārāyaṇa Paṇḍita with translation, 1926
- Vedānta-tattva-sāra (The Essential Truths of the Vedanta) by Rāmānujācārya with translation, 1926
- Prema-bhakti-candrikā (The Moonlight of Pure Devotional Love) by Narottama Dāsa, 1927
- Sadācāra-smṛti (The Smrti Text of Proper Conduct) by Madhva with translation, 1927
- Hari-nāmāmṛta-vyākaraṇa (The Grammar of the Nectarine Names of Hari) by Jīva Gosvāmī, 1928
- Hari-bhakti-kalpa-latikā (The Wish-Fulfilling Creepers of Devotion to Hari) with translation (author unknown), second edition with Bengali translation, 1931
- Prema-vivarta (The Transformation of Pure Love) by Jagadānanda Paṇḍita
- Sat-kriyā-sāra-dīpikā (The Lamp and Essence of Proper Rituals) by Gopāla Bhaṭṭa Gosvāmī
- Saṁskāra-dīpikā (The Lamp of Purificatory Rituals)
- Śrī Caitanya-maṅgala by Locana Dāsa Ṭhākura

== Articles in the Sajjana-toṣaṇī ==
=== 1897 ===
- Sanskṛt-bhaktamāla, a review of the Sanskrit text Bhaktamāla

=== 1899 ===
- Śrīman Nāthamuni (Nāthamuni)
- Yāmunācārya (Yāmunācārya)
- Śrī Rāmānujācārya (Rāmānuja)

=== 1915–16 ===
- Pūrva-bhāṣā (Introductory Words)
- Prānīra prati dayā (Compassion Toward Living Beings)
- Śrī Madhvamuni-carita (The Life and Works of Madhva Muni)
- Ṭhākurera smṛti-samiti (The Memorial Assembly for Bhaktivinoda Ṭhākura)
- Divyasūri vā Ālvāra (Divyasūri or Ālvāra, saint in Rāmānuja’s sampradāya)
- Jayatīrtha (Jayatīrtha)
- Godādevī (Godādevī)
- Pāñcarātrika adhikāra (Qualification According to the Pāñcarātrika System)
- Prāpti svīkāra (Letter of Acknowledgment of Receipt)
- Vaiṣṇava smṛti (The Smṛti Texts of the Vaishnavas)
- Śrī patrikāra kathā (The Message of the Magazine)
- Bhaktāṅghri-renu (The Dust of the Feet of Bhaktas)
- Kulaśekhara (Kulaśekhara)
- Sāmayik prasaṅga (Concerning Current Events)
- Śrī Gaurāṅga, philosophical topics concerning Sri Gaurāṅga (Caitanya)
- Abhakti-mārga (The Path of Nonbhakti)
- Viṣṇu citta (Vishnu Citta)
- Pratikūla matavāda (Unfavorable Philosophies)
- Mahātmā Śrīla Kṛṣṇadāsa (The Great Soul Kṛṣṇadāsa Kavirāja)
- Toṣaṇīra kathā (The Message of Sajjana-toṣaṇī)
- Śrī guru svarūpa (The Real Identity of the Guru)
- Prabodhānanda (Prabodhānanda)
- Śrī bhakti-mārga (The Path of Bhakti)
- Samālocanā (Critical Review)
- Toṣaṇī-prasaṅga (Regarding the Sajjana-toṣaṇī)
- Artha o anartha (Wealth and Worthlessness)
- Baddha, tatasthā o mukta (The Bound, the Marginal, and the Liberated)
- Gohite pūrvādeśa (Previous Instructions about the Welfare of the Cows)
- Prākṛta o aprākṛta (Material and Nonmaterial)
- Antardvīpa (an article about the island of Antardvīpa in Nabadwip)
- Prakata-pūrnimā (The Full-Moon Night of Appearance)
- Caitanyābda (The Era Beginning with Caitanya)
- Upakurvāna (Time-Limited Celibacy)
- Varṣa-śesa (The End of the Year)

=== 1916–17 ===
- Nava-varṣa (New Year)
- Āsaner kathā (The Message of the Āsana)
- Ācārya-santāna (Descendants of the Ācāryas)
- Videśe gaura-kathā (The Message of Gaura Abroad)
- Samālocanā (Critical Review)
- Āmāra prabhura kathā (Topics about My Master), about Gaura Kiśora dāsa Bābājī
- Vaiṣṇavera viśaya (The Material Possessions of a Vaishnava)
- Guru-svarūpe punah praśna (Another Question about the True Identity of a Guru)
- Vaiṣṇava-vaṁśa (The Lineage of the Vaishnavas)
- Viraha-mahotsava (The Great Festival of Separation)
- Śrī patrikāra ukti (Statements of the Magazine)
- Prākṛta-rasa-śata-dūṣanī (The Hundred Flaws of Materialistic Rasa)
- Duiti ullekha (Two Mentioned Things)
- Gānera adhikārī ke? (Who Is Qualified to Sing?)
- Sadācāra (Proper Conduct)
- Amāyā (Nonillusion)
- Prārthanā-rasa-vivṛti (Explanation of the Rasa of Prayers)
- Pratibandhaka (Obstacles)
- Bhāi sahajiyā (My Brother Sahajiyā)
- Varṣa-śeṣa (Year’s End)

=== 1917–18 ===
- Nava-varṣa (New Year)
- Samālocanā (Critical Review)
- Sajjana-krpālu (A Devotee Is Merciful)
- Śakti-pariṇata jagat (The World as a Transformation of Potency)
- Sajjana-akṛta-droha (A Devotee is Without Enemies)
- Sajjana-satya-sāra (A Devotee is thoroughly Truthful)
- Prākrt a śūdra vaisn a va nahe (A Materialistic Śūdra is not a Vaishnava)
- Nāgarī-māṅgalya (Auspiciousness for a Coquette)
- Sajjana-sama (A Devotee is Equipoised)
- Sajjana-nirdośa (A Devotee is Faultless)
- Sajjana-vadānya (A Devotee is Munificent)
- Bhādatiyā bhakta nahe (A Hired Person Cannot Be a Devotee)
- Sajjana-mṛdu (A Devotee Is Gentle)
- Sajjana-akiñcana (A Devotee is without Possessions)
- Sajjana-śuci (A Devotee is Clean)
- Vaisnava darśana (Vaishnava Philosophy)
- Varsa-śeṣa (Year’s End)

=== 1918–19 ===
- Nava-varṣa (New Year)
- Sajjana-sarvopakāraka (A Devotee Is Beneficial to All)
- Sajjana-śānta (A Devotee Is Peaceful)
- Gaura ki vastu? (What Is Gaura?)
- Sajjana-kṛṣṇaika-śaraṇa (A Devotee Is Exclusively Surrendered to Krishna)
- Sajjana-akāma (A Devotee Is Free Passion)
- Sajjana-nirīha (A Devotee Is Harmless)
- Sajjana-sthira (A Devotee Is Determined)
- Sajjana-vijita-sad-guṇa (A Devotee Conquers the Six Bondages)
- Śrī-mūrti o māyāvāda (The Image and the Doctrine of Māyāvāda)
- Śrī Viśva-Vaiṣṇava-rāja-sabhā (The Royal World Vaishnava Association)
- Sajjana-mita-bhuk (A Devotee Accepts Sense Objects in Moderation)
- Bhaktisiddhānta (The Philosophical Conclusion of Bhakti)
- Sajjana-apramatta (A Devotee Is Sane)

=== 1919–20 ===
- Varṣodghāta (Ushering in the New Year)
- Sajjana-mānada (A Devotee Honors Others)
- Sajjana-amānī (A Devotee Undesirous of Respect)
- Sajjana-gambhīra (A Devotee Is Solemn)
- Sajjana-karuṇa (A Devotee Is Compassionate)
- Sajjana-maitra (A Devotee Is Friendly)
- Kāla-saṁjñāya nāma (The Sacred Names according to the Divisions of Time)
- Śaukra o vṛttagata varṇa-bheda (Social Divisions according to One’s Own Nature and Birth)
- Karmīra kanakādi (Gold and Other Assets of a Materialistic Worker)
- Guru-dāsa (The Servant of the Guru)
- Dīksita (The Initiated)

=== 1920–21 ===
- Hāyanodghāta (Ushering in the New Year)
- Aikāntika o vyabhicāra (Single-Mindedness and Deviation)
- Nirjane anartha (Obstacles in Solitary Worship) (the poem Duṣṭa mana! tumi kiser vaiṣṇava?)
- Sajjana-kavi (A Devotee Is Wise)
- Cāturmāsya (The Four Months)
- Pañcopāsanā (The System of Worshiping Five Images)
- Vaiṣṇavera smṛti (The Smṛti Texts of the Vaishnavas)
- Saṁskāra-sandarbha (A Treatise on Ritual Purification)
- Sajjana-dakṣa (A Devotee Is Skilled)
- Vaiṣṇava-maryādā (Appreciating Vaishnavas)
- Sajjana-maunī (A Devotee Is Silent)
- Yogapīṭhe śrī-mūrti-sevā (Serving the Image at Yogapīṭha)
- Aprākrta (Nonmaterial)

=== 1921–22 ===
- Nava-varṣa (New Year)
- Saviśeṣa o nirviśeṣa (With and Without Particularity)
- Meki o āsal (False and Real)
- Smārta Raghunandana, article about the smārta Raghunandana
- Hari-nāma mahā-mantra (The Great Chant of the Names of Hari)
- Mantropāsanā (Worship by Mantra)
- Nisiddhācāra (Forbidden Conduct)
- Śiksāṣṭakera-laghu-vivaraṇa (A Short Description of the Eight Instructions [by Caitanya])

== Articles in the Gauḍīya ==
=== First Year (1922–23) ===
- Śrī-kṛṣṇa-janma (The Birth of Shri Krishna)
- Madhura lipi (Sweet Writing)
- Loka-vicāra (Public Opinion)
- Paramārtha (The Highest Aim)
- Purāṇa-saṁvāda (The Message of the Purāṇas)
- Nīti-bheda (Ethical Differences)
- Ruci-bheda (Differences in Pleasure)
- Śrī Jīva Gosvāmī (Jīva Goswami)
- Gauḍīye prīti (Affection for the Gauḍīya)
- Durgā-pūjā (Worship of Durgā)
- Śarādīyā avāhana (Welcoming the Autumn)
- Je dike bātās (Whichever Direction the Wind Blows)
- Marūte secana (Planting a Seed in the Desert)
- Smārtera kāṇḍa (The Vedic Literary Sections of the Smārtas)
- Vicāra-ādālata (Court of Judgment)
- Sevāpara nāma (A Positive Service Attitude to the Sacred Name)
- Tridaṇḍi bhikṣu gīti (The Song of a Monk Holding the Triple Staff)
- Śrī Madhva-janma-tithi (The Birthday of Shri Madhva)
- Varṇāśrama (Varṇa and Ashrama)
- Aprakata-tithi (Disappearance Day)
- Vraje vānara (Monkeys in Vraja)
- Cyuta-gotra (A Deviated Lineage)
- Nṛ-mātrādhikāra (The Fundamental Right of Every Human Being)
- Bhṛtaka-śrotā (A Hired Audience)
- Vaiṣṇavao abhṛtaka (A Vaishnava Is Never Hired)
- Dīkṣā-vidhāna (The Rules of Initiation)
- Āsurika pravṛtti (Demonic Propensities)
- Śrī Baladeva Vidyābhūṣaṇa, a brief biography of Baladeva Vidyānbhūṣaṇa
- Sadācāra-smṛti (The Smrti Text for Proper Conduct), a discussion of Sadācāra-smṛti by Madhva Pañcarātra
- Nigama o āgama (The Vedas and Related Sacred Texts)
- Śrī Viśvanātha Cakravartī (Viśvanātha Cakravartī)
- Vaiṣṇava darśana (Vaishnava Philosophy)
- Varṇāntara (Changing Varṇa)
- Paricaye praśna (A Question about Identity)
- Asatye ādara (Fondness for Untruth)
- Ayogya santāna (Unworthy Son)
- Aśūdra dīkṣā (Initiation for Non-śūdras)
- Pūjādhikāra (The Qualification to Perform Pūjā)
- Anātma-jñāna (Knowledge of the Nonself)
- Nija-paricaya (One’s Own Identity)
- Vaṁśa-praṇālī (The System of Hereditary Lineages)
- Gaura-bhajana (Worship of Gaura)
- Dhānyā o śyāmā (Grains and Weeds)
- Tṛtīya janma (Third Birth)
- Avaidha sādhana (Illegitimate Practice)
- Baija-brāhmaṇa (Hereditary Brāhmaṇa)
- Pracāre bhrānti (Mistakes in Preaching)
- Bhāgavata-śravaṇa (Hearing the Bhāgavata)
- Maṭha ki? (What Is a Math?)
- Āche adhikāra (There Is Qualification)
- Śrīdhara Svāmī (Śrīdhara Svāmī)
- Vyavahāra (Conduct)
- Kamīnā (Scoundrel)
- Śakti-sañcāra (Saving Potency)
- Varṣa-parīkṣā (Yearly Examination)
- Eka jāti (One Jāti)
- Ihaloka paraloka (This World and the World Beyond)

=== Second Year (1923–24) ===
- Varṣa-praveśa (Entering the New Year)
- Brāhmaṇya-deva (The God of the Brāhmaṇas)
- Guru-bruva (Imitation Gurus)
- Kīrtane vijñāna (Realized Knowledge in Kīrtana)
- Āvirbhāva-tithi (Appearance Day)
- Maṭhera utsava (Festivals of the Maṭh)
- Gosvāmī-pāda (The Respected Goswami)
- Kṛṣṇe bhoga-buddhi (The Psychology of Enjoying Krishna)
- Dīksita (The Initiated)
- Gauḍīya bhajana-pranālī (The Process of Gauḍīya Worship)
- Śrī-vigraha (The Image)
- Jābāla-kathā (The Story of Jābāla)
- Smārta o vaiṣṇava (Smārtas and Vaishnavas)
- Sāmājika ahita (What Is Unbeneficial for Society)
- Prākrta bhoktā ke? (Who Is the Real Enjoyer?)
- Gaudīyera veśa (The Dress of the Gaudīyas)
- Pratisambhāṣaṇa (Speech in Response)
- Sūtra-vidveṣa (Enmity Expressed Tersely)

=== Third Year (1924–25) ===
- Gauḍīya hāspātāla (Gauḍiya Hospital)
- Bhāgavata-vivṛti (Explanation of Śrīmad-Bhāgavatam)
- Śrī Kulaśekhara (Kulaśekhara)
- Meyeli hinduwānī (Effeminate Hinduism)

=== Fourth Year (1925–26) ===
- Madhura lipi (A Sweet Letter)
- Aśrauta-darśana (Non-Vedic Philosophy)
- Vedānta-tattva-sārer upodghāta (Introduction to the Vedānta-tattva-sāra)

=== Fifth Year (1926–27) ===
- Darśane bhrānti (Error in Philosophy)
- Vaiṣṇava-śrāddha (Vaishnava Funeral Rites)
- Ālocakera ālocanā (A Critique of Critics)
- Nyākābokāra svarūpa (The Real Nature of a Contemptible Fool)

=== Sixth Year (1927–28) ===
- Māna-dāna o hāni (Offering Respect and Losing It)
- Gauḍapura (The City of Gauḍa)
- Āsala o nakala (Real and Fake)
- Ahaituka dhāma-sevaka (An Unmotivated Servant of the Holy Places)
- Sarva-pradhāna vivecanāra viśaya (The Most Important Thing to Consider)
- Bhāi kutārkika (Brother Quibbler)
- Kṛṣṇa-bhakta nirbodha nahen (A Bhakta of Krishna Is Not a Fool)
- Prācīna Kuliyāy sahara Navadvīpa (The Town of Nabadwip Is Old Kuliya)
- Kapatatā daridratāra mūla (The Cause of Poverty Is Cheating)
- Ekaścandra (One Moon)
- Puṇyāraṇya (A Sacred Forest)
- Godāy galad (An Error in the Fundamentals)
- Nīlācale Śrīmat Saccidānanda Bhaktivinoda (Bhaktivinoda in Jagannath Puri)

=== Seventh Year (1928–29) ===
- Virakta jaghanya nahe (A Renunciant Is Not Contemptible)
- Āmi ei nai, āmi sei (I Am Not This, I Am That)
- Vyavasādārera kapaṭatā (The Merchants’ Cheating)
- Haṁsajātira itihāsa (The History of the Descendens of the Swanlike)
- Mantra-saṁskāra (The Purification of Mantra)
- Bhoga o bhakti (Enjoyment and Bhakti)
- Sunīti o durnīti (Good and Evil Policies)
- Kṛṣṇa-tattva (The Truth about Krishna)
- Śrīdhāma-vicāra (Examining a Sacred Pilgrimage)
- Ekāyana-śruti o tad-vidhāna (The Ekāyana-Śruti and Its Regulations)
- Pratīcye kārṣṇa sampradāya (The Lineage of Krishna in the West)
- Pañcarātra (Pañcarātra)
- Nīlācale Śrīmad Bhaktivinoda (Bhaktivinoda in Jagannath Puri)
- Tīrtha Pāndarapura (The Holy Site of Pandarpur)
- Māṇikya bhāskara (The Effulgent Manikyas), a praise of the Maharaja of Tripura
- Vaiṣṇava-smṛti (Scriptures Giving Rules of Vaishnava Behavior)
- Mahānta guru-tattva (The Truth about a Great Guru)
- Boṣṭam pārlāmeṇṭ (Vaishnava Parliament)
- Alaukika bhakta-caritra (The Unworldly Life and Deeds of a Bhakta)
- Sumedhā-tithi (The Day Intelligent People Celebrate), about the anniversary of Bhaktivinoda

=== Eighth Year (1929–30) ===
- Śrīdhāma Māyāpura kothāya? (Where Is the Sacred Site of Mayapur?)
- Gaudācale Śrī Bhaktivinoda (Bhaktivinoda in Bengal)
- Sātvata o asātvata (Devotees and Nondevotees)
- Bhārata o paramārtha (India and the Highest Aim)
- Paramārthera svarūpa (The Real Nature of Highest Aim)
- Prācīna Kuliyāya dvārabhet (Entrance Fees in Old Kuliyā [Nabadwip])
- Śikṣaka o śikṣita (The Teacher and the One Being Taught)
- Viṣayīra Kṛṣṇa-prema (The Materialists’s Love for Krishna)
- Āśramera veśa (Appropriate Dress for the Ashram)

=== Ninth Year (1930–31) ===
- Śrī-bhakti-mārga (The Path of Bhakti)
- Bhava-rogīra hāsapātāla (A Hospital for the Materially Diseased)
- Jagabhandhura Kṛṣṇānuśīlana (The Practice of Krishna-Bhakti of Jagabandhu)

=== Tenth Year (1931–32) ===
- Gauḍīya mahimā (The Excellence of the Gaudīya)
- Sat-śikṣārthir vivecya (What a Student of the Truth Ought to Analyze)
- Nimba-bhāskara (Nimbarka)
- Ajña o vijñera narma-kathā (Playful Talks between an Ignorant and a Wise Man)
- Vaiṣṇava-vaṁśa (The Vaishnava Clan)
- Kanphucor vicāra (The Deliberations of Confucius)

=== Eleventh Year (1932–33) ===
- Ekādaśa prārambhikā (Beginning the Eleventh Year)
- Vaiṣṇave jāti-buddhi (Considering a Vaishnava to Belong to a Particular Jāti)
- Mādhukara bhaikṣya (What Should Be Begged from Door to Door)
- Duṣṭi-vaiklavya (Distress from Corruption)
- Āmāra kathā (My Message)
- Sat-śikṣā pradarśanī (The Exhibition of Religious Education)
- Kṛṣṇa bhakti-i śoka-kāma-jādyāpahā (Devotion to Krishna is the Exclusive Way to Transcend Lamentation and Desire)
- Kṛṣṇe matirastu (May Your Resolution Be Toward Krishna)

=== Twelfth Year (1933–34) ===
- Kṛpāśīrvāda (Merciful Blessings)

=== Thirteenth Year (1934–1935) ===
- Sva-para-maṅgala (Auspiciousness for Oneself and Others)
- Vaikuṇṭha o guṇa-jāta jagat (Vaikuṇṭha and the World Born of Three Guṇas)
- Bhogavāda o bhakti (The Philosophy of Hedonism and Bhakti)

=== Fourteenth Year (1935–36) ===
- Nava-varṣa (New Year)
- ‘Baḍa āmi’ o ‘Bhālo āmi’ (I’m Great and I’m Good)
- Tadvana (That Forest)
- Vāstava-vastu (The Real Essence)

=== Fifteenth Year (1936–37) ===
- Hāyanodghāta (Ushering in the New Year)
