= Gaurakisora Dasa Babaji =

Indian religious figure (1838–1915)

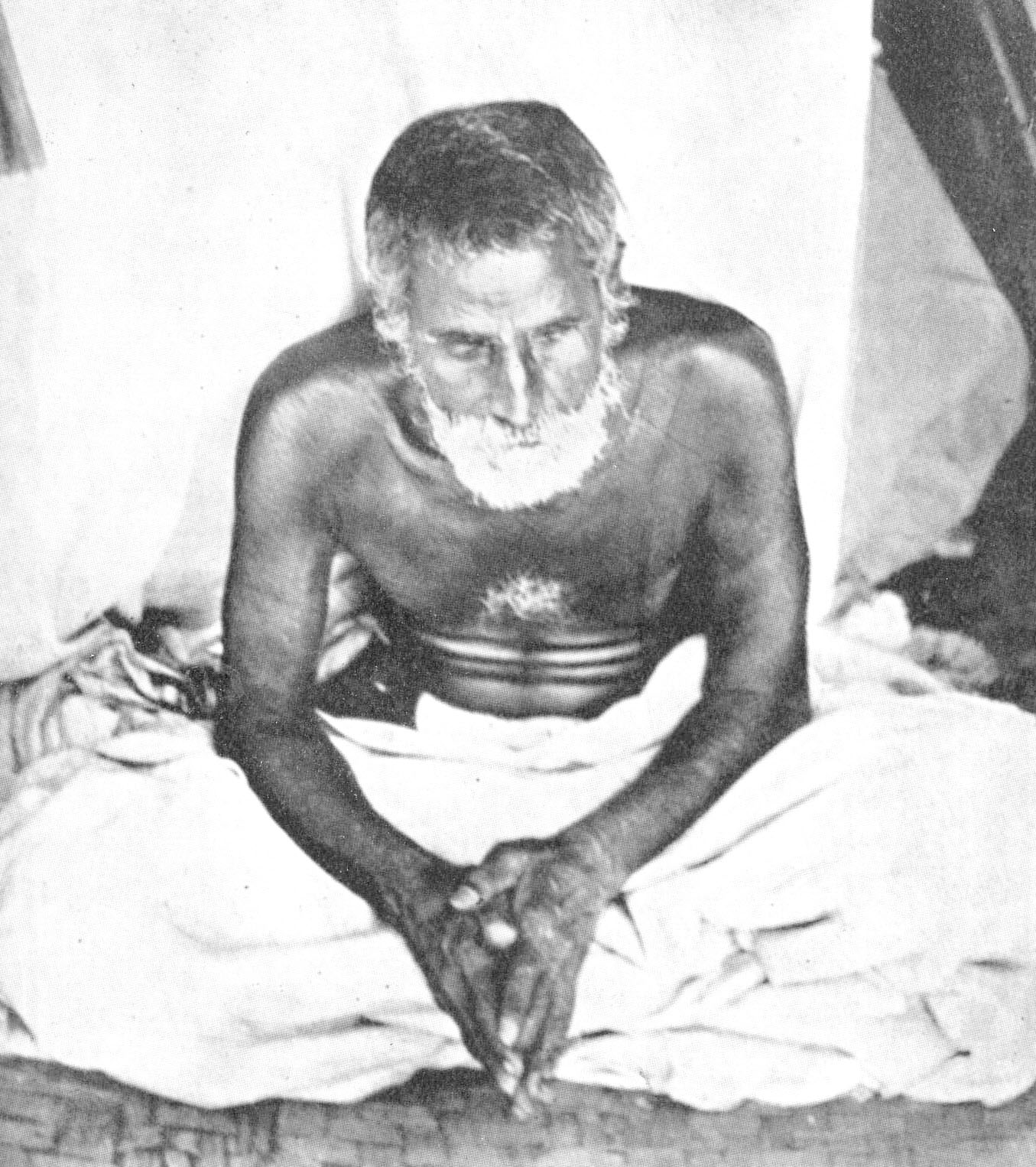

Personal life
- Born: Vamśi Dāsa; 17 November 1838 Vagyana, Faridpur District, Bengal, British Raj
- Died: 17 November 1915 (aged 77) Mayapur, Nabadwip District, Bengal, British Raj
- Known for: being considered a Gaudiya Vaishnava saint

Religious life
- Religion: Hinduism

Religious career
- Teacher: Got initiated by Nimaichand Goswami (Uthali, Bangladesh)

Gaurakisora Dasa Babaji (IAST: Gaura-kiśora dāsa Bābājī; 1838–1915) is a well-known acharya from the Gaudiya Vaishnava tradition of Hinduism, and is regarded as a Mahatma or saint by followers of his lineage. During his lifetime Gaurakisora Dasa Babaji became famous for his teachings on the process of Bhakti Yoga and for his unorthodox avadhuta like behaviour as a sadhu, or babaji in Vrindavan.

He was born on 17 November 1838 in a simple mercantile family in the village of Vagyana, near to Tepakhola in the district of Faridpur, part of modern-day Bangladesh. After the death of his wife when he was 29 years old, he accepted the life of a Babaji in the Gaudiya Vaishnava tradition under the tutelage of Jagannatha Dasa Babaji, after meeting the latter's disciple, Bhagavat Dasa Babaji. He became a mendicant, staying in the holy cities of Vrindavan and Navadwip, deeply absorbed in singing and chanting the sacred names of Radha and Krishna (Bhajan). He died on his 77th birthday in 1915.

In the early 1900s, Bhaktisiddhanta Sarasvati Thakura acknowledged that he took initiation from Gaurakisora Dasa Babaji and given the name 'Varsabhanavi devi dayita dasa'. Bhaktisiddhanta Sarasvati would later take an unorthodox form of initiation into the sannyasa order, in which "he simply sat down before a picture of Gaura Kisora dasa Babaji and invested that order upon himself." This is considered by some a contested topic.

== See also ==
- Chaitanya Mahaprabhu
- Nityananda
- Six Goswamis of Vrindavan
