= Bhaktisiddhanta Sarasvati =

Gaudīya Vaisnava Ācārya (1874–1937)

(Prabhupada) Bhaktisiddhanta Saraswati Goswami Thakur Prabhupāda
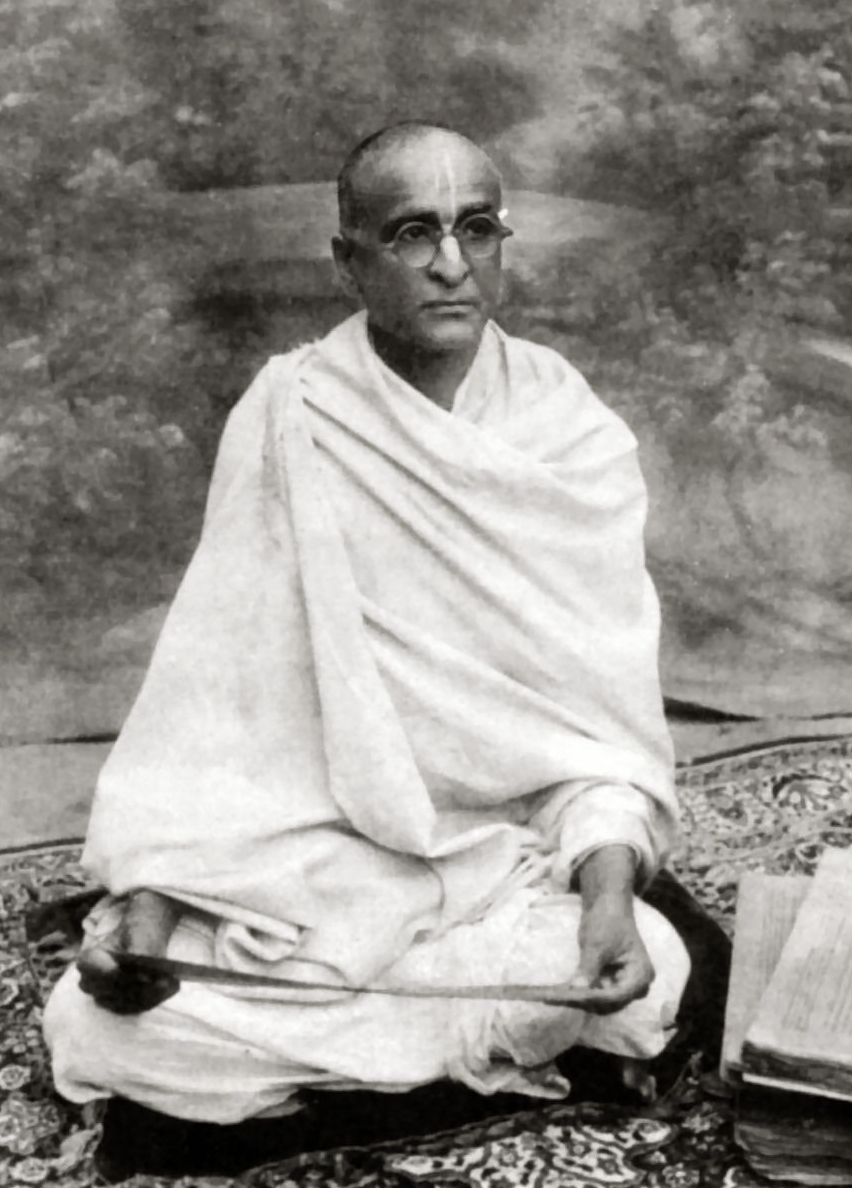

Personal life
- Born: Bimala Prasad Datta; 6 February 1874 Puri, Bengal Presidency, British India
- Died: 1 January 1937 (aged 62) Calcutta, Bengal Presidency, British India
- Notable work: Bhaktisiddhanta Sarasvati bibliography
- Honors: Siddhanta Sarasvati Prabhupada ("the pinnacle of wisdom"); propagator of Gaudiya Vaishnavism; founder of the Gaudiya Math; acharya-keshari (lion-guru)

Religious life
- Religion: Sanātana Dharma
- Denomination: Vaishnavism
- Founder of: Gaudiya Math
- Philosophy: Achintya Bheda Abheda
- Sect: Gaudiya Vaishnavism

Senior posting
- Teacher: Gaurakisora Dasa Babaji
- Disciples: Bhakti Pradip Tirtha Goswami; Bhakti Prasad Puri Goswami Thakur; Bhakti Hridaya Bon; Bhakti Prajnan Keshava; Bhakti Rakshak Sridhar; A. C. Bhaktivedanta Swami Prabhupada; Svami Sadananda Dasa

Bhaktisiddhanta Sarasvati (IAST: Bhakti-siddhānta Sarasvatī Thakur (Prabhupada); Bengali: ভক্তিসিদ্ধান্ত সরস্বতী; Bengali: [bʱɔktisiddʱanto ʃɔrɔʃbɔti]; (6 February 1874 – 1 January 1937), born Bimala Prasad Datt (Bimalā Prasāda Datta, Bengali: [bimola prɔʃad dɔtto]), was a Gaudiya Vaishnava guru (spiritual master), Ācārya, and revivalist in early twentieth-century India, known to his followers as Śrīla Prabhupāda.

Bimala Prasad was born in 1874 in Puri (then Bengal Presidency, now Odisha) in a Bengali Hindu Kayastha family as a son of Kedarnath Datta Bhaktivinoda Thakur, a Bengali Gaudiya Vaishnava philosopher and teacher. Bimala Prasad received Western and traditional Indian education from the late 1880s up until he graduated from Sanskrit College in 1895. His studies gradually gained him recognition from the bhadralok (Western-educated Hindu Bengali residents of colonial Calcutta), earning the title Siddhānta Sarasvatī ("the pinnacle of wisdom"). In 1900, Bimala Prasad was initiated into Gaudiya Vaishnavism from the Vaishnava ascetic Gaurakishora Dāsa Bābājī.

In 1918, following the death of his father in 1914 and the death of his guru Gaurakishora Dāsa Bābājī the following year, Bimala Prasad accepted the Hindu formal order of asceticism (sannyasa) from a photograph of his guru and took the name Bhaktisiddhanta Saraswati Goswami Prabhupada. He started the first center of his institution in Calcutta, later known as the Gaudiya Math. It developed into a missionary and educational institution with branches in India and abroad, distributing books and hosting public programs.

Bhaktisiddhanta opposed the non-dualistic interpretation of Hinduism, or Advaita, that had emerged as the prevalent strand of Hindu thought in India, seeking to promote Krishna-bhakti, which he regarded as its fulfillment and higher synthesis. He was critical of numerous Gaudiya Vaishnava lineages, describing them as apasampradayas – deviations from the original Gaudiya Vaishnavism taught in the 16th century by Chaitanya Mahaprabhu and his early successors. Additionally, he targeted what he alleged as casteism among "Smarta Brahmins".

The mission initiated by Bhaktivinoda Thakur and developed by Bhaktisiddhanta Saraswati was referred to as "the most powerful reformist movement" of Vaishnavism in Bengal of the 19th and early 20th century. In 1966 its offshoot, the International Society for Krishna Consciousness (ISKCON), known for extensively popularizing Gaudiya Vaishnavism outside of India, was founded by Bhaktisiddhanta's disciple A. C. Bhaktivedanta Swami in New York City.

== Early period (1874–1900): Student ==
=== Birth and childhood ===
Srila Bhaktisiddhanta Saraswati Goswami Prabhupāda was born Bimala Prasad at 3:30 pm on 6 February 1874 in Puri – a town in the Indian state of Orissa best known for its 12th-century Jagannath Temple. He was born a few hundred meters away from the Jagannath temple on Puri's Grand Road, the traditional venue for the Hindu Ratha-yatra festival.

Bimala Prasad was the seventh of fourteen children of his father Kedarnath Datta and mother Bhagavati Devi, devout Vaishnavas of the Bengali kayastha community. (Note: According to upper-class Hindu customs, in 1850 Kedarnath Datta, 11, was married with Sayamani, 5. In 1860 Sayamani gave birth to Kedarnath's first son, Annada Prasad, and died of illness shortly thereafter. Kedarnath soon married Bhagavati Devi and had thirteen children with her: (1) Saudamani, daughter (1864); (2) Kadambani, daughter (1867); (3) son died early, name unknown (1868); (4) Radhika Prasad, son (1870); (5) Kamala Prasad (1872); (6) Bimala Prasad, son (1874); (7) Barada Prasad (1877); (8) Biraja, daughter, (1878); (9) Lalita Prasad, son (1880); (10) Krishna Vinodini, daughter (1884); (11) Shyam Sarojini, daughter (1886); (12) Hari Pramodini, daughter (1888); (13) Shailaja Prasad, son (1891). This makes Bimala Prasad the seventh child of Kedarnath and the sixth of Bhagavati.) At that time, Kedarnath Datta worked as a deputy magistrate and deputy collector, and spent most of his off-hours studying Vaishnava scripture under the guidance of local pandits. He translated scripture and wrote works on Vaishnava theology and practice in Bengali, Sanskrit, and English. He was also a prominent associate of the Ghosh brothers, who launched the pro-Vaishnava Amrita Bazar Patrika newspaper. His literary and spiritual achievements later earned him the honorific title Bhaktivinoda.

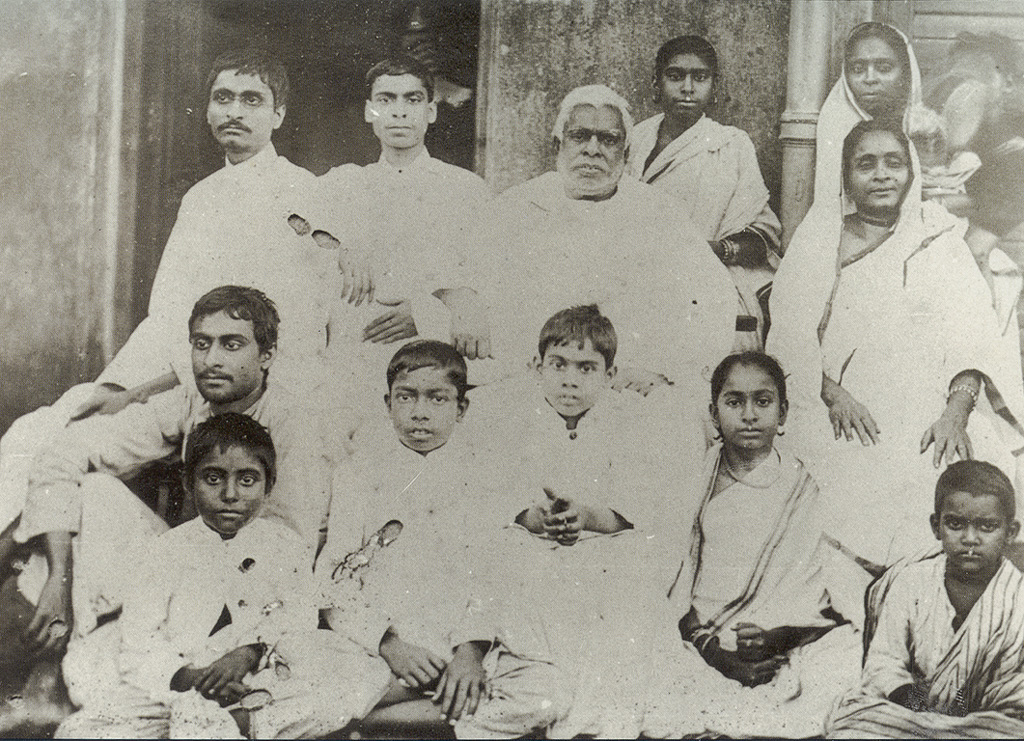
Kedarnath Datta's family ca.1900 From left to right: Back row: Bimala Prasad, Barada Prasad, Kedarnath Datta, Krishna Vinodini, Kadambini, and Bhagavati Devi (seated). Second row: Kamala Prasad, Shailaja Prasad, unknown grandchild, and Hari Pramodini. Front row: two unknown grandchildren.

In 1869, after being posted to Puri as a deputy magistrate, Kedarnatha felt he needed assistance in his attempts to promote the cause of Gaudiya Vaishnavism in India and abroad. Shortly thereafter, he had a dream of Jagannath, in which the deity encouraged Kedarnatha to drop his pursuit of the law and attend to his role as a Vaishnava. After Kedarnatha expressed his difficulty in pursuing his cause alone, Jagannath requested Kedarnatha to pray for an assistant to the image of the Goddess Bimala Devi. When his wife gave birth to a new child, Kedarnatha linked the event to the divinatory dream and named his son Bimala Prasad ('"the mercy of Bimala Devi").

=== Education ===
Young Bimala Prasad, often affectionately called Bimala, Bimu, or Binu, started his formal education at an English school at Ranaghat. In 1881, he was transferred to the Oriental Seminary of Calcutta, and in 1883, after Kedarnath was posted as senior deputy magistrate in Serampore of Hooghly, Bimala was enrolled in the local school there. At the age of nine, he memorised the Bhagavad Gita in Sanskrit. He gained a reputation for remembering passages from a book on a single reading and soon learned enough to compose his own poetry in Sanskrit. His biographers stated that Bhaktisiddhanta Sarasvati could verbatim recall passages from books that he had read in his childhood, earning the epithet "living encyclopedia".

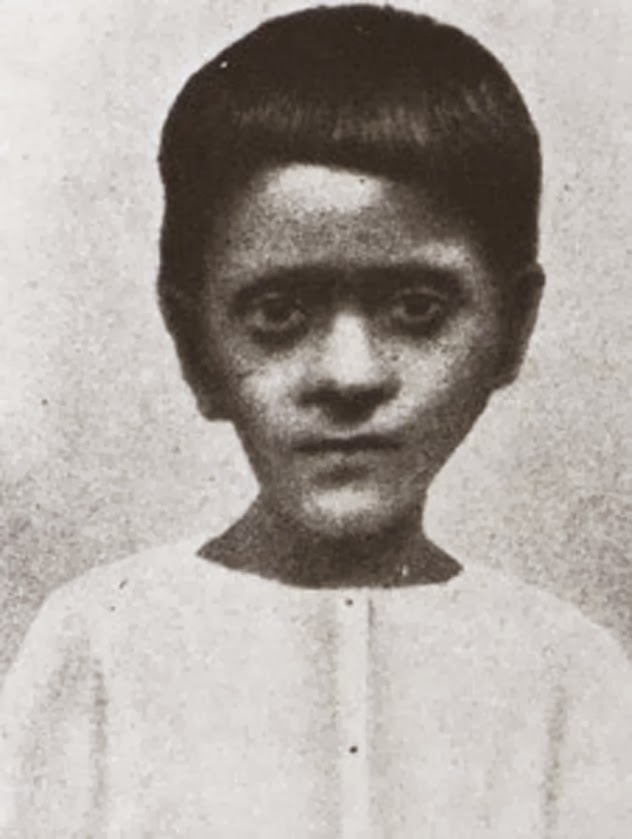
Bimala Prasad (1881)

In the early 1880s, Kedarnath Datta initiated him into harinama-japa, a traditional Gaudiya Vaishnava practice of meditation based on the soft recitation of the Hare Krishna mantra on tulasi beads.

In 1885, Kedarnath Datta established the Vishva Vaishnava Raj Sabha (Royal World Vaiṣṇava Association); the association, composed of leading Bengali Vaishnavas, inspired Bimala to undertake an in-depth study of Vaishnava texts, both classical and contemporary. Bimala's interest in the Vaishnava philosophy was furthered by the Vaishnava Depository, a library and a printing press established by Kedarnath (by that time respectfully addressed as Bhaktivinoda Thakur). In 1886, Bhaktivinoda began publishing a monthly magazine in Bengali, Sajjana-toshani ("The Source of Pleasure for Devotees"), where he published articles on the history and philosophy of Gaudiya Vaishnavism, along with book reviews, poetry, and novels. Twelve-year-old Bimala assisted his father as a proofreader, thus closely acquainting himself with the art of printing and publishing as well as with the intellectual discourses of the bhadralok.

In 1887, Bimala Prasad joined the Calcutta Metropolitan Institution (from 1917 – Vidyasagar College), known for its association with the bhadralok youth; there he pursued extracurricular studies of Sanskrit, mathematics, and jyotisha (traditional Indian astronomy). His proficiency in the latter was soon recognized by his tutors with an honorary title "Siddhanta Sarasvati", which he adopted as his pen name from then on. Sarasvati then attended Sanskrit College, a prominent liberal arts university, where he studied Indian philosophy and ancient history

=== Teaching ===
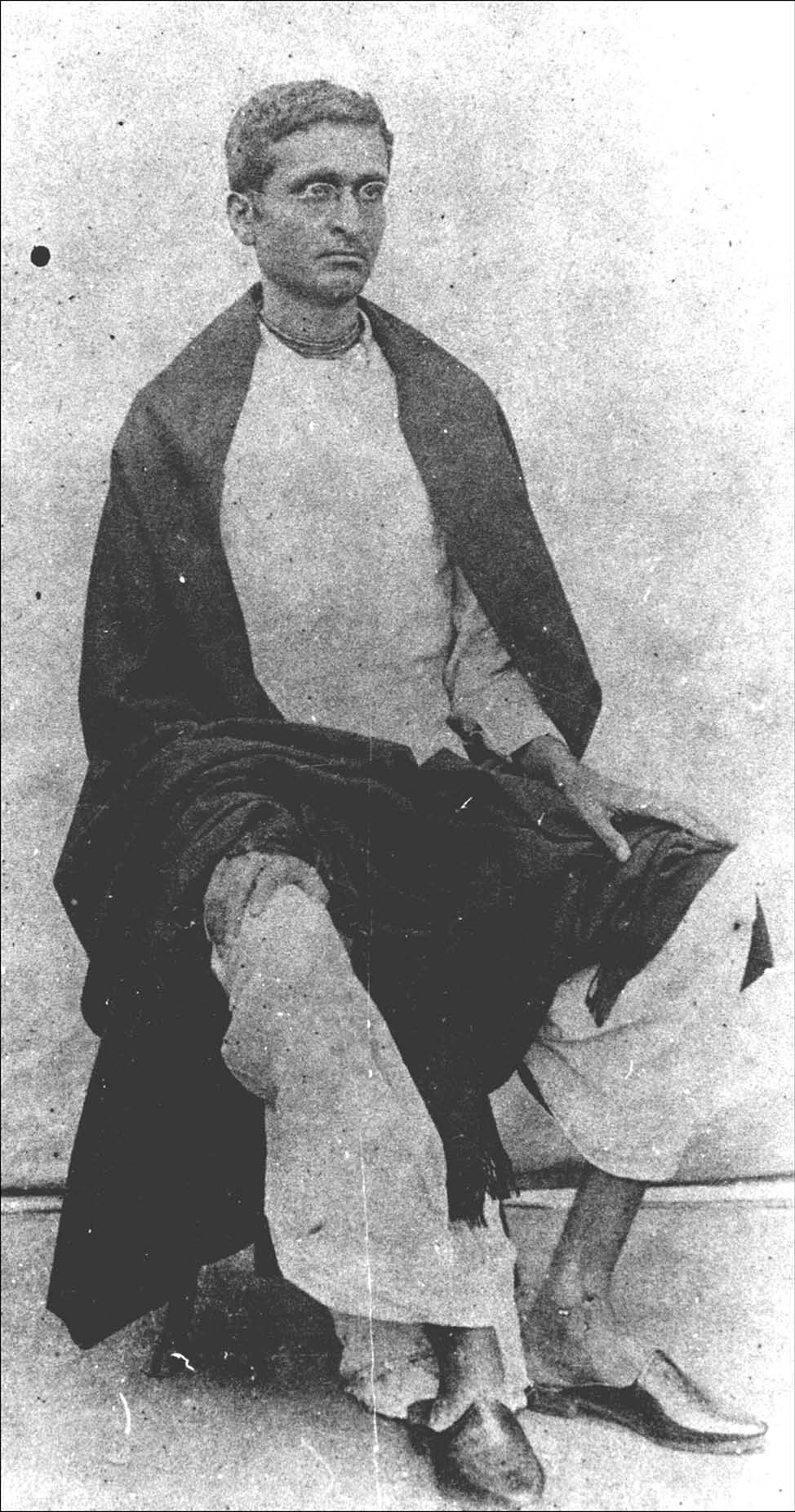
Bimala Prasad as a student, early 1890s

In 1895, Bhaktisiddhanta Sarasvati discontinued his studies at Sanskrit College due to a dispute about the astronomical calculations of the principal, Mahesh Chandra Nyayratna. An associate of his father, the King of Tripura Bir Chandra Manikya, offered him a position as secretary and historian at the royal court, which afforded him financial independence to pursue his studies independently. With access to the royal library, he studied Indian and Western works of history, philosophy, and religion and also started astronomy school in Calcutta.

After the king died in 1896, his heir, Radha Kishore Manikya, requested Sarasvati to tutor the princes, a position Bhaktisiddhanta Sarasvati held till 1908. Bhaktisiddhanta was eventually unsatisfied with the bhadralok lifestyle and searched for an ascetic spiritual teacher. On Bhaktivinoda's direction, he approached Gaurakishora Dasa Babaji, a Gaudiya Vaishnava ascetic and close of associate of Bhaktivinoda. In January 1901, according to his own testimony, he accepted Gaurakishora as his guru. (Note: While it is still being debated what kind of diksha – pancaratrika (into a mantra) or bhagavata (into the name of Krishna) – did Bhaktisiddhanta receive from Gaurakishora Dasa Bababji, there are indications in his own writings that he received the Hare Krishna mantra along with an instruction to chant it a certain number of times a day.) Along with his initiation (diksha) (Note: The specific diksha – pancaratrika (into a mantra) or bhagavata (into the name of Krishna) that Bhaktisiddhanta received from Gaurakishora Dasa Bababji is debated. However, there are indications in his own writings that he received the Hare Krishna mantra along with an instruction to chant it a certain number of times a day.) he received a new name, Shri Varshabhanavi-devi-dayita Dasa (Śrī Vārṣabhānavī-devī-dayita Dāsa, "servant of Krishna, the beloved of Radha").

== Middle period (1901–1918): Ascetic ==
=== Religious practice ===
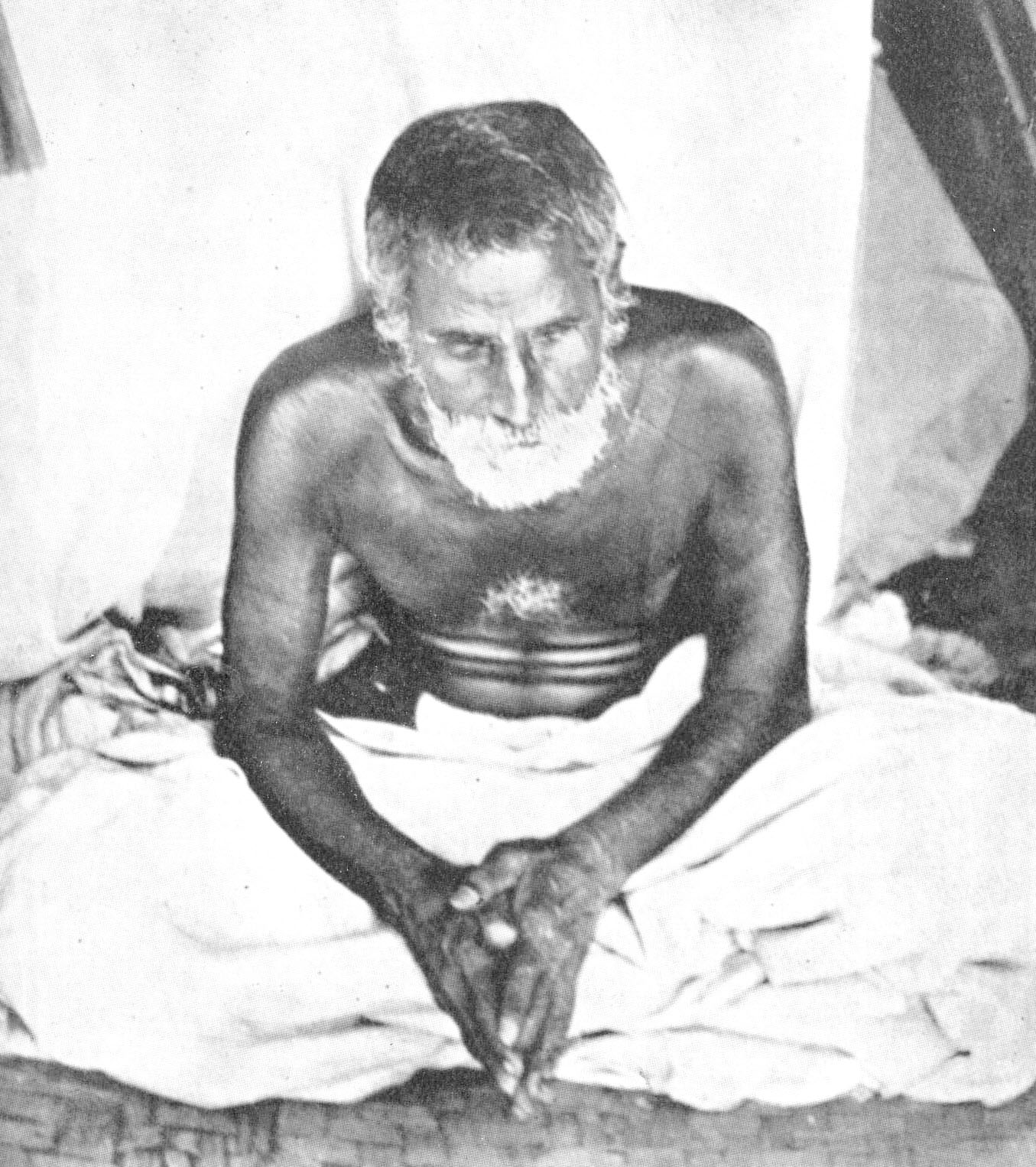
Gaurakisora Dasa Babaji, the guru of Bhaktisiddhanta Sarasvati, ca.1900

The initiation from Gaurakishora Dasa Babaji, an illiterate yet highly respected personality, had a transformational effect on Srila Bhaktisiddhanta Prabhupada. Later, reflecting on his first meeting with the guru, Bhaktisiddhanta Sarasvati recalled:

It was by providential dispensation that I was able fully to understand the language and practical side of devotion after I had met the practicing master [Gaura Kishora Das Babaji] . . . Up to that time, my idea of religion was confined to books and to a strict ethical life, but that sort of life was found imperfect unless I came in touch with the practical side of things.

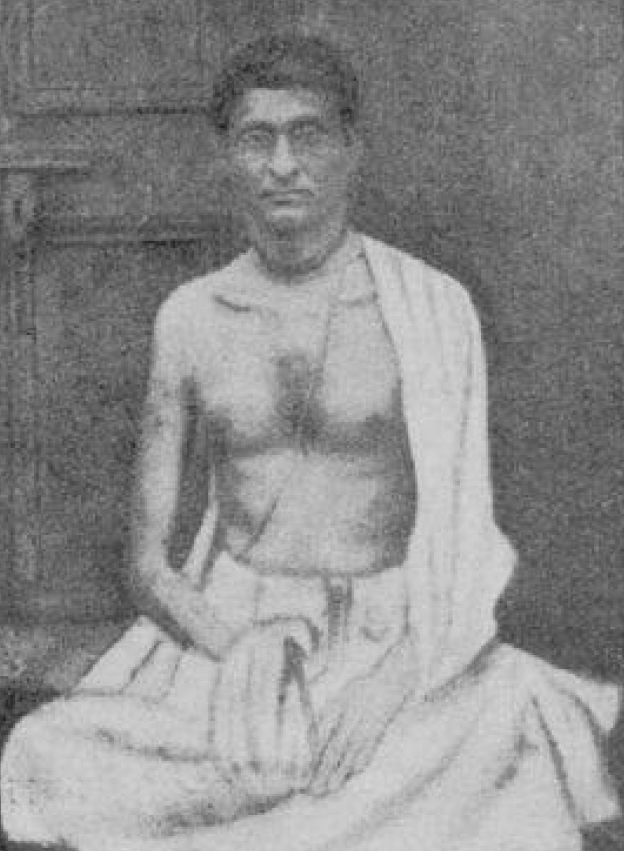
Bhaktisiddhanta Sarasvati during his vow to chant one billion names of Krishna. Mayapur, ca.1905

After receiving the bhagarati initiation, Siddhanta Sarasvati went on a pilgrimage of India's holy places. He first stayed for a year in Jagannath Puri, and in 1904 travelled to South India, where he explored various branches of Hinduism, in particular the Vaishnava Shri and Madhva sampradayas, collecting materials for a new Vaishnava encyclopaedia. He finally settled in Mayapur, 130 kilometres (81 mi) north of Calcutta, where Bhaktivinoda had acquired a plot of land at the place at which, according to Bhaktivinoda's research, Chaitanya Mahaprabhu was born in 1486. At that time, Bhaktivinoda added the prefix "bhakti" (meaning "devotion") to Siddhanta Sarasvati, acknowledging his proficiency in Vaishnava studies.

Starting from 1905, Bhaktisiddhanta Saraswati Prabhupāda began to deliver public discourses on the philosophy and practice of Chaitanya Vaishnavism, gathering a following of educated young Bengalis, some of whom became his students. While assisting Bhaktivinoda in his developing project in Mayapur, Bhaktisiddhanta vowed to recite one billion names of Radha (Hara) and Krishna – which took nearly ten years to complete – thus committing himself to the lifelong practice of meditation on the Hare Krishna mantra following the tradition of Gaurakishora Babaji and Bhaktivinoda Thakur. The aural meditation on Krishna's names, done either individually (japa) or collectively (kirtana) became a pivotal theme in Bhaktisiddhanta's teachings and personal practice.

=== Image and conflict ===
The birth of Bimala Prasad concurred with the rising influence of the bhadralok community, literally "gentle or respectable people", an affluent class of Bengalis, largely Hindus, who served the British administration in occupations requiring Western education, and proficiency in English and other languages. Their attempts to integrate Hinduism with Western philosophy eventually gave rise to a historical period called the Bengali Renaissance, championed by reformists including Rammohan Roy and Swami Vivekananda. This trend gradually led to a widespread popularization, both in India and in the West, of Advaita Vedanta, a philosophy of an impersonal, non-dual ultimate reality, with philosopher Swami Vivekananda terming it "the mother of religions". Bhaktisiddhanta Sarasvati and his peers viewed the growing popularity of Advaita Vendanta as a threat to the personal conception of god in Achintya Bheda Abheda philosophy, as taught by Chaitayna Mahaprabhu, the founder of Gaudiya Vaishnavism.

Bhaktisiddhanta was critical of the depiction of Gaudiya Vaishnavism from his contemporaries in British Calcutta, Nabadwip brahmana communities and British viewpoints through the English Christian and Victorian sensibilities. In his essay "Real and Apparent," he described the westernized depiction of Radha-Krishna and Chaitanya Mahaprabhu as "a creed which may be suspected of a partiality for sexuality, passivism, childish ceremonial and credulity and which declares all secular effort as utterly powerless". Bhaktisiddhanta attributed what he saw as the growing public disapproval of Gaudiya Vaishnavism as aggravated by the prevalently lower social status of local Gaudiya Vaishnavas, as well as by erotic practices of tantrics such as the sahajiyas, who controversially claimed close affiliation with the mainstream Gaudiya school.

On 8 September 1911, Bhaktisiddhanta Prabhupāda was invited to a conference in Balighai, Midnapore, that gathered Vaishnavas to debate the eligibility of the Brahmanas and that of the non-Brahmin Vaishnavas. The debate was centred on two issues: whether those born as non-Brahmanas but initiated into Vaishnavism were eligible to worship a shalagram shila (a sacred stone representing Vishnu, Krishna or other deities), and whether they could give initiation in the sacred mantras of the Vaisnava tradition.

Bhaktisiddhanta Sarasvati Prabhupāda accepted the invitation and presented a paper, Brāhmaṇa o Vaiṣṇava (Brahmana and Vaishnava), the first publication concerning Bhaktisiddhanta's perspectives on the Bramana varna – perspectives which later lead to criticism, and may have been a factor in violence towards Bhaktisiddhanta and his disciples. Bhaktisiddhnanta, while holding Brahmanas as repositories of spiritual and ritual knowledge, asserted that devoted Vaishnavas are spiritually higher than a ritualistic Brahmin without devotion. He described the varnashrama and its concomitant rituals of purity (samskara) as beneficial for the individual but also as currently plagued by misguided practices.

Bhaktisiddhanta endorsed Mayapur as the birthplace of Chaityana Mahaprabhu, instead of the mainstream and historically-supported site, Nabadwip. To this end, he created an institution based in Nabadwip, the Navadvipadhama Pracarini Sabha. Bhaktisiddhanta's viewpoints lead to poor relations among members of the local orthodox brāhmana community in Nabadwip.

This, among other factors led to the decline in attendance of Nabadwip. On 29 January 1925, Bhaktisiddhānta and a large gathering of his devotees were attacked by an upper-caste mob during a pilgrimage in Nabadwip, although the specific accounts of the perpetrators and their motives are incomplete or missing. (Note: There have been a few documented attempts on Bhaktisiddhanta Sarasvati's life. On one such incident in 1925, when the attackers ambushed Bhaktisiddhanta's party, his disciple Vinoda Vihari volunteered to exchange clothes with him, allowing Bhaktisiddhanta a safe escape.)

=== Publishing ===
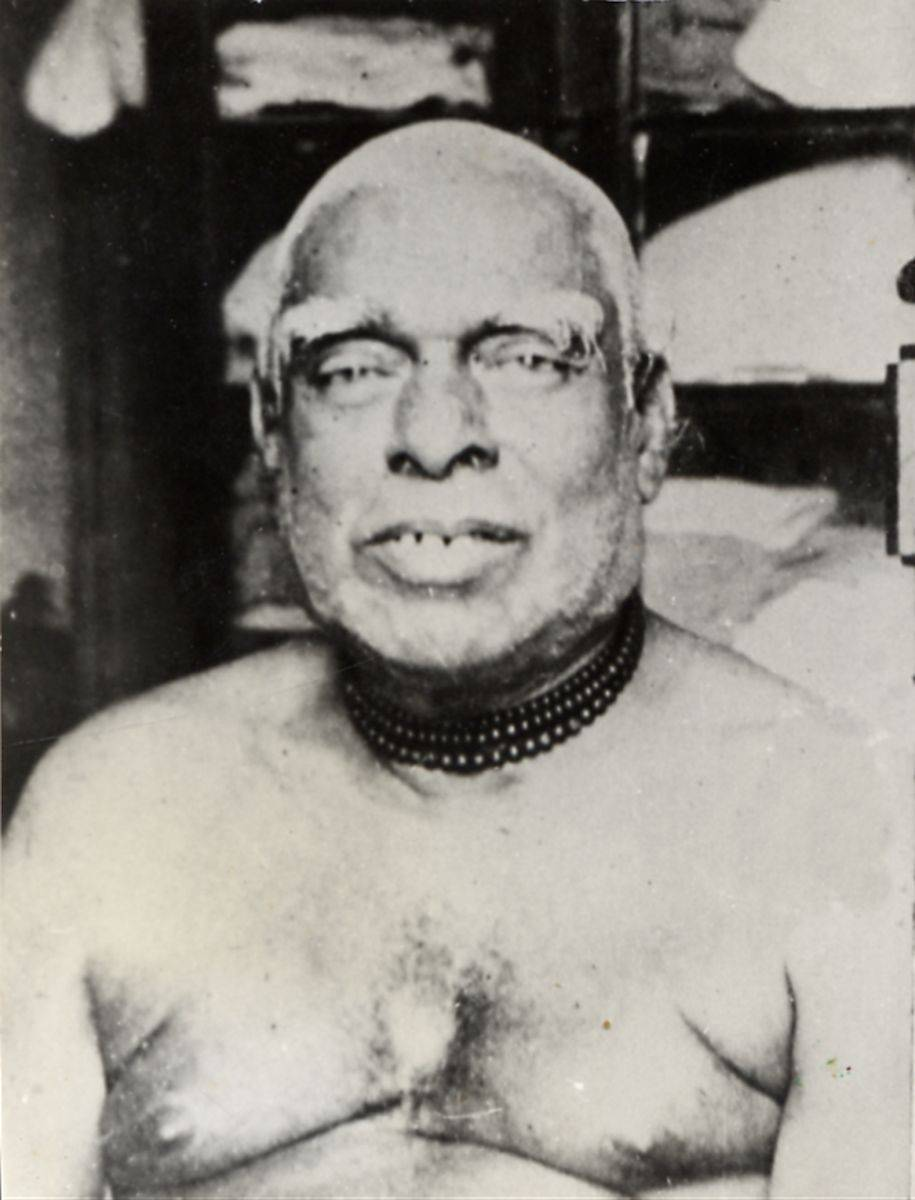
One of the last photographs of Bhaktivinoda Thakur (ca.1910)

According to several accounts, Gaurakishora Dasa Babaji on multiple occasions dissuaded Bhaktisiddhanta from visiting Calcutta, referring to the large imperial city as "the universe of Kali" (kalira brahmanda) – a standard understanding among Vaishnava ascetics. However, in 1913 Bhaktisiddhanta established a printing press in Calcutta and named it bhagavat-yantra ("God's machine"), beginning to publish medieval Vaishnava texts in Bengali, such as the Chaitanya Charitamrita by Krishnadasa Kaviraja, supplemented with his own commentary. This marked Bhaktisiddhanta's new focus on printing and distributing religious literature. Bhaktisiddhanta's publications stemmed from an instruction that he received in 1910 from Bhaktivinoda in a personal letter:

Sarasvati! ... The real service to Sri Mayapur can be done by acquiring printing presses, distributing devotional books, and sankirtan–preaching ... I had a special desire to preach the significance of such books as Srimad Bhagavatam, Sat Sandarbha, and Vedanta Darshan. You have to accept that responsibility. Sri Mayapur will prosper if you establish an educational institution there. (Note: The original letter was never recovered; however, Bhaktisiddhanta quoted these instructions by Bhaktivinoda, apparently considering them as seminal for his mission, in a 1926 letter thus: 1. Persons who claim worldly prestige and futile glory fail to attain the true position of nobleness, because they argue that Vaishnavas are born in a low position as a result of [previous] sinful actions, which means that they commit offences (aparadha). You should know that, as a remedy, the practice of varnashrama, which you have recently taken up, is a genuine Vaishnava service (seva).; 2. It is because of lack of promulgation of the pure conclusions of bhakti (shuddha bhaktisiddhanta) that . . . among men and women of the sahajiya groups, ativadis, and other lines (sampradaya) devious practices are welcomed as bhakti. You should always critique those views, which are opposed to the conclusions of the sacred texts, by missionary work and sincere practice of the conclusions of bhakti.; 3. Arrange to begin a pilgrimage (parikrama) in and around Nabadwip as soon as possible. Through this activity alone, anyone in the world may attain Krishna bhakti. Take adequate care so that service in Mayapur continues, and grows brighter day by day. Real seva in Mayapur will be possible by setting up a printing press, distributing bhakti literature (bhakti-grantha), and nama-hatta (devotional centres for the recitation of the sacred names of God), not by solitary practice (bhajana). You should not hamper seva in Mayapur and the mission (pracara) by indulging in solitary bhajana.; 4. When I shall not be here any more...[remember that] seva in Mayapur is a highly revered service. Take special care of it; this is my special instruction to you.; 5. I had a sincere desire to draw attention to the significance of pure (shuddha) bhakti through books such as Shrimad Bhagavatam, Sat-sandarbha, Vedanta-darshana, etc. You should go on and take charge of that task. Mayapur will develop if a center of devotional learning (vidyapitha) is created there.; 6. Never bother to acquire knowledge or funds for your personal consumption; collect them only for the purpose of serving the divine; avoid bad company for the sake of money or self-interest.)

After the death of his father, Bhaktivinoda, on 23 June 1914, Srimad Bhaktisiddhanta Saraswati Goswami Prabhupad relocated his Calcutta press to Mayapur and then to nearby Krishnanagar in the Nadia district. From there he continued publishing Bhaktivinoda's Sajjana-toshani, and completed the publication of Chaitanya Charitamrita. Soon after, his guru Gaurakishora Dasa Babaji also died. Without these two key sources of inspiration, and with the majority of Bhaktivinoda's followers being married and thus unable to pursue a strong missionary commitment, Bhaktisiddhanta found himself nearly alone with a mission that seemed far beyond his means. When a disciple suggested that Bhaktisiddhanta relocate to Calcutta to establish a centre there, he was inspired by the suggestion and began preparing for its implementation.

== Later period (1918–1937): Missionary ==
After the deaths of Bhaktivinoda Thakur and Gaurakishora Dasa Babaji, Bhaktisiddhanta Saraswati assumed the responsibility for their mission of revitalizing the Chaitanya tradition. Bhaktisiddhanta Saraswati engaged with the smarta-brahmanas with their claims of exclusive hereditary eligibility as priests and gurus; the advaitins dismissing the form and personhood of God as material and external to the essence of the divine; professional Bhagavatam reciters using the text sacred to Gaudiya Vaishnavas as a family business; the sahajiyas and other Gaudiya spin-offs with their imitations of bhakti. His critiques of contemporary religious practices, which he characterized as a "society of cheaters and the cheated," defined his missionary approach and earned him the title "acharya-keshari" ("lion guru").

=== Sannyasa and Gaudiya Math ===
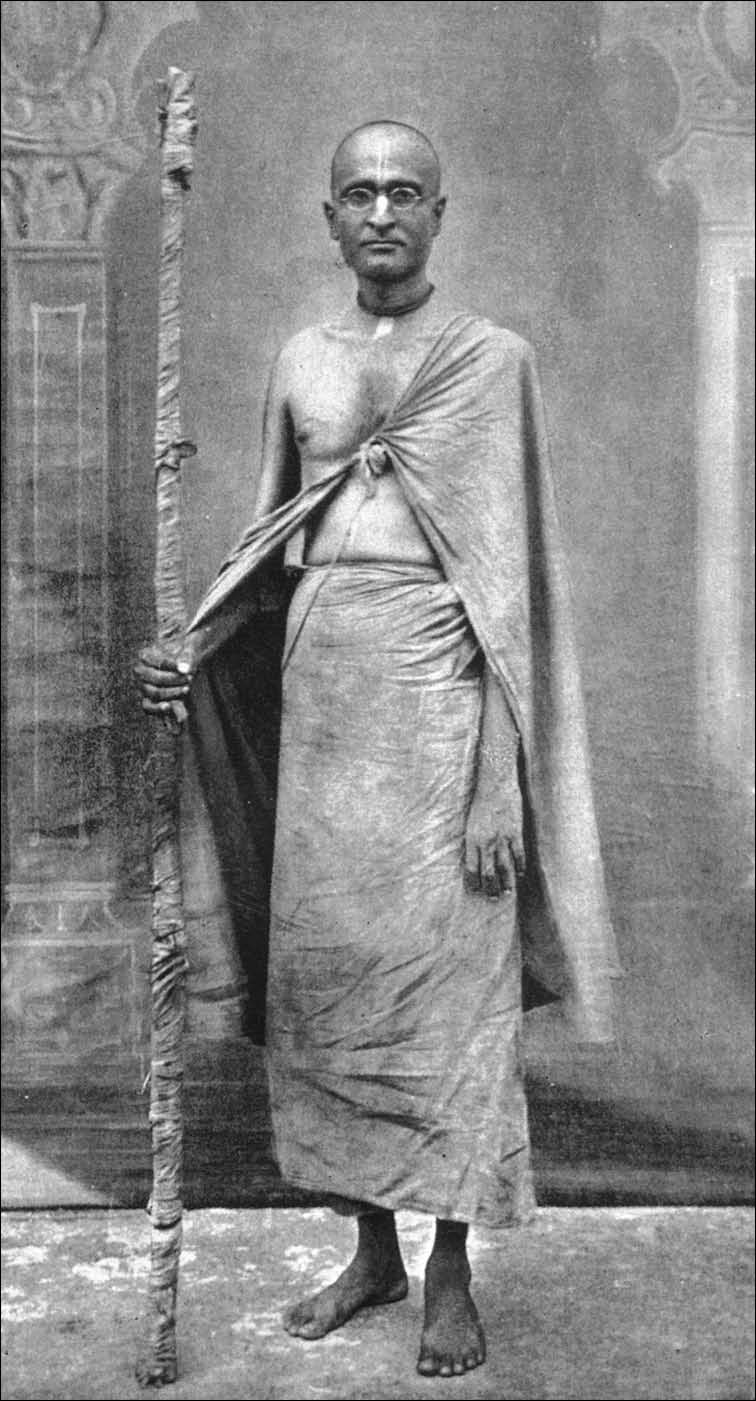
Bhaktisiddhanta Sarasvati Goswami two days after taking sannyasa. 29 March 1918

Bhaktisiddhanta Saraswati visited the Ramanuja ashrams in South India to study their tridanda sannyasa order. Well-established lineages such as Shankara's and the Vaishnavas of South India had sannyasa orders. The Chaitanya tradition had none. On 27 March 1918, before leaving for Calcutta, Bhaktisiddhanta Sarasvati resolved to become the first sannyasi of Gaudiya Vaishnavism post Chaitanya Mahaprabhu period, starting a new Gaudiya Vaishnava monastic order. Since there was no other Gaudiya Vaishnava sannyasi to initiate him, he sat down before a picture of Gaurakishora Dasa Babaji and conferred the sannyasa upon himself. From that day on, he adopted the dress and life of a Vaishnava renunciant under the name Bhaktisiddhanta Sarasvati Goswami.

In December 1918, Bhaktisiddhanta inaugurated his first center, the "Calcutta Bhaktivinoda Asana," at 1, Ultadinghee Junction Road in North Calcutta, which was renamed "Shri Gaudiya Math" in 1920. Bhaktisiddhanta Sarasvati later established sixty-four Gaudiya Math centers in India and three abroad, in London (England), Berlin (Germany), and Rangoon (Burma) during his lifetime. Registered on 5 February 1919, Bhaktisiddhanta Sarasvati's missionary movement was initially called Vishva Vaishnava Raj Sabha, in the name of the society founded by Bhaktivinoda. It soon became known as the Gaudiya Math after the Calcutta branch and his weekly Bengali magazine Gaudiya.

=== Caste and untouchability ===
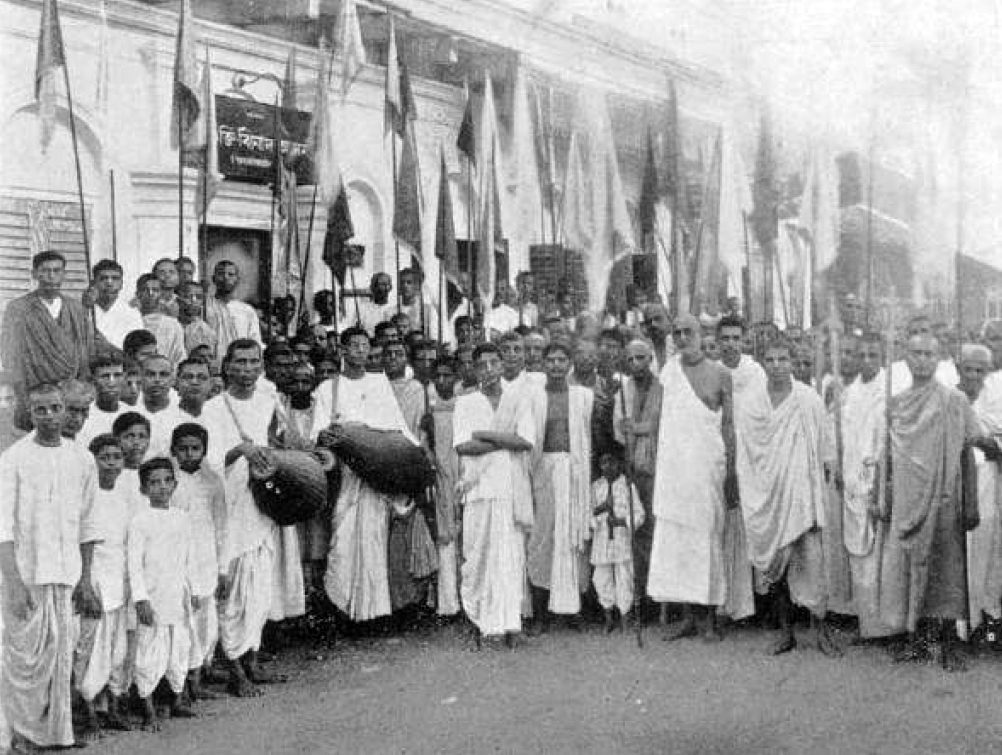
Bhaktisiddhanta with his disciples performing public kirtana outside Shri Bhaktivinoda Asana, Calcutta, ca. 1930

Bhaktisiddhanta noted his views in an essay titled "Gandhiji's Ten Questions" published in The Harmonist in January 1933. In the essay he responded to questions posed by Mahatma Gandhi, who in December 1932 challenged orthodox Hindu organisations regarding the practice of untouchability. In his reply, Bhaktisiddhanta Sarasvati defined untouchables as those inimical to the concept of serving God, rather than those hailing from the lowest social or hereditary background. He stated that Vishnu temples should be open to all, particularly to those who were open to the devotional practice and were willing to undergo a process of spiritual training. He also stated that untouchability had cultural and historical origins rather than a religious one, and as such, Gandhi's questions referred to a secular issue, not a religious one. As an alternative to the secular concept of "Hindu" and its social implications, Bhaktisiddhanta suggested an ethic of "unconditional reverence for all entities by the realization and exclusive practice of the whole-time service of the Absolute". He described this as consistent with the practice of bhakti (devotion), and with service to God as the supreme person, implying moral responsibility toward other beings, which the Chaitanya school describes as eternal metaphysical entities – minute in relation to God but qualitatively equal to one another.

=== True love and renunciation ===
While emphasising the innate spirituality of all beings, Bhaktisiddhanta Sarasvati strongly objected to representations of the sacred love between Radha and Krishna, described in the Bhagavatam and other Vaishnava texts, as erotic, which permeated the popular culture of Bengal in art, theatre, and folk songs. He argued that certain public representations of Gaudiya Vaishnava concepts lacked philosophical accuracy. He repeatedly critiqued these communities in Bengal as the sahajiyas, who presented sexual practices as a path of Krishna bhakti, denouncing them as pseudo-Vaishnavas. Bhaktisiddhanta argued instead that spiritual growth was not through what he described as sensual gratification, but through the practice of chastity, humility, and service.

At the same time, Bhaktisiddhanta's approach to the material world was not escapist. Rather than shunning all connections with it, he adopted the principle of yukta-vairagya – a term coined by Chaitanya's associate Rupa Gosvami meaning "renunciation by engagement". This implied using any object in the service of the divine by renouncing the propensity to enjoy it. On the basis of this principle, Bhaktisiddhanta used the latest advancements in technology, institutional building, communication, printing, and transportation, while striving to carefully keep intact the theological core of his personalist tradition. This hermeneutical dynamism and adaptation employed by Bhaktisiddhanta became an important element in the growth of the Gaudiya Math and facilitated its future global expansion.

=== The Gaudiya Math in Europe ===
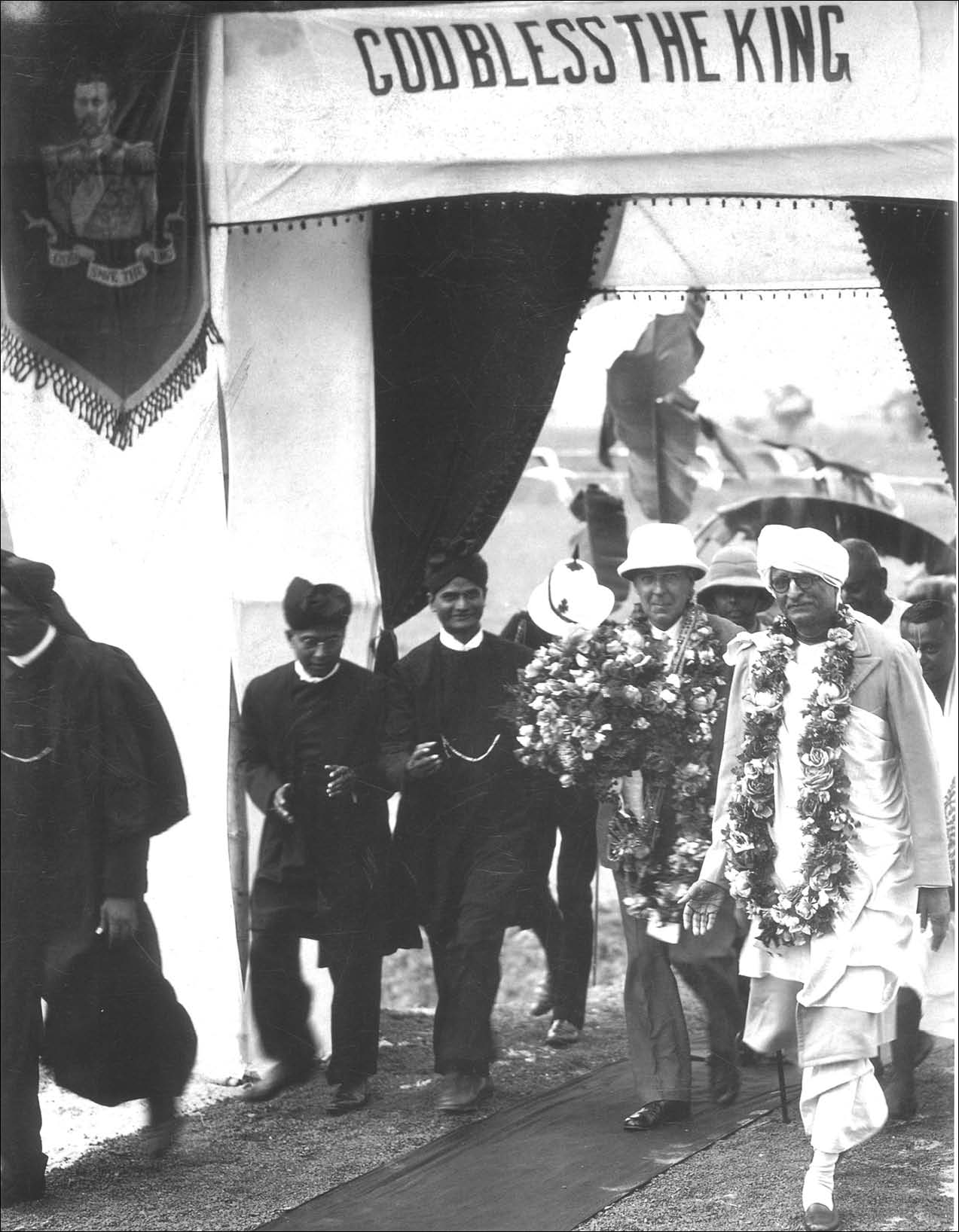
Governor of Bengal John Anderson with Bhaktisiddhanta at the Gaudiya Math headquarters in Mayapur. 15 January 1935

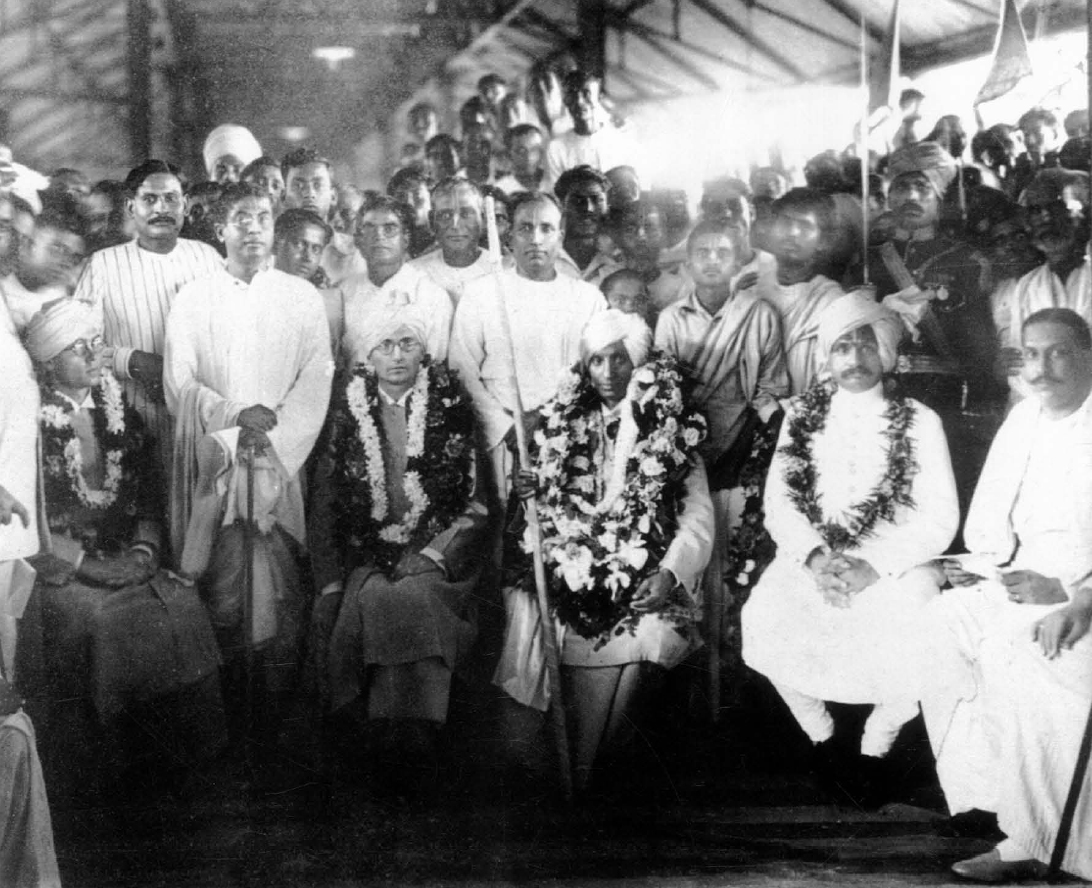
Reception for Swami Bon and two German converts. Seated far right is Bhaktivedanta. Calcutta, 18 September 1935

Bhaktisiddhanta inherited the vision of spreading the message of Chaitanya Mahaprabhu in the West from his father Bhaktivinoda and from the last will of his mother, Bhagavati Devi, prior to her death in 1920 and began planning his mission to Europe. In 1927, he launched a periodical in English and requested British officers to support his movement, which they gradually did, culminating in an official visit by the Governor of Bengal John Anderson to Bhaktisiddhanta's headquarters in Mayapur on 15 January 1935.

On 20 July 1933, three of Bhaktisiddhanta's senior disciples including Swami Bhakti Hridaya Bon arrived in London. On 24 April 1934, Lord Zetland, the British secretary of state for India, inaugurated the Gaudiya Mission Society in London and became its president. This was followed a few months later by a centre established by Swami Bon in Berlin, Germany, where he lectured and met the German academic and political elite. On 18 September 1935, the Gaudiya Math and Calcutta dignitaries offered a reception to two German converts, Ernst Georg Schulze and Baron H.E. von Queth, who arrived along with Swami Bon.

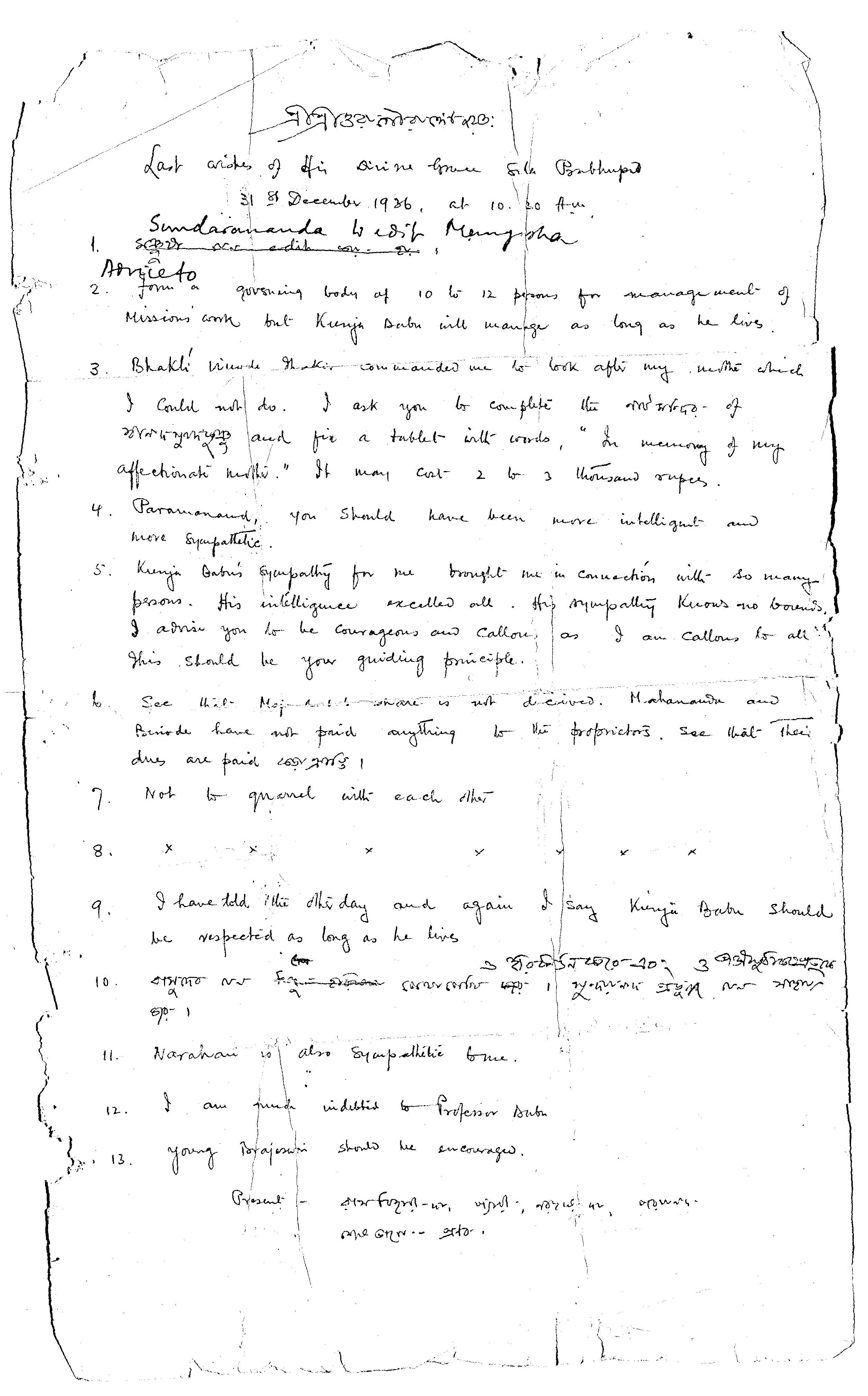
Bhaktisiddhanta's last will, 1936

Bhaktisiddhanta maintained that, if explained properly, the philosophy and practice of Vaishnavism would gradually attract interested people. Despite investments and efforts, the success of the Gaudiya Mission in the West remained limited to just a few people interested to seriously practice Vaishnavism.

In 1936, the importance of the Western venture prompted Bhaktisiddhanta to make it the main theme of his final address at a gathering of thousands of his disciples and followers at Champahati, Bengal. Bhaktisiddhanta prioritized the Western mission and expressed his expectation that a future disciple would successfully spread the teachings globally.

The deep international tensions globally in the late 1930s led Bhaktisiddhanta to stress that solutions to global problems were primarily in the realm of religion and spirituality, and not solely in the fields of science, economy, and politics. On 3 December 1936, Bhaktisiddhanta answered a letter from his disciple Bhaktivedanta, who had asked how he could best serve his guru's mission:

I am fully confident that you can explain in English our thoughts and arguments to the people who are not conversant with the languages of other members. This will do much good to yourself as well as your audience. I have every hope that you can turn yourself [into] a very good English preacher if you serve the mission to inculcate the novel impression to the people in general and philosophers of [sic] modern age and religiosity.

Bhaktisiddhanta Sarasvati died on 1 January 1937 at the age of 63.

== Crises of succession ==
The Gaudiya Math mission is described by scholars as a significant reformist movement in Bengal during the 19th and early 20th centuries. In mission and scope it has been compared to the efforts of Swami Vivekananda and the Ramakrishna Mission, and challenged modern Advaita Vedanta spirituality that had come to dominate the religious sensibilities of the Hindu middle class in India and the way Hinduism was understood in the West. Rather than appointing a successor, Bhaktisiddhanta Sarasvati instructed his leading disciples to jointly run the mission in his absence, and expected that qualified leaders would emerge naturally "on the strength of their personal merit". However, weeks after his departure a crisis of succession broke out, resulting in factions and legal infighting. The united mission was first split into two separate institutions and later fragmented into several smaller independent groups.

== Legacy ==
In 1966, A.C. Bhaktivedanta Swami founded in New York City the International Society for Krishna Consciousness (ISKCON). Based on Gaudiya Math teachings and practices, ISKCON contributed to the global spread of Chaitanya Vaishnavism. The Gaudiya Math movement includes more than forty independent institutions, hundreds of centres and more than 500,000 practitioners worldwide.

== Recognition ==
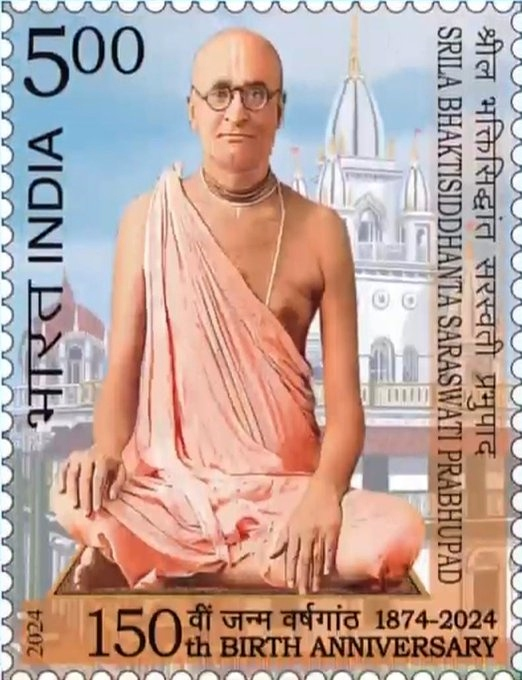
Commemorative stamp - 150th birth anniversary of Bhaktisiddhanta Sarasvati, February 2024.

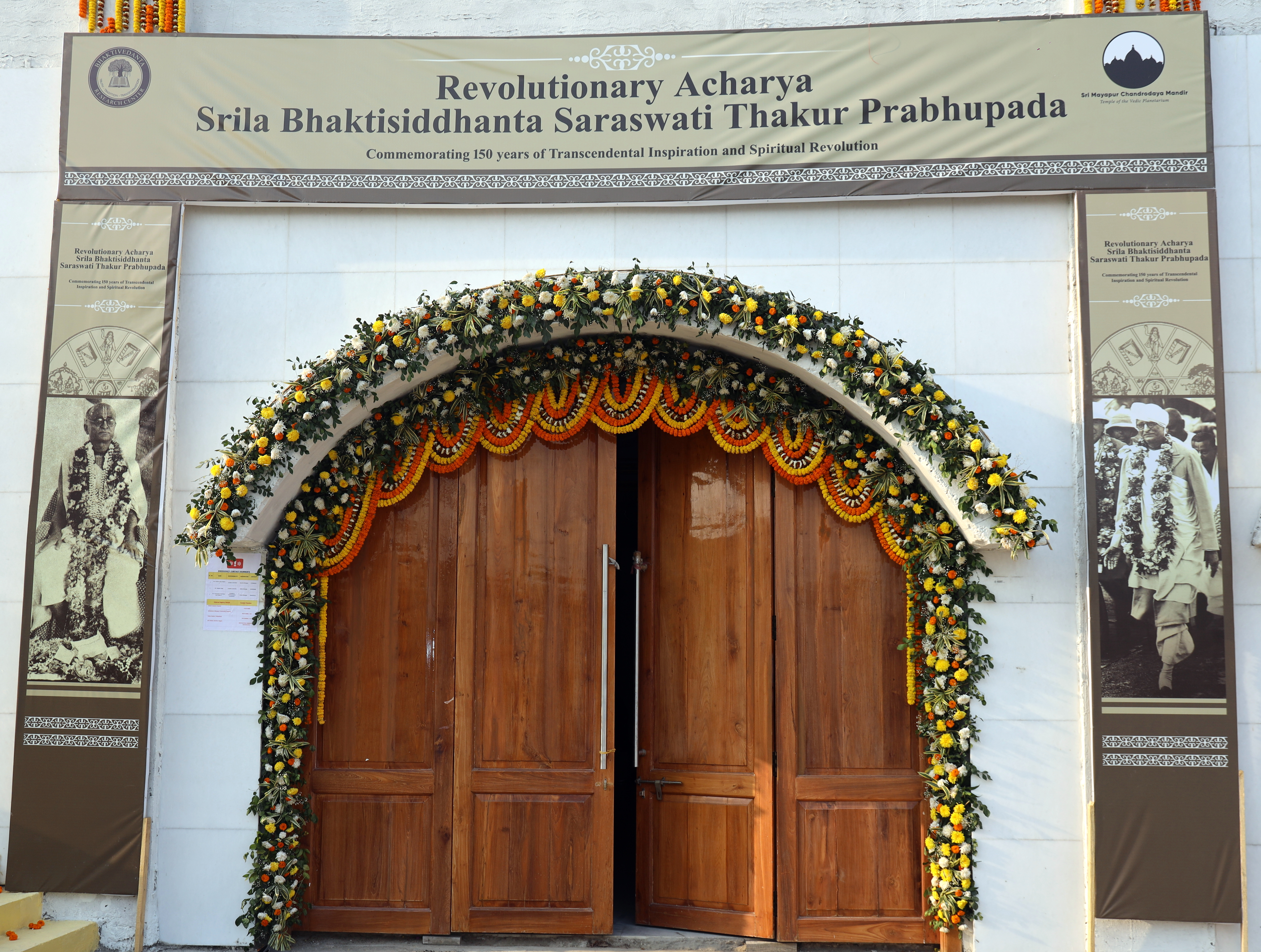
Entrance to the exhibition at the ISKCON TOVP Temple in Mayapur.

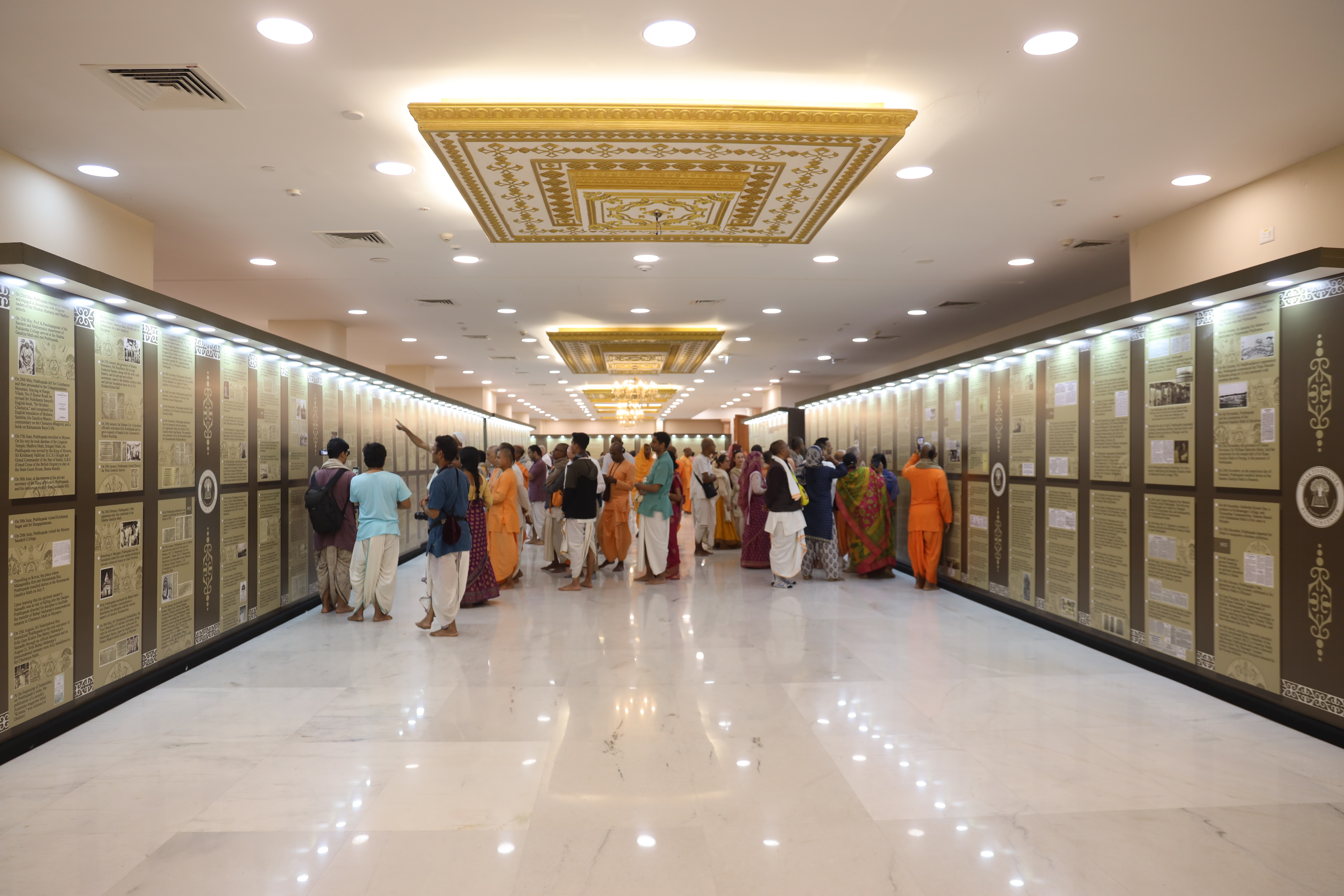
Bhaktisiddhanta Saraswati's sesquicentennial celebration at the ISKCON TOVP Temple in Mayapur.

In November 2023, UNESCO included the 150th birth anniversary of "Srimad Bhakti Siddhanta Saraswati Goswami Prabhupada, philosopher, social reformer and eminent spiritual leader (1874-1937)" in its list of celebration of anniversaries with which UNESCO could be associated in 2024-2025. The inclusion was proposed by India with the support of Cuba, Kazakhstan, Russian Federation, Thailand and Vietnam.

On 8 February 2024, Narendra Modi released a commemorative stamp and coin to mark the 150th birth anniversary of Bhaktisiddhanta Sarasvati.

On 29 March 2024, the Bhaktivedanta Research Center organized an exhibition at the Temple of the Vedic Planetarium in Mayapur to mark the sesquicentennial of Bhaktisiddhanta Saraswati. The exhibition covered his life and work, including his contributions to Gaudiya Vaishnavism, travels, the installation of Mahaprabhu's footprints, spiritual exhibitions across India, and publications. The exhibition included original publications, rare photos, newspaper articles, handwritten manuscripts, and other historical documents.
