= Bhakti Prajnan Keshava =

Gaudiya Vaishnava guru, founder of the Gaudiya Vedanta Samiti (1898–1968)

Bhakti Prajnan Keshava Maharaja
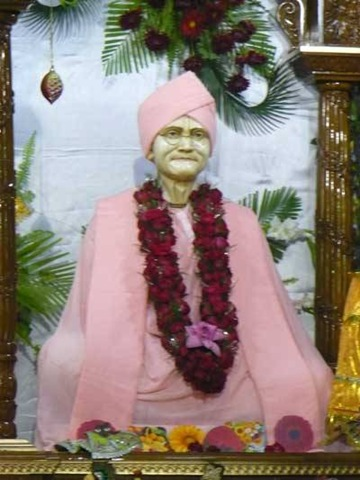
- Murti of Bhakti Prajnan Keshava Maharaja on the altar in the Gaudiya Math in Mathura
- Title: Gaudiya Vaishnava spiritual leader

Personal life
- Born: 24 January 1898 Banaripara, East Bengal, British India
- Died: 6 October 1968 (aged 70) Nabadwip, India
- Other name: Vinodabihari Brahmacari Kritiratna Prabhu

Religious life
- Religion: Gaudiya Vaishnavism
- Initiation: Diksa–1919, Sannyasa–1940

Senior posting
- Based in: Vrindavan, India
- Period in office: 1940 - 1968
- Predecessor: Bhaktisiddhanta Sarasvati
- Successor: Srila Bhaktivedānta Vamana Goswāmī Maharaj.

Bhakti Prajnan Keshava (IAST: Bhakti Prajñāna Keśava; 24 January 1898 – 6 October 1968), addressed by the honorific Mahārāja (Mahārāja), was a Gaudiya Vaishnava guru, disciple of Bhaktisiddhanta Sarasvati and the founder-acharya of the religious organisation "Sri Gaudiya Vedanta Samiti", formed in Calcutta in 1940, and its headquarters, monastery Sri Devananda Gaudiya Math in Nabadwip.

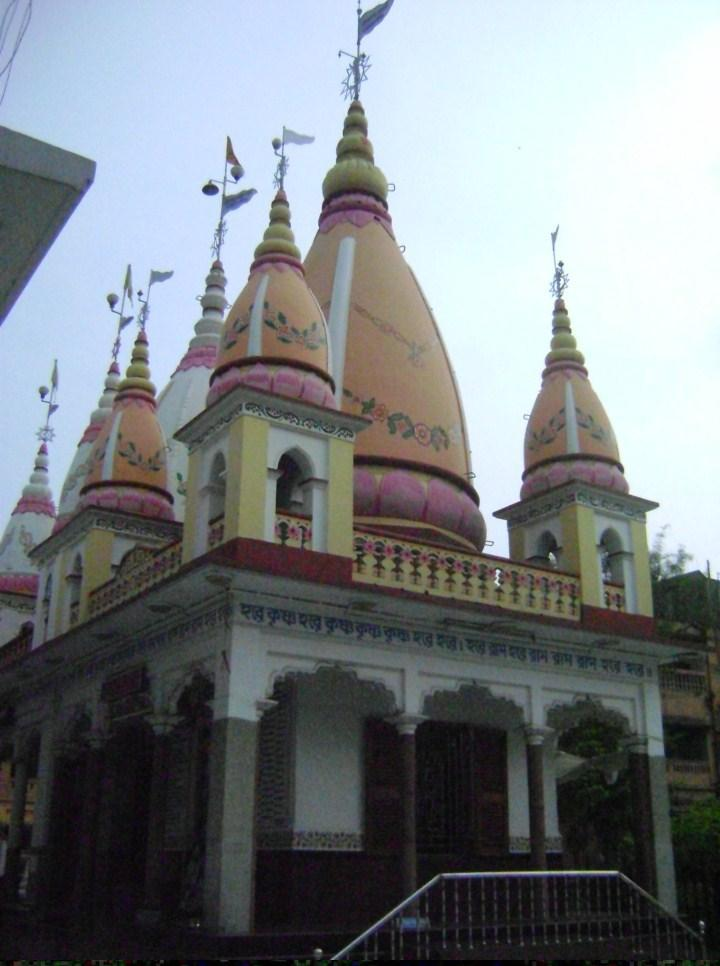
Samadhi Mandir of Bhakti Prajnana Keshav and Bhakti Vedanta Bamana in Sri Devananda Gaudiya Math.

Bhakti Prajnan Keshava Maharaja and A. C. Bhaktivedanta Swami Prabhupada were godbrothers (disciples of the same spiritual master). Abhay Charanaravinda Prabhu became A. C. Bhaktivedanta Swami (taking the title "Bhaktivedanta" and name Swāmī) when Keśava Gosvāmī initiated him into the renounced order of life (sannyasa) on 17 September 1959 at Keshava Maharaja's temple in Mathura.

== Bibliography ==
- Bhaktivedanta, Narayana (1999), Acarya Kesari Sri Srimad Bhakti Prajnana Kesava Gosvami - His Life and Teachings (1st ed.), GVP, pp. 571 pages, ISBN 81-86737-14-6
- Broo, Måns (2003), As good as God: the guru in Gauḍīya Vaiṣṇavism, Åbo Akademi University Press, ISBN 951-765-132-5, archived from the original on 4 March 2016
- Brzezinski, Jan (2004). "Charismatic Renewal and Institutionalization in the History of Gaudiya Vashnavism and the Gaudiya Math". In Bryant, Edwin F.; Ekstrand, Maria L. (eds.). The Hare Krishna Movement: The Postcharismatic Fate of a Religious Transplant. New York: Columbia University Press. pp. 73–96. ISBN 0-231-12256-X.
- Rosen, Steven J. (1994), Vaishnavism: Contemporary Scholars Discuss the Gaudiya Tradition, Motilal Banarsidass, ISBN 81-208-1235-2
- Goswami, Satsvarupa Dasa (2002), Srila Prabhupada Lilamrta, vol. 2 (2nd ed.), Bhaktivedanta Book Trust, p. 1191, ISBN 0-89213-357-0
- Sherbow, Paul H. (2004). "A.C. Bhaktivedanta Swami's Preaching in the Context of Gaudiya Vashnavism". In Bryant, Edwin F.; Ekstrand, Maria L. (eds.). The Hare Krishna Movement: The Postcharismatic Fate of a Religious Transplant. New York: Columbia University Press. pp. 129–46. ISBN 0-231-12256-X.
