= Bhajan kutir =

Hindu residence or hut

Jiva Gosvami’s Bhajana Kutir at Radha-kunda

In Gaudiya Vaishnavism, a bhajan kutir (IAST: bhajana-kuṭira) is a residence or meditation hut used by ascetics. They are usually a small, basic residence located in Vrindavan.
