= Ritu Beri =

Indian fashion designer

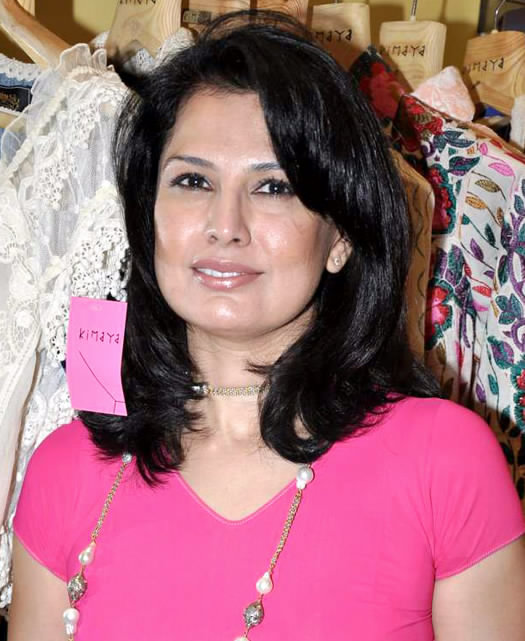
- Born: 3 May 1972 (age 53); New Delhi, India
- Occupations: Fashion designer, Advisor Rishihood University
- Label: Ritu Beri
- Awards: Chevalier de l'Ordre des Arts et des Lettres by the French Government; The Lady of the Order of Civil Merit by the Spanish Government

Ritu Beri is an Indian fashion designer. In March 2002, she became head of the Ready to Wear section of French fashion brand, Jean-Louis Scherrer,.

She launched a not-for-profit organisation, The Luxury League to promote creativity and innovation in the luxury industry of India. She was appointed an advisor to the Khadi and Village Industries Commission (KVIC), a part of the Ministry of Micro, Small and Medium Enterprises, Government of India. She is also an advisor to Rishihood University. ...

== Personal life ==
She was born in Delhi. In 2004 she married exporter Bobby Chadha. Her father Balbir Singh Beri is an ex-army officer. Her mother Indu Beri is an entrepreneur.

== Career ==
In 2000, Beri became head of the French fashion house, Jean Louis Scherrer, to design their pret-a-porter collections.

Ritu Beri was awarded the Chevalier des Arts et des Lettres (Knight of the Order of Arts and Letters) by the French government in 2010.

On 9 April 2016, Beri launched two books, The Designs of A Restless Mind and The Fire of A Restless Mind.

== Honours ==
Year	Title
2016	Power Brands Hall of Fame
2014	Order of Civil Merit by the Spanish government
2010	Chevalier des Arts et des Lettres by the French government

== See also ==
- National Institute of Fashion Technology
- India Fashion Week
