= Svalikhita-jivani =

Autobiography

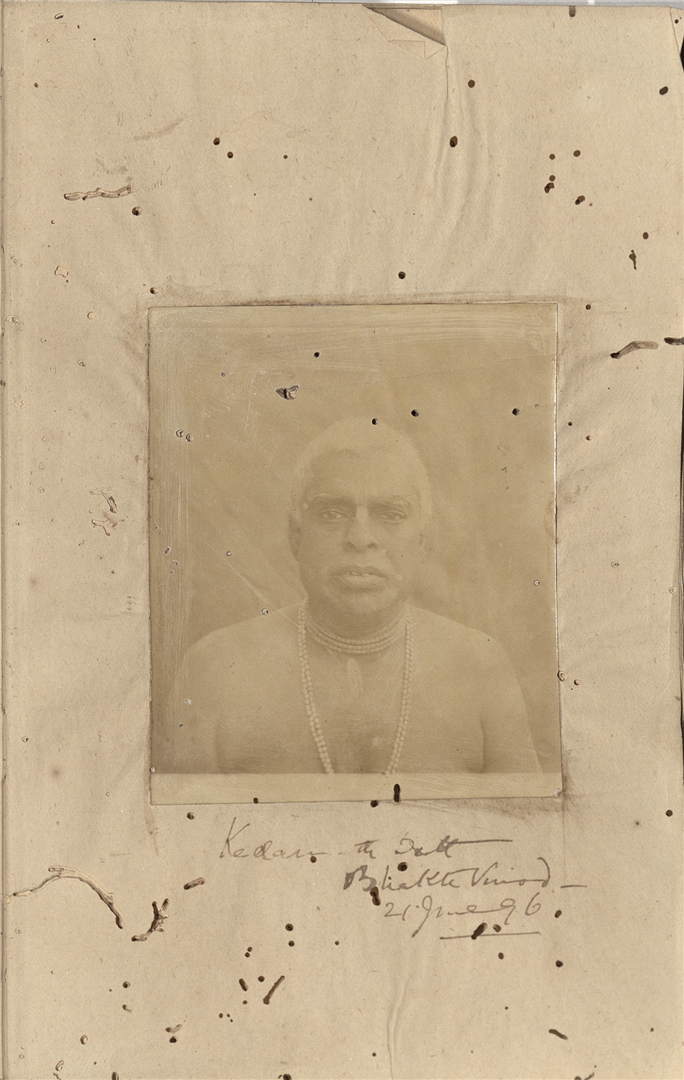
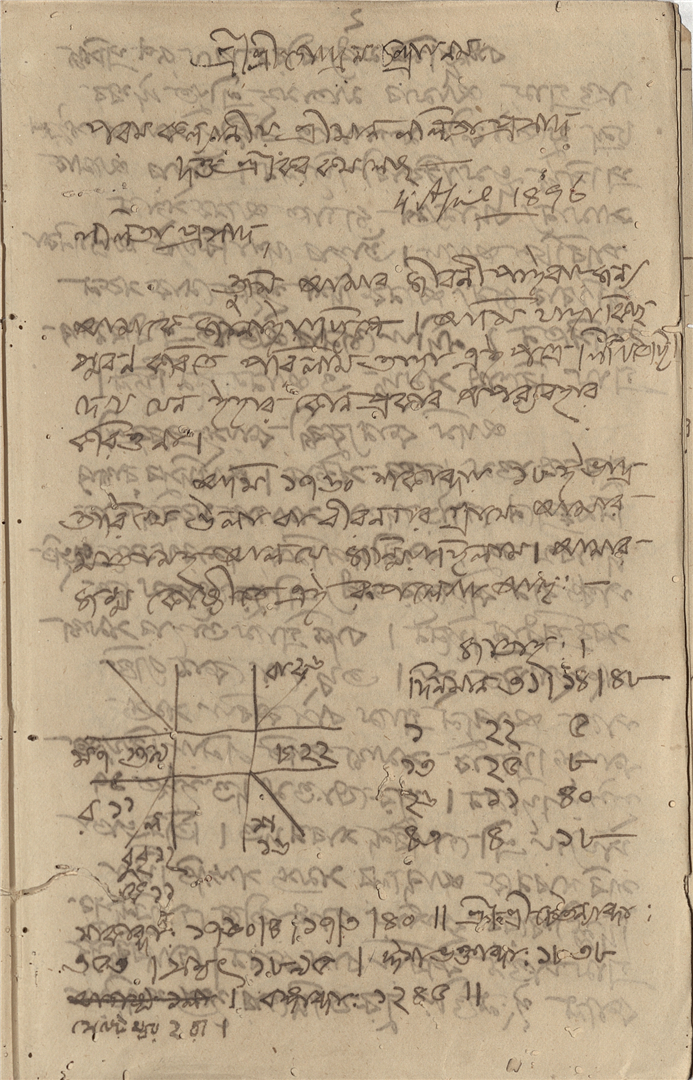
(left) Bhaktivinoda Thakur's photo with his autograph and (right) the first page of his original Svalikhita-jivani (1896).

Svalikhita-jivani is an autobiography written in 1896 by Kedarnatha Datta (also known as Bhaktivinoda Thakur), a prominent thinker of Bengali Renaissance and a leading philosopher, savant and spiritual reformer of Gaudiya Vaishnavism who effected its resurgence in India in late 19th and early 20th century and was hailed by contemporary scholars as the most influential Gaudiya Vaisnava leader of his time.

Written in Bengali on the request of Bhaktivinoda's son Lalita Prasad, Svalikhita-jivani gives a detailed autobiographical account that spanned most of his life from his birth in 1838 until retirement in 1894. The book was published by Lalita Prasad in 1916, after Bhaktivinoda's death.

In February 2023, a Bengali version of the Svalikhita Jivani was jointly published by the Bhaktivedanta Research Center and Dey’s Publishing. It was edited by Dr. Santanu Dey, who compared the original manuscript of the Svalikhita Jivani from 1896 with the first edition of the text by Lalita Prasad Datta from 1916 to eliminate textual discrepancies.

The introduction of the new edition places Kedarnath Datta's life and contributions within the historical context of his times. Additionally, the new edition contains a collection of rare photographs and a complete list of works authored by Bhaktivinod Thakur.

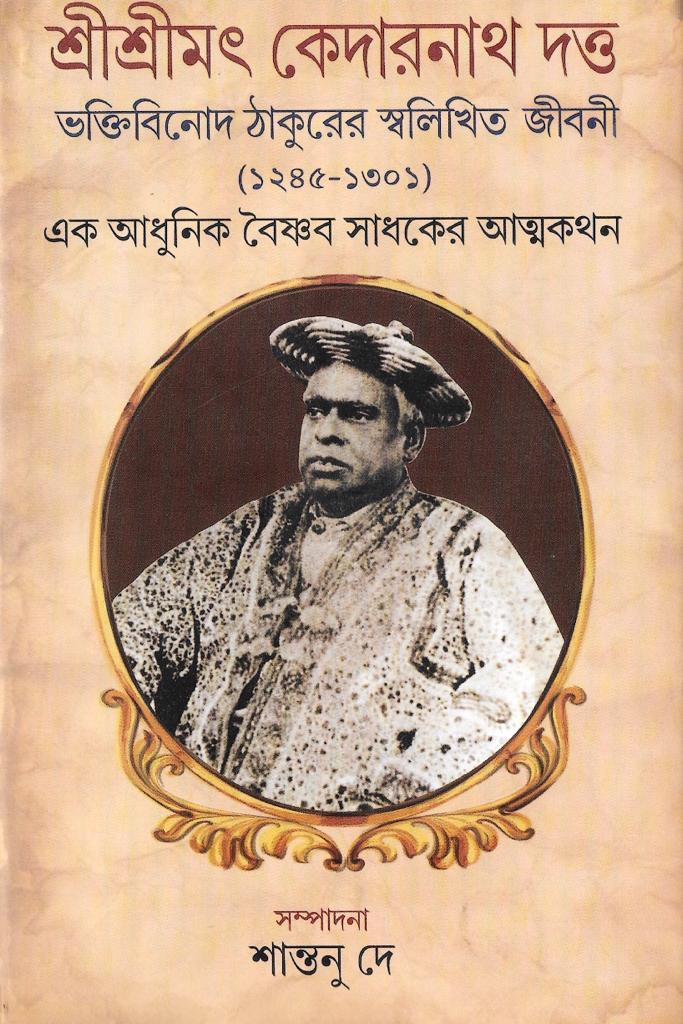
Bengali version of the Svalikhita Jivani

== Summary ==
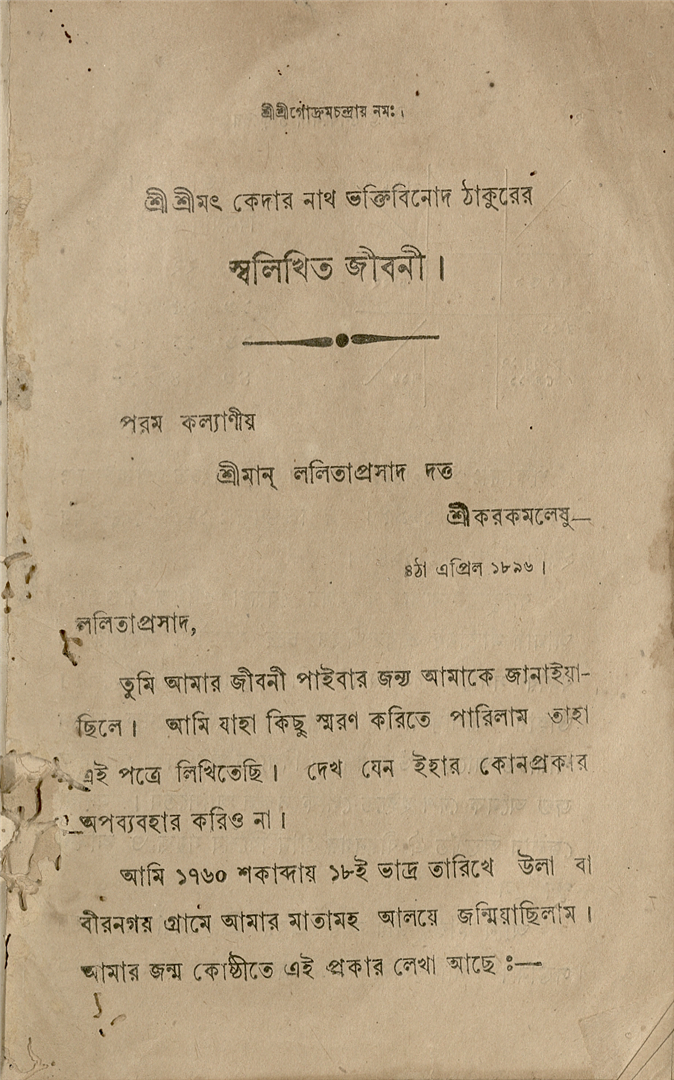
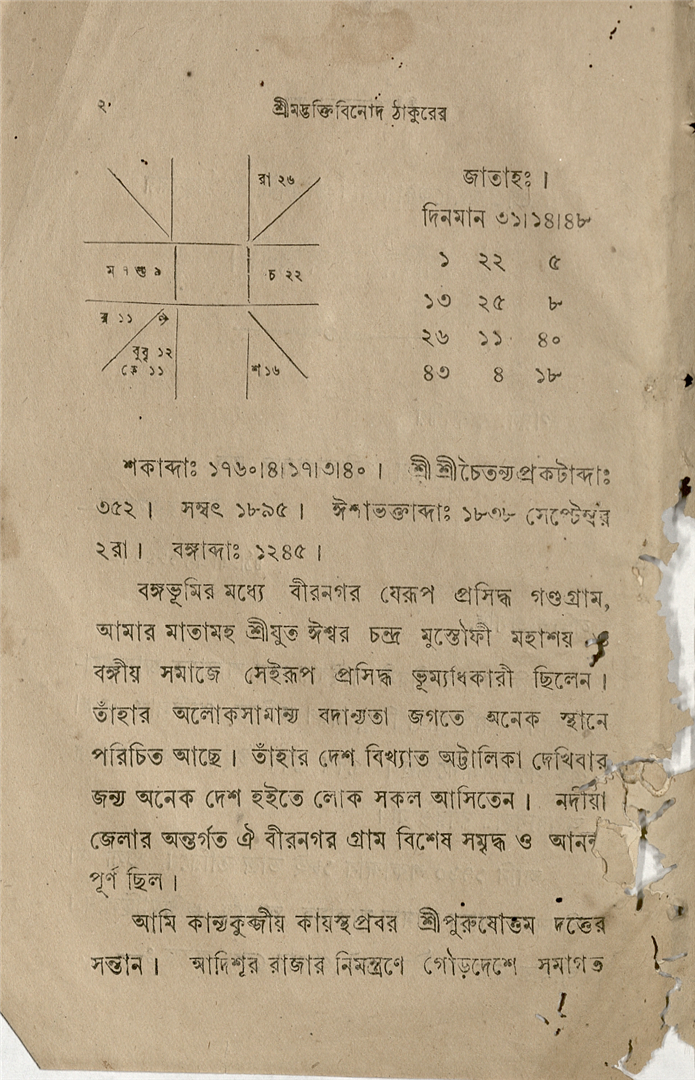
Pages one and two of Bhaktivinoda Thakur's Svalikhita-jivani printed in 1916.

On the request of his son Lalita Pras-Jivani 896 Bhaktivinoda wrote a detailed autobiography called Svalikhita-jivani that covered 56 years of his life from birth up until that time. Recounting his life's episodes with candour, Bhaktivinoda portrayed his path as full of financial struggle, health issues, internal doubts and insecurity, and deep introspection that gradually led him, sometimes in convoluted ways, to the deliberate and mature decision of accepting Caitanya Mahaprabhu and his teachings as his final goal. Bhaktivinoda did not display much concern for how this candid account would reflect on his status as an established Gaudiya Vaisnava spiritual leader with a large following, in the eyes of thousands of his intellectual bhadralok disciples. It is telling that Bhaktivinoda never refers to himself as feeling or displaying any special spiritual acumen, saintlihood, powers, or charisma – anything worthy of veneration. Rather, the honest, almost self-deprecating narrative portrays him as a genuine, exceptionally humble and modest man. The book was published by Lalita Prasad in 1916 after Bhaktivinoda's passing.

== See also ==
- Bhaktivinoda Thakur bibliography
