= Bhaktivinoda Thakur =

Indian spiritual leader (1838–1914)

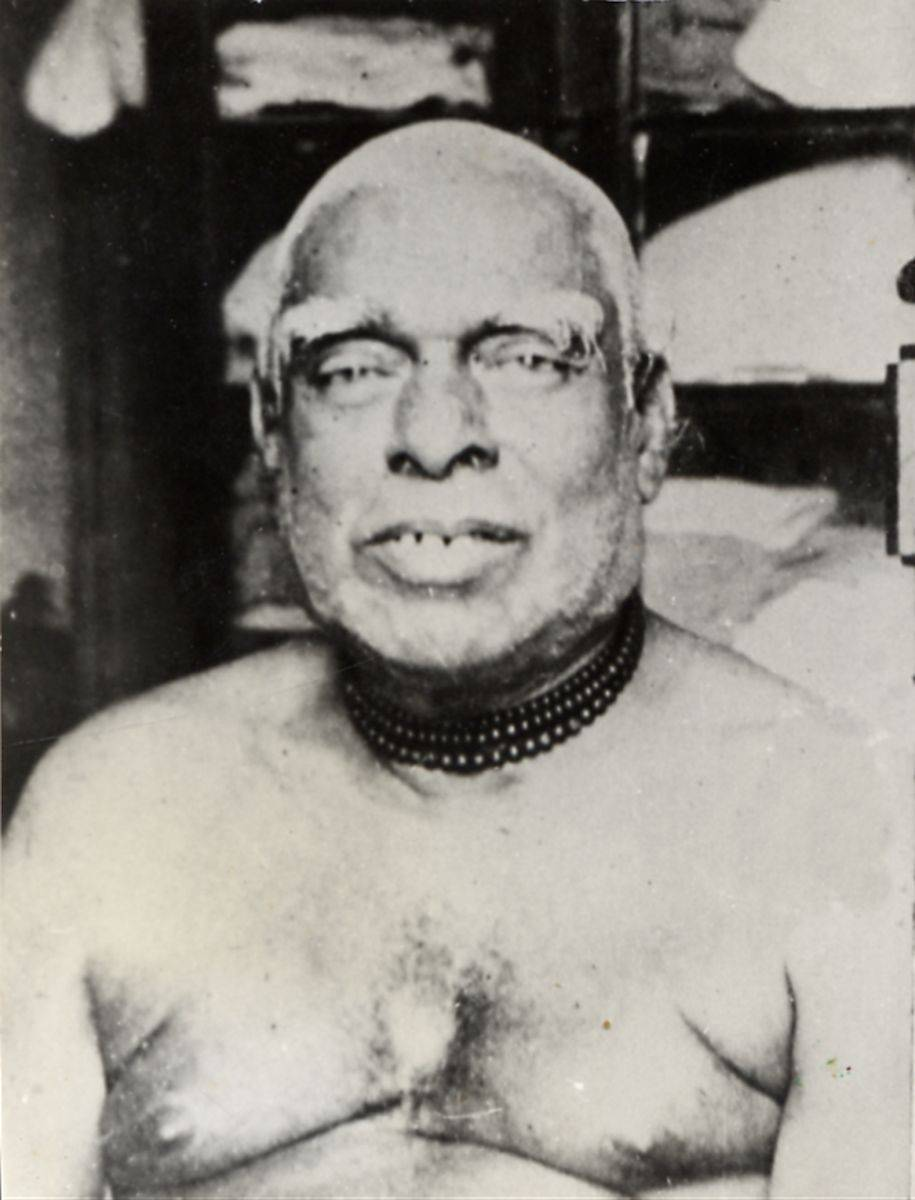
- Bhaktivinoda Thakur, c. 1910

Personal life
- Born: Kedarnath Datta; 2 September 1838 Birnagar, India
- Died: 23 June 1914 (aged 75) Calcutta, India
- Spouse: Shaymani Devi (m. 1849–1861) Bhagavati Devi (m. 1861–1914)
- Children: Bhaktisiddhanta Sarasvati, Lalita Prasad,12 other children
- Notable work(s): Krishna-samhita, Caitanya-siksamrita, Jaiva-dharma, Svalikhita-jivani. See bibliography
- Relatives: Narottama Dasa (distant ancestor), Kashiprasad Ghosh (maternal uncle)
- Honors: Bhaktivinoda, "the seventh goswami"

Religious life
- Religion: Hinduism
- Philosophy: Achintya Bheda Abheda
- Sect: Gaudiya Vaishnavism

Religious career
- Teacher: Bipin Bihari Goswami (dīkṣā guru according to all lineages and śikṣā guru according to lineage of Lalita Prasad Dutt and Bhaktitirtha Thakur), Jagannath Dasa Babaji (śikṣā guru according to the Gaudiya Math)
- Influenced: Bhaktisiddhanta Sarasvati
- Yasomati-nandana (Sri Nama-kirtana) A Bengali bhajan by Bhaktivinoda Thakur from Gitavali (1893). Music and singing by A.C. Bhaktivedanta Swami (ca.1970). (11:41)

Bhaktivinoda Thakur (IAST: Bhakti-vinoda Ṭhākura, Bengali pronunciation: [bʱɔktibinodo tʰakur]) (2 September 1838 – 23 June 1914), born Kedarnath Datta (Kedāra-nātha Datta, Bengali: [kedɔrnɔtʰ dɔtto]), was an Indian Hindu philosopher, guru and spiritual reformer of Gaudiya Vaishnavism who effected its resurgence in India in late 19th and early 20th century and was called by contemporary scholars as a Gaudiya Vaishnava leader of his time. He, along with his son Bhaktisiddhanta Sarasvati, is also credited with initiating the propagation of Gaudiya Vaishnavism in the West and its global spread.

He tackled the task of reconciling Western reason and traditional belief, by accommodating both modern critical analysis and Hindu mysticism in his writings. Kedarnath's spiritual quest led him at the age of 29 to become a follower of Chaitanya Mahaprabhu (1486–1533). He dedicated himself to the study and practice of Chaitanya's teachings, emerging as a leader within the Chaitanya Vaishnava movement in Bengal.

In his later years Bhaktivinoda founded and conducted nama-hatta – a travelling preaching program that spread theology and practice of Chaitanya throughout rural and urban Bengal, by means of discourses, printed materials and Bengali songs of his own composition. He also opposed what he saw as apasampradayas, or numerous distortions of the original Chaitanya teachings. He is credited with the rediscovery of the lost site of Chaitanya's birth, in Mayapur near Nabadwip, which he commemorated with a prominent temple.

Bhaktivinoda Thakur led the spread of Chaitanya's teachings in the West, in 1880 sending copies of his works to Ralph Waldo Emerson in the United States and to Reinhold Rost in Europe.

The revival of Gaudiya Vaishnavism effected by Bhaktivinoda spawned one of India's preaching missions of the early 20th century, the Gaudiya Matha, headed by his son and spiritual heir, Bhaktisiddhanta Sarasvati. Bhaktisiddhanta's disciple A.C. Bhaktivedanta Swami (1896–1977) continued his guru's Western mission when in 1966 in the United States he founded ISKCON, or the Hare Krishna movement, which then spread Gaudiya Vaishnavism globally.

== Bengali Renaissance and the bhadralok ==
Kedarnath Datta belonged to the kayastha community of Bengali intellectual gentry that lived during the Bengal Renaissance and attempted to rationalise their traditional Hindu beliefs and customs.

Kedarnath's birth in 1838 occurred during the period of the history of Bengal marked by the emergence and influence of the bhadralok community. The bhadralok, refers to "gentle or respectable people", was a class of Bengalis (Hindus), who served the British administration in occupations requiring Western education and proficiency in English and other languages. Exposed to and influenced by the Western values of the British, including the latter's condescending attitude towards cultural and religious traditions of India, the bhadralok started calling into question and reassessing the tenets of their own religion and customs. Their attempts to rationalise and modernise Hinduism in order to reconcile it with the Western outlook gave rise to a historical period called the Bengali Renaissance.

This trend led to a perception, both in India and in the West, of modern Hinduism as being equivalent to Advaita Vedanta, a conception of the divine as devoid of form and individuality that was hailed by its proponents as the "perennial philosophy" and "the mother of religions". As a result, the other schools of Hinduism, including bhakti, were gradually relegated in the minds of the Bengali Hindu middle-class to obscurity, and seen as a "reactionary and fossilized jumble of empty rituals and idolatrous practices."

== Early period (1838–1858): student ==
=== Birth and childhood ===
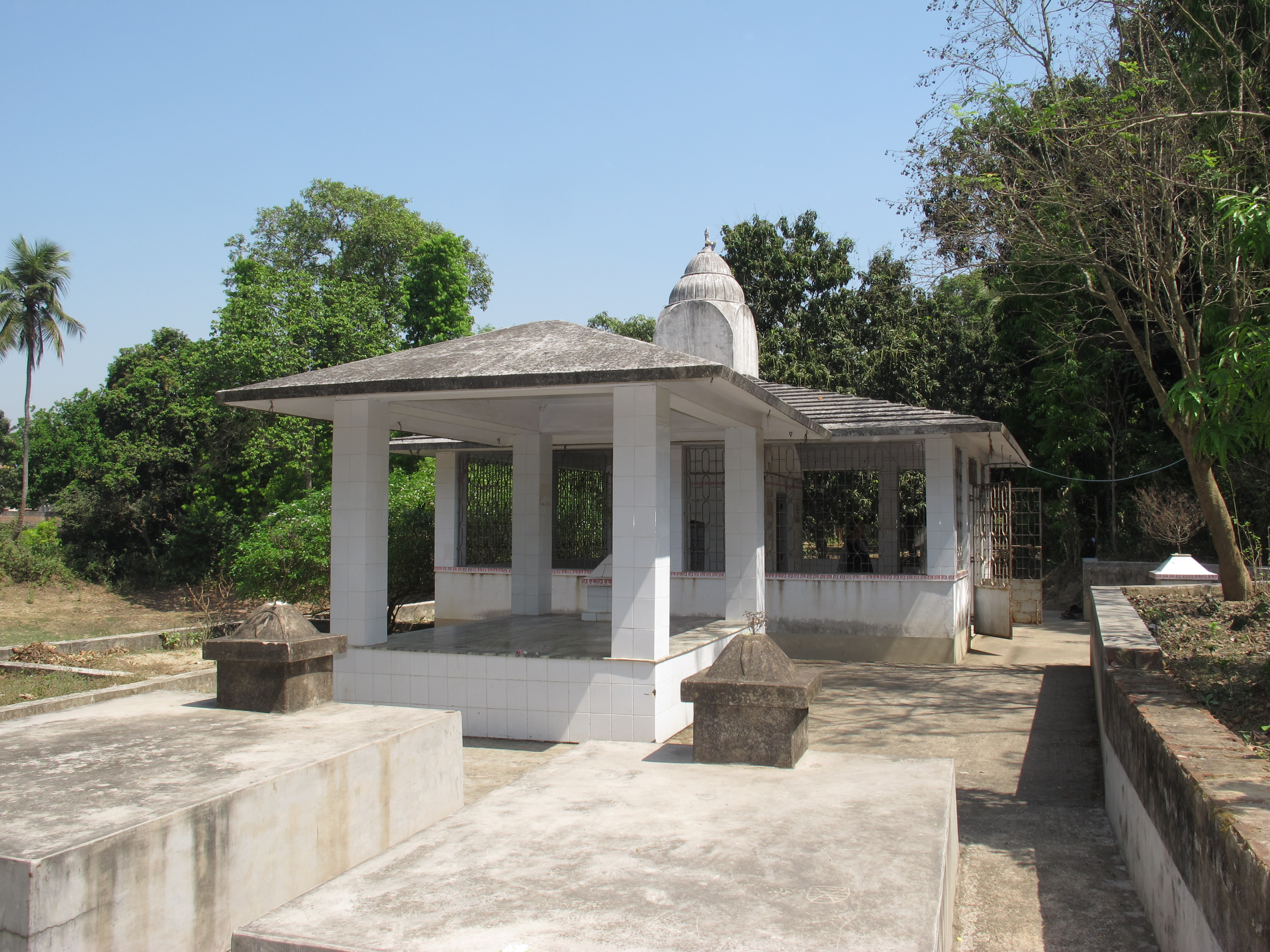
Bhaktivinoda Thakur's memorial at his birthplace in Birnagar, West Bengal

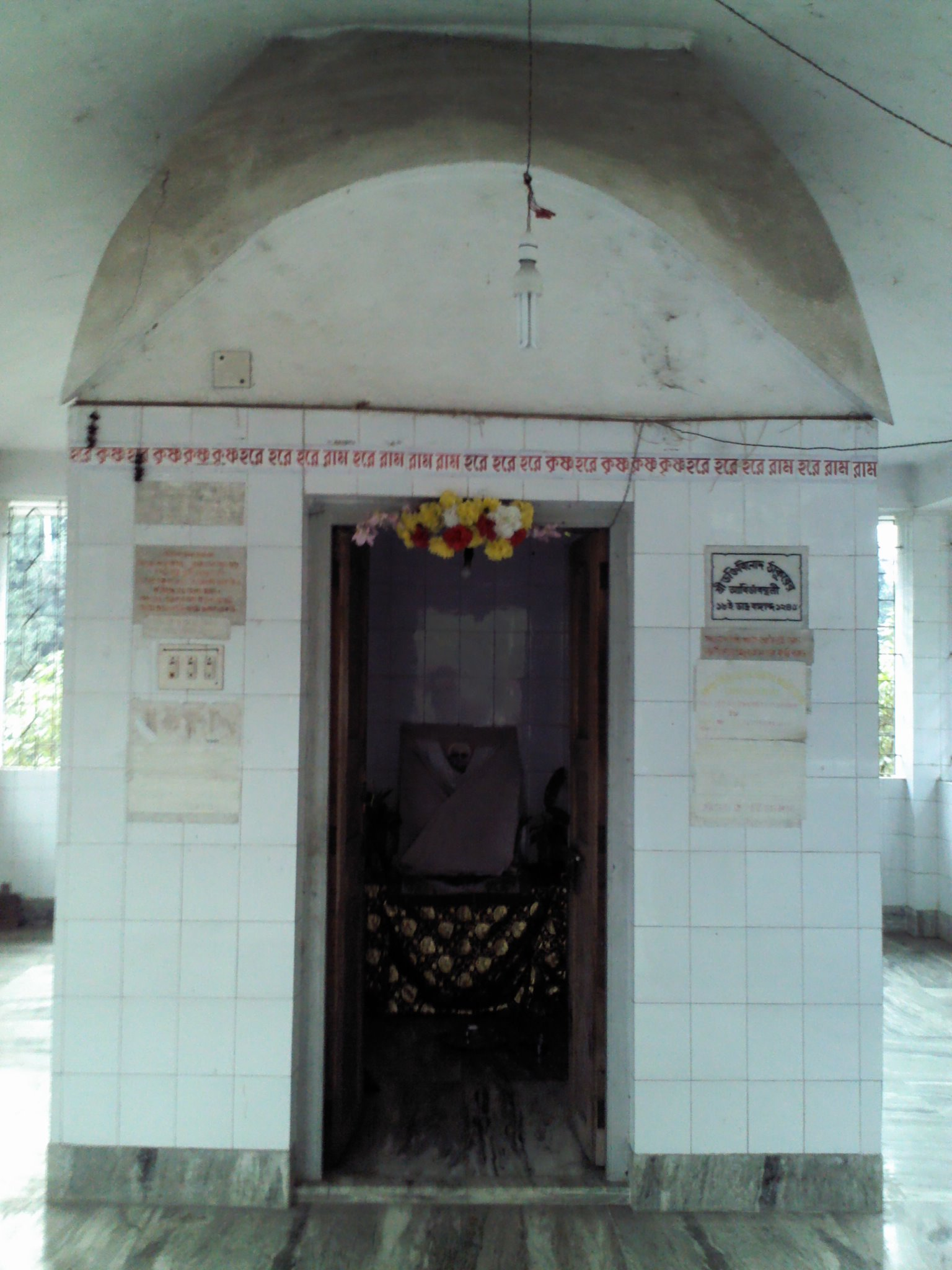
A shrine at the actual site of birth

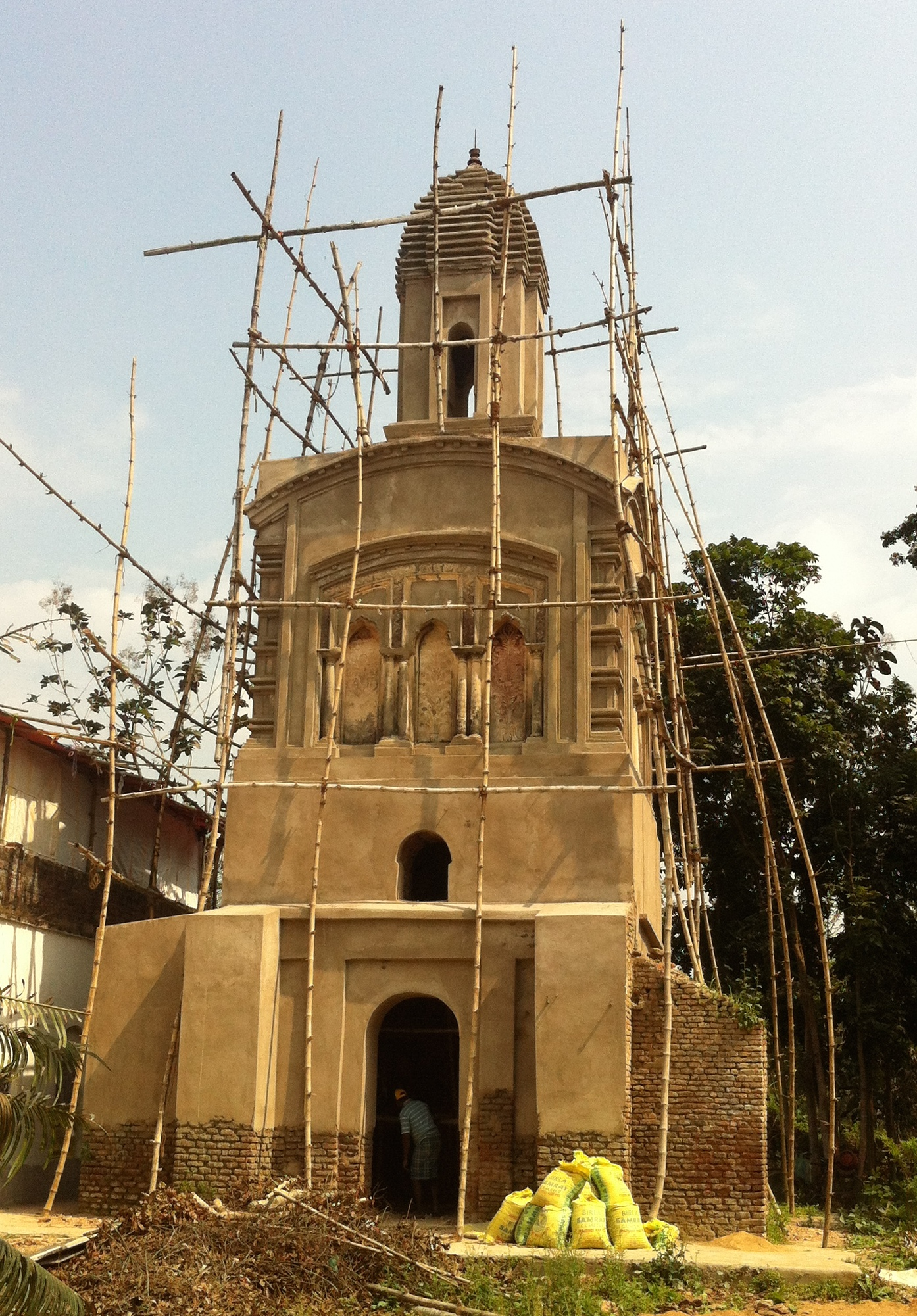
The entrance to Kedamath Datta's matemal home in Birnagar (Ula), West Bengal under renovation. 2014

Kedarnath was born on 2 September 1838 in the village of Ula (presently Birnagar) in Bengal, some 100 kilometres (62 miles) north of modern-day Kolkata. Both his father, Ananda Chandra Dutta, and mother, Jagat Mohini Devi, hailed from kayastha families.

After a village schooling, he continued his education at Hindu College in Calcutta, where he acquainted himself with contemporary Western philosophy and theology. There he became a close associate of literary and intellectual figures of the Bengali Renaissance, such as Ishwar Chandra Vidyasagar, Bankim Chandra Chattopadhyay, and Sisir Kumar Ghosh.' In his youth he spent time researching and comparing various religious and philosophical systems, both Indian and Western, with a view of finding among them a comprehensive, authentic and intellectually satisfying path. At 18, he began a teaching career in rural areas of Bengal and Orissa until he became an employee with the British Raj in the Judicial Service, from which he retired in 1894 as District Magistrate.

From the time of Chaitanya Mahaprabhu (1486–1533), the paternal Datta lineage were Vaishnavas and counted among their ranks Krishnananda, an associate of Nityananda Prabhu. Kedarnath's mother, Jagan Mohini Devi (born Mitra), was a descendant of Rameshwar Mitra, a zamindar (landowner) of the 18th century. Kedarnath's great-grandfather (along with many other 18th century Dattas), Ramtanu Datta, converted to Shaktism and Durga-Kali worship. Kedaranath in his autobiography Svalikhita-jivani refers to his father, Anand Chandra Dutta, as a "straightforward, clean, religious man" and describes his mother as "a sober woman possessed of many unique qualities".

Kedarnath was the third of six children of Anand Chandra and Jagat Mohini, preceded by older brothers Abhaykali (died before Kedarnath's birth) and Kaliprasanna and followed by three younger siblings: sister Hemlata and brothers Haridas and Gauridas. Kedarnath evoked affection of his mother, who prayed for his survival.

Prior to his birth, financial circumstances had forced his parents to relocate from Calcutta to Ula, where he was born and grew up in the palace of his maternal grandfather, Ishwar Chandra Mustauphi, a landowner known for his generosity.

From the age of five, Kedarnath attended the village school in Ula. Later, when an English school opened there, he showed interest in the English language, attending the classes during lunch, that the headmaster of the school convinced Anand Chandra to let the boy study there. At the age of seven Kadarnath was transferred to another English school in Krishnanagar.

In the following years Kedarnath's family faced a series of calamities. All three of his brothers died of cholera, soon followed by their father, Anand Chandra. The financial situation of his widowed mother worsened as his maternal grandfather, Ishwar Chandra, incurred huge debts due to the oppressive Permanent Settlement Act and ended up bankrupt. In 1850, when Kedarnath was 12, in accordance with the upper-class Hindu customs Jagat Mohini married him to a five-year-old Shaymani Mitra of Ranaghat, hoping to sever Kedarnath's connection with the ill fate of his own family and replace it with the good karma of the in-laws. Soon after the wedding Ishwar Chandra died, leaving the responsibility for his troubled estate on the widow with two young children. Kedarnath recalls:

Everybody thought that my mother had a lot of money and jewelry, so no one would help. All her wealth was lost except for a few properties. There was so much debt and I was full of anxiety. I was unqualified to look after the affairs of the estate. My grandfather's house was huge. The guards were few and I was afraid of thieves at night so I had to give the guards bamboo sticks to carry.

These hardships made Kedarnath question the meaning of life and ponder over reasons for human sufferings. He felt unconvinced by conventional explanations and started doubting the reality of the many Hindu gods and goddesses worshiped in village temples. Exposed to contradictory views ranging from religious beliefs to tantric practices, exorcism, superstitions and atheism, Kedarnath found himself in a state of disappointment and philosophical confusion. It was at that time that an encounter with an old woman who advised him to chant the name of Rama made an impact on him, planting the seed of the Vaishnava faith that he maintained throughout his life.

New challenges and responsibilities caused Kedarnath to visit Calcutta for the first time. The trip, further developed his curiosity for European life and customs. Back in Ula he continued struggling to maintain the property inherited from his grandfather. This took a toll on his education. Finally, in 1852 his maternal uncle, Kashiprasad Ghosh, a famous poet and newspaper editor, visited Ula and, impressed with the talented boy, convinced Jagat Mohini to send Kedarnath to Calcutta to further his studies. In November 1852, leaving his mother and sister behind in Ula, Kedarnath moved to Ghosh's house on Beadon Street in the middle of Calcutta.

=== Education in Calcutta ===
Calcutta was a multicultural city, different from Kedarnath's experience. His maternal uncle Kashiprasad Ghosh, a graduate of the Hindu College of Calcutta, was a champion of Westernisation, the editor of the English-language Hindu Intelligencer, a journal which propagated the ideas of the bhadralok, and a patriotic poet praised even by the British.

Kedarnath stayed with Kashiprasad Ghosh until 1858 and became steeped in the lifestyle of the bhadralok and immersed in studying a range of Western philosophical, poetic, political, and religious texts. Kadarnath studied at the Hindu Charitable Institute between 1852 and 1856. There he met one of the bhadralok Hindu intellectuals of the time, Ishwar Chandra Vidyasagar (1820–1891), who became his tutor, his mentor, and a lifelong friend.

While excelling in his studies, especially in the English language and writing, Kedarnath started writing his own poems and articles. Exposed to and influenced by the views of the acquaintances of Kashiprasad who frequented his home, Kristo Das Pal, Shambhu Mukhopadhyay, Baneshwar Vidyalankar, and others – Kedarnath started regularly contributing to the Hindu Intelligencer, critiquing contemporary social and political issues from a bhadralok viewpoint. Eventually, Kedarnath felt confident enough in his studies and in 1856 enrolled in the Hindu College (Calcutta) where for the next two years he continued his studies under Ishwar Chandra Vidyasagar in the company of remarkable classmates such as Keshub Chandra Sen, Nabagopal Mitra, and the elder brothers of Rabindranath Tagore: Satyendranath and Ganendranath. Becoming involved in the intellectual values of the bhadralok community, Kedarnath along with his classmates started taking public-speaking lessons from the British parliamentarian and abolitionist George Thompson (1804–1878). At the same time, Kedarnath published his first major literary work, a two-volume historical poem titled The Poriade, which earned him both a name as a poet and some income.

Kedarnath's health deteriorated due to poor drinking water and the challenging environment of Calcutta. He made regular visits to his mother and sister in Ula for recovery and convalescence. He was treated by a fakir physician of the leather worker caste who belonged to the heterodox Kartābhajā sect of Chaitanyite Vaishnavism. Kedarnath soon took initiation from the fakīr's guru who gave Kedarnath a Krishna mantra and encouraged him to become a vegetarian; later in life Kedarnath theologically criticised the Kartabhajas but acknowledged their influence in moving him towards Gaudiya Vaishnavism. However, when in 1856 (Note: Other sources give 1857 as the year of the epidemic, but that contradicts the age of 17 cited by Bhaktivinoda in Svalikhita-jivani) an outbreak of cholera wiped out the whole village of Ula, killing his sister Hemlata and sparing his mother, Kedarnath took her along with his grandmother to Calcutta for good. The devastation of Ula marked a turning point in Kedarnath's attitude to life. He writes:

At that time I was seventeen years old and I had to face terrible hardships. There was no money. I could hardly speak to anyone. Everyone thought that my mother had a lakh [100,000] of rupees, no one believed that we were poor. I saw no hope. My mind became apathetic, the house was empty. I had no strength and my heart was dying of pain.

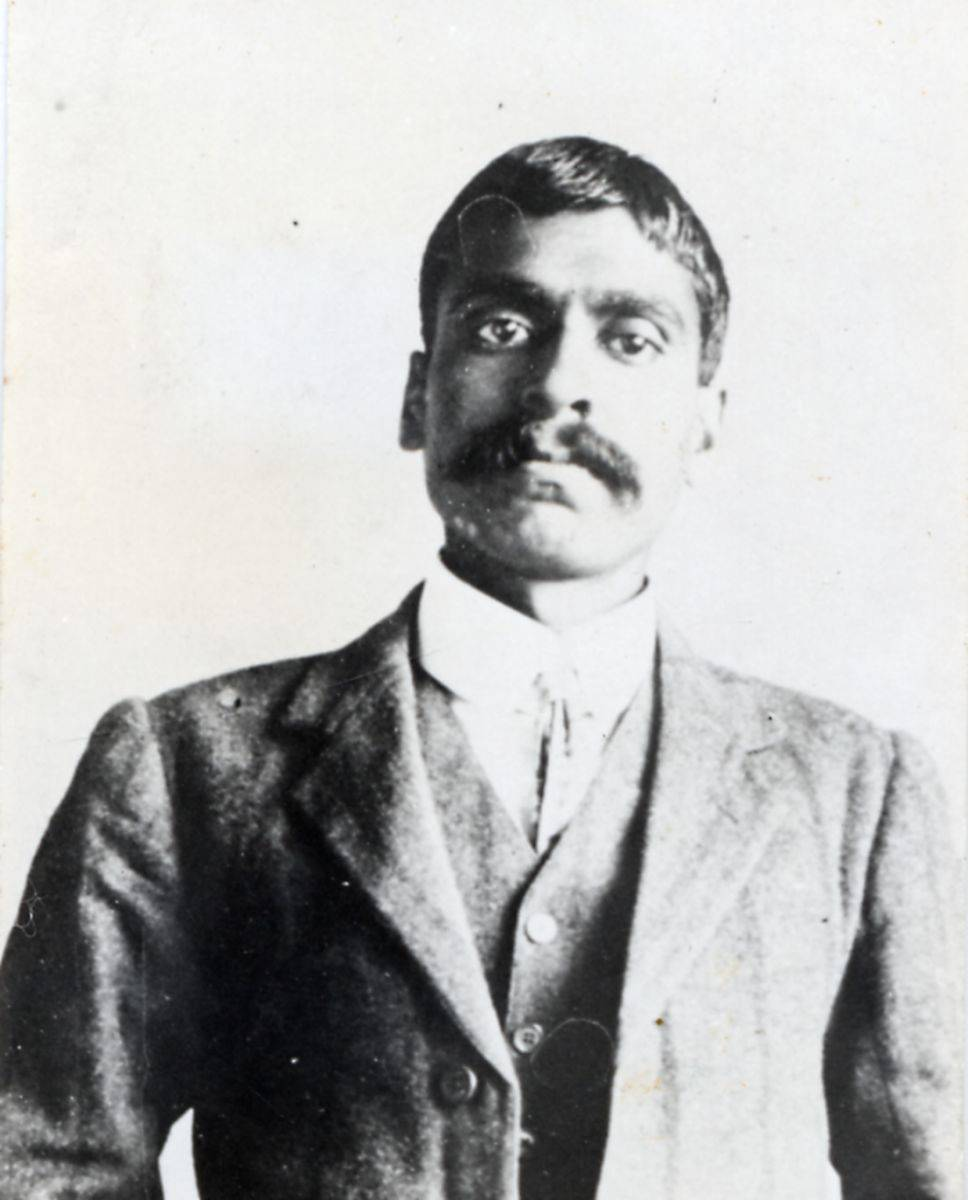
Kedarnath Datta as a student ca. 1858

Finding himself disoriented, he sought shelter in his friendship with the Tagore brothers. There he overcame his crisis and started moving towards a religious rather than social and political outlook on life. Along with Dvijendranath Tagore, Kedarnath started studying Sanskrit and the theological writings of such authors as Kant, Goethe, Hegel, Swedenborg, Hume, Voltaire, and Schopenhauer; for a time he was attracted to the Brahmo Samaj and its monotheism before it eventually lost its appeal. At the same time, Kedarnath daily met with Charles Dall, a Unitarian minister from the American Unitarian Association of Boston posted to Calcutta for propagating Unitarian ideas among the educated Bengalis. Under Dall's guidance, Kedarnath studied the Bible and the Unitarian writings of Channing, Emerson, Parker, and others. While developing a faith in Jesus and a fascination for the liberalism and syncretism of Unitarian religious teachings, the young Kedarnath also studied George Sale's translation of the Qur'an.

Dire financial strain and obligations to maintain his young wife and aging mother caused Kedarnath to look for employment. Finding a well-paid job in Calcutta – especially a job compatible with his high ethical values (Note: Biographers cite an instance when Kedarnath quit a well-paid job that involved bargain due to feeling discomfort with having to "cheat the whole seller for profit".) – was nearly impossible. After a few unsuccessful stints as a teacher and after incurring a debt, Kedarnath along with his mother and wife accepted the invitation of Rajballabh, his paternal grandfather in Orissa, and in the spring of 1858 left for the Orissan village of Chutimangal.

== Middle period (1858–1874): working years ==
=== Teaching in Orissa (1858–1866) ===
In Chutimangal, Kedarnath Datta began his career as an English teacher – first at the local village school, and then, after passing a qualifying examination, at a school in Cuttack. From 1862 until 1865 he served as the first headmaster of Bhadrak High School (currently Zilla School) in Bhadrak. His finances improved, allowing him to devote more time to studying, writing, and lecturing. This helped establish him as an intellectual and cultural voice within the local bhadralok community, and soon a following of his own formed, consisting of students drawn to his discourses and personal tutorship on religious and philosophical topics.

In August 1860 his first son, Annada Datta, was born. Ten months later, Kedarnath's wife died. Widowed and with an infant to care for at twenty-three, Kedarnath married Bhagavati Devi, a daughter of Gangamoy Roy of Jakpore. She become his companion and the mother of his other thirteen children. (Note: Kedarnath Datta's fourteen children are: with Shaymani: (1) Annada Prasad, son (1860); with Bhagavati Devi: (1) Saudamani, daughter (1864); (2) Kadambani, daughter (1867); (3) son died early, name unknown (1868); (4) Radhika Prasad, son (1870); (5) Kamala Prasad, son (1872); (6) Bimala Prasad, son (1874); (7) Barada Prasad, son (1877); (8) Biraja Prasad, son (1878); (9) Lalita Prasad, son (1880); (10) Krishna Vinodini, daughter (1884); (11) Shyam Sarojini, daughter (1886); (12) Hari Pramodini, daughter (1888); (13) Shailaja Prasad, son (1891).) After a short tenure as the head clerk at the Bardhaman revenue collector's office, Kedarnath left the position and accepted a clerical post elsewhere.

These external events as well as the internal conflict between morality and need moved Kedarnath towards introspection in search for a more appealing concept of God, as accepted in Christianity (towards which he leaned) and Vaishnavism. A meeting with a jāti Vaishnava in Midnapore exposed Kedarnath to Chaitanya and Vaishnavism. Kedarnath tried to acquire a copy of Chaitanya Caritamrita and the Bhagavata Purana, principal scriptures for Gaudiya Vaishnavas, but failed. The death of his wife greatly affected him, and he struggled to reconcile his intellectual leanings towards the formlessness of God and his emotional prayers to a personal deity.

This period was also marked with Kedarnath's budding literary gift. Taking advantage of the tranquility of his new clerical job, he composed the Bengali poems Vijanagrama and Sannyasi, lauded for their poetic meter, which incorporated the style of Milton and Byron into Bengali verse. He also authored an article on Vaishnavism as well as a book, Our Wants.

As Bhagavati Devi gave birth to Kedarnath's second child, daughter Saudhamani (1864), the need to secure a more stable income for his growing family made Kedarnath seek a job with the British government.

=== Government service (1866–1893) ===
In February 1866 Kedarnath Datta received, with a friend's help, a position with the Registrar's office as a "Special Deputy Registrar of Assurances with Powers of a Deputy Magistrate and Deputy Collector" in Chhapra in the Saran district of Bihar. In colonial Bengal a job at the executive government service, staffed by the bhadralok (except for the top management tier, occupied by the British), was the coveted achievement. It ensured one's financial security, social status, and protected retirement. During the next twenty-eight years, Kedarnath rose through the ranks of civil service from sixth grade to second grade, which entailed authority. (Note: Kedarnath Datta in Svalikhita-jivani confesses to the discomfort of holding the position of authority that made his subordinates ingratiate themselves to him, out of fear and intimidation, by gifts and singing.) Kedarnath gradually established himself with the British authorities as a responsible and efficient officer and a man of integrity. The course of his government service took him and his growing family to twenty different locations in Bihar, Bengal, and Orissa. This allowed him to study different cultures, languages, and religions. He also showed himself a linguistic savant, within a short time learning Urdu and Persian, required for his government duties. He also mastered Sanskrit for his Vaishnava pursuits, enough to be able to read the Bhagavata Purana with traditional commentaries and to write his own Sanskrit poetry.

When Kedarnath suffered from prolonged bouts of fever and colitis, (Note: In Svalikhita-jivani Kedarnath attributes his chronic intestinal disorders to his non-vegetarian diet up until his initiation in 1880, even while already practising Vaishnavism that strictly prohibits meat-eating.) he took advantage of the paid sick leave to visit Mathura and Vrindavana – sacred places for Gaudiya Vaishnavas.

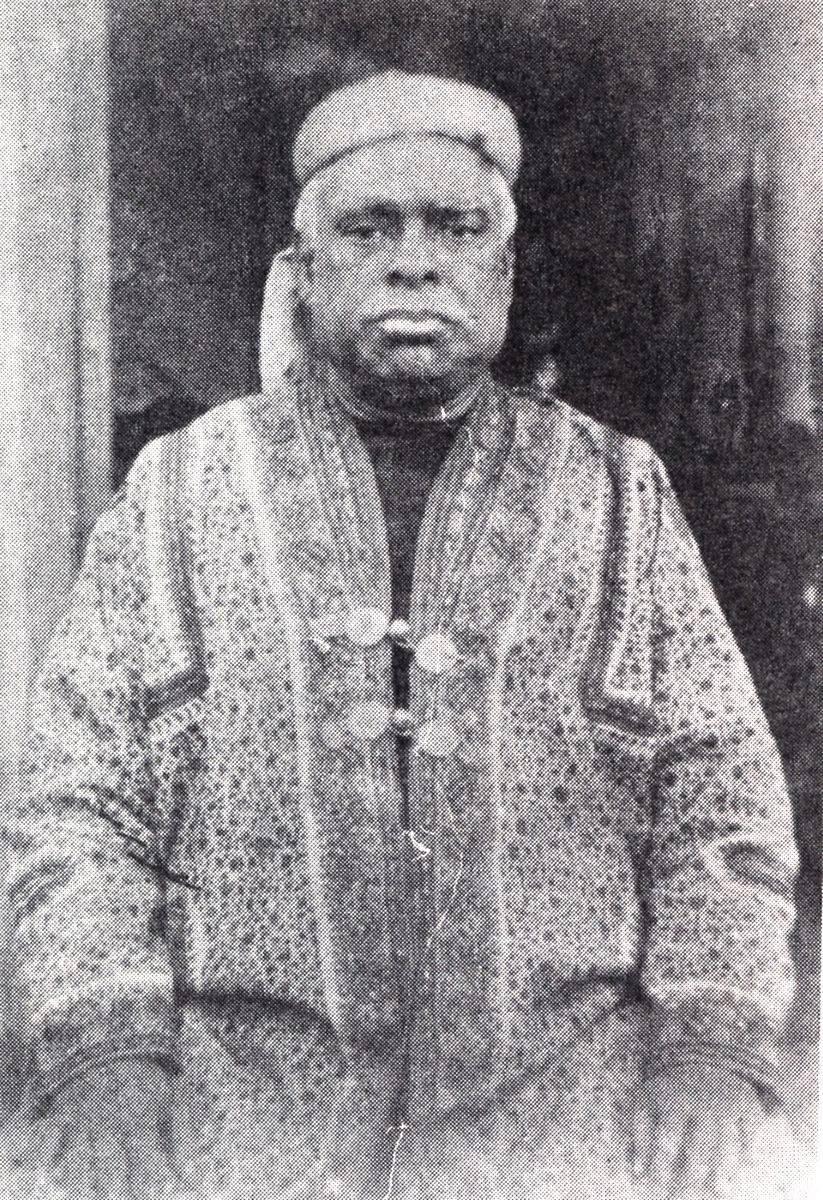
Kedarnath Datta in official magistrate dress, late 1880s

In 1868, Kedarnath became Deputy Magistrate in Dinajpur, a city with a strong Vaishnava community. After an eight-year search, in 1868 he found a copy of Chaitanya's biography Chaitanya Caritamrita by Krishnadasa Kaviraja and a translation of the Bhagavata Purana. He became appreciative of Chaitanya's teaching but struggled to reconcile it with the Christian and Unitarian-influenced bhadraloka perception of Krishna, Chaitanya's God described in the Bhagavata Purana, as "basically a wrong-doer." He concluded that both faith and reason have their respective, complementary places in religious experience, and neither can be ousted from it altogether. Kedarnath describes the transformation he went through while reading the long sought-after scripture:

My first reading of Caitanya Caritamrita created some faith in Caitanya. On the second reading I understood that Caitanya was unequalled, but l doubted how such a good scholar with so high a level of prema could recommend the worship of Krishna, who had such a questionable character. I was amazed, and I thought about this in detail. Afterwards, I humbly prayed to God, "O Lord, please give me the understanding to know the secret of this matter." The mercy of God is without limit and so I soon understood. From then on I believed that Caitanya was God. I often spoke with many vairagis to understand Vaishnava dharma. From childhood the seeds of faith for Vaishnava dharma had been planted within my heart and now they had sprouted. I experienced anuraga (spiritual yearning) and day and night I read and thought about Krishna.

Accepting Chaitanya as the final goal of his intellectual and spiritual quest, Kedarnath started delivering public lectures on his teachings, culminating in his speech The Bhagavat: Its Philosophy, Ethics and Theology – his first public announcement of his newly found religious allegiance. In The Bhagavat, delivered in English but directed at both the Western cultural conquest and the bhadralok that conquest influenced, Kedarantha attempted to reconcile modern thought and Vaishnava orthodoxy and to restore the Bhagavata to its preeminent position in Hindu philosophy. His newfound inspiration in the teachings of Chaitanya and the Bhagavata made Kedarnath receive his next job transfer to Jagannath Puri as a blessing – Puri was Chaitanya's residence for most of his life, and the shelter of the principal Vaishnava shrine, the Temple of Jagannath.

=== Service in Puri (1870–1875) ===
Following the annexation of the state of Orissa by Britain in 1803, the British force commander in India, Marquess Wellesley, ordered by decree "the utmost degree of accuracy and vigilance" in protecting the security of the Jagannath temple and in respecting religious sentiments of its worshipers. The policy was followed to the point that the British army escorted Hindu religious processions. However, under the pressure of Christian missionaries both in India and in Britain, in 1863 this policy was lifted and the temple management entrusted to the care of the local brahmanas, which soon led to its deterioration.

When Kedarnath was posted to Puri in 1870, he was given the charge to oversee law and order in the pilgrimage site, as well as to provide pilgrims with food, accommodation, and medical assistance on festival occasions. The government also deputed Kedarnath as a law enforcement officer to thwart the Atibadis, a heterodox Vaishnava sect that conspired to overthrow the British and was led by a self-proclaimed avatar, Bishkishan, a task that Kedarnath accomplished.

However, while busy with governmental assignments, Kedarnath dedicated his off-duty time to nurturing his newly acquired inspiration for Gaudiya Vaishnavism. He started mastering Sanskrit under the tutelage of local pandits and absorbed himself in intense study of Chaitanya Caritamrita, the Bhagavata Purana with the commentary of Sridhara Svami, and the seminal philosophical treatises of the Gaudiya Vaishnava canon such as the Sat Sandarbhas by Jiva Goswami (c.1513–1598), Bhakti-rasamrta-sindhu by Rupa Goswami (1489–1564), and the Govinda Bhashya commentary by Baladeva Vidyabhushana (?−1768) on the Brahma Sutras. Kedarnath also started searching for Gaudiya Vaishnava manuscripts and writing on the subject of Gaudiya Vaishnavism, authoring and publishing Datta-kaustubha and a number of Sanskrit verses, and commenced a major literary work, Krishna-samhita.

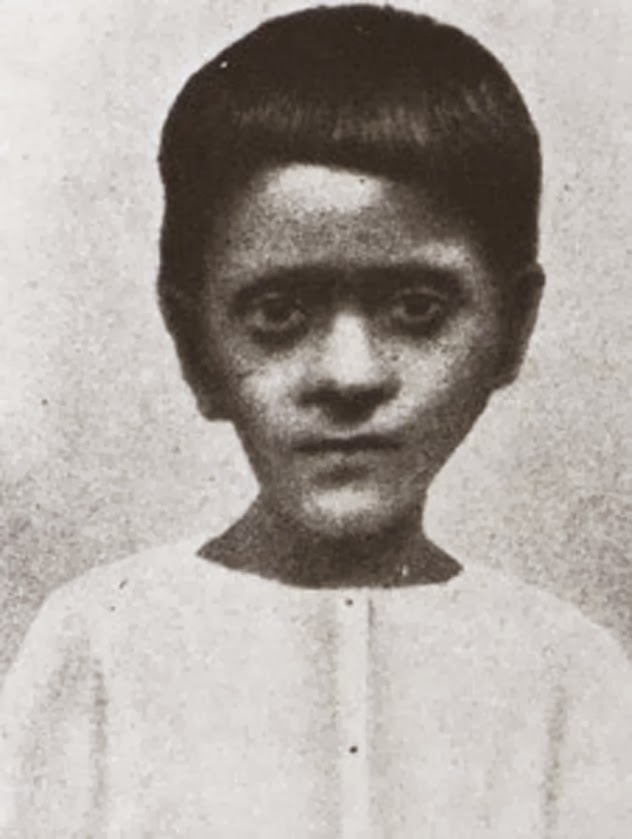
Kedarnath Datta's seventh child Bimala Prasad, age 7 (1881)

Soon Kedarnath formed a society called Bhagavat Samsad, consisting of the local bhadralok who were eager listen to his exposition of Gaudiya Vaishnavism. This brought him at odds with some pandits of the Mukti Maṇḍapa, who criticised him for lecturing on the Bhāgavata Purāṇa and other Vaishnava topics while lacking a proper Vaishnava initiation, or diksha, the tilak markings, and other devotional insignia. (Note: Kedarnath accepts this criticism as fair in his autobiography.) Even though Kedarnath was following Gaudiya Vaishnava spiritual discipline like harinama-japa, or chanting the Hare Krishna mantra on beads, (Note: with the only exception of his still non-vegetarian diet that he admits to following until his initiation in 1880) their opposition prompted Kedarnath to aspire to find a diksha-guru and take initiation from him.

While Kedarnath Datta was able to influence many bhadraloks towards the Gaudiya Vaishnavism taught by Chaitanya, he felt in need of assistance. When his wife gave birth to a new child, Kedarnath linked the event to a divinatory dream and named his son Bimala Prasad ('"the mercy of Bimala Devi").

In the 1880s, Kedarnath Datta, out of desire to foster the child's interest in spirituality, initiated him into harinama-japa. At the age of nine Bimala Prasad memorised the seven hundred verses of the Bhagavad Gita in Sanskrit. From his childhood Bimala Prasad demonstrated a sense of moral behavior, intelligence, and an eidetic memory. He gained a reputation for remembering passages from a book on a single reading, and learned enough to compose his own poetry in Sanskrit. Bhaktisiddhanta's biographers write that even up to his last days Bhaktisiddhanta Sarasvati could verbatim recall passages from books that he had read in his childhood, earning the epithet "living encyclopedia". Bimala Prasad later became known as Bhaktisiddhanta Sarasvati.

By the end Kedarnath's tenure in Puri his family had seven children, and his oldest daughter, Saudamani, 10, had to be married; it would be nearly impossible to find a Bengali Kayastha groom for her in Orissa.Thus, Kedarnath took a three-month privileged leave from his duties and in November 1874 went with his family to Bengal.

Extract of the work record of Kedarnath Datta. Corrected to 27 November 1893.
Taken from History of Services of Officers Holding Gazetted Appointments under the Government of Bengal (corrected to 1 July 1894) Chapter 9: Sub-executive officers, pp. 603–4
| Station | Substantive appointment | Date |
| Saran | Deputy Magistrate and Deputy Collector, 7th grade | 16 February 1866 |
| Kishanganj in Purneah | Deputy Magistrate and Deputy Collector, 7th grade | 2 November 1867 |
| Dinajpur | ditto | 7 May 1868 |
| Champaran | ditto | 15 November 1869 |
Leave without pay for 4 days from 10 April 1870
| Puri | ditto | 14 April 1870 |
| Puri | Deputy Magistrate and Deputy Collector, 6th grade | 25 November 1870 |
| Araria in Purneah | ditto | 12 April 1875 |
| Araria in Purneah | Deputy Magistrate and Deputy Collector, 5th grade | 9 December 1876 |
| Mohesrekhar in Howrah | ditto | 11 December 1877 |
| Bhadrak in Balasore | ditto | 26 February 1878 |
| Narail in Jessore | ditto | 14 October 1878; 17 Oct 1881 |
Leave of medical certificate for 4 months and 7 days from 10 January 1882
| Barasat in 24 Parganas | ditto | 17 May 1882 |
| Barasat in 24 Parganas | Deputy Magistrate and Deputy Collector, 4th grade | 20 May 1883 |
| Serampore in Hooghly | ditto | 17 April 1874 |
Privilege leave for 1 month from 7 October 1874; for 1 month and 7 days from 8 May 1885; and for 1 month and 24 days from 20 May 1886
| Nadia | ditto | 6 December 1887 |
| Nadia | Deputy Magistrate and Deputy Collector, 3rd grade | 29 January 1889 |
| Netrakona in Mymensingh | ditto | 20 February 1889 |
| Tangail | ditto | 27 May 1889 – 5 September 1889 |
| Kalra | ditto | 17 June 1890 |
| Burdwan | ditto | 29 October 1890 |
| Dinajpur | ditto | 26 November 1890 |
Furlough for 1 year, 7 months and 13 days from 20 August 1891
| On furlough | Deputy Magistrate and Deputy Collector, 2nd grade | 1 January 1892 |
| Sasaram in Bhahabad | ditto | 2 April 1893 |
| Nadia | ditto | 27 November 1893 |

== Later period (1874–1914): Writing and preaching ==
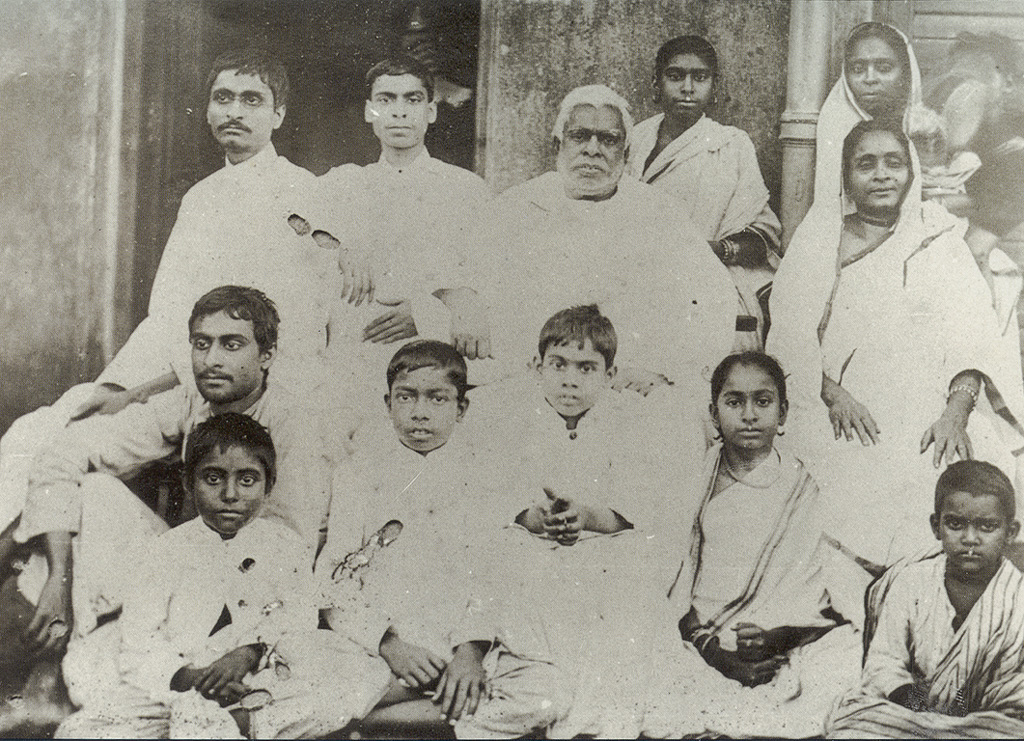
Kedarnath Datta's family ca.1900 From left to right: Back row: Bimala Prasad, Barada Prasad, Kedarnath Datta, Krishna Vinodini, Kadambini, and Bhagavati Devi (seated). Second row: Kamala Prasad, Shailaja Prasad, unknown grandchild, and Hari Pramodini. Front row: two unknown grandchildren.

After leaving Puri for Bengal, Kedarnath Datta decided to establish his family in Calcutta at a permanent home, which he called "Bhakti Bhavan." This afforded him more freedom for his traveling, studies and writing.

In 1880, Kedarnath and his wife accepted diksha (initiation) into Gaudiya Vaishnavism from Bipin Bihari Goswami (1848–1919), a jāti gosāñī and a descendant from one of Chaitanya's associates, Vamsivadana Thakur. This formalised Kedarnath's commitment to the Gaudiya Vaishnava sampradaya; Bipin Bihari Goswami's family were the founders of the Bāghnāpāḍā Vaiṣṇava sect whose theology centered on the idea of rasa-rāja to which Kedarnath was attracted. Later he developed a connection with the Gaudiya Vaishnava ascetic Jagannatha Dasa Babaji. The lineage of Bhaktivinoda's fourth son Bimala Prasad Dutta aka Bhaktisiddhanta Saraswati (which includes the Gaudiya Math and its successor institutions) claims Jagannath Das Babaji as Bhaktivinoda's śikṣā (and thus "real") guru. The lineage of Bhaktivinoda's seventh son Lalita Prasad Dutt and the lineage of Bhaktivinoda's disciple Sitanath Das aka Bhaktitirtha Thakur asserts Bipin Bihari Goswami remained Bhaktivinoda's real śikṣā guru his entire life.

In 1885, Kedarnath Datta formed the Vishva Vaishnava Raj Sabha ("Royal World Vaishnava Association") composed of leading Bengali Vaishnavas and established at his own house the Vaishnava Depository, a library and a printing press for systematically presenting Gaudiya Vaishnavism by publishing canonical devotional texts, often with his translations and commentaries, as well as his own original writing. In his endeavors to restore the purity and influence of Gaudiya Vaishnavism, in 1881 Bhaktivinoda began a monthly magazine in Bengali, Sajjana-toshani ("The source of pleasure for devotees"), in which he serialised many of his books and published essays of the history and philosophy of Gaudiya Vaishnavism, along with book reviews, poetry, and novels. In January 1886, in recognition of Kedarnath's significant Vaishanva literary and preaching achievements, the Bāghnāpāḍā Vaiṣṇava gosvāmīs, including his guru Bipin Bihari Goswami, conferred upon him the honorific title Bhaktivinoda; from that time on he was known as Kedarnath Datta Bhaktivinoda, or Bhakivinoda Thakur.

On 4 October 1894, at the age of 56, Bhaktivinoda Thakur retired from government service and moved with his family to Mayapur to focus on his devotional practice, writing and preaching. In 1908 Bhaktivinoda formally adopted the lifestyle and practice of a babaji (Vaishnava recluse) at his house in Calcutta, absorbed in chanting the Hare Krishna mantra until his death on 23 June 1914. His remains in a silver urn were interred at his house in Surabhi-kunj.

=== Major works ===
From 1874 till his departure in 1914 Bhaktivinoda wrote philosophical works in Sanskrit and English and devotional songs (bhajans) in simple Bengali. His bibliography includes over one hundred works, including translations of canonical Gaudiya Vaishnava texts, often with his own commentaries, as well as poems, devotional song books, and essays (Note: Bhaktivinoda would go to sleep at 19:30–20:00 but would rise at 22:00pm, light his oil lamp and write for six hours until 4:00 in the morning. He would then take a 30-minute nap, get up at 4:30 and chanted harinama-japa of the Hare Krishna mantra on beads. From 7:00 until 9:30 in the morning he would deal correspondence, study and receive visitors. From 10:00 until 17:00, with a break between 13:00–14:00 he would sit in court, hearing up to fifty cases a day and writing a detailed judgment for each. He would then get home, bathe, take a mean or rice, bread and milk, rest at 19:30–20:00 and resume his writing routine at 22:00.)

Krishna-samhita, published in 1879, was Bhaktivinoda's first major work. The book was intended as a response to criticism of Krishna by Christian missionaries, Brahmo Samaj, and Westernised bhadralok for what they saw as immoral behavior incompatible with his divine status in Hinduism. In defense of Vaishnavism, Bhaktivinoda's Krishna-samhita employed contemporary archeological, historical data, and theological thought. In particular, he applied what he termed adhunika-vada ("contemporary thinking") – his methodology of correlating the phenomenal discourse of the scripture with the observable reality.

In 1880, Bhaktivinoda sent copies of Krishna-samhita to intellectuals of Europe and America. He received responses from Sanskrit scholar in London, Reinhold Rost, and from Ralph Waldo Emerson. This has been described as introduction of Chaitanya's theology into the Western world.

In 1886 Bhaktivinoda published Chaitanya-siksamrita, summarising Chaitanya's teachings and his own socio-religious analysis. He also published his own Bengali translation of the Bhagavad Gita with commentaries by Visvanatha Chakravarti (ca.1626–1708). He also published Amnaya-sutra, Vaishnava-siddhanta-mala, and Prema-pradipa. He wrote Sanskrit commentaries on the Chaitanya-upanisad and Siksastakam, and wrote a commentary on the Chaitanya-caritamrita (Amrita-pravaha-bhashya - A commentary that showers nectar). Tattva-viveka, a concise work on higher intelligence in the individual, was published in 1893.

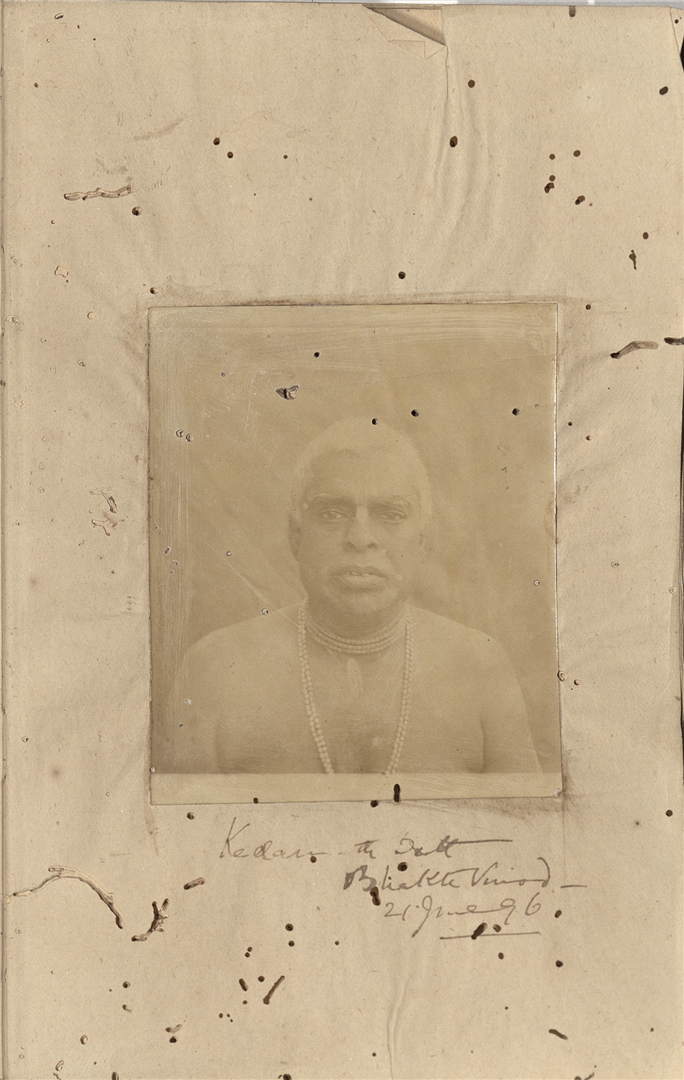
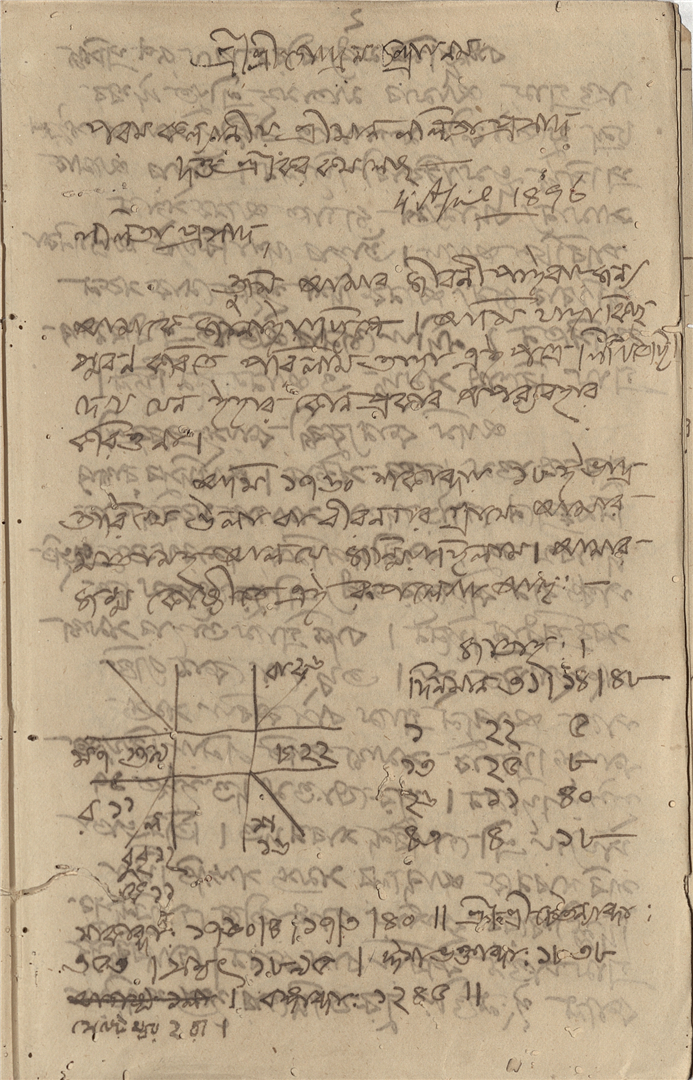
(left) Bhaktivinoda Thakur's photo with autograph and (right) the first page of his original Svalikhita-jivani. (1896)

In 1896, Bhaktivinoda wrote Jaiva-dharma, using a fictional style of a novel to present Vaishnava teachings through conversations that guide the characters' devotional transformations. Jaiva-dharma is considered one of the important books in the Gaudiya Vaishnava lineage of Bhaktivinoda. It has been translated into many languages.

At the request of his son Lalita Prasad, in 1896 Bhaktivinoda wrote a detailed autobiography called Svalikhita-jivani that covered 56 years of his life, from birth up until that time. The work described a life with financial struggle, health issues, internal doubts and insecurity, and introspection that gradually led him to the decision of accepting Chaitanya Mahaprabhu's teachings as his final goal. The book was published in 1916 after Bhaktivinoda's death. In the work Bhaktivinoda goes into frank details of his life and inner thoughts, which likely were considered embarrassing by Lalita Prasad who ensured the work had a very limited circulation. The Gaudiya Math in turn also likely intentionally ignored the Svalikhita-jivani due to its mention of Bhaktivinoda's meat-eating, his pre-dīkṣā Vaishnava publications, and early association with the Kartābhajā sect all of which would have weakened Bhaktisiddhanta's campaign against the caste goswamis.

Between 1881 and 1909, Kedarnath published the Bengali journal Sajjana-toshani ("The source of pleasure for devotees"), which he used to propagate Chaitanya's teachings among the bhadralok. In 1886, in recognition of his theological, philosophical and literary contributions, the Gaudiya Vaishnava community conferred upon him the honorific title of Bhaktivinoda.

In 1896 another publication of Bhaktivinoda's, a book in English entitled Srimad-Gaurangalila-Smaranamangala, or Chaitanya Mahaprabhu, His life and Precepts, was sent to several academics and libraries in Canada, Britain and Australia.

In February 2023, a new Bengali edition of the Svalikhita-Jivani, edited by Dr. Santanu Dey, was published jointly by the Bhaktivedanta Research Center and Dey's Publishing.

Yasomati-nandana (Sri Nama-kirtana)
A Bengali bhajan from Bhaktivinoda Thakur's Gitavali. (11:41)

Bhaktivinoda composed many devotional songs, or bhajans in Bengali and occasionally in Sanskrit, that were compiled into collections, such as Kalyana-kalpataru (1881), Saranagati (1893), and Gitavali (1893).

Bhaktivinoda combined the rationalism of 19th century bhadraloka society with older Hindu religiosity using a technique he called ādhunika-vāda ("modern approach"). In the Kr̥ṣṇa-Saṁhitā he considers history to be an evolutionary process, with Hindu and Vaishnava religion culminating in the avatara of Krishna and mādhurya-rasa being the peak form of worship.

Bhaktivinoda categorised spiritual seekers into three kinds: komala-śraddhas, madhyamādhikārīs, and uttamādhikārīs or sāragrāhīs. The komala-śraddhas are simple believers with faith in supernatural stories; madhyamādhikārīs are people driven by logic and rationalism, and he oriented his works toward them using the techniques of ādhunika-vāda, i.e. rational modern scholarship. The uttamādhikārīs or sāragrāhīs can appreciate other theological and philosophical views without losing faith in their own. Bhaktivinoda categorised most pre-modern Hindus as komala-śraddha-s, the bhadraloka as madhyamādhikarīs, and himself and Western scholars like Ralph Waldo Emerson and Reinhold Rost as uttamādhikārīs. Bhaktivinoda's ādhunika-vāda held that phenomenal knowledge (artha-prada) is subject to scrutiny, while transcendental knowledge (paramārtha-prada) is sacrosanct; he rejected traditional claims regarding the Bhāgavata Purāṇa's date of composition, authorship, and infallibility.

Bhaktivinoda developed a concept called sahaja-samādhi ("natural intuition"), derived from his experiences with Unitarianism and Transcendentalism. It refers to the pure soul's ability to directly perceive and infer divine knowledge beyond the limitations imposed by the mortal body. In the highest form of cognition (nitānta-sahaja-samādhi), a soul devoid of any doubt who rests on faith alone attains "the adoration of Śrī Kr̥ṣṇa in sweetness". Bhaktivinoda considered the direct personal experience of sahaja-samādhi as higher than Hindu religious scripture (śāstra). Due to influence from Unitarian thought, Bhaktivinoda considered the knowledge of scripture to be constrained by historical context, personal bias of its composer and listener, and the limitations of human language. In Bhaktivinoda's theory of religious symbolism, the description of Krishna lila is full of spiritual facsimiles and indicators of spiritual truth, while at the same time being a real historical (and eternal) event. Bhaktivinoda considered material objects in the world to be vikāras or imperfect modification of the perfect world of consciousness. According to Bhaktivinoda, there are three divine energies which combine with secondary energies in order to create the spiritual, soul, and material realities.

According to Bhaktivinoda, Krishna lila can be perceived by listeners on many levels depending on one's level of spiritual knowledge. People with the lowest level will perceive only the mundane, material aspects while those with greater ability can detect the inherent divine truths of eternal lila. Due to Christian missionary influence on the bhadraloka, there was a strong impulse against image worship; Bhaktivinoda in response asserted the importance of śrī-mūrti ("sacred image") by stating the mind cannot conceive of a formless deity, thus it is acceptable if not better to worship God in a material form using one's senses in order to elicit the greatest love for the divine. Bhaktivinoda affirmed the importance of reciting the names of Krishna, stating that the level of fruits of hearing and reciting those names depend on the spiritual capacity of the listener or speaker.

Bhaktivinoda, like the Unitarians, believed faith in God to be the natural state of humankind which then becomes obscured by the development of reason and civilisation. Bhaktivinoda stated the best way to cultivate devotion to God was to engage in "hearing, remembrance, and glorification" of divinity as stated in the Bhāgavata Purāṇa. Bhaktivinoda states devotional practices (sādhana bhakti) are best taken place in the context of vaijñānika-varṇadharmāśrama ("scientific varṇadharmāśrama"). Bhaktivinoda claimed Vedic society was organised along scientific principles where people belonged to certain varṇas and āśramas based on their individual merits and qualifications; according to Bhaktivinoda this vaijñānika-varṇadharmāśrama system then degraded into the present-day hereditary caste system in India promoted by the Smarta tradition. Bhaktivinoda follows post-Rūpa Gosvāmī theologians in the practice of rāgānugā-bhakti-sādhana; the devotional practice of spontaneity. In rāgānugā-bhakti-sādhana, a devotee assumes an internal identity or siddha deha ("pure body") of a figure in Krishna lila and approximates his or her devotional feelings based on that figure. The practice of rāgānugā-bhakti-sādhana almost always takes place in the form of mañjarī-sādhana, where a devotee assumes a named identity of a ten-to-sixteen year-old cowherd girl in Vraja who abandons her husband to serve and be protected by a specific chief cowherd girl in Krishna lila. Bhaktivinoda differs from traditional methods in allowing the devotee to empirically decide with the guru the appropriate siddha-deha. The devotee then practices aṣṭa-kāliya-līlā-smaraṇa, the recollection and self-participation in the activities of Krishna lila during the eight fixed periods of the day.

=== Claimed discovery of Chaitanya's birthplace ===
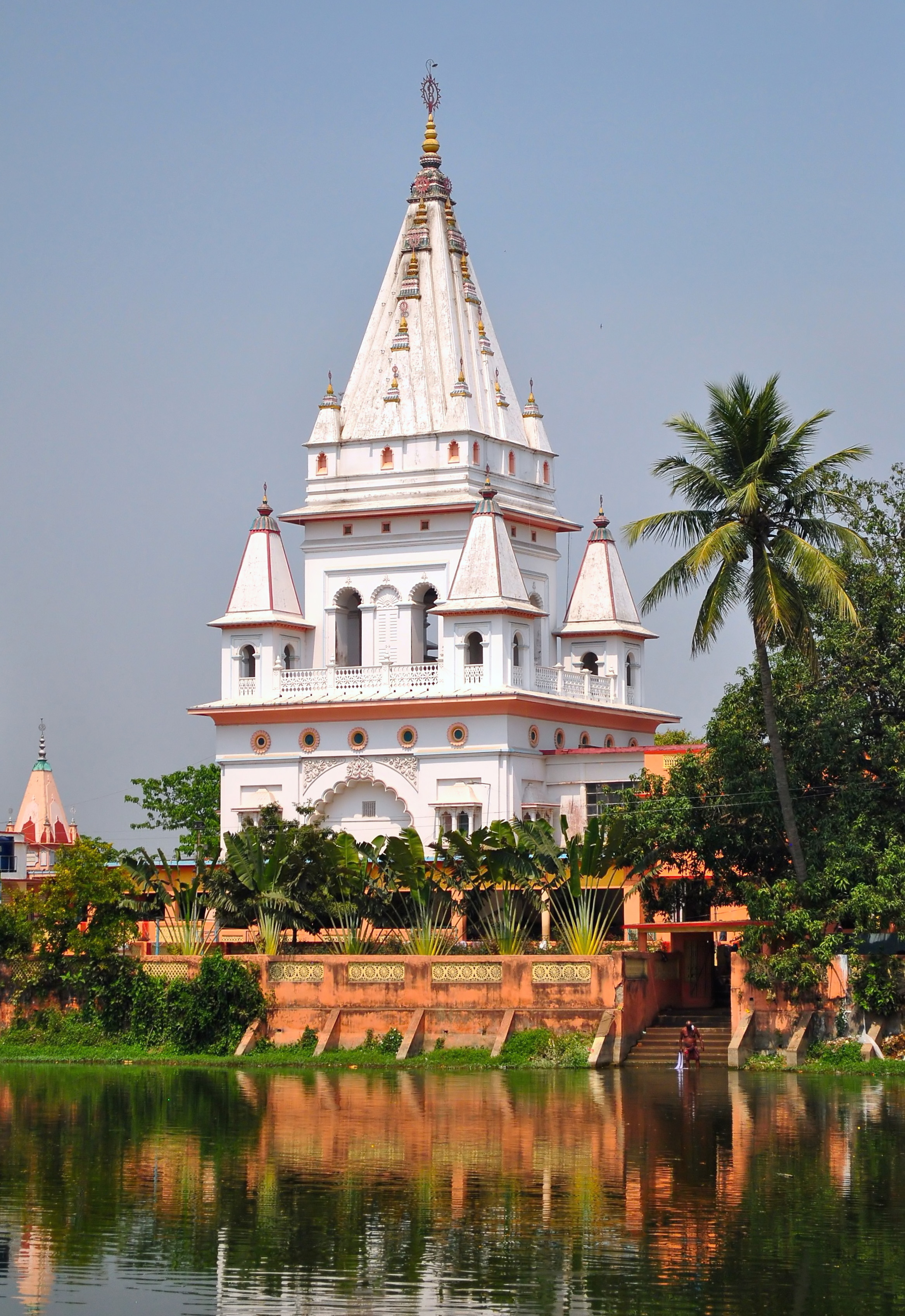
Yogapith, the temple at Chaitanya Mahaprabhu's birthsite in Mayapur established by Bhaktivinoda Thakur.

In 1886 Bhaktivinoda attempted to retire from his government service and move to Vrindavan to pursue his devotional life. However, he saw a dream in which Chaitanya ordered him to go to Nabadwip instead. After some difficulty, in 1887 Bhaktivinoda obtained a transfer to Krishnanagar, a district centre 25 kilometres (16 mi) away from Nabadwip, famous as the birthplace of Chaitanya Mahaprabhu. Despite poor health, Bhaktivinoda began to regularly visit Nabadwip to research places connected with Chaitanya. Soon he concluded that the site purported by the locals of Navadwip to be Chaitanya's birthplace could not possibly be genuine. Determined to find the actual place but frustrated by the lack of reliable evidence and clues, one night he saw a mystical vision:

By 10 o'clock the night was very dark and cloudy. Across the Ganges in a northern direction I suddenly saw a large building flooded with golden light. I asked Bimala if he could see the building and he said that he could. But my friend Kerani Babu could see nothing. I was amazed. What could it be? In the morning I went back to the roof and looked carefully back across the Ganges. I saw that in the place where I had seen the building was a stand of palm trees. Inquiring about this area I was told that it was the remains of Lakshman Sen's fort at Ballaldighi.

Taking this as a clue, Bhaktivinoda conducted an investigation of the site by consulting old maps and matching them against scriptural and verbal accounts. He concluded that the village of Ballaldighi was formerly known as Mayapur, confirmed in Bhakti-ratnakara to be the birth site of Chaitanya. Residents of Navadwip angrily rejected Bhaktivinoda's claims and argued that Navadwip was Chaitanya's true birthplace; it is still contested which is the true site. He soon acquired a property in Surabhi-kunj near Mayapur to oversee construction of a temple at Chaitanya's birthplace. For this purpose he organised, via Sajjana-tosani and special festivals, as well as personal acquaintances, a successful fundraising effort. Noted Bengali journalist Sisir Kumar Ghosh (1840–1911) commended Bhaktivinoda for the discovery and hailed him as "the seventh goswami" – a reference to the Six Goswamis, medieval Gaudiya Vaishnava ascetics closely associated with Chaitanya who had authored many of the school's theological texts and discovered places of Krishna's pastimes in Vrindavan.

=== Nama-hatta ===
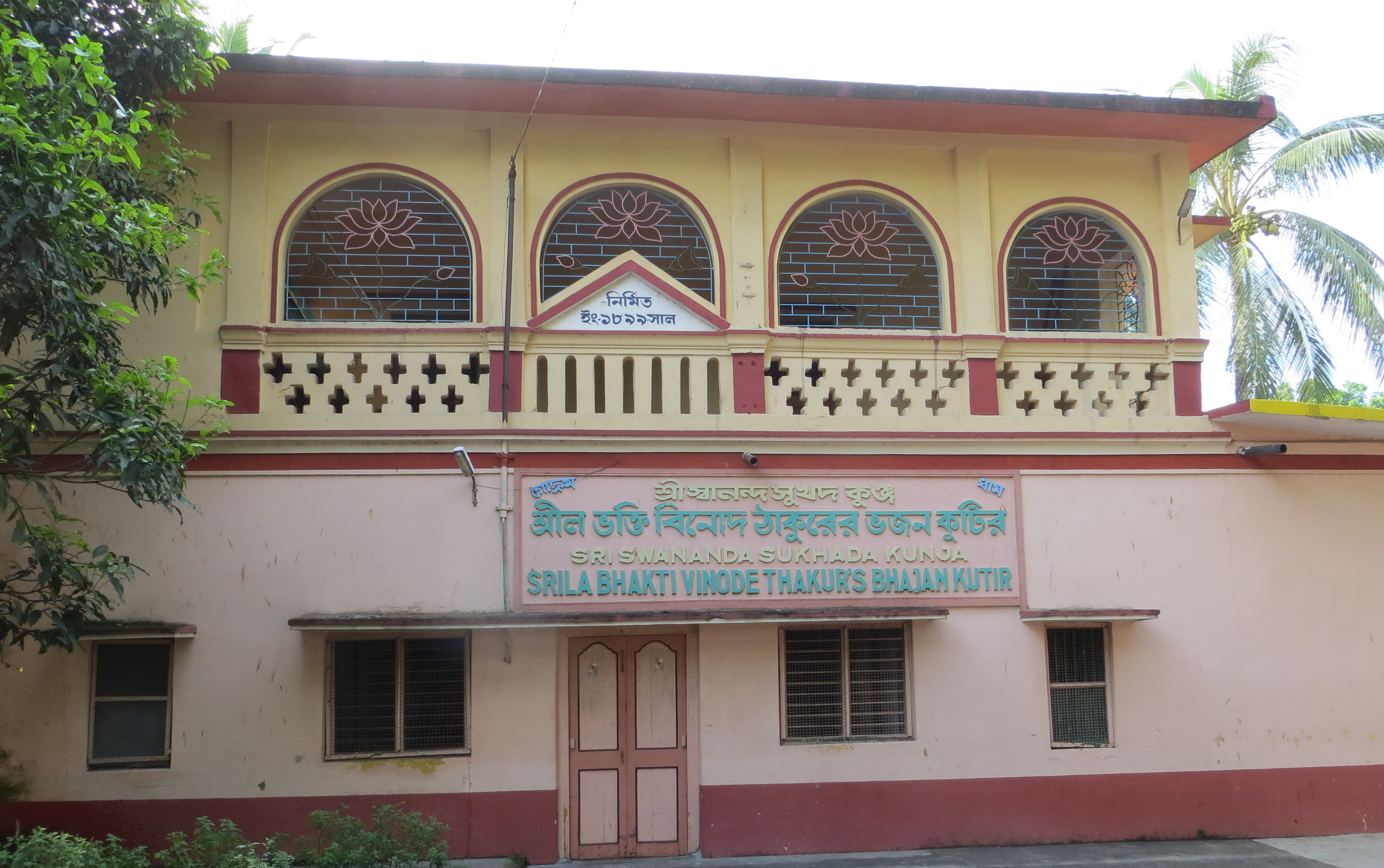
Bhaktivinoda Thakur's house at Surabhi-kunj (Mayapur) that served as the headquarters of his nama-hatta preaching.

Kedarnath started a travelling preaching program in Bengali and Orissan villages that he called nama-hatta, or "the market-place of the name [of Krishna]". Modelled after the circuit court system, his nama-hatta groups included kirtana parties, distribution of prasada (food offered to Krishna), and lecturers on the teachings of Gaudiya Vaishnavism, travelling from village to village as far as Vrindavan in an organised and systematic way. The program was a big success, widely popularising the teachings of Chaitanya among the masses as well as attracting a following of high-class patrons. By the beginning of the 20th century Bhaktivinoda had established over five hundred nama-hattas across Bengal.

=== Opposing Vaishnava heterodoxy ===
Prior to Bhaktivinoda's literary and preaching endeavours, an organised Gaudiya Vaishnava sampradaya (lineage) was nonexistent, as was a single, overarching Gaudiya Vaishnava canon in a codified form. In the absence of such theological and organisational commonality, claims of affiliation with Gaudiya Vaishnavism by individuals and groups were either tenuous, superficial, or unverifiable. Bhaktivinoda Thakur attempted to restore the Chaitanya movement from the motley assortment of sects that it came to be towards the end of the 19th century. He chose his Sajjjana-tosani magazine as the means for this task. Through his articles dealing with the process of initiation and sadhana, through translations of Vaishnava scriptures, and through his commentaries on contemporary issues from a Vaishnava perspective, Bhaktivinoda was gradually establishing, both in the minds of his large audience and in writing, (Note: Many Bhaktivinoda's books appeared first serialized in Sajjana-tosani before being printed in single volumes.) the foundation for Gaudiya Vaishnava orthodoxy and orthopraxy, or what a Vaishnava is and isn't.

Gradually Bhaktivinoda directed criticism at various heterodox Vaishnava groups abounding in Bengal that he identified and termed "a-Vaishnava" (non-Vaishnava) and apasampradayas ("deviant lineages"): Aul, Baul, Saina, Darvesa, Sahajiya, smarta brahmanas, etc. Of them, the Vaishnava spin-off groups that presented sexual promiscuity to be a spiritual practice became the target of choice for Bhaktivinoda's especially pointed attacks. Despite the erotic aspects of rāgānugā-bhakti, Bhaktivinoda vehemently argued against the mundane sexual interpretation of the relationship between Krishna and the gopis as promoted by Vaishnava Sahajiya, which he claimed was totally non-Vaishnava and tarnishing the reputation of Chaitanya Vaishnavism.

A more tacit but nothing short of uncompromising philosophical assault was directed at the influential jati-gosais (caste goswamis) or mantrācāryas (initiating gurus) and smarta brahmanas who claimed exclusive right to conduct initiations into Gaudiya Vaishnavism on the basis of their hereditary affiliation with Chaitanya's original followers and denied eligibility to do so to non-brahmana Vaishnavas. Bhaktivinoda claimed that they were negligent gurus who failed to maintain the conduct of their disciples and the disciples themselves failed to assess the worthiness of their guru. Bhaktivinoda believed that varṇa should not be based on birth but instead be determined in childhood by a village committee by looking at the child's temperament and qualifications and then reviewing the varṇa decision after a two-year trial period. While Bhaktivinoda complained against the current caste system in his writing, he never took action against it during his lifetime, likely due to his preferred focus on mañjarī-sādhana and his social status as a government magistrate and family-man. In 1911, Bhaktivinoda asked his son Bhaktisiddhanta to represent him at the Brāhmaṇa o Vaiṣṇava (Brahmana and Vaishnava) debate in Balighai, Midnapore, where Bhaktisiddhanta argued that, according to Vaishnava texts, spiritual qualification is based on initiation and practice rather than caste birth.

== Reaching out to the West ==
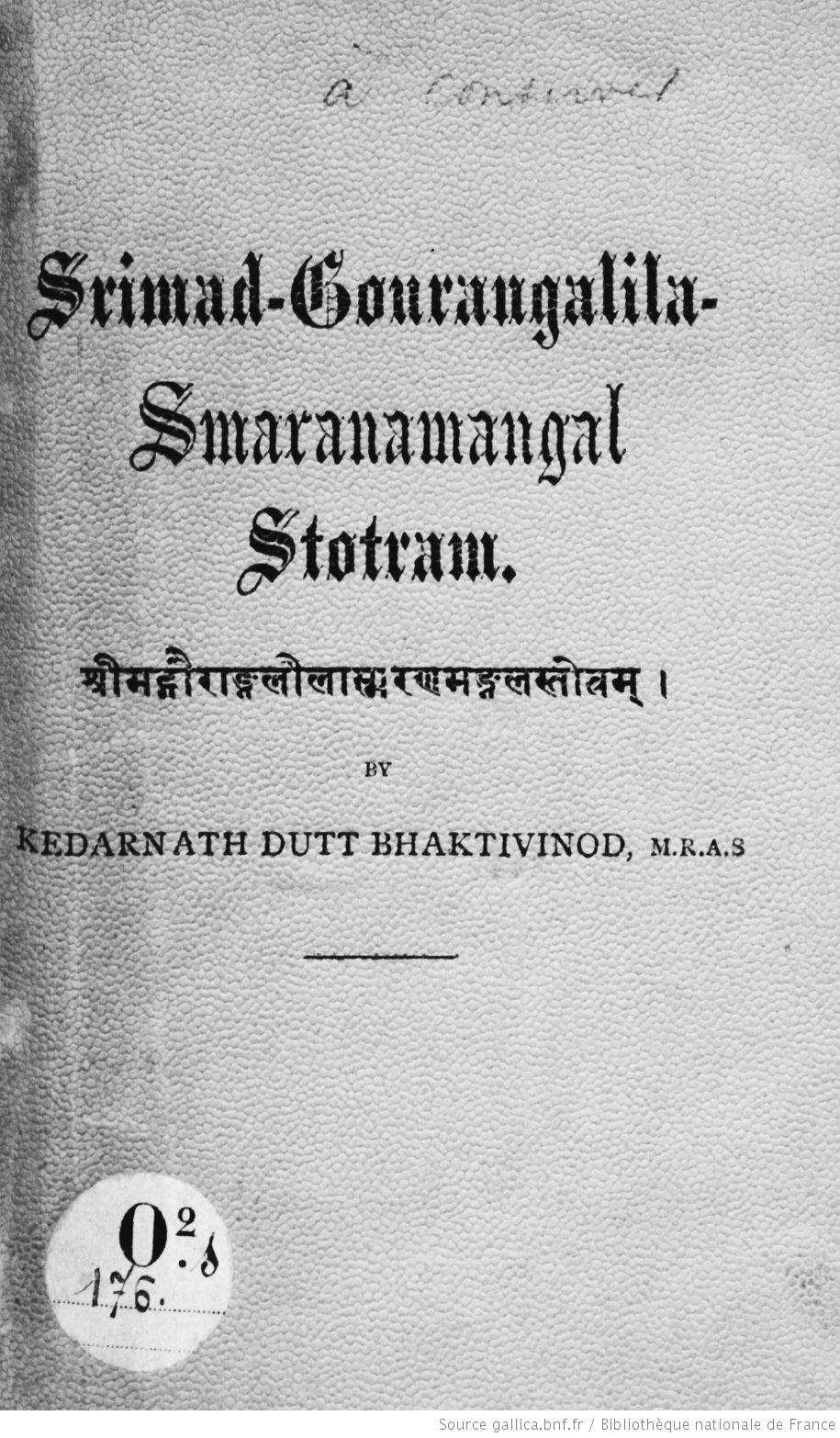
Sri Chaitanya Mahaprabhu: His Life and Precepts, the book Bhaktivinoda Thakur sent to the West in 1896.

Although his Krishna-samhita made it into the hands of some leading intellectuals of the West, a book in Sanskrit had very few readers there. Despite this obstacle, in 1882 Bhaktivinoda stated in his Sajjana-toshani magazine a coveted vision of universalism and brotherhood across borders and races:

When in England, France, Russia, Prussia, and America all fortunate persons by taking up kholas [drums] and karatalas [cymbals] will take the name of Chaitanya Mahaprabhu again and again in their own countries, and raise the waves of sankirtana [congregational singing of Krishna's names], when will that day come! Oh! When will the day come when the white-skinned British people will speak the glory of Shachinandana [another name of Chaitanya] on one side and on the other and with this call spread their arms to embrace devotees from other countries in brotherhood, when will that day come! The day when they will say "Oh, Aryan Brothers! We have taken refuge at the feet of Chaitanya Deva in an ocean of love, now kindly embrace us," when will that day come!

Bhaktivinoda did not stop short of making practical efforts to implement his vision. In 1896 he published and sent to several academic addressees in the West a book entitled Gaurangalila-Smaranamangala, or Chaitanya Mahaprabhu, His life and Precepts, (Note: The book was also published under slightly varied titles, such as Chaitanya, His Life and Precepts.) which portrayed Chaitanya Mahaprabhu as a champion of "universal brotherhood and intellectual freedom":

Caitanya preaches equality of men ...universal fraternity amongst men and special brotherhood amongst Vaishnavas, who are according to him, the best pioneers of spiritual improvement. He preaches that human thought should never be allowed to be shackled with sectarian views....The religion preached by Mahaprabhu is universal and not exclusive. The most learned and the most ignorant are both entitled to embrace it. . . . The principle of kirtana invites, as the future church of the world, all classes of men without distinction of caste or clan to the highest cultivation of the spirit.

Bhaktivinoda adapted his message to the Western mind by borrowing popular Christian expressions such as "universal fraternity", "cultivation of the spirit", "preach", and "church" and deliberately using them in a Hindu context. Copies of Chaitanya, His Life and Precepts were sent to Western scholars across the British Empire, and landed, among others, in academic libraries at McGill University in Montreal, at the University of Sydney in Australia and at the Royal Asiatic Society of London. The book also made its way to prominent scholars such as Oxford Sanskritist Monier Monier-Williams and earned a favorable review in the Journal of the Royal Asiatic Society.

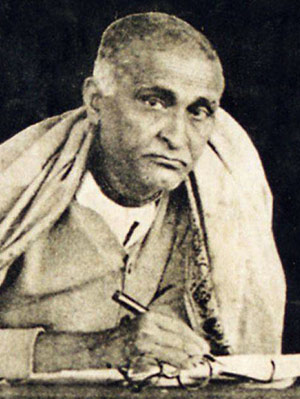
Bhaktisiddhanta Sarasvati editing an article. ca.1930s

Bhaktivinoda's son, who by that time came to be known as Bhaktisiddhanta Sarasvati, inherited the vision of spreading the message of Chaitanya Mahaprabhu in the West from his father. This inspiration was bequeathed to Bhaktisiddhanta in a letter that he received from Bhaktivinoda in 1910:

Sarasvati! ...Because pure devotional conclusions are not being preached, all kinds of superstitions and bad concepts are being called devotion by such pseudo-sampradayas as sahajiya and atibari. Please always crush these anti-devotional concepts by preaching pure devotional conclusions and by setting an example through your personal conduct. ...Please try very hard to make sure that the service to Mayapur will become a permanent thing and will become brighter and brighter every day. The real service to Mayapur can be done by acquiring printing presses, distributing devotional books, and sankirtan – preaching. Please do not neglect to serve Mayapur or to preach for the sake of your own reclusive bhajan. ...I had a special desire to preach the significance of such books as Srimad Bhagavatam, Sat Sandarbha, and Vedanta Darshan. You have to accept that responsibility. Mayapur will prosper if you establish an educational institution there. Never make any effort to collect knowledge or money for your own enjoyment. Only to serve the Lord will you collect these things. Never engage in bad association, either for money or for some self-interest. (Note: The original letter was never recovered; however, Bhaktisiddhanta quoted these instructions by Bhaktivinoda, apparently considering them as seminal for his mission, in a 1926 letter.)

In the 1930s, the Gaudiya Math founded by Bhaktisiddhanta sent its missionaries to Europe, but remained largely unsuccessful in its Western outreach efforts, until in 1966 Bhaktisiddhanta's disciple A.C. Bhaktivedanta Swami (1896–1977) founded in New York City the International Society for Krishna Consciousness (ISKCON). Modeled after the original Gaudiya Math and emulating its emphasis on dynamic mission and spiritual practice, ISKCON popularised Chaitanya Vaishnavism on a global scale, becoming the world's leading proponent of Hindu bhakti personalism.

== Legacy ==
In 2023 the Bhaktivedanta Research Center established an endowment to the Department of Sociology, Presidency University, Kolkata, in honour of Bhaktivinod Thakur, who was a student of Hindu College in 1853. The scholarship aims to support academic endeavors related to the study of religion within the department.

An archive has been compiled containing records of Hindu/Presidency College (Now Presidency University, Kolkata), developed through collaboration with the British Library and the University of Chicago. Among the documents found in this archive is an attendance register from Hindu College bearing the name of Kedarnath Dutta.
