= Bhaktivedanta Research Center =

Research center headquartered in Kolkata, India

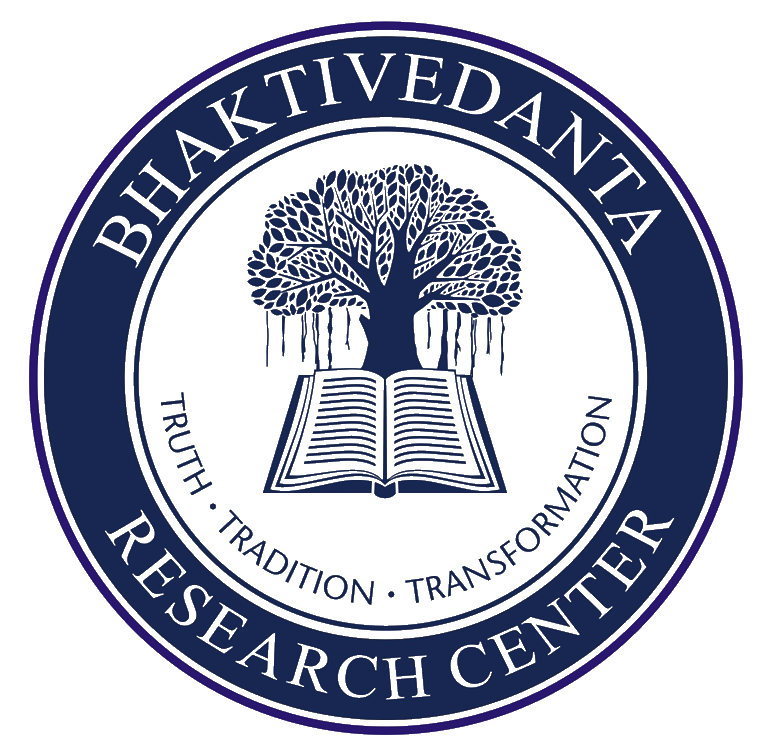
- Founded: 2009; 17 years ago
- Founder: Dr. Ferdinando Sardella; Dennis Harrison
- Type: Non-profit organization
- Purpose: Academic and research institute; Library and Exhibits; Workshops, events, & Conferences; Collecting and preserving rare collection of books, shastras, journals, and manuscripts
- Key people: Gauranga Das (Director Administration), Dr. Sumanta Rudra (Dean Academic Affairs)
- Website: brcglobal.org

Bhaktivedanta Research Center, established in 2009 and headquartered in Kolkata, India, is a research center dedicated to the preservation, study, and dissemination of Indian philosophical traditions, with a particular emphasis on Gaudiya Vaishnavism. Founded by Ferdinando Sardella and Dennis Harrison.

== History ==
Bhaktivedanta Research Center, established in December 2009 by Ferdinando Sarardella, a PhD student from the University of Gothenburg to continued its mission to preserve and digitize rare manuscripts and books related to Indian philosophy and the Gaudiya Vaishnava movement.The Center houses a collection of 17,000 books, 4,000 journals, and 70 manuscripts, related to Indian culture and philosophy.

In January 2025, BRC's Ph.D. and postgraduate programs, recognized by the University of Mumbai and Specialised Studies Center Savitribai Phule Pune University.

== Activities ==
In March 2023, the Bhaktivedanta Research Center launched an initiative to digitize and preserve 17th-century manuscripts related to the Saraswat practices of Bengali scholars, making them accessible to researchers. The center's efforts focused on preserving valuable texts of Indian philosophy for academic study.

In July 2023, the Bhaktivedanta Research Center supported the Scottish Church College's Darshan Eshana project, aimed at digitizing over 1,000 rare philosophical books linked to figures including Swami Vivekananda, Srila Prabhupada, and Netaji Subhas Chandra Bose. The Center provided both financial and technical assistance, with the first phase of digitization completed in eight months.

In September 2023, the Bhaktivedanta Research Center launched the Bhakti Vinod Tagore Memorial Scholarship at Presidency University. The initiative aimed to introduce the contributions of Bhakti Vinod Tagore to the new generation, with the hope of honoring his legacy.

In June 2025, the Bhaktivedanta Research Center completed the digitization of the manuscript collection of Sri Padmanabha Goswami of the Radha Raman Temple. The collection includes writings of his great-grandfather, Pandit Sarvabhooma Madhusudana Goswami. His father, Acharya Sri Visvambhar Goswami, served as Mayor of Vrindavan in the 1950s.

In 2025, BRC produced its first documentary film, Kirtan: The Heritage of Bengal. The film was directed by Debolina Ghosh and produced in collaboration with Debu's Darbaar. It was filmed in Mayapur and examines the kirtan tradition within the Gaudiya Vaishnava community. The documentary premiered on 9 November 2025 in Paris at the Festival Terres du Bengale, with a screening at La Camillienne.

== Collaboration ==
In December 2022, the Bhaktivedanta Research Center collaborated with the University of Hyderabad, Stockholm University, and Sri Padmavati Mahila Visvavidyalayam to organize an international seminar on indigenous healthcare, spiritual practices, and health psychology. The three-day seminar, attended by over 70 academicians, researchers, and students, focused on the therapeutic impact of rituals, bio-psycho-social approaches to health, and Indian contributions to the field of health psychology.

In February 2023, the Bhaktivedanta Research Center, in collaboration with Dej Publishers, reprinted the autobiography of Bhaktivinoda Thakur, originally written in 1896 and first published by his son, Lalita Prasad Dutta, in 1916. The revised edition was officially released in Mayapur by ISKCON's Jayapataka Swami, Guruprasad Swami, Gauranga Das, and others.

In July 2024, the Bhaktivedanta Research Center collaborated with the Howrah Cultural Literary Society to digitize and preserve approximately 6,000 ancient manuscripts, most of which date back to the fifteenth century. These manuscripts, previously stored under the supervision of the Government of India, include writings on a variety of subjects such as the Ramayana, Mahabharata, Puranas, philosophy, and grammar.

In November 2024,the Bhaktivedanta Research Center collaborated with Scottish Church College to inaugurate the Abhay Charan De Seminar Hall, named in honor of A.C. Bhaktivedanta Prabhupada, at the college where he studied from 1916. The seminar hall serves as a tribute to his academic journey, where he studied.

In January 2025, the Bhaktivedanta Research Center signed an MoU with the BharatGen Initiative at IIT Bombay's Technology Incubation Hub to integrate AI into heritage research. The collaboration aims to modernize traditional knowledge, develop advanced research tools, and preserve India's cultural heritage.

In March 2025, the Bhaktivedanta Research Center signed an MoU with IIT Mandi to advance the preservation and study of ancient Indian manuscripts. The collaboration integrates modern technology into Indian philosophy research, with IIT Mandi providing infrastructure, training, and support for Sanskrit analysis, manuscript digitization, and AI-based research.

In February 2025, the Bhaktivedanta Research Center, in collaboration with the Asiatic Society, Kolkata, hosted an exhibition and lecture series to commemorate the 539th birth anniversary of Chaitanya Mahaprabhu. Held at the Asiatic Society's Heritage Building, the event highlighted his life, teachings, and lasting impact, deepening public understanding of his philosophy and legacy.

In March 2026, BRC and the Indian Institute of Technology Bhubaneswar signed a Memorandum of Understanding aimed at supporting collaborative research related to India's intellectual heritage.

In July 2025, BRC in collaboration with Haribol Kuthir, launched a digital platform providing online access to the Gaudiya Vaishnava Abhidhan, compiled by Sri Haridasa Dasa Babaji.

In September 2025, BRC in collaboration with Bookpecker's Publishing House and Literary Agency in Kolkata, launched the English edition of Chaitanyadeva, originally authored in Bengali by Nrisinha P. Bhaduri and translated into English by Upamanyu Majumder.

In November 2025, BRC introduced Eso Bangla Shikhi, an online Bengali language course developed in collaboration with Scottish Church College.

In December 2025, BRC in collaboration with the Bagbazar Gaudiya Mission, launched a digital library at the Mission to provide online access to its collection for readers, devotees, students, teachers, and researchers worldwide.

In 2026, the BRC collaborated with the University of Calcutta to establish the Bhaktivedanta International Centre of Excellence for Chaitanya Vaishnava Studies. The centre was established to facilitate academic study and research on the life, philosophy and Vaishnava tradition associated with Chaitanya Mahaprabhu. The University of Calcutta's Department of Sanskrit, the centre would offer certificate and diploma courses in addition to opportunities for research.

== Awards and recognition ==
In March 2024, the Bhaktivedanta Research Center in Kolkata was awarded the Indian Chamber of Commerce Social Impact Award for its contributions to preserving ancient manuscripts and promoting Indian literature, philosophy, and culture. The award was presented by Governor C. V. Ananda Bose to Balram Leela Prabhu.
