= Kashiprasad Ghosh =

Bengali poet and journal editor (1809–1874)

- কালিপ্রসাদ ঘোষ
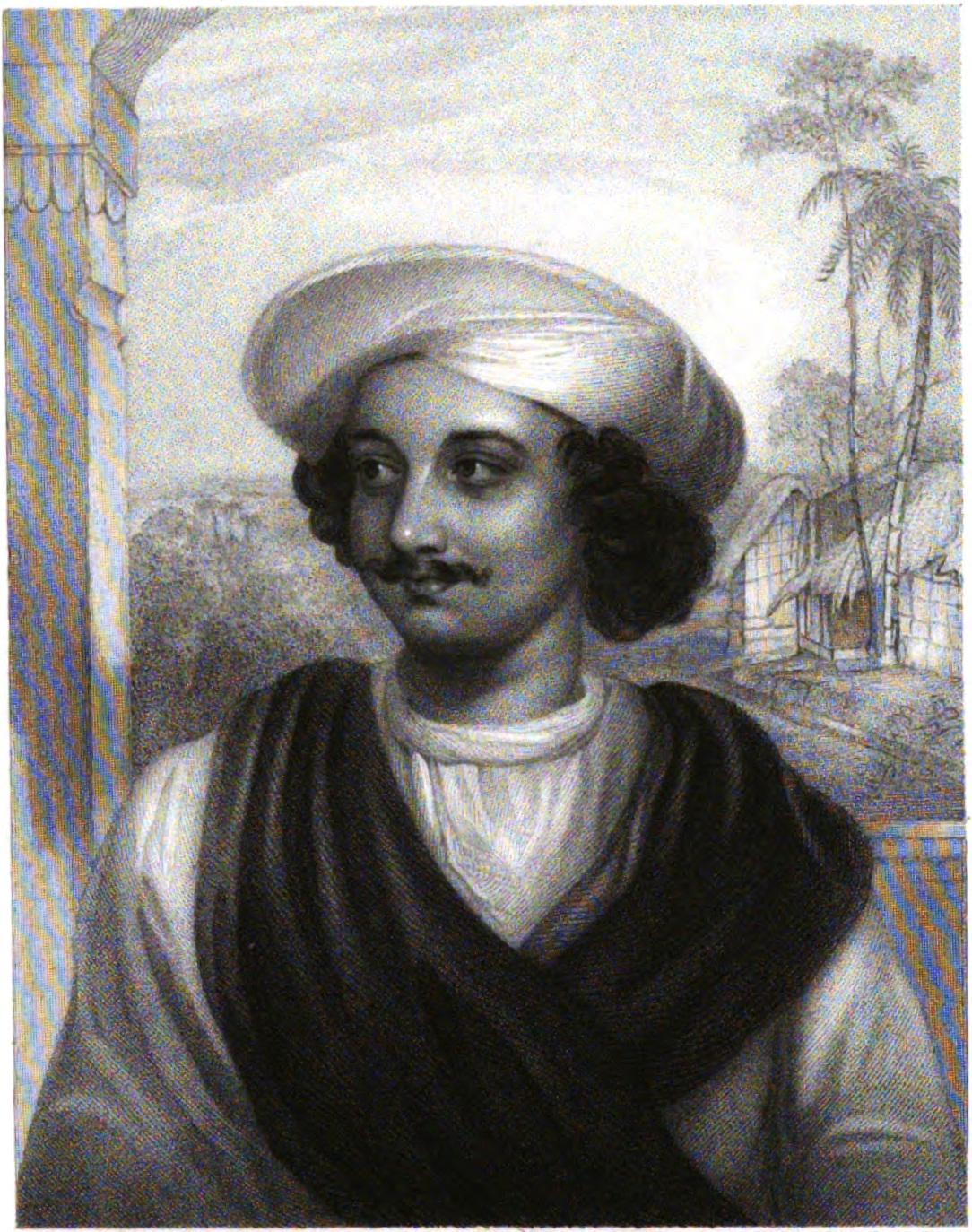
- Born: 1809; Hedua, Calcutta, British India
- Died: 1874 (aged 64–65)
- Education: Hindu College, Kolkata
- Occupation: Poet
- Writing career
- Genre: Indian English Literature

Kashiprasad Ghosh was a Bengali poet and the editor of the Hindu Intelligencer, an English-language journal that was published in Calcutta and voiced the opinion of the bhadralok community. Ghosh's wife was a maternal aunt of Bhaktivinoda Thakur (1838-1914), a leading spiritual reformer and philosopher of Gaudiya Vaisnavism.

Letitia Landon included a memorandum on this poet in Fisher's Drawing Room Scrap Book, 1835 together with an example of his work: The Boatmen's Song to Ganga. The memorandum is as follows:

THIS young Indian poet is a remarkable instance of the mind’s inherent bent developing itself under the most adverse circumstances. It is curious in all its history to observe, that poetry is a flower which is born and flourishes on what would seem its most ungenial soil. Certainly our English verse is the last accomplishment we should have expected in the youthful Hindoo.

Kasiprasad Ghosh is of high Braminical extraction, and of independent fortune. At the age of fourteen he was sent to the Anglo-Indian College, where he made rapid progress. He soon shewed a marked predilection for our literature; indeed, he himself says, “I have composed many songs in Bengalee, but the greater portion of my writing is in English, — and, indeed, have always found it easiest to express my sentiments in that language.” An essay that he wrote at a very early period, on Mr. Mills’ History of India, attracted much attention; and, since then, he has published a volume of poems called “The Shair,” the Indian word for Minstrel.

Our English readers must bear in mind the prejudices which a Bramin had to surmount, in order to appreciate the acquirements of this highly gifted stranger. At Calcutta, Kasiprasad Ghosh is universally beloved and admired : and we cannot but think that a vast field lies before him. His native literature is full of subjects for poetry of the highest order; subjects, however, requiring much fine taste and much judgment, which could only be acquired by a knowledge of European literature. Now our Indian poet has the material, the talent, and the cultivation; what, therefore, may not be expected from him ?

M. K. Naik remarks about Kashiprasad Ghosh's craftsmanship of Poetry by saying "Kashiprosad Ghose seems to intimate by turns the stylized love-lyrics of the Cavalier poets, the moralizing note in Neoclassical poetry and the British Romantics and his "Shair" being obviously Scott's minstrel' in an Indian garb, slightly dishevelled as a result of the arduous voyage across the seas. His use of Indian material in his poems about the Hindu festivals and in lyrics like "The Boatman's Song to Ganga" indicates an honest attempt to strike a native wood which fails not because earnestness of purpose is writing but owing to the sheer lack of true poetic talent"
