= Bhaktivinoda Thakur bibliography =

This is a list of works by Bhaktivinoda Thakur (1838–1914), a Gaudiya Vaishnava theologian and reformer. This list includes his original works, commentaries on canonical Vaishnava texts, and articles in periodical Sajjana-toshani.

1. Hari-katha: Topics of Lord Hari, 1850
2. Sumbha-Nisumbha-yuddha, 1851
3. Poriade, 1857–58
4. Mathas of Orissa, 1860
5. Vijana-grama, 1863
6. Sannyasi, 1863
7. Our Wants, 1863
8. Valide Rejishtri, 1866
9. Speech on Gautama, 1866
10. The Bhagavat: Its Philosophy, Its Ethics, and Its Theology, 1869
11. Garbha-stotra-vyakhya, 1870
12. Reflections, 1871
13. Thakura Haridasa, 1871
14. The Temple of Jagannatha at Puri, 1871
15. The Monasteries of Puri, 1871
16. The Personality of Godhead, 1871
17. A Beacon of Light, 1871
18. Saragrahi Vaishnava, 1871
19. To Love God, 1871
20. The Atibadis of Orissa, 1871
21. The Marriage System of Bengal, 1871
22. Vedantadhikarana-mala, 1872
23. Datta-kaustubham, 1874
24. Dutta Vansa Mala, 1875 & 1899
25. Bauddha-vijaya-kavyam, 1878
26. Sri Krishna-samhita, 1879
27. Sri Sajjana-toshani, (monthly magazine) 1881
28. Kalyana-kalpataru, 1881
29. Review of Nitya-rupa-samsthapanam, 1883
30. Visva-Vaishnava-Kalpatari, 1885
31. Dasopanishad-curnika, 1886
32. Bhavavali (commentary), 1886
33. Rasika-ranjana, (commentary on Bhagavad Gita) 1886
34. Sri Caitanya-sikshamrita, 1886
35. Prema-pradipa, 1886
36. Published Sri Vishnu-sahasra-nama, 1886
37. Bhajana-darpana-tika(translation and commentary of Manah siksa), 1886
38. Sri Caitanya-Upanishad (commentary), 1887
39. Sri Krishna-vijaya (published), 1887
40. Vaishnava-siddhanta-mala, 1888
41. Sri Amnaya-sutram, 1890
42. Siddhanta-darpanam (Bengali translation), 1890
43. Sri Navadvipa-dhama-mahatmya, 1890
44. Sri Godruma-kalpatari (essays on nama-hatta), 1891
45. Vidvad-ranjana (commentary on Bhagavad Gita), 1891
46. Sri Harinama, 1892
47. Sri Nama, 1892
48. Sri Nama-tattva-siksastaka, 1892
49. Sri Nama-mahima, 1892
50. Sri Nama-pracara, 1892
51. Sriman Mahaprabhura Siksa, 1892
52. Tattva-vivekah or Sri Saccidanandanubhutih, 1893
53. Saranagati, 1893
54. Gitavali, 1893
55. Gitamala, 1893
56. Soka-satana, 1893
57. Nama-bhajana, 1893
58. Bhaktyaloka
59. Tattva-sutram, 1894
60. Vedarka-didhiti (commentary on Sri Isopanishad), 1894
61. Tattva-muktavali or Mayavada-satadushani, (translated and published), 1894
62. Amrita-pravaha-bhashya (commentary on Caitanya caritamrita), 1895
63. Svalikhita-Jivani, (In February 2023, A new Bengali edition of the Svalikhita-Jivani has been published by the BRC and Dey's Publishing and edited by Dr. Santanu Dey.)
64. Sri Gauranga-lila-smarana-mangala-stotram, 1896
65. Sri Ramanuja-upadesa, 1896
66. Jaiva-Dharma, 1896
67. Sri Caitanya Mahaprabhu, His Life and Precepts, 1896
68. Prakshini (commentary on Brahma-samhita), 1897
69. Sri Goloka-mahatmya (Bengali translation of Brihad Bhagavatamrita), 1898
70. Sri Krishna-karnamritam (translation), 1898
71. Piyusha-varshini-vritti (commentary on Upadesamrita), 1898
72. Asvada-vistarini-bhasa (translation and commentary on Krishna bhajanamrta), 1899
73. Sri Navadvipa-bhava-taranga, 1899
74. The Hindu Idols, 1899
75. Sri Harinama-cintamani, 1900
76. Sri Bhagavata Arka-marici-mala, 1901
77. Sri Sankalpa-kalpadruma (Bengali translation), 1901
78. Sri Bhajana-rahasya, 1902
79. Sri Prema-vivarta (published), 1906
80. Svaniyama-dvadasakam, 1907
