= Gauranga Das =

Indian Hindu monk (born 1971)

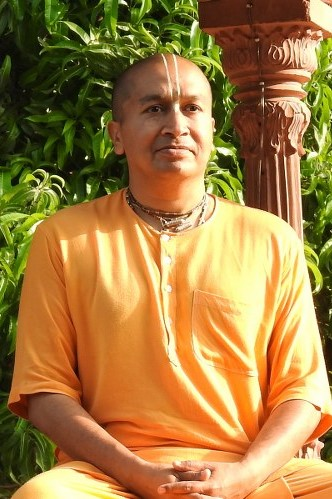
- Gauranga Das in 2020

Personal life
- Born: A.S.K. Anand; July 8, 1971 (age 55) Mumbai, India
- Notable work(s): The Art of Resilience: 40 stories to uplift the mind and transform the heart, The Art of Focus: Through 40 Yoga Stories, The Art of Habits: 40 Stories to Uplift the Mind and Transform the Heart
- Education: IIT Bombay
- Other name: Gauranga Prabhu

Religious life
- Religion: Hinduism
- Temple: ISKCON
- Lineage: Brahma-Madhva-Gaudiya Sampradaya
- Sect: Vaishnavism (Gaudiya Vaishnavism)
- Initiation: Diksha

Religious career
- Post: Senior Brahmachari

Gauranga Das (IAST: Gaurāṅga dāsa), also known as Gauranga Prabhu, is an Indian Hindu monk, spiritual leader, and author. He serves as a governing body commissioner of International Society for Krishna Consciousness (ISKCON), the director of ISKCON Govardhan Ecovillage, a United Nations World Tourism Organization (UNWTO) ecovillage community accredited by multiple UN bodies. He also serves as UNEP's Faith for Earth Counsellor. Additionally, he is the administrative director of the Bhaktivedanta Research Centre (BRC) and a founding board member of Rishihood University.

== Early life and education ==
Gauranga Das was born as A.S.K. Anand on July 8, 1971 in Mumbai, to a South Indian family. Das completed his early education at English Medium Middle School, Sector 9, Bhilai, where he attended kindergarten through Class 8. He continued his secondary education at Delhi Public School (DPS) Bhilai, completing Classes 9 through 12. He then pursued a Bachelor of Technology (BTech) degree at the Indian Institute of Technology (IIT) Bombay, graduating in 1993.

== Career ==
In 1993 Gauranga Das started his career at Kirloskar Oil Engines Ltd in Pune from August to November.

Gauranga Das is the Director of Govardhan Ecovillage, a United Nations World Tourism Organization (UNWTO) ecovillage community accredited by multiple UN bodies, including UNEP, UNCCD, UN ECOSOC, and UN CBD. He also serves as UNEP's Faith for Earth Counsellor. He is a member of ISKCON's Governing Body Commission (GBC), with global responsibilities for Human Resource Development and Capacity Building of ISKCON temples worldwide. He works on creating systems to foster a culture of care within ISKCON communities, enhancing the competence of ISKCON leadership through comprehensive training and development programs.

Gauranga Das holds several positions within ISKCON: Global Duty Officer for the ISKCON Governing Body Commission (GBC), Trustee of ISKCON GBC College, Active member of the GBC Organizational Development Committee, and Active member of the GBC Nominations Committee.

He is the co-facilitator for the Food Systems, Hunger, and Poverty Working Group in the C20 Brazil on behalf of India. During the C20 India 2023 events, he served as the Co-Ordinator of the Food and LiFE Sub Working Group and led the initiative to declare 2023–2033 as the decade of conscious food production and consumption.

He is co-president of the ISKCON Chowpatty temple and as the administrative director of the Bhaktivedanta Research Centre (BRC) in Kolkata. He is involved in the development of the Ekatma Dham Project in Madhya Pradesh and is a founding board member of Rishihood University. He is a member of the High-Profile Advisory Committee of the Central Sanskrit University and a visiting faculty member at IIM Nagpur.

In 2025 Gauranga Das launched a think tank, India House, co-founded by alumni and faculty of various IITs, and he acts as a mentor to the organization.

== Published works ==
- Das Prabhu, G. (2021). The Art of Resilience: 40 stories to uplift the mind and transform the heart. Penguin Random House India Private Limited. ISBN 978-93-90914-99-9.
- Das, G. (2022). The Art of Focus: Through 40 Yoga Stories. Penguin Random House India Private Limited. ISBN 978-93-5492-512-2.
- Das, G. (2023). The Art of Habits: 40 Stories to Uplift the Mind and Transform the Heart. Penguin Random House India Private Limited. ISBN 978-93-5708-662-2.

== Awards and recognition ==
Gauranga Das received the Dalmia Bharat Rural Development and Infrastructure – CSRBOX CSR Impact Award 2023 in Rural Development and Infrastructure. He was awarded the 'Pride of India' Magna Award for his contributions to society through community service on 23 October 2023. He has been recognized as an IGBC Fellow by the Indian Green Building Council for his contributions to the green building movement. He received an Honorary Doctorate from Kaziranga University in Assam.
