= Rishihood University =

Private university in Haryana, India

- Type: Private
- Established: 2020; 6 years ago
- Chancellor: Suresh Prabhu
- Vice-Chancellor: Shobhit Mathur
- Location: Sonipat, Haryana, India
- Website: Official website

Rishihood University is an Indian private university located in Sonipat, Haryana. It was established in 2020 by the Haryana Private Universities (Amendment) Act, 2020 of the Haryana Legislative Assembly. It is founded as a collective philanthropy by entrepreneurs, academics, and social leaders including Motilal Oswal, Chandraprakash Dwivedi, Gauranga Das and others. Suresh Prabhu is the Chancellor and S. P. Kothari chairs the Board of Advisors of the university.

== Schools ==
The university consists of five schools:

- School of Design
- School of Entrepreneurship
- Mahesh Navani School of Brain, Body, and Behaviour
- Rashtram School of Public Leadership
- Sajjan Agarwal School of Technology

== Academics ==
The University offers undergraduate and postgraduate courses in technology, entrepreneurship, design, and psychology. The university has academic and research links with Ural State University, Russia and Kyungdong University, South Korea.

== Programs Offered ==
Undergraduate (UG) Programs (4-year full-time, mandatory residential campus):

• B.Tech: Computer Science & Artificial Intelligence (CS & AI), Computer Science & Data Science Rishihood Tech Program

• B.Des (Bachelor of Design): Communication Design, Fashion and Textile, Product Design

• BBA: Entrepreneurship, General Management (Makers Undergrad)

• B.Sc. (Hons): Psychology

• Doctoral Programs: Ph.D. across multiple disciplines

• Foundation Program: A mandatory 1-year general foundation curriculum (6 courses) for first-year undergraduate students to build self-awareness and understanding of global/societal challenges before deep-diving into a major.

== Placements & Career Highlights ==
• Highest Package: Up to ₹12.5 LPA – ₹50 LPA (depending on the cohort report)

• Average Package: ₹7.0 LPA – ₹7.5 LPA

• Median Package: ₹6.0 LPA

• Recruiters & Partners: 50+ corporate and industry partners, plus access to student venture funds and incubation projects.

== Addissions & Eligibility ==
• General Eligibility: Minimum 60% aggregate or 6 CGPA in Grade 12 (10+2) for undergraduate programs.

• Accepted Entrance Exams: RSAT (Rishihood Scholastic Aptitude Test), CUET, SAT India, UCEED, JEE, NID, UGC NET, GPAT, and ICAR AICE depending on the program.

• Selection Process: Digital application, aptitude test/scores review, and a virtual/personal interview.

• Application Rounds (Typical Schedule):

• Round 1: November 15 – January 31

• Round 2: February 1 – March 31

• Round 3: April 1 – June 30

== Notable faculty ==
- Sampadananda Mishra

== Recognition and approval ==
Rishihood University is established under The Haryana Private Universities (Amendment) Act, 2020. The university is approved by the University Grants Commission (India).

== Campus ==
The University campus is spread over 25 acres situated in Sonipat, Haryana.

=== Accommodation & Dining ===
• Hostels: Modern, well-appointed, luxury student rooms capable of accommodating all admitted students. Each floor features common utilities like high-speed Wi-Fi, water fountains, refrigerators, and microwaves.

• Mess & Dining: Spacious mess facilities serving wholesome, nutritious meals, supplemented by campus cafeteria and canteen options.

=== Sports & Fitness ===
• Swimming Pool: A semi-Olympic-sized swimming pool complete with trained coaches and lifeguards.

• Courts & Gym: Dedicated facilities for badminton, basketball, tennis, football, and a full-fledged gymnasium. Physical activity and sports are integrated into routine student life.

=== Campus Infrastructure & Facilities ===
• Library & Academic Blocks: A prominent, extensive library stocked with books, research articles, and digital databases. Air-conditioned, modern classrooms equipped with latest audio-visual technology.

• Labs & Innovation: Immersive Media Labs (supporting AI, VR, and AR) and specialized practical workshops.

• Healthcare & Support: On-campus medical and healthcare support facilities.

=== Culture, Events & Student Life ===
Damru ’26 is the official annual flagship cultural festival of Rishihood University.

Event Details:

• Dates: November 28–29, 2026

• Theme / Focus: Royal heritage, traditional music, puppet theatre, and the vibrant culture of Rajasthan ("The Royal Cultural Extravaganza").

Regular cultural events ("Culture Comes Alive"), live musical performances (featuring artists like Singer-songwriter Gajendra Verma performed live at Damru 2025 , Jassi Gill and Babbal Rai

Nikhil D'Souza and Vani Bassin), design seminars, guest lectures, and unique activities like drone racing competitions.

• Milestones & Traditions: Signature campus challenges, such as the 100 km walk endurance test and experiential "From Ideas to Impact" projects.

• Common Spaces: Happiness corners, social common rooms, and outdoor spaces designed for student interaction and relaxation.

You can explore more details or look into program-specific updates directly on the Rishihood University Website (www.rishihood.edu.in) .

Modern Gurukul Philosophy: It blends traditional Indian wisdom and character-building with Western-style multidisciplinary education.

== Notable student and entrepreneurial success stories from the university include ==
=== Student & Startup Success Stories ===
• Shaurya and Hastakala: During his second year in the BBA in Entrepreneurship program, student Shaurya founded Hastakala, an online marketplace dedicated to empowering Indian artists and artisans. The platform offers digital formats and print-on-demand products (such as posters, merchandise, and curated art prints) to help creators sell work and get paid fairly. What started with two co-founders has grown into a student team of 25 people with six-figure sales.

• Manat Agarwal (Founder-First BBA): Manat Agarwal transferred or dropped out of a previous college after being told he couldn't be both a founder and a student. He joined Rishihood University to take advantage of its founder-first ecosystem, programs like Jumpstart (which offers early micro-funding for student startups), and the Venture Studio model that supports campus entrepreneurs.

• Computer Science, Data Science & Design Projects: First-year BCh/B.Tech (including CS & DS) and design students at Rishihood engage in hands-on labs (AI, Robotics, IoT) from day one. This has led to students building early prototypes, winning hackathons, securing corporate internships, and getting direct faculty mentorship to streamline product and communication design.

=== Institutional & Placement Overview ===
• Placements & Packages: Recent placement data for Rishihood University reports a highest package of INR 12.5 LPA and an average package of around INR 7.5 LPA.

• Public & Community Feedback: While the university promotes a startup and modern "Gurukul" philosophy, public and forum discussions reflect mixed experiences. Some observers and student reviews on platforms like Quora debate the consistency of campus placement support versus independent student hustle
