= Development Dialogue =

International conference on social entrepreneurship

- Headquarters: Hubballi
- Key people: Dr. Desh Deshpande, Jaishree Deshpande, Naveen Jha, Dilip Modi, Raju Reddy
- Website: www.developmentdialogue.org

Development Dialogue is an international conference on social entrepreneurship held by Deshpande Foundation, a non-governmental organization founded in 1996 by Dr. Desh Deshpande and Jaishree Deshpande.

During this Dialogue, delegates from diverse sectors and geographies come together to share proven models, innovations and transforming perspectives about improving social infrastructure. Sessions on different aspects of social entrepreneurship are conducted during this conference with keynote addresses from Deshpande Foundation, partners and its associated organizations. This includes featured speakers, business-track specific offerings, and panel discussions.

Development Dialogue is held annually in the three Sandbox regions :

== Hubli Sandbox ==
Since 2008, Hubli Sandbox in Hubballi, India has been organizing the Development Dialogue.

== Ek Soch Sandbox ==
The Ek Soch Sandbox in Varanasi was co-founded by Dilip Modi, the pioneering telecom entrepreneur in India and Naveen Jha, CEO of Deshpande Foundation, India. The first Ek Soch Development Dialogue was conducted in 2016.

== Kakatiya Sandbox ==
The Kakatiya Sandbox in Telangana is a co-creation of Raju Reddy, Founder and former CEO of Sierra Atlantic and Phanindra Sama, co-founder of Redbus.in. The first Kakatiya Development Dialogue was conducted in 2016.

== History ==
=== 2008 ===
The first Development Dialogue was held at the IMSR Business School in Hubballi, Karnataka in January 2008. Over 200 delegates from partner organizations came together to discuss their work in the Sandbox.

=== 2009 ===
The second Dialogue was held on June 2 - 3 based on the theme ‘Sandbox & Global Perspectives’ where innovation in the Sandbox was highlighted.

=== 2010 ===
This dialogue held on June 21 - 22 featured over 40 speakers in various sector-based panels with the theme ‘Changing Mindsets’.

=== 2011 ===
Theme ‘Leveraging Opportunity’ held on January 27 - 29

=== 2012 ===
Theme ‘Value Chain' held on January 15 - 17

=== 2013 ===
Theme 'Tipping Point' held on January 30 - February 1

=== 2014 ===
Theme 'Counting What Matters' held on January 20 - 22

=== 2015 ===
Theme 'Scaling by Proving' held on February 6 - 8

=== 2016 ===
Theme - 'Innovate globally, Execute locally' held on February 6 - 7

=== 2017 ===
This year, the Development Dialogue, themed ‘Scaling Effectively’ is going to be held on January 28 - 29.
