= Akshata Murty =

Indian businesswoman (born 1980)

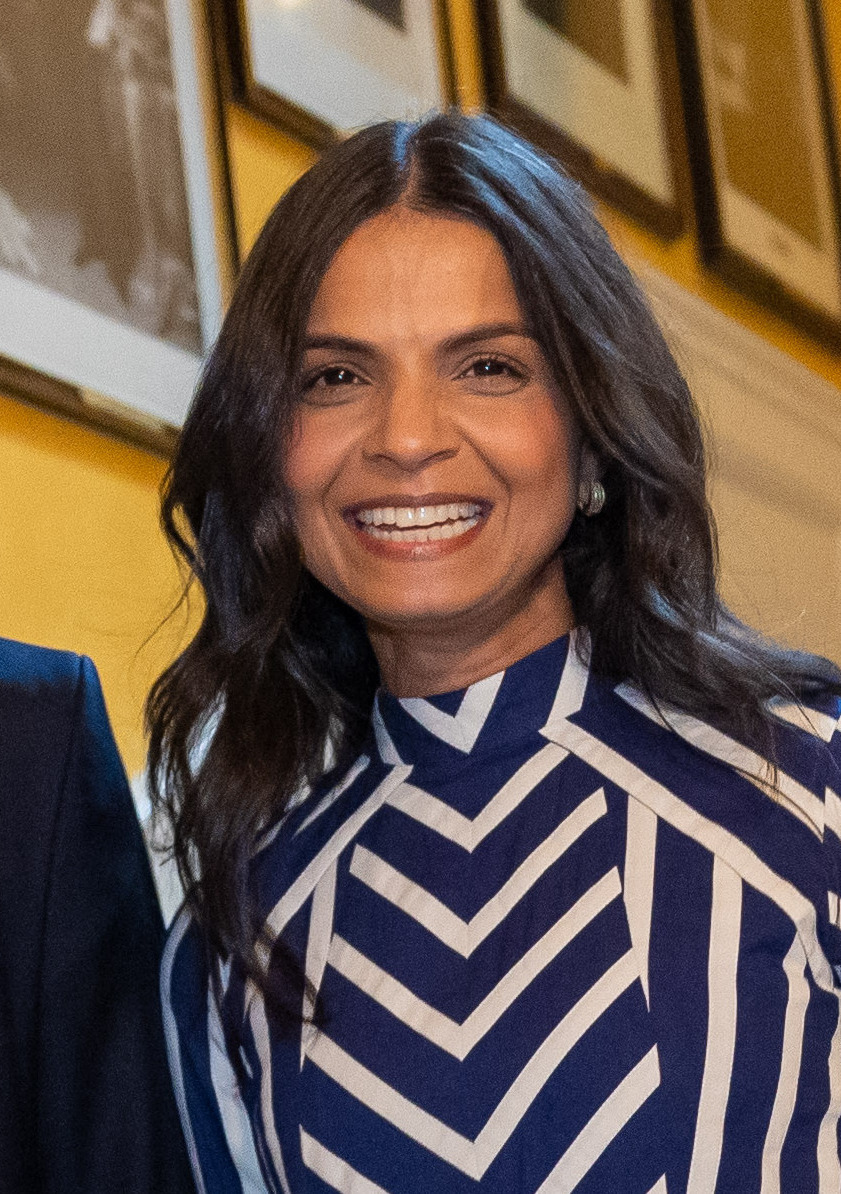
- Murty in 2024
- Born: Akshata Narayana Murty; 25 April 1980 (age 46); Hubli, Dharwad District Karnataka, India
- Citizenship: Indian
- Education: Claremont McKenna College (BA); Fashion Institute of Design & Merchandising; Stanford University (MBA)
- Occupation: Businesswoman
- Known for: Daughter of Infosys Founder N. R. Narayana Murthy; Spouse of the Prime Minister of the United Kingdom
- Political party: Conservative
- Spouse: Rishi Sunak (m. 2009)
- Children: 2
- Parents: N. R. Narayana Murthy (father); Sudha Murty (mother)
- Relatives: Rohan Murty (brother); Shrinivas Kulkarni (uncle); Gururaj Deshpande (uncle)
- Akshata Murty's voice Murty's speech at the 2023 Conservative Party Conference; Recorded 4 October 2023

Akshata Narayana Murty (Note: /ˌækʃəˈtɑː nəˈraɪənə ˈmɜːrti/; Hindi: [ˈəkʂət̪aː naːˈɾaːjəɳ(ə) ˈmuːɾt̪iː]) (born 25 April 1980) is an Indian heiress, businesswoman, fashion designer, and venture capitalist. She is married to former prime minister of the United Kingdom Rishi Sunak and is the daughter of N. R. Narayana Murthy, a founder of the Indian multinational IT company Infosys, and Sudha Murty. She holds a 0.93 percent stake in Infosys, along with shares in several other British businesses.

Since 2009, she has been married to Rishi Sunak, the former prime minister of the United Kingdom and leader of the Conservative Party from 2022 to 2024. He also served as Chancellor of the Exchequer from 2020 to 2022 in Prime Minister Boris Johnson's cabinet, as well as Leader of the Opposition from July to November 2024. According to the Sunday Times Rich List, Murty and Sunak hold the 245th rank for the richest people in Britain as of 2024, with a combined wealth of £651 million (US$827 million). In 2022, her personal wealth became the topic of British media discussion in the context of her claim of non-domiciled status, an arrangement seen as benefiting the "super rich." Murty later voluntarily renounced the fiscal benefits from her non-domiciled status.

== Early life and education ==
Akshata Naryana Murty was born in April 1980 in Hubballi, India, and was raised by her maternal grandparents while her father, N. R. Narayana Murthy, and her mother, Sudha Murty, worked to launch their technology company, Infosys. Her mother was the first female engineer to work for the TATA Engineering and Locomotive Company, then India's largest car maker, and later became a philanthropist. Murty has one brother, Rohan Murty, and they were brought up in Jayanagar, a neighbourhood in the Southern part of India's Silicon Valley and Financial Technology Capital, Bengaluru. Her maternal grandparents were R. H. Kulkarni, a surgeon, and his wife Vimala Kulkarni, a school teacher.

In the 1990s, Murty attended Baldwin Girls' High School in Bengaluru, and in 1998 studied Economics and French at Claremont McKenna College in Claremont, California. She has a Diploma in clothes manufacturing from the Fashion Institute of Design and Merchandising in Los Angeles, and a Master of Business Administration from Stanford University.

== Career and investments ==
In 2007, Murty joined the Dutch cleantech firm Tendris as its marketing director, where she worked for two years, before leaving to start her own fashion firm. Her fashion label closed in 2012.

In 2013, she became the director of venture capital fund Catamaran Ventures. She co-founded, with her husband Rishi Sunak, the London branch of the Indian firm owned by her father, N. R. Narayana Murthy. Sunak transferred his shares to her shortly before being elected as the Conservative MP for Richmond in 2015. Since 2015, she has owned a 0.91% or 0.93% share of her father's technology firm Infosys, valued at around £481 million in 2023, and shares in two of Jamie Oliver's restaurant businesses, Wendy's in India, and Koru Kids. This made her richer than Queen Elizabeth II as of April 2022, and richer than King Charles III as of October 2022. As of 2022, Murthy was a director at Digme Fitness, and also Soroco, the digital transformation company that her brother Rohan Murty co-founded.

== Personal life ==
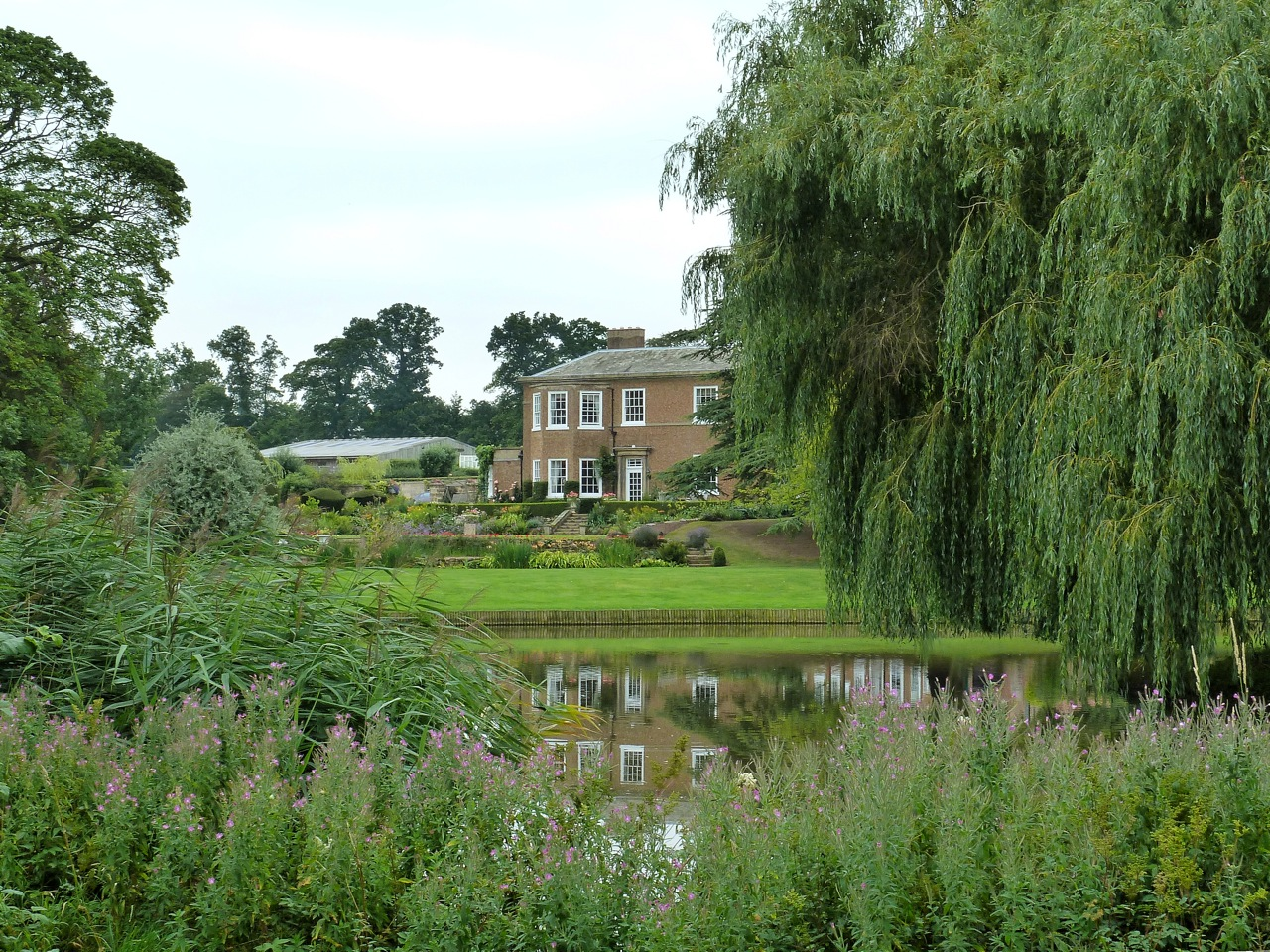
Kirby Sigston Manor, North Yorkshire

Murty is an Indian citizen. She speaks English, Hindi, Kannada and French. In August 2009, Murty married Rishi Sunak, whom she met in 2004 at Stanford University. They have two daughters, Anoushka and Krishna. The couple own Kirby Sigston Manor in the village of Kirby Sigston, North Yorkshire, as well as a mews house in Earl's Court, Kensington and Chelsea; a flat on Old Brompton Road, South Kensington; and a penthouse apartment on Ocean Avenue in Santa Monica, California. In April 2022, it was reported that Sunak and Murty had moved out of 11 Downing Street to a newly refurbished West London home.

In April 2022, Murty's wealth became the focus of British media discussion that noted her non-domiciled resident status in the United Kingdom, which entitled her to pay no tax on her income outside Britain, subject to an annual payment of £30,000. Later the same month, Murty announced that she would give up her non-domiciled status and pay UK taxes on her worldwide income voluntarily. If Murty pays UK taxes on her worldwide income, but retains her non-domiciliary status, she can benefit from a provision in a 1956 treaty that was designed to help avoid double taxation of Indian citizens in India as well as the UK.

== Notes ==
Unofficial roles
Preceded by Hugh O'Leary	Spouse of the Prime Minister of the United Kingdom; 2022–2024	Succeeded by Victoria Starmer
