= Rohan Murty =

Indian entrepreneur (born 1982 or 1983)

- Born: 1982 or 1983 (age 42–43); Hubballi, Karnataka, India
- Education: Cornell University (BS); Harvard University (PhD)
- Occupation: Entrepreneur
- Title: Founder and CTO, Soroco; founder of Murty Classical Library of India; founder and CEO, Workfabric AI; junior fellow at the Harvard Society of Fellows
- Spouses: Lakshmi Venu (m. 2011; div. 2015); Aparna Krishnan (m. 2019)
- Children: 1
- Parents: N. R. Narayana Murty (father); Sudha Murty (mother)
- Family: Akshata Murty (sister); Rishi Sunak (brother-in-law); Shrinivas Kulkarni (uncle); Gururaj Deshpande (uncle)

Rohan Narayana Murty is the founder of the Murty Classical Library of India, founder and CTO of the digital transformation company Soroco, and founder and CTO of Workfabric AI. He was the second computer scientist elected to the Harvard Society of Fellows in its nearly 100-year history, after Marvin Minsky.

== Background and personal life ==
Murty is the son of N. R. Narayana Murthy, founder of Infosys, and his wife Sudha Murty, an engineer and author. Shrinivas Kulkarni, a professor of astrophysics and planetary science at California Institute of Technology, is his maternal uncle and is said to have been a major influence on Murty. Murty grew up with a passion for programming. He has an older sister, Akshata Murty, wife of former UK Prime Minister Rishi Sunak.

Murty studied at the Bishop Cotton Boys' School in Bangalore. After completing his twelfth standard board exams, he moved to the US, where he obtained a BS degree in computer science from Cornell University in 2005. This was followed by a PhD in computer engineering from Harvard University, which he obtained in 2011. The subject of his thesis was opportunistic wireless networks, networks that work by continually seeking and using underused portions of the spectrum, and vacating them if any incumbent returns. His doctoral research was supported by a Siebel Scholars Fellowship and a Microsoft Research Fellowship.

Rohan was briefly married to Lakshmi Venu (Srinivasan), daughter of Venu Srinivasan, chairman of TVS Motors, and Mallika Srinivasan, CEO of TAFE. The wedding was held in June 2011; however, the couple separated in 2013 and were granted a divorce in October 2015. In December 2019, he married Aparna Krishnan, daughter of former Indian Navy officer K.R. Krishnan and his wife, Savithri Krishnan, a retired employee of SBI. Murty and Aparna have a son, born on 10 November 2023.

== Corporate career ==
In June 2013, Murty was appointed as an executive assistant at the Chairman's Office reporting to Narayana Murthy at Infosys, when Narayana Murthy returned to the company. His appointment as Vice President at Infosys was subject to approval by the Indian Ministry of Corporate Affairs. Murty left Infosys on 14 June 2014, when his father stepped down as Executive Chairman. As of 1 June 2013, Murty is said to have owned Infosys shares worth $347 million.

== Murty Classical Library ==
Although he does not read Sanskrit, when Murty was a doctoral student of computer science at Harvard, he took a class focusing on Kumarila Bhatta's Shlokavartika, which got him interested in ancient Indian philosophy and sciences.

He is the founder of the Murty Classical Library of India, a continuation of the Clay Sanskrit Library Project headed by Sheldon Pollock. In 2016, he rejected a petition asking that Pollock be removed from the position of chief editor of the Murty Classical Library.
