= Henning Melber =

German political scientist

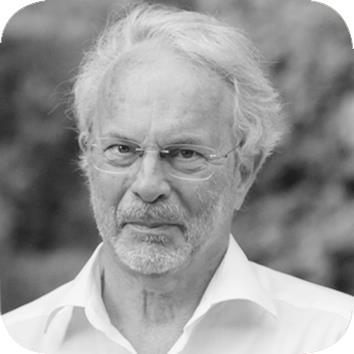
- Melber in 2022
- Born: 22 August 1950 (age 76); Stuttgart, Germany
- Title: Prof. Dr.

Academic background
- Education: Free University of Berlin; University of Bremen

Academic work
- Discipline: Political science; History of science; Sociology
- Institutions: Nordic Africa Institute; Dag Hammarskjöld Foundation; Uppsala University

Henning Melber (born 22 August 1950) is a German political scientist and sociologist. He is a German-Namibian and Swedish Africanist and political activist.

== Biography ==
Born in Stuttgart, Melber grew up in Esslingen am Neckar and Leutkirch in Baden-Württemberg, Germany. He moved to Namibia in 1967 as a teenager and the son of German immigrants, and graduated from the German Higher Private School Windhoek in 1970. In 1974, he joined the SWAPO liberation movement. From 1975 to 1989 he was banned from entering Namibia and until 1993 also to South Africa. After Namibia's independence (21 March 1990) he returned to Namibia. In 2000 he moved to Sweden.

In the 1970s, Melber studied Political Science and Sociology at the Free University of Berlin. He received a PhD in 1980 at the University of Bremen with a thesis on School and Colonialism. From 1982 to 1992 he was a research assistant in the social sciences department at the University of Kassel. In 1993 he habilitated at the University of Bremen and was appointed lecturer in development sociology (venia legendi for development sociology).

From 1992 to 2000 he was Head of the Namibian Economic Policy Research Unit (NEPRU) in Windhoek. From 1994 to 2000 he was chairman of the Namibisch-Deutsche Stiftung in Windhoek. From 1996 to 1998 he was also chairman of the Association of Namibian Publishers (ANP). In 2000, he joined the Nordiska Afrikainstitutet in Uppsala, Sweden. After that, he headed the Swedish Dag Hammarskjöld Foundation from 2006 to 2012, where he is currently still a member in an advisory capacity.

Since 2012 Melber has been an extraordinary professor at the Institute of Political Science at the University of Pretoria in South Africa. Since 2013 he has also been an associate professor at the Center for Gender and Africa Studies at the Free State University (Bloemfontein) in South Africa. From 2017 to 2023 he was President of the European Association of Development Research and Training Institutes ( EADI) in Bonn. Since 2015 he has been a Senior Research Fellow at the Institute of Commonwealth Studies of the University of London.

Melber was also a visiting scholar at the Cluster of Excellence: Cultural Foundations of Social Integration at the University of Konstanz (April/May 2018), Van Zyl Slabbert Visiting professor at the University of Cape Town (October/November 2017) and visiting scholar at Bayreuth Academy of Advanced African Studies (University of Bayreuth), (April/May 2016).

Henning Melber is married and has one daughter.

== Awards ==
- Conversation Africa Science Communication Award, University of Pretoria in 2020 and 2021 in the category Science Communication Excellence.
- internationally acclaimed researcher und B2-scholar National Research Foundation (South Africa) (NRF), 2018.

== Publications ==
Melber has published numerous books and several hundred contributions on Namibia's problems and history, as well as on other topics such as internationalism and racism:

- School and Colonialism: The Formal Education of Namibia, Hamburg 1979.
- The whiteness of the last conclusion: racism and colonial gaze. Brandes & Apsel, Frankfurt 1992, ISBN 3-86099-102-7 .
- Opportunities of international civil society. (with Reinhart Kößler) Suhrkamp, Frankfurt am Main 1993, ISBN 3-518-11797-1.
- A New Scramble for Africa? Imperialism, Investment and Development. (Eds., with Roger Southall) Scottsville, University of KwaZulu-Natal Press 2009, ISBN 978-1-86914-171-4.
- "The United Nations and Regional Challenges in Africa - 50 Years after Dag Hammarskjöld". (Eds., with Maxi Schoeman) In Development Dialogue, no.57, December 2011, ISBN 978-91-85214-63-1 .
- Understanding Namibia. Jacana Media, Cape Town 2014, ISBN 978-1-4314-2133-6. (Also Oxford University Press, London 2015, ISBN 978-0190241568 ).
- Namibia - Socio-political explorations since independence. Brandes & Apsel, Frankfurt a. M. 2015, ISBN 978-3-95558-109-1 .
- Genocide - and then what? The policy of German-Namibian past processing. (with Reinhart Kößler) Brandes & Apsel, Frankfurt, 2017, ISBN 978-3-95558-193-0 .
