= Sudha Murty =

Member of Rajya Sabha (born 1950)

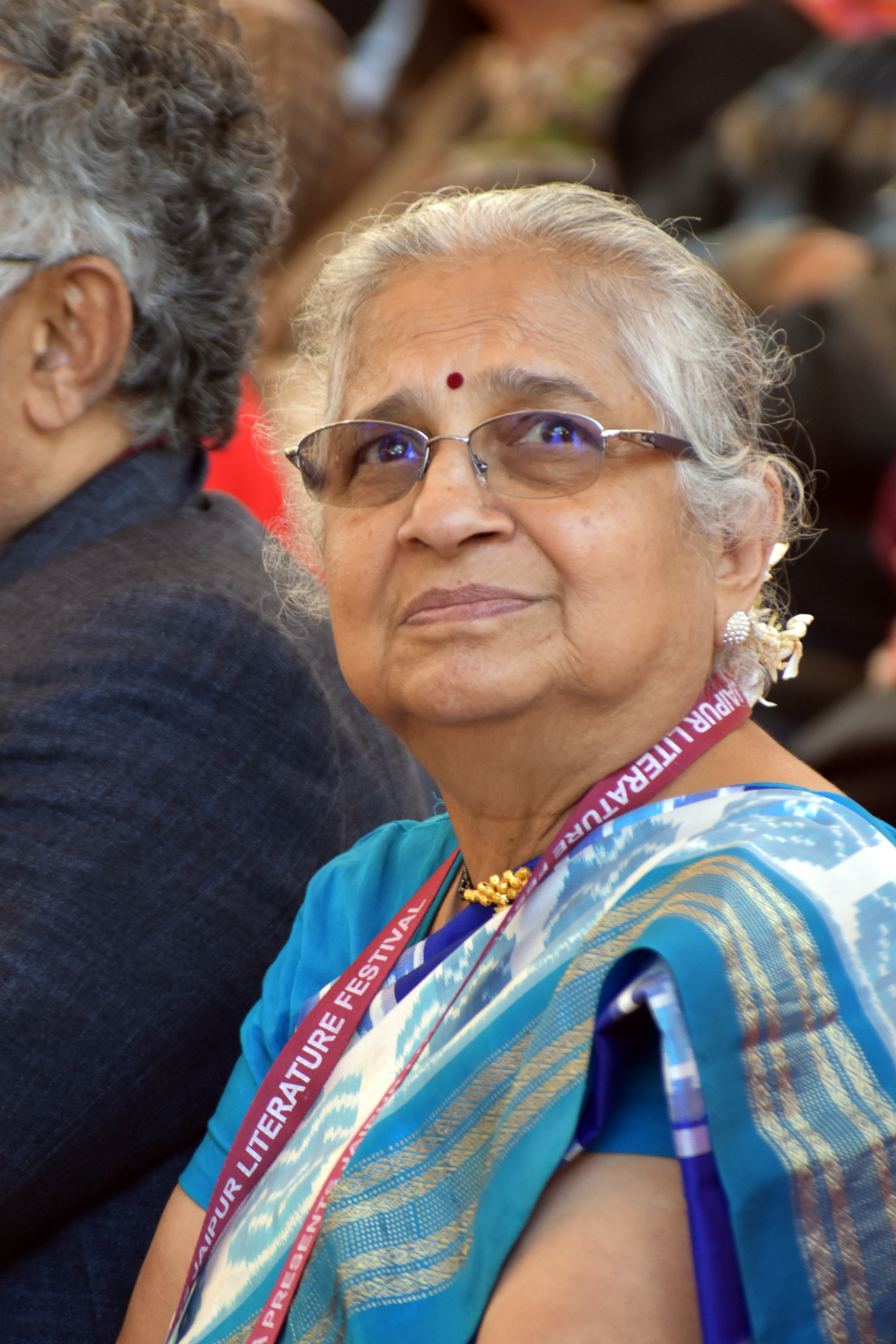
- Murty in 2026

Member of Parliament, Rajya Sabha
- Incumbent
- Assumed office 8 March 2024
- Nominated by: Droupadi Murmu
- Constituency: Nominated (Philanthropy, Literature & Education)

Personal details
- Born: Sudha Ramchandra Kulkarni; 19 August 1950 (age 76) Shiggaon, Bombay State, India (present-day Karnataka)
- Party: Nominated
- Spouse: N. R. Narayana Murthy (m. 1978)
- Children: Akshata Murty (daughter); Rohan Murty (son)
- Relatives: Shrinivas Kulkarni (brother); Sunanda Kulkarni (sister); Gururaj Deshpande (brother-in-law); Rishi Sunak (son-in-law)
- Education: KLE Technological University (BE); Indian Institute of Science (ME)
- Occupation: Educator; author; philanthropist
- Awards: Padma Shri (2006); Daana Chintamani Attimabbe Award; Bal Sahitya Puraskar (2023); Padma Bhushan (2023)
- Organisation: Infosys Foundation
- Notable work: Mahashweta (2000); Dollar Bahu (2003); How I Taught My Grandmother to Read (2004)

Sudha Murty (née Kulkarni; born 19 August 1950) is an Indian educator, author, and philanthropist. She is the Founder-Chairperson of the non-profit charitable organization Infosys Foundation. She is married to the co-founder of Infosys, N. R. Narayana Murthy. Murty was nominated as Member of Parliament, Rajya Sabha on 8 March 2024 for her contribution to social work and education. Murty was awarded the Padma Shri, the fourth highest civilian award in India, for social work by the Government of India in 2006. In 2023, she was awarded the Padma Bhushan, the third highest civilian award in India.

Sudha Murty began her professional career in computer science and engineering. She is a member of the public health care initiatives of the Gates Foundation. She has founded several orphanages, participated in rural development efforts, supported the movement to provide all Karnataka government schools with computer and library facilities, and established Murty Classical Library of India at Harvard University.

Murty is best known for her philanthropy and her contribution to literature in Kannada and English. Dollar Bahu (lit. 'Dollar Daughter-in-Law'), a novel originally authored by her in Kannada and later translated into English as Dollar Bahu, was adapted as a televised dramatic series by Zee TV in 2001. Runa (lit. 'Debt'), a story by Sudha Murty was adapted as a Marathi film, Pitruroon by director Nitish Bhardwaj. Sudha Murty has also acted in the film as well as a Kannada film Prarthana.

== Early life and education ==
Sudha Murty was born to a Kannada-speaking family on 19 August 1950 in Shiggaon, Haveri district in Mysore State (present-day Karnataka), India, the daughter of R. H. Kulkarni, a surgeon, and his wife Vimala Kulkarni, a schoolteacher. She was raised by her parents and maternal grandparents. These childhood experiences form the historical basis for her first notable work entitled How I Taught My Grandmother to Read, Wise and Otherwise and Other Stories. Murty completed a BEng in Electrical and Electronics Engineering from the B.V.B. College of Engineering & Technology (now known as KLE Technological University), and then a MEng in Computer Science from the Indian Institute of Science.

== Career ==
Sudha Murty became the first female engineer hired at India's largest auto manufacturer TATA Engineering and Locomotive Company (TELCO). She joined the company as a Development Engineer in Pune and then worked in Mumbai and Jamshedpur as well. She had written a postcard to the company's Chairman complaining of the "men only" gender bias at TELCO. As a result, she was granted a special interview and hired immediately. She later joined Walchand Group of Industries at Pune as Senior Systems Analyst.

In 1996, she started Infosys Foundation and retired in 2020. She also taught at Christ University.

Sudha Murty has written and published many books which include novels, non-fiction, travelogues, technical books, and memoirs. Her books have been translated into all major Indian languages. She was a columnist for English and Kannada newspapers.

== Philanthropy ==
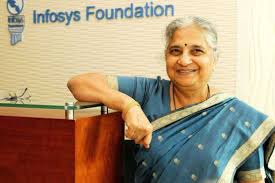
Sudha Murty at the Infosys Foundation

Murty's Infosys Foundation is a public charitable trust founded in 1996.

== Personal life ==
Sudha Murty is married to Infosys co-founder N. R. Narayana Murthy. They married when she was employed as an engineer at TELCO in Pune. The couple have two children, including fashion designer Akshata Murty, who is married to former Prime Minister of the United Kingdom Rishi Sunak, and Rohan Murty, a computer scientist and founder of enterprise software company Soroco.

Her siblings include Dr. Sunanda Kulkarni, Caltech astrophysicist Shrinivas Kulkarni and Jaishree Deshpande (wife of Gururaj Deshpande) who co-founded the Deshpande Center for Technological Innovation at MIT.

== Awards ==
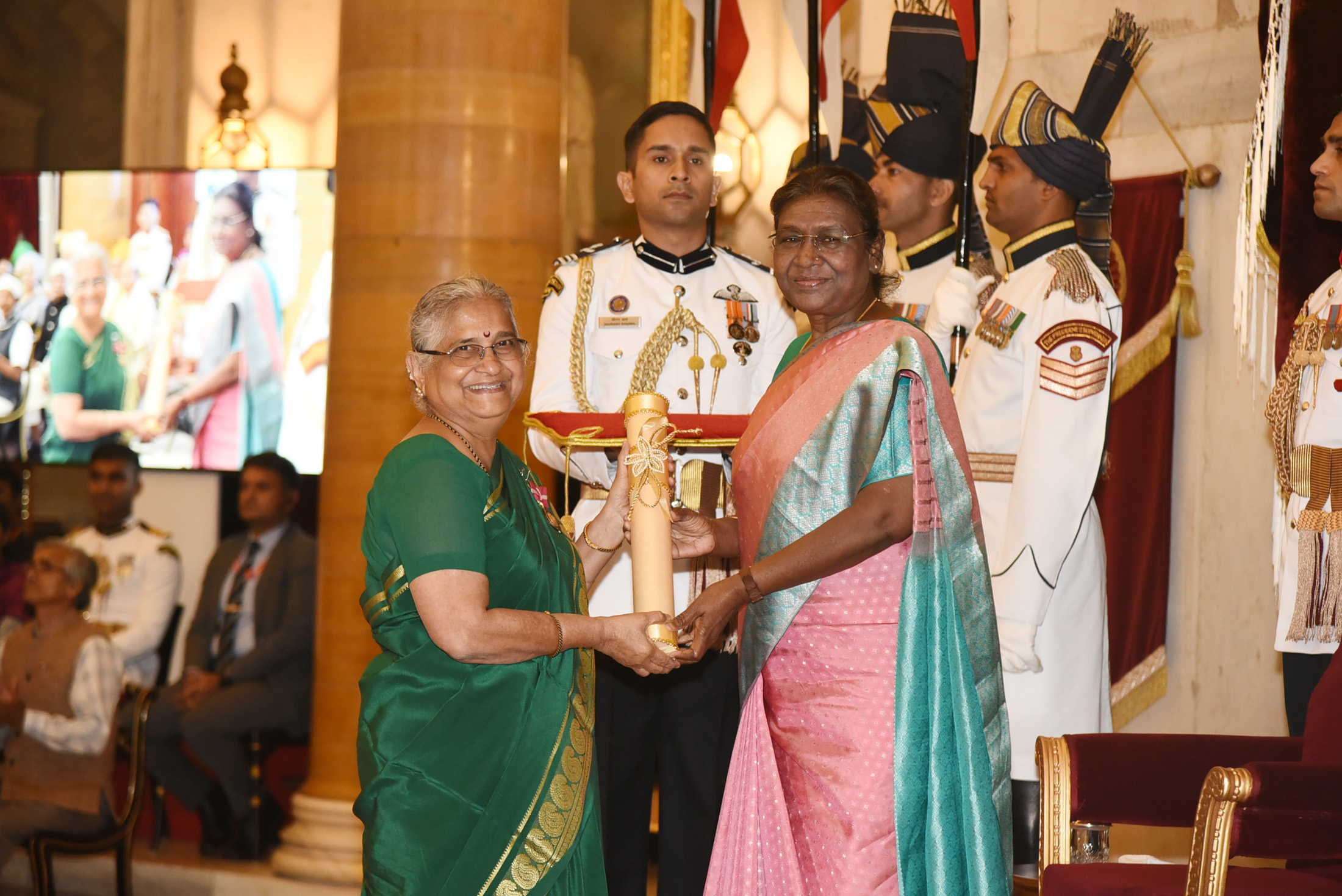
Droupadi Murmu presenting the Padma Bhushan Award to Dr. (Smt.) Sudha Murthy

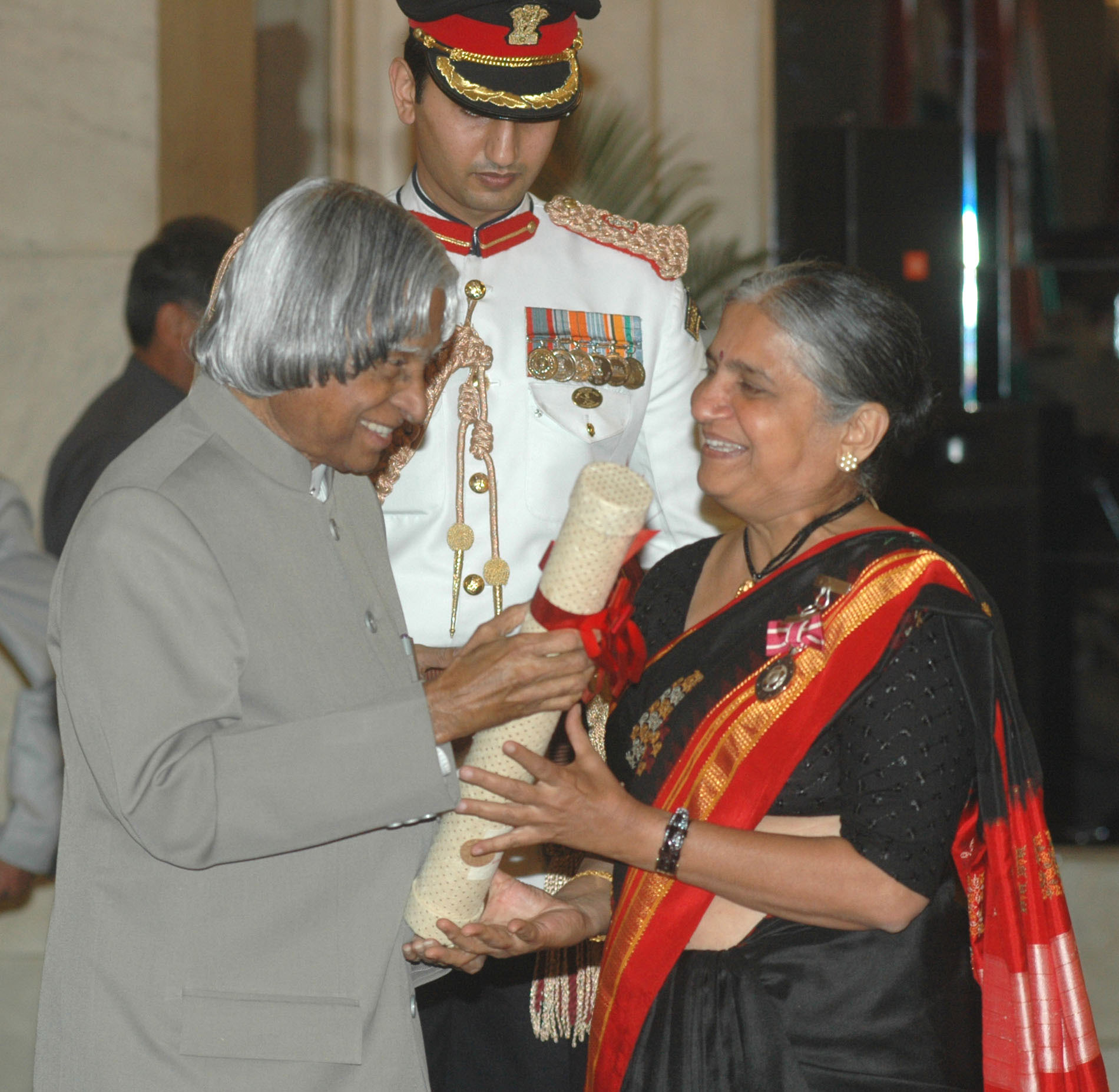
A. P. J. Abdul Kalam presenting the Padma Shri Award to Dr. (Smt.) Sudha Murthy

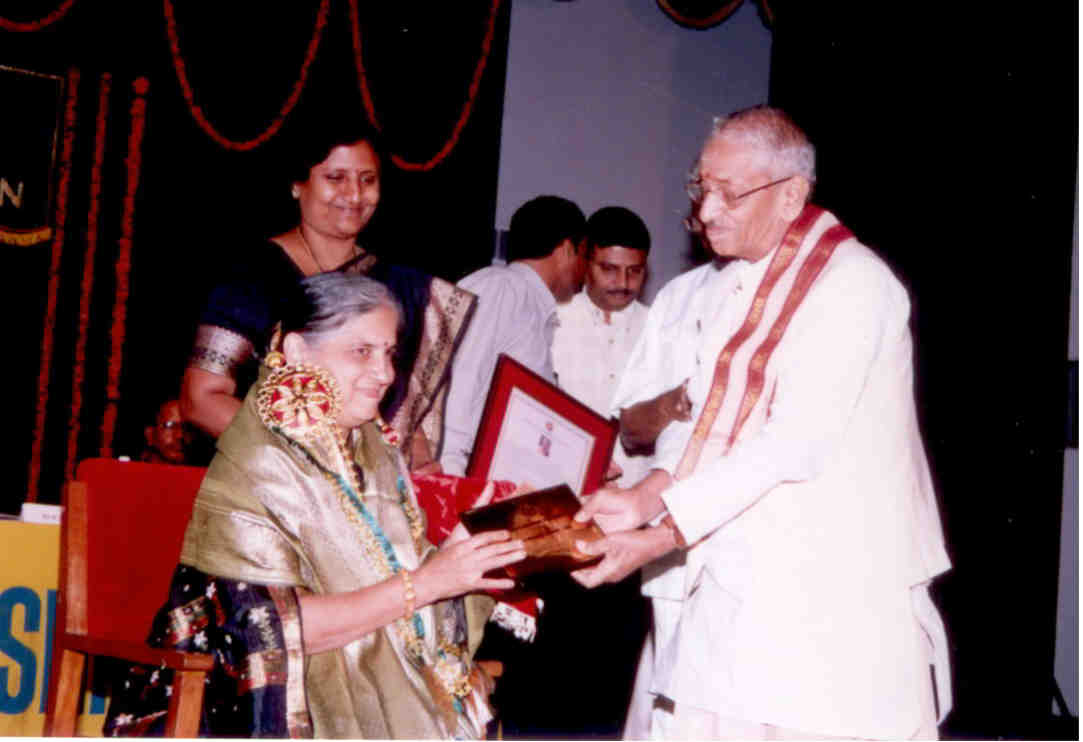
Murthy receiving the Raja Lakshmi Award

- 2004: Raja-Lakshmi Award by Sri Raja-Lakshmi Foundation in Chennai
- 2006: India's fourth highest civilian award Padma Shri
- 2006: She also received the R.K. Narayana's Award for Literature.
- 2010: Daana Chintamani Attimabbe Award by Karnataka Government.
- 2011: Murty was conferred honorary LL.D (Doctor of Laws) degrees for contributions to promote formal legal education and scholarship in India.
- 2013: Basava Shree-2013 Award was presented to Narayan Murty & Sudha Murty for their contributions to society.
- 2018: Murty received the Crossword Book award in popular (Non-Fiction) category.
- 2019: IIT Kanpur awarded her Honorary Degree (Honoris Causa) of Doctor of Science.
- 2023: Padma Bhushan by the Government of India
- 2023: Sahitya Akademi Bal Sahitya Puraskar.
- 2023: The Global Indian Award, which is worth $50, 000, is given each year to a prominent Indian who has made a major mark in his or her chosen field. Her husband Narayana Murthy too got the same award in 2014, so they became first couple conferred with this award. She donated the sum to the Field Institute (University of Toronto).

== Bibliography ==
=== Books ===
Kannada

- Computer lokadalli (2000)
- Hakkiya Teradali (2003)
- Guttondu Heluve (2006)
- Saamaanyralli Asaamaanyaru (2006)
- Athirikthe (2007)
- Tumula (2007)
- Yashasvi (2007)
- Runa (2008)
- Sukeshini Mattu Itara Makkala Kathegalu (2008)
- Paridhi (2009)
- Yerilitada Daariyalli (2017)
- Kaveri inda Mekaangige
- Nooniya Sahasagalu
- Vidyayardaka sanga (2020)

Marathi

- Astitva (2002)

English

- Wise and Otherwise (2002)
- Mahashweta (2002)
- How I Taught My Grandmother to Read and Other Stories (2004)
- The Old Man And His God (2006)
- Gently Falls The Bakula (2008)
- The Bird with Golden Wings (2009)
- The Day I Stopped Drinking Milk (2012)
- Grandma's Bag of Stories (2012)
- House of Cards (2013)
- Dollar Bahu (2013)
- The Magic Drum and Other Favorite Stories (2013)
- The Mother I Never Knew (2014)
- Something Happened on the Way To Heavens (2014)
- The Magic of the Lost Temple (2015)
- The Serpent's Revenge (2016)
- Three Thousand Stitches (2017)
- The Man from the Egg (2017)
- Here, There, Everywhere (2018)
- The Upside Down King (2018)
- How The Sea Became Salty (2019)
- The Daughter From A Wishing Tree (2019)
- How The Onion got its layers (2020)
- Grandparents Bag of Stories (2020)
- The Gopi Diaries: Coming Home (2020)
- The Gopi Diaries: Finding Love (2021)
- The Sage With Two Horns (2021)
- The Gopi Diaries: Growing Up (2022)
- Common yet uncommon (2023)
- The Magic of the Lost story (2022)
- How to Be Happy with Who You Are (2025)
- The Magic of the Lost Earrings (2025)
