= Hubli Sandbox =

- Founded: 2008
- Headquarters: Hubballi
- Key people: Dr. Desh Deshpande; Jaishree Deshpande; Naveen Jha; Dr. Neelam Maheshwari
- Website: https://deshpandefoundationindia.org/

Hubli Sandbox in Hubballi, India is an entrepreneurship program launched by the Deshpande Foundation that supports local entrepreneurs to come up with sustainable and scalable enterprises having social and economic impact. It was founded by Jaishree Deshpande and her husband Gururaj "Desh" Deshpande in 2008.

== Programs ==
Hubli Sandbox runs many programs in the areas of education, student leadership, agriculture, micro-entrepreneurship, and maternal health. Major programs are Sandbox Startups, Navodyami, Grantmaking & partnerships, Deshpande Educational Trust (DET), LEADers' Accelerating Development (LEAD), Agriculture, Healthcare, and Global Exchange Program. The Development Dialogue is the annual international conference of social entrepreneurship conducted by Hubli Sandbox. NR Narayana Murthy also attended Sandbox Hubli’s Startup Dialogue 2019 event.
