= Murty Classical Library of India =

Set of classic books of Indian literature

- Parent company: Harvard University Press
- Founded: 2010
- Founder: Rohan Narayana Murty
- Official website: murtylibrary.com

The Murty Classical Library of India began publishing classics of Indian literature in January 2015. The books, which are in dual-language format with the original language and English facing, are published by Harvard University Press. The library was established through a $5.2 million gift from Rohan Murty, the son of Infosys co-founder N. R. Narayana Murthy and social worker and author Sudha Murty. The series will include translations from Bengali, Gujarati, Hindi, Kannada, Marathi, Punjabi, Sanskrit, Tamil, Telugu, Urdu, other Indian languages and Persian. It will include fiction, poetry, nonfiction, and religious texts from all Indian traditions including Buddhism and Islam. The projected 500 volumes, to be published over a century, have a corpus of thousands of volumes of classic Indian literature to draw on.

Until 2022, Sheldon Pollock served as the general editor of the library. Pollock had previously edited the Clay Sanskrit Library.

== Inception ==
Sheldon Pollock was searching for a sponsor to continue the work of Clay Sanskrit Library, whose funding had ended in 2008. Rohan Murty, as a PhD student in Computer Science at Harvard University, was taking courses in ancient Indian literature and philosophy from the Sanskrit Department and developed a deep interest in ancient Indian texts. The two were brought together by Gurcharan Das, leading to the establishment of the Murty Classical Library under the auspices of the Harvard University Press.

== Volumes ==
January 2015

- Therigatha: Poems of the First Buddhist Women, translated from Pali by Charles Hallisey, Murty Classical Library of India, Harvard University Press (January 2015), hardcover, 336 pages, ISBN 9780674427730.
- The Story of Manu, by Allasani Peddana, translated from Telugu by Velcheru Narayana Rao and David Shulman, Murty Classical Library of India, Harvard University Press (January 2015), hardcover, 656 pages, ISBN 9780674427761
- Sur's Ocean: Poems from the Early Tradition, Surdas, edited by Kenneth E. Bryant, translated from Hindi by John Stratton Hawley, Murty Classical Library of India, Harvard University Press (January 2015), hardcover, 1072 pages ISBN 9780674427778
- Sufi Lyrics, Bullhe Shah, edited and translated from Panjabi by Christopher Shackle, Murty Classical Library of India, Harvard University Press (January 2015), hardcover, 496 pages, ISBN 9780674427747
- The History of Akbar, Volume 1 (the Akbarnama), by Abu'l-Fazl ibn Mubarak, edited and translated from Persian by Wheeler Thackston, Murty Classical Library of India, Harvard University Press (January 2015), hardcover, 656 pages, ISBN 9780674427754

January 2016

- The History of Akbar, Volume 2 (the Akbarnama), by Abu'l-Fazl ibn Mubarak, edited and translated from Persian by Wheeler Thackston, Murty Classical Library of India, Harvard University Press (January 2016), hardcover, 624 pages, ISBN 9780674504943
- The Epic of Ram, Volume 1, (the Ramcharitmanas) by Tulsidas, translated from Hindi by Philip Lutgendorf, Murty Classical Library of India, Harvard University Press (January 2016), hardcover, 432 pages, ISBN 9780674425019
- The Epic of Ram, Volume 2, (the Ramcharitmanas) by Tulsidas, translated from Hindi by Philip Lutgendorf, Murty Classical Library of India, Harvard University Press (January 2016), hardcover, 560 pages, ISBN 9780674088610
- Arjuna and the Hunter, (the Kirātārjunīya) by Bharavi, edited and translated from Sanskrit by Indira Viswanathan Peterson, Murty Classical Library of India, Harvard University Press (January 2016), hardcover, 480 pages, ISBN 9780674504967 (Note: This is the first complete English translation of Bhāravi's Sanskrit poem. The work was translated into German by Carl Cappeller in 1912 as Volume 15 of the Harvard Oriental Series.)

January 2017

- The History of Akbar, Volume 3 (the Akbarnama), by Abu'l-Fazl ibn Mubarak, edited and translated from Persian by Wheeler Thackston, Murty Classical Library of India, Harvard University Press (January 2017), hardcover, 704 pages, ISBN 9780674659827
- The Killing of Shishupala, (the Shishupala Vadha) by Magha, edited and translated from Sanskrit by Paul Dundas, Murty Classical Library of India, Harvard University Press (January 2017), hardcover, 832 pages, ISBN 9780674660397
- In Praise of Annada, Volume 1, (Annada Mangal) by Bharatchandra Ray, translated from Bengali by France Bhattacharya, Murty Classical Library of India, Harvard University Press (January 2017), hardcover, 560 pages, ISBN 9780674660427
- The Life of Harishchandra, (Harishchandra Kavya) by Raghavanka, translated from Kannada by Vanamala Viswanatha, Murty Classical Library of India, Harvard University Press (January 2017), hardcover, 688 pages, ISBN 9780674545663

January 2018

- The History of Akbar, Volume 4 (the Akbarnama), by Abu'l-Fazl ibn Mubarak, edited and translated from Persian by Wheeler Thackston, Murty Classical Library of India, Harvard University Press (January 2018), hardcover, 656 pages, ISBN 9780674975033
- The Epic of Ram, Volume 3 (the Ramcharitmanas) by Tulsidas, translated from Hindi by Philip Lutgendorf, Murty Classical Library of India, Harvard University Press (January 2018), hardcover, 336 pages, ISBN 9780674975019
- The Epic of Ram, Volume 4 (the Ramcharitmanas) by Tulsidas, translated from Hindi by Philip Lutgendorf, Murty Classical Library of India, Harvard University Press (January 2018), hardcover, 368 pages, ISBN 9780674975026
- The Life of Padma, Volume 1 by Svayambhudeva, translated from Prakrit languages by Eva De Clercq, Murty Classical Library of India, Harvard University Press (January 2018), hardcover, 768 pages, ISBN 9780674660366
- Risalo, by Shah Abdul Latif, edited and translated from Sindhi by Christopher Shackle, Murty Classical Library of India, Harvard University Press (January 2018), hardcover, 704 pages, ISBN 9780674975040

January 2019

- The History of Akbar, Volume 5 (the Akbarnama), by Abu'l-Fazl ibn Mubarak, edited and translated from Persian by Wheeler Thackston, Murty Classical Library of India, Harvard University Press (January 2019), hardcover, 784 pages, ISBN 9780674983953
- A Treatise on Dharma, by Yajnavalkya, edited and translated from Sanskrit by Patrick Olivelle, Murty Classical Library of India, Harvard University Press (January 2019), hardcover, 432 pages, ISBN 9780674277069
- Selected Ghazals and Other Poems, by Mir Taqi Mir, translated from Urdu by Shamsur Rahman Faruqi, Murty Classical Library of India, Harvard University Press (January 2019), hardcover, 704 pages, ISBN 9780674919204
- Remembrances, by Mir Taqi Mir, edited and translated from Persian by C. M. Naim, Murty Classical Library of India, Harvard University Press (January 2019), hardcover, 400 pages, ISBN 9780674660298

January 2020

- The History of Akbar, Volume 6 (the Akbarnama), by Abu'l-Fazl ibn Mubarak, edited and translated from Persian by Wheeler Thackston, Murty Classical Library of India, Harvard University Press (January 2020), hardcover, 688 pages, ISBN 9780674986138
- The Epic of Ram, Volume 5 (the Ramcharitmanas) by Tulsidas, translated from Hindi by Philip Lutgendorf, Murty Classical Library of India, Harvard University Press (January 2020), hardcover, 400 pages, ISBN 9780674986145
- In Praise of Annada, Volume 2 (Annada Mangal) by Bharatchandra Ray, translated from Bengali by France Bhattacharya, Murty Classical Library of India, Harvard University Press (January 2020), hardcover, 720 pages, ISBN 9780674970984

January 2021

- The History of Akbar, Volume 7 (the Akbarnama), by Abu'l-Fazl ibn Mubarak, edited and translated from Persian by Wheeler Thackston, Murty Classical Library of India, Harvard University Press (January 2021), hardcover, 800 pages, ISBN 9780674244160
- Poems from the Satsai (the Satasai), by Biharilal, translated from Hindi by Rupert Snell, Murty Classical Library of India, Harvard University Press (January 2021), hardcover, 192 pages, ISBN 9780674987074
- Lilavai by Kouhala, edited and translated from Prakrit by Andrew Ollett, Murty Classical Library of India, Harvard University Press (January 2021), hardcover, 432 pages, ISBN 9780674247598

February 2022

- The History of Akbar, Volume 8 (the Akbarnama), by Abu'l-Fazl ibn Mubarak, edited and translated from Persian by Wheeler Thackston, Murty Classical Library of India, Harvard University Press (February 2022), hardcover, 672 pages, ISBN 9780674244177
- The Epic of Ram, Volume 6 (the Ramcharitmanas) by Tulsidas, translated from Hindi by Philip Lutgendorf, Murty Classical Library of India, Harvard University Press (February 2022), hardcover, 384 pages, ISBN 9780674258211
- Theft of a Tree (Parijatapaharanamu), by Nandi Timmana, translated from Telugu by Harshita Mruthinti Kamath and Velcheru Narayana Rao, Murty Classical Library of India, Harvard University Press (February 2022), hardcover, 544 pages, ISBN 9780674245891
- Poems from the Guru Granth Sahib, by Guru Nanak, translated from Indic languages by Nikky-Guninder Kaur Singh, Murty Classical Library of India, Harvard University Press (February 2022), hardcover, 624 pages, ISBN 9780674258518

== Formats ==
Paperback versions of the books are available throughout the Indian subcontinent for the equivalent of USD 3 to USD 5, depending on the volume's size. Electronic editions of the works are planned for the future.

== Controversy about General Editor ==
In March 2016, a petition initiated by Indian academicians demanded that Sheldon Pollock be removed from the editorship of the Murty Classical Library of India. The petition cites Rajiv Malhotra's book The Battle for Sanskrit, in which Malhotra criticizes Pollock for his methodologies, which are not being led by a traditional Dharmic point of view, and uses political philology which unearths "social abuses in the texts (against Dalits, Adivasis, women, Muslims, Christians) as the predominant quality of those texts". According to Malhotra, Pollock takes an activist stance, calling "his peers to expunge the Sanskrit tradition of its inbuilt oppressiveness" which he describes as prescriptivism. Malhotra rejects these approaches, regarding them as a bias which threaten traditional approaches of Sanskrit texts. The petition also cites Pollock's signing of statements condemning crackdowns against student protesters at Jawaharlal Nehru University.

In a response, Rohan Murty stated that Sheldon Pollock will continue his position, saying that the library will commission the "best possible scholar for that particular language. We will not judge on nationality, gender, race, creed or colour." He further questioned the intentions of the petitioners, noting that none of the petitioners had tried to contact him for the past six years about any grievances.

In 2022, Professor Parimal G. Patil of Harvard, the chair of MCLI's oversight board, forced Pollock to resign from his position as General Editor two years before his term was up. No replacement was appointed.

== 2024 editorial dismissals ==
In January 2024, Patil, who was still serving as the chair of the MCLI's oversight board, dismissed five of the eight members of the editorial board. The five members dismissed were Whitney Cox of UChicago, Maria Heim of Amherst, Rajeev Kinra of Northwestern, Francesca Orsini of SOAS University of London, and Archana Venkatesan of UC Davis. Patil named two new members of the editorial board, poet and critic Ranjit Hoskote and translator Mini Krishnan.

The five dismissed board members wrote an open letter criticising Patil's "lack of transparency" and characterizing their dismissal as happening "without cause, explanation, or documentation." According to the former board members, Patil had entirely ceased communication with the editorial board for eighteen months prior to their dismissals. They requested the office of Harvard University provost John F. Manning to investigate the matter.

== See also ==
- Columbia University Indo-Iranian Series
- Harvard Oriental Series
- Loeb Classical Library
- National Library of India
