= N. R. Narayana Murthy =

Indian businessman (born 1946)

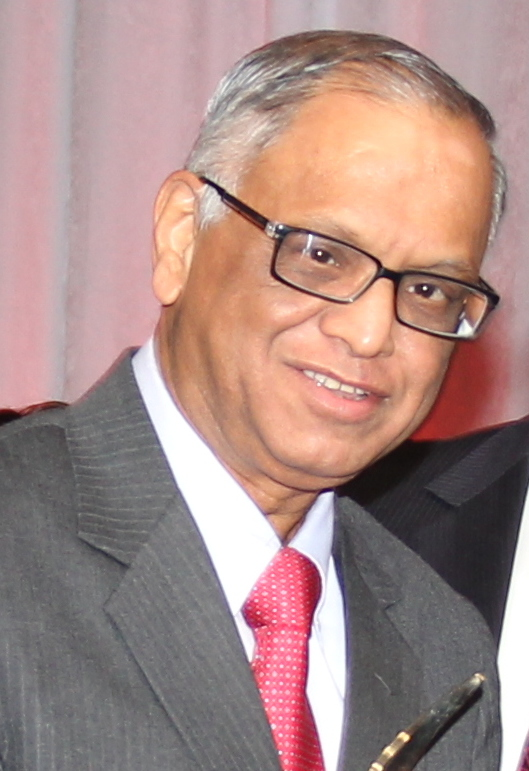
- Murthy in 2014
- Born: Nagavara Ramarao Narayana Murthy; 20 August 1946 (age 80); Sidlaghatta, Kingdom of Mysore, British India (present-day Karnataka, India)
- Education: National Institute of Engineering, Mysuru (BE); IIT Kanpur (MTech)
- Known for: Founder and Chairman Emeritus of Infosys
- Board member of: United Nations Foundation; Ford Foundation
- Spouse: Sudha Murty (m. 1978)
- Children: Akshata Murty; Rohan Murty
- Relatives: Rishi Sunak (son-in-law); Shrinivas Kulkarni (brother-in-law); Gururaj Deshpande (brother-in-law)
- Awards: Padma Shri (2000); Honorary Commander of the Order of the British Empire (2007); Legion of Honour (2008); Padma Vibhushan (2008)

Nagavara Ramarao Narayana Murthy (born 20 August 1946) is an Indian billionaire businessman. He is one of the founders of Infosys, and was the chairman, chief executive officer (CEO), president and chief mentor of the company before retiring and becoming chairman emeritus. As of January 2025, his net worth was estimated at US$5.0 billion, according to Forbes.

Murthy was born and raised in Sidlaghatta, Karnataka. He first worked at the Indian Institute of Management Ahmedabad, as chief systems programmer, and Patni Computer Systems in Pune, Maharashtra. He founded Infosys in 1981 and was the CEO from 1981 to 2002, as well as the chairman from 2002 to 2011. In 2011, he stepped down from the board and became the chairman emeritus. In June 2013, Murthy was appointed as the executive chairman for a period of five years.

Murthy has been listed among the 12 greatest entrepreneurs of our time by Fortune magazine. He has been described as the "father of the Indian IT sector" by Time magazine and CNBC for his contribution to outsourcing in India. In 2005, he co-chaired the World Economic Forum in Davos, Switzerland. Murthy has been honoured with the Padma Vibhushan and Padma Shri awards.

Murthy is the father-in-law of Rishi Sunak, former Prime Minister of the United Kingdom from 2022 to 2024.

== Early life and education ==
N. R. Narayana Murthy was born on 20 August 1946 in Sidlaghatta, a city in India's south-western state of Karnataka into a Kannada speaking middle-class Deshastha Madhva Brahmin family. After completing his school education, he went to the National Institute of Engineering and graduated in 1967 with a bachelor's degree in electrical engineering. In 1969 he received his master's degree from the Indian Institute of Technology Kanpur.

In 2007, Murthy received an honorary degree from Lancaster University.

== Career ==
Murthy first worked as a research associate under a faculty at IIM Ahmedabad and then later as the chief systems programmer. There he worked on India's first time-sharing computer system and designed and implemented a BASIC interpreter for Electronics Corporation of India Limited. He started a company named Softronics. When that company failed after about a year and a half, he joined Patni Computer Systems in Pune.

Murthy mentions that being arrested and expelled for no good reason during the communist era 1974 in a border town near the Yugoslav-Bulgarian border, turned him into a "compassionate capitalist" from a "confused leftist/communist". In 1981 he, with six software professionals, founded Infosys with an initial capital investment of Rs 10,000, which was provided by his wife Sudha Murty. Murthy was the CEO of Infosys for 21 years from 1981 to 2002 and was succeeded by co-founder Nandan Nilekani. At Infosys he articulated, designed and implemented a global delivery model for IT services outsourcing from India. He was the chairman of the board from 2002 to 2006, after which he also became the chief mentor. In August 2011, he retired from the company, taking the title chairman emeritus.

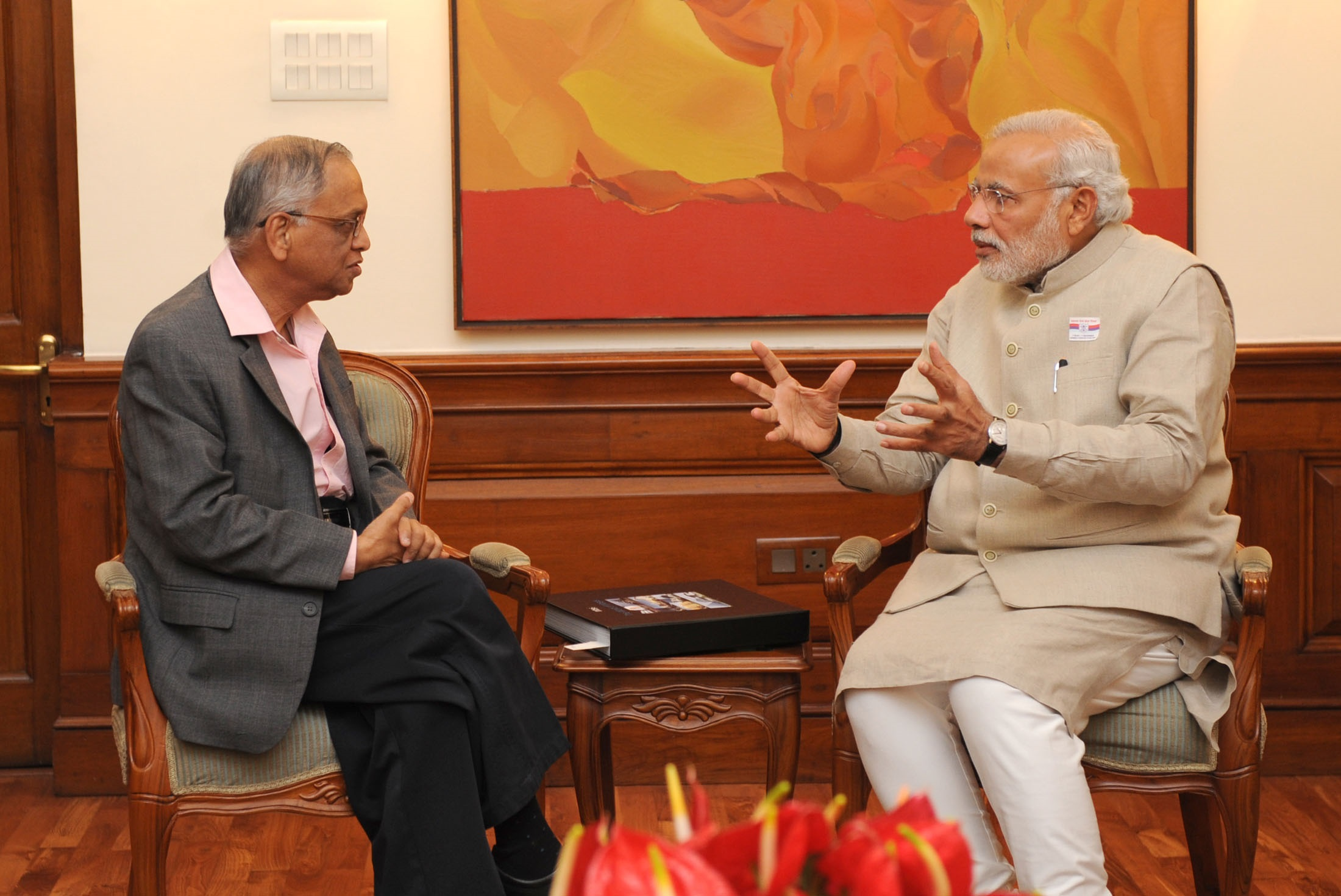
Murthy with Narendra Modi in 2014

Murthy is an independent director on the corporate board of HSBC and has been a director on the boards of DBS Bank, Unilever, ICICI and NDTV. He is also a member of the advisory boards and councils of several educational and philanthropic institutions, including Cornell University, INSEAD, ESSEC, Ford Foundation, the UN Foundation, the Indo-British Partnership, Asian Institute of Management, a trustee of the Infosys Prize, a trustee of the Institute for Advanced Study in Princeton, and as a trustee of the Rhodes Trust. He is also the Chairman of the Governing board of Public Health Foundation of India. He is on the Asia Pacific advisory board of British Telecommunications.

In June 2013, Murthy returned to Infosys as executive chairman and a director. In June 2014, he stood down as executive chairman, was non-executive chairman until October, when he became chairman emeritus.

Murthy is also on the strategic board which advises the national law firm, Cyril Amarchand Mangaldas, on strategic, policy and governance issues. He is a member of IESE's International Advisory Board (IAB).

In 2010, Murthy has made an investment in SKS Microfinance along with venture capitalist Vinod Khosla.

In 2016, Murthy participated in FXC as a Board Member.

In 2017, Murthy raised concerns over alleged corporate governance lapses at Infosys, however the company went on to deny these claims.

== Views on working hours ==
In late 2023, a comment by Murthy suggesting that young people should work 70 hours a week to boost national productivity sparked a widespread public debate in India. He rejected the notion of work–life balance and refused to retract his statement. In November 2024, he clarified that the remark was meant to be a matter of introspection and not debate. He stated that while he worked more than 12 hours a day for over 40 years, it was a personal choice, adding that such long hours should not be mandated. A year later, he advocated for the 996 working hour system (9:00am to 9:00pm, six days a week) in India, alleging this helps contribute to China's rapid growth. These comments received widespread backlash given the detrimental effects on physical and mental health the 996 system is known to have, the fact that it was outlawed by the Chinese Supreme Court in 2021, and such overwork does not provide compensation.

== Personal life ==
Murthy's wife Sudha is an educator, author, and philanthropist who has served as the chairperson of the non-profit Infosys Foundation. They have two children together: a son, Rohan, and a daughter, Akshata. From June 2013 to June 2014, Rohan Murthy joined Infosys as an executive assistant to his father. He left Infosys to create his own company called Soroco in 2014. In 2009, Akshata married British-Indian Conservative politician Rishi Sunak, who served as Prime Minister of the United Kingdom from 2022 to 2024.

== Awards and honours ==
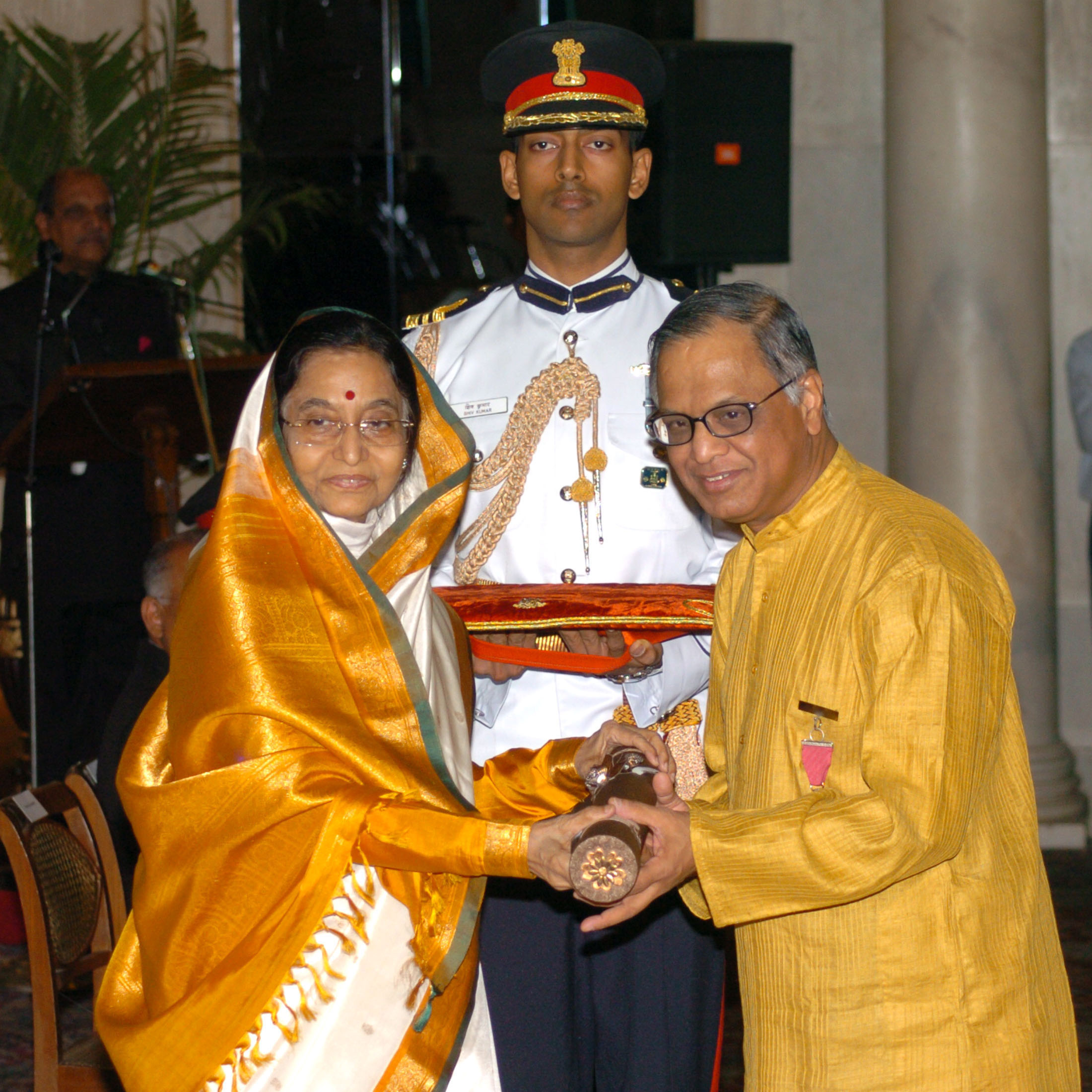
President Pratibha Patil presenting the Padma Vibhushan to N. R. Narayana Murthy, at Rashtrapati Bhavan, in 2008

Year	Name	Awarding organization	Ref.
2000	Padma Shri	Government of India	
2002	IET Honorary Fellow	Institution of Engineering and Technology	
2003	Ernst & Young World Entrepreneur Of The Year	Ernst & Young World Entrepreneur of the Year Jury	
2007	IEEE Ernst Weber Engineering Leadership Recognition	Institute of Electrical and Electronics Engineers	
2007	Honorary Commander of the Order of the British Empire (CBE)	Government of United Kingdom	
2007	Honorary Degree	Lancaster University	
2008	Officer of the Legion of Honour	Government of France	
2008	Padma Vibhushan	Government of India	
2009	Woodrow Wilson Award for Corporate Citizenship	Woodrow Wilson International Center for Scholars	
2009	Doctorate of Science (Honoris Causa)	Shri Mata Vaishno Devi University	
2010	IEEE Honorary Membership	Institute of Electrical and Electronics Engineers.	
2011	NDTV Indian of the Year's Icon of India	NDTV	
2012	Hoover Medal	American Society of Mechanical Engineers	
2013	Philanthropist of the Year	The Asian Awards	
2013	Sayaji Ratna Award	Baroda Management Association, Vadodara	
2013	25 Greatest Global Indian Living Legends	NDTV	
2014	CIF Global Indian Award	Canada India Foundation	
2018	Asian Scientist 100	Asian Scientist	
2019	Asian Scientist 100	Asian Scientist	
2022	Kempegowda Award	Bruhat Bengaluru Mahanagara Palike (BBMP)	
2024	India Lifetime Achievement Award as a part of the 2024 Patrick J. McGovern Awards	Chiratae Ventures	

== Bibliography ==
- Narayana Murthy, N. R. (2009). A better India, a better world. New Delhi, India: Penguin Books India : Allen Lane. ISBN 978-0-670-08283-4.
- Murthy, Narayana (2016). The Wit and Wisdom of Narayana Murthy. Erscheinungsort nicht ermittelbar: Hay House. ISBN 978-93-85827-02-0.
- Murthy, N. r Narayana (2010). A Clear Blue Sky: Stories and Poems on Conflict and Hope. Puffin Books. ISBN 978-0-14-333141-4.
