= Political philology =

Political philology is "an active mode of understanding" texts. It does not simply take (religious) texts at face-value as religious texts without any connection to a social and political context, but situates them in a historical context, and is sensitive to the social and political implications and usages of a (religious) text.

== See also ==
- Hermeneutics of suspicion
- Sheldon Pollock
- The Battle for Sanskrit

== Sources ==
- Malhotra, Rajiv (2016), The Battle For Sanskrit. Is Sanskrit political or sacred, oppressive or liberating, dead or alive?, HarperCollins India, ISBN 9789351775393
- Pollock, Sheldon (July 26, 2008), "Towards a Political Philology: D.D. Kosambi and Sanskrit" (PDF), Economic & Political Weekly
