= Someshwara Temple, Lakshmeshwara =

Coordinates: 15°07′34″N 75°28′24″E

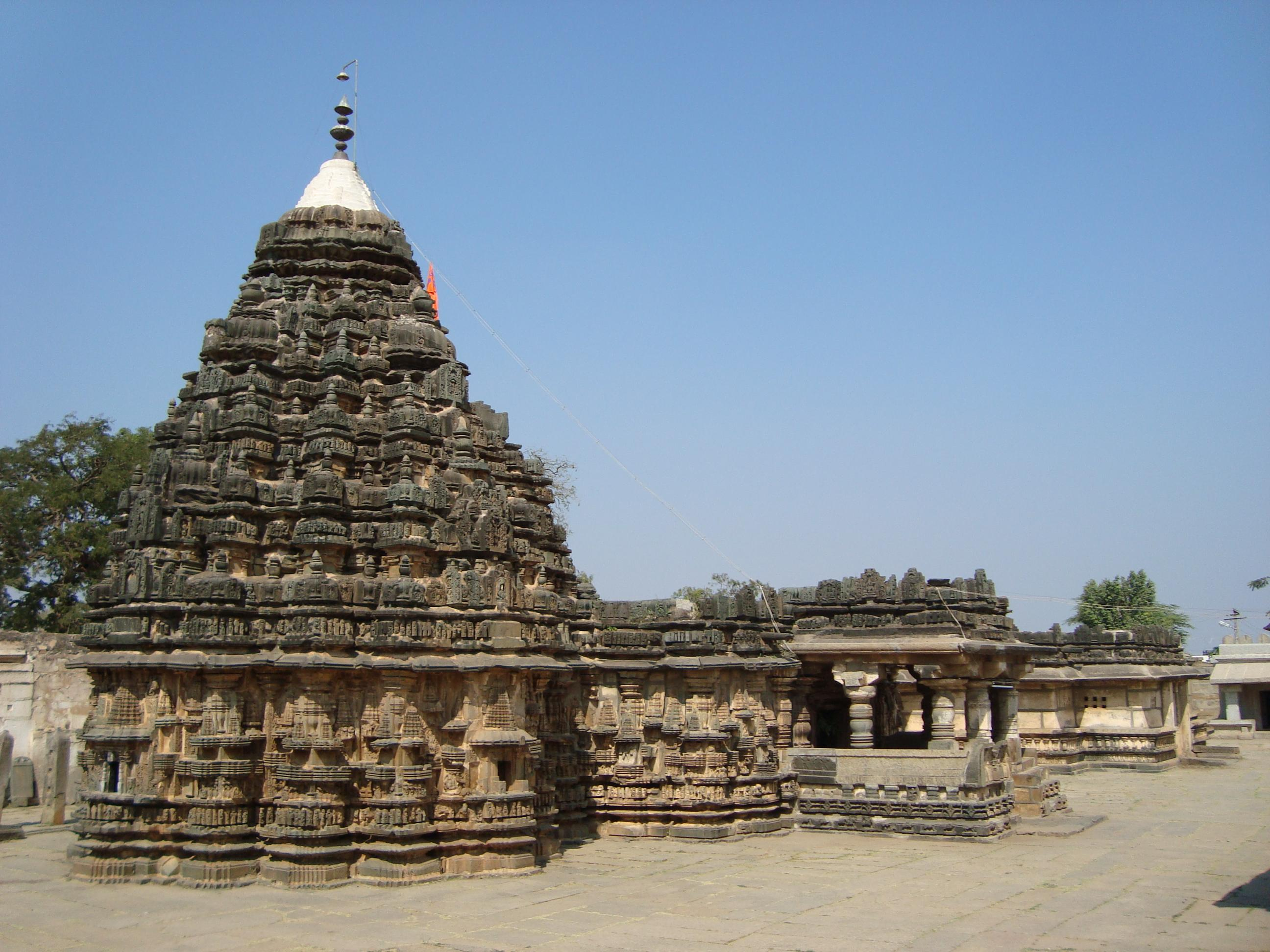

Religion
- Affiliation: Hinduism
- Deity: Shiva

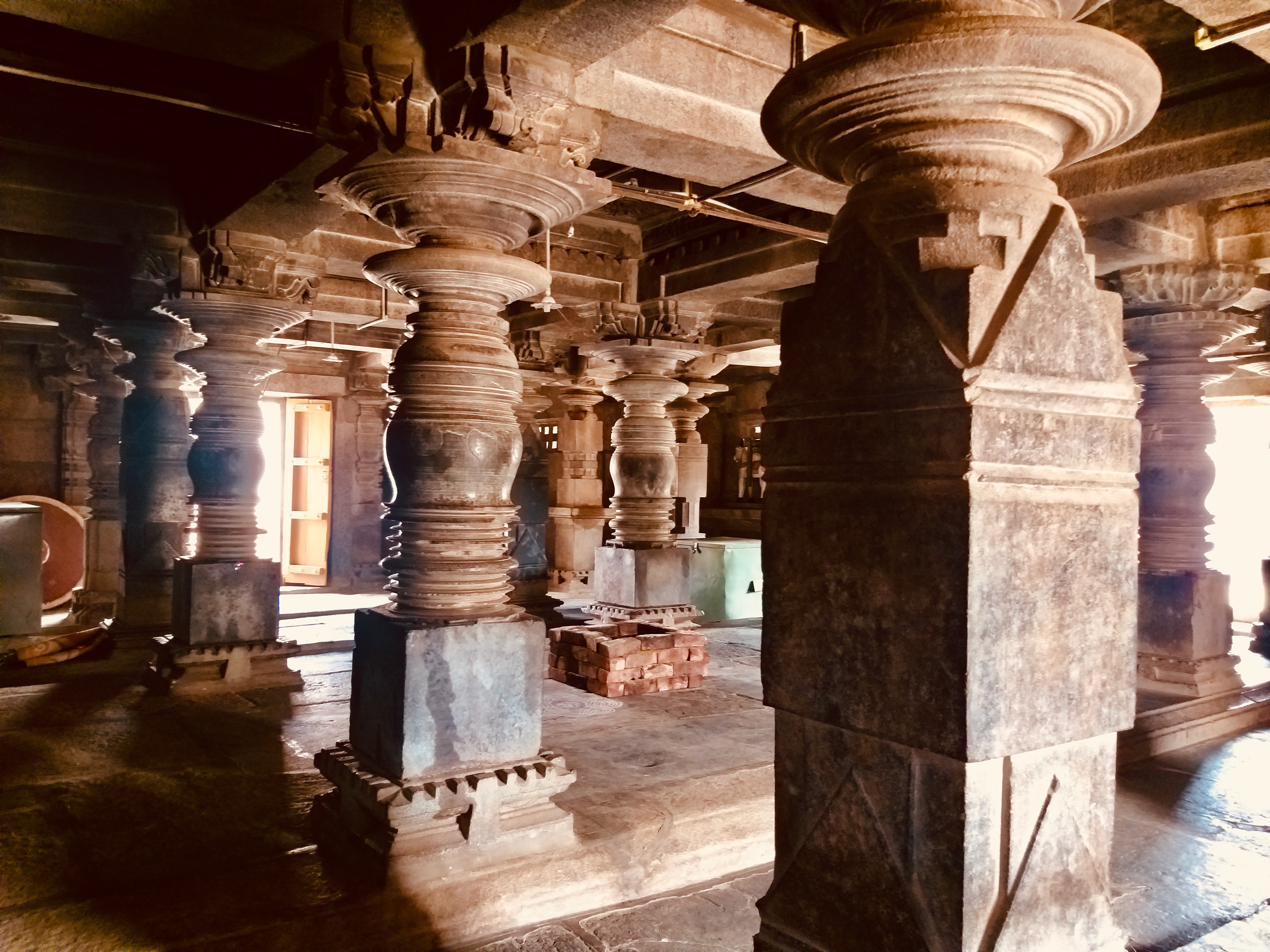
Interior

Someshwara Temple, Lakshmeshwara is a temple in Lakshmeshwara. It was restored between 2012 and 2015, with the restoration supervised by the Archaeological Survey of India and funded by the Infosys foundation.

Historical records suggest that this was originally a Jain temple.

== History ==
The temple was built by the Kalyani Chalukyas.

== Description ==
The deity worshipped is Shiva, sitting atop Nandi.
