= Sheldon Pollock =

American Sanskrit scholar (1948)

Sheldon I. Pollock
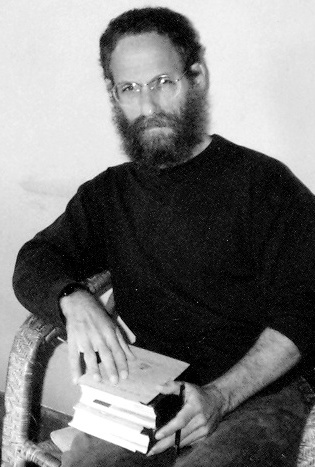
- Born: 1948 (age 77–78); United States
- Occupations: Chair, South Asian Studies, Columbia University
- Awards: Padma Shri

Academic background
- Education: Harvard University
- Thesis: Aspects of Versification in Sanskrit Lyric Poetry (1970)
- Doctoral advisor: Daniel H. H. Ingalls Sr.

Academic work
- Discipline: Sanskrit, Philology, intellectual history
- Website: sheldonpollock.org

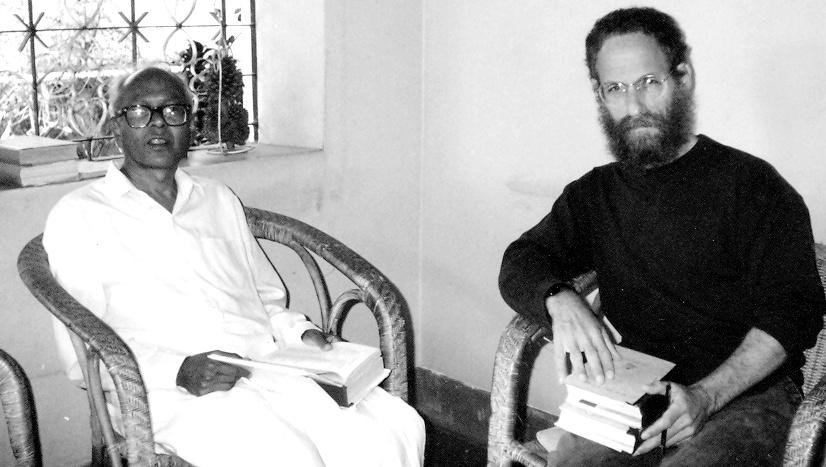
Pollock (at right) with Venkatachala Sastry

Sheldon I. Pollock (born 1948) is an American scholar of Sanskrit, the intellectual and literary history of India, and comparative intellectual history. He is the Arvind Raghunathan Professor of South Asian Studies at Columbia University. He was the general editor of the Clay Sanskrit Library and the founding editor of the Murty Classical Library of India.

== Education ==
Sheldon Pollock was educated at Harvard University. He completed an undergraduate degree in Greek Classics magna cum laude in 1971 and then a Masters in 1973. This was followed by a Ph.D. in 1975 in Sanskrit and Indian Studies.

== Occupations ==
Before his current position at Columbia University, Pollock was a professor at the University of Iowa and the George V. Bobrinskoy Professor of Sanskrit and Indic Studies at the University of Chicago.

He directed the project Sanskrit Knowledge Systems on the Eve of Colonialism, in which a number of non-Indian scholars (including Pollock, Yigal Bronner, Lawrence McCrea, Christopher Minkowski, Karin Preisendanz, and Dominik Wujastyk) examine the state of knowledge produced in Sanskrit before colonialism. He is also editing a series of Historical Sourcebooks in Classical Indian Thought, to which he has contributed A Rasa Reader: Classical Indian Aesthetics.

He was general editor of the Clay Sanskrit Library and is founding editor of the Murty Classical Library of India. He also served on the Humanities Jury for the Infosys Prize in 2012.

== Scholarship ==
Pollock's research focuses on the history and interpretation of Sanskrit texts. He completed his dissertation, "Aspects of Versification in Sanskrit Lyric Poetry", at Harvard University under Daniel H. H. Ingalls. Much of his work, including his 2006 book The Language of the Gods in the World of Men, discusses the different roles that Sanskrit has played in intellectual and cultural life throughout its history.

=== Deep Orientalism? (1993) ===
According to Pollock's Deep Orientalism? (1993), European indologists and the British colonialists merely propagated the pre-existing oppressive structures inherent in Sanskrit such as varna. Pollock labels the Varnas not as cognates for the European social categories known as Estates, but as pre-existing oppressive structures, which he finds revealed in Sanskrit text as "pre-orientalist orientalism", "pre-colonial orientalism" and "a preform of orientalism".

According to Pollock, "Sanskrit was the principal discursive instrument of domination in premodern India." According to Wilhelm Halbfass, Pollock postulates an inherent relationship between the hegemonic role of Sanskrit in traditional India and its students among British colonialists or German National Socialists. (Note: Wilhelm Halbfass: [Pollock] "postulates an inherent affinity between the hegemonic role of Sanskrit in traditional India (as propagated by the Mīmāṃsakas and others) and the attitudes of its latter-day students among British colonialists or German National Socialists".)

Pollock believes that the previous "Eurocentrism" and "European epistemological hegemony" prevented scholars "from probing central features of South Asian life". According to Pollock, "One task of post-orientalist Indology has to be to exhume, isolate, analyze, theorize, and at the very least talk about the different modalities of domination in traditional India."

=== Rāmāyaṇa ===
Pollock was part of the "Rāmāyaṇa Translation Consortion" led by Robert Goldman, which produced an annotated translation of the critical edition of the entire Rāmāyaṇa, published by Princeton University Press. Pollock contributed translations of the Ayodhyākāṇḍa (1986) and the Araṇyakāṇḍa (1991), as well as a note on the critical edition of the Rāmāyaṇa published in the first volume of the Princeton translation and several articles on the textual criticism and interpretation of the poem. These studies include The Divine King in the Indian Epic, which examines the divinity of Rāma in the Vālmīki Rāmāyaṇa and its political implications.

In Ramayana and Political Imagination in India (1993), written against the backdrop of the demolition of the Babri Masjid and attendant sectarian violence in Ayodhya, Pollock seeks to explain how the Ramayana, a text commonly viewed as a "narrative of the divine presence" in the world could serve as a basis for a divisive contemporary political discourse. He asserts that there is a long history of relationship between the Ramayana and political symbology, with the protagonist, Rama depicted as the "chief of the righteous", and Ravana, in opposition, as the one "who fills all the world with terror". Pollock calls the Ramayana fundamentally a text of "othering" as outsiders in the epic are "othered" by being represented as sexual, dietetical, and political deviants. Ravana, is not only "other" due to his polygyny but is presented as a tyrant. Similarly, he states that the rakshasas (demons) of the poem can be viewed from a psychosexual perspective to symbolise all that the traditional Sanskritic Indian might desire and fear. He contrasts the othering in the Ramayana with the Mahabharata which not only has no othering, but in fact has "brothering" due to the shared identity of the antagonists.

A "dramatic and unparalleled" turn came about in the eleventh to fourteenth centuries, a time when the Muslim Turkic rule took hold in India, with Ramayana taking a central place in the public political discourse. He notes the specific meaning-conjuncture in the depiction of the Gurjara-Pratihara founder Nagabhata I as the sage Narayana that "shone with four arms with glittering terrible weapons". To Pollock, Ramayana offers "special imaginative resources", of divinization and demonization. Valmiki's solution to the political paradox of epic India is the "divinized king" who combats evil in the form of a 'demonized others'. Later medieval commentaries of Valmiki's Ramayana include instances where the Muslim outsiders are cast as rakshasas and asuras, and in the case of a Mughal translation of the epic, of Akbar being projected as the divine king, Rama and divs as the rakshasas. Pollock conjectures that this recurrent "mythopolitical strategy" of using the Ramayana as a political instrument has also found favour in modern India in the Ayodhya dispute. This, he posits, is clear not only in the choice of Ayodhya, the traditional birthplace of Rama, but also in the attempts by the BJP and VHP to portray Muslims as demonic.

=== The Death of Sanskrit (2001) and Rajiv Malhotra ===
Pollock begins his 2001 paper The Death of Sanskrit by associating Sanskrit with Hindutva (Hindu identity politics), the Bharatiya Janata Party, and the Vishva Hindu Parishad.

Pollock writes, "in some crucial way, Sanskrit is dead", and postulates how Sanskrit might have reached such an impasse. Observing changes in the use of Sanskrit in 12th-century Kashmir, 16th-century Vijayanagara, and 17th-century Varanasi, Pollock argued that Sanskrit came to serve the purposes of "reinscription and restatement", while truly creative energies were directed elsewhere. He added that "what destroyed Sanskrit literary culture was a set of much longer-term cultural, social, and political changes".

According to Indian-American author Rajiv Malhotra, Pollock devised a novel idea about the literarization of Sanskrit, wherein the language "gets endowed with certain structures that make it an elite language of power over the masses". Moreover, in his book The Battle for Sanskrit, Malhotra suggests that Pollock makes deliberate, Hinduphobic and Indophobic attempts to de-sanctify Sanskrit.

=== The Language of the Gods in the World of Men (2006) ===
==== The Sanskrit Cosmopolis ====
In his 2006 book The Language of the Gods in the World of Men, Pollock posits "the scholarly cultivation of language in premodern India" should be seen in terms of "its relationship to political power". Although Sanskrit was a language of Vedic ritual, it was adopted by royal courts, and by the fifth century "power in India now had a Sanskrit voice". According to Pollock, "Sanskrit become the premier vehicle for the expression of royal will, displacing all other codes" and "Sanskrit learning itself became an essential component of power." Pollock believes that grammar was linked to power, stating "the main point should be clear: that power's concern with grammar, and to a comparable degree grammar's concern with power, comprised a constitutive feature of the Sanskrit cosmopolitan order." Pollock states, "overlords were keen to ensure the cultivation of the language through patronage awarded to grammarians, lexicographers, metricians, and other custodians of purity, and through endowments to schools for the purpose of grammatical studies." Pollock links the varna of Sanskrit grammar (which means language sounds) to the varna of social order.

==== The vernacular millennium ====
Pollock has argued that, in the Sanskrit cosmopolis, vernacular languages were largely excluded from doing the kind of political-cultural "work" that Sanskrit did. Gradually, however, a process of "vernacularization" resulted in certain vernacular languages being cultivated in much the same way as Sanskrit. Pollock has argued that "vernacularization" has generally involved two steps: first, the use of a written form of the vernacular in "everyday" contexts, such as recording names in inscriptions, which Pollock calls "literalization", and second, the use of the written form of the vernacular in more imaginative contexts, such as writing poetry, which Pollock calls "literarization". Literarization has often involved the creative adaptation of models from "superposed cultural formations", and in South Asia this has largely meant using Sanskrit models. Pollock has focused on Kannada as a case study in vernacularization in South Asia, and has reflected on the vernacularization of Europe as a parallel instance.

==== Lack of a singular Indian culture ====
Pollock believes there never was a singular Indian culture and critiques the idea of unitary civilizations as a whole. Pollock states:

And by the same token, it is erroneous to think of a civilization, or a "great tradition," as a unitary entity of whatever size. Indeed, a stable singularity called "Indian culture", so often conjured up by Southeast Asian indigenists, never existed. What did exist was only a range of cultural and political codes and acts, many recently developed (Sanskrit kāvya, public inscriptions, free-standing temple buildings, quasi-universalist political imagery, land-grants to Brahmanical communities, and so on) and undoubtedly generated out of various local practices. Only gradually did all these practices coalesce into something like a cosmopolitan unity, one that was both "at home" and "abroad" across this entire space.

Pollock believes the idea of "a single Indian 'peoplehood' (janata)" present in the name of the Bharatiya Janata Party is a modern invention:

The very names of the groups that make up the institutional complex of Hindutva – including the Bharatiya Janata Party (Indian People's Party) and its ideological wing, the Vishwa Hindu Parishad (World Hindu Council) – bespeak what had never been spoken before, postulating in the one case a single Indian "peoplehood" (janata), in the other, Hinduism as an aggressive universalism.

=== Critical philology to transcend Sanskrit's "toxicity" ===
Pollock has written about the history and current state of philology, both inside India and outside. In Indian Philology and India's Philology (2011) he defines this current state as "the practices of making sense of texts". In Future Philology? (2009) he has called for practising a "critical philology" which is sensitive to different kinds of truths: the facts of a text's production and circulation, and the various ways in which texts have been interpreted throughout history. In Crisis in the Classics (2011) Pollock states that, once the "toxicity", "extraordinary inequality" and "social poisons" of Sanskrit are acknowledged, critical philology can be used to transcend inequality and transform the dominant culture by "outsmarting" the oppressive discourse through study and analysis. (Note: Pollock: "We may unhesitatingly grant the premise that classical culture, Sanskrit for example, offers at one and the same time a record of civilization and a record of barbarism, of extraordinary inequality and other social poisons. Once we all agree on the toxicity of this discourse, however, there will be contestation over how to overcome it. In my view, you do not transcend inequality, to the degree it is a conceptual category taking some of its force from traditional discourse, by outlawing the authors and burning the discourses, or indeed by trying to forget them; you transcend inequality by mastering and overmastering those discourses through study and critique. You cannot simply go around a tradition to overcome it, if that is what you wish to do; you must go through it. You only transform a dominant culture by outsmarting it. That, I believe, is precisely what some of India's most disruptive thinkers, such as Dr. Ambedkar, sought to do, though they were not as successful as they might have been had they had access to all the tools of a critical philology necessary to the task.)

In the introduction to World Philology (2015) he has also drawn attention to the diversity and longevity of philological traditions in the world and argued for studying them comparatively.

=== Aesthetics ===
Pollock has published on issues related to the history of aesthetics in India, and in particular on the paradigm shift from a "formalist" analysis of emotion (rasa) in literary texts to a more "reader-centered" analysis in the (lost) works of the 9th/10th-century theorist Bhaṭṭa Nāyaka.

=== Ambedkar Sanskrit Fellowship Program ===
In 2011 the Ambedkar Sanskrit Fellowship Program started at Columbia, offering a fellowship for one person to pursue a master's degree in Sanskrit. Pollock hopes that this eventually will result in a PhD. Pollock believes that "learning Sanskrit will empower the oppressed by helping them understand the sources and building blocks of the ideology of oppression, as well as its arbitrary nature."

== Reception ==
=== Hegemonic role of Sanskrit ===
According to Jessica Frazier, Pollock points "an accusatory finger at the language, highlighting its function as a purveyor of forms of authority that are culturally and ethnically exclusive, benefiting the few at the expense of the many". According to Frazier, Pollock shows how texts can function to support and spread forms of authority which exclude specific cultural and ethnic subgroups, thereby benefiting small groups within society, at the expense of other groups.

According to Frazier, Pollock has been "contributing to the hermeneutics of suspicion that has become influential in Hindu Studies". "Hermeneutics of suspicion" is a phrase coined by Paul Ricœur, "to capture a common spirit that pervades the writings of Marx, Freud, and Nietzsche". According to Rita Felski, it is "a distinctively modern style of interpretation that circumvents obvious or self-evident meanings in order to draw out less visible and less flattering truths. (Note: Rita Felski: "The 'hermeneutics of suspicion' is a phrase coined by Paul Ricoeur to capture a common spirit that pervades the writings of Marx, Freud, and Nietzsche. In spite of their obvious differences, he argued, these thinkers jointly constitute a 'school of suspicion'. That is to say, they share a commitment to unmasking 'the lies and illusions of consciousness'; they are the architects of a distinctively modern style of interpretation that circumvents obvious or self-evident meanings in order to draw out less visible and less flattering truths (Ricoeur 356). Ricoeur's term has sustained an energetic after-life within religious studies, as well as in philosophy, intellectual history, and related fields[.]") Ruthellen Josselson explains that "Ricoeur distinguishes between two forms of hermeneutics: a hermeneutics of faith which aims to restore meaning to a text and a hermeneutics of suspicion which attempts to decode meanings that are disguised."

According to David Peter Lawrence, Pollock characterizes Shastras, including philosophical works, as efforts to eternally enshrine the interests and cultural practices of sections of pre-modern India.

=== The death of Sanskrit ===
Scholars have reacted to Pollock's claim that Sanskrit is dead. Jürgen Hanneder states that Pollock's argumentation is "often arbitrary". Hanneder states "Pollock has overinterpreted the evidence to support his theory, perhaps in his understandable anger over current nationalistic statements about Sanskrit and indeed new attempts at resanskritization – processes that should perhaps be analysed a few decades later from a distance." Hanneder says that Sanskrit is not a "dead language in the most common usage of the term", since it is still "spoken, written and read", and has emphasized the continuous production of creative literature in Sanskrit up to the present day. Others, including Pollock himself, have emphasized the new creative and intellectual projects that Sanskrit was a part of in early modernity, such as Nīlakaṇṭha Caturdhara's commentary on the Mahābhārata and the development of sophisticated forms of logical analysis (navyanyāya).

=== National Socialist Indology ===
Reinhold Grünendahl takes a critical stance towards Pollock's characterisation of German pre-war Indology as "a state-funded Aryanist think-tank, set up to create an Indo-German 'counter-identity to Semite', and simultaneously preparing the 'scientific' basis for racial antisemitism". According to Grünendahl, Pollock's new American school of Indology is "post-Orientalist messianism", commenting that Pollock's self-described "Indology beyond the Raj and Auschwitz" leads to "the 'New Raj' across the deep blue sea".

=== Petition to remove Pollock from Murty Classical Library ===
A petition initiated by Indian scholars demanded that Pollock be removed from the editorship of the Murty Classical Library of India, an initiative that publishes classical literary works from India. The petitioners are believed to belong to the "network of trust" created by Rajiv Malhotra's book, The Battle for Sanskrit, and criticized Pollock's political philology perspective on Sanskrit as well as Pollock's signing of statements condemning crackdowns against student protesters at Jawaharlal Nehru University.

In a review with the Indian Express, Sheldon Pollock said that negative reception of his work from Hindu activists started because of the JNU student agitation protest petition that he signed. He also clarified that he is a scholar and does not do religious things, saying "I never write on Hinduism. I've never used the word Hinduism." Additionally, he acknowledged that with regards to his essay on The Ramayana, he was to some degree insensitive to the fact that the Ramayana has a life in the hearts of the Indian people, and he is still trying to learn. However, he also said "I write what I think is correct and deal with the consequences. It's difficult to debate with people whose behavior is marked with toxicity, vituperation, deceit, and libel", in reference to the organized campaign to remove him from general editorship of the Murty Classical Library of India.

Rohan Murty, the founder of the library, stated that Sheldon Pollock will continue his position, saying that the library will commission the best possible scholar for that particular language. However, in 2022, Professor Parimal G. Patil of Harvard, the chair of MCLI's oversight board, forced Pollock to resign from his position as General Editor two years before his term was up. No replacement was appointed.

== Selected publications ==
His publications cluster around the Rāmāyaṇa, the philosophical tradition of Mīmāṃsā (scriptural hermeneutics), and recently, the theory of rasa (aesthetic emotion). Pollock directed the Literary Cultures in History project, which culminated in a book of the same title.

=== Monographs ===
- The Language of the Gods in the World of Men: Sanskrit, Culture and Power in Premodern India. Berkeley: University of California Press, 2006.
- Aspects of Versification in Sanskrit Lyric Poetry. New Haven: American Oriental Society, 1977.

=== Edited volumes ===
- World Philology (with B. A. Elman and K. Chang). Cambridge, Mass.: Harvard University Press, 2015.
- Forms of Knowledge in Early Modern Asia: Explorations in the Intellectual History of India and Tibet, 1500–1800. Durham: Duke University Press, 2011.
- Bhānudatta, "Bouquet of Rasa" and "River of Rasa". Translated & co-edited by Pollock, with I. Onians. New York: NYU Press, JJC Foundation, 2009.
- Literary Cultures in History: Reconstructions from South Asia. Berkeley: University of California Press, 2003.

=== Translations ===
- Rama's Last Act (Uttararāmacarita) of Bhavabhūti. New York: New York University Press, 2007. (Clay Sanskrit Library.)
- The Bouquet of Rasa and the River of Rasa (Rasamañjarī and Rasataraṅgiṇī) of Bhānudatta. New York: New York University Press, 2009. (Clay Sanskrit Library)
- The Rāmāyaṇa of Vālmīki, An Epic of Ancient India, Vol. III: Araṇyakāṇḍa. Princeton: Princeton University Press, 1991.
- The Rāmāyaṇa of Vālmīki, An Epic of Ancient India, Vol. II: Ayodhyākāṇḍa. Princeton: Princeton University Press, 1986.
- A Rasa Reader: Classical Indian Aesthetics, Historical Sourcebooks in Classical Indian Thought series, Columbia University Press, 2016

=== Articles and book chapters ===
- 'From Rasa Seen to Rasa Heard.' In Caterina Guenzi and Sylvia d'Intino, eds. Aux abords de la clairière. Paris: Brepols, 2012, pp. 189–207.
- 'Review Article: Indian Philology and India's Philology.' Journal Asiatique volume 299, number 1 (2011), pp. 423–475.
- 'Comparison without Hegemony.' In Barbro Klein and Hans Joas, eds. The Benefit of Broad Horizons: Intellectual and Institutional Preconditions for a Global Social Science. Festschrift for Bjorn Wittrock on the Occasion of his 65th Birthday. Leiden: Brill, 2010, pp. 185–204.
- 'What was Bhaṭṭa Nāyaka Saying? The Hermeneutical Transformation of Indian Aesthetics.' In Sheldon Pollock, ed. Epic and Argument in Sanskrit Literary History: Essays in Honor of Robert P. Goldman. Delhi: Manohar, 2010, pp. 143–184.
- 'Future Philology? The Fate of a Soft Science in a Hard World.' In James Chandler and Arnold Davidson, eds. The Fate of the Disciplines. Special number of Critical Inquiry volume 35, number 4 (Summer 2009): 931–961.
- —— (27 November 2008). "The Real Classical Languages Debate". The Hindu.
- —— (26 July 2008). "Towards a Political Philology: D. D. Kosambi and Sanskrit" (PDF). Economic and Political Weekly. 43 (30): 52–59.
- —— (April 2001). "The Death of Sanskrit" (PDF). Comparative Studies in Society and History. 43 (2): 392–426. doi:10.1017/S001041750100353X. S2CID 35550166.
- —— (1993). "Deep Orientalism? Notes on Sanskrit and Power Beyond the Raj". In Breckenridge, Carol A.; van der Veer, Peter (eds.). Orientalism and the Postcolonial Predicament. Philadelphia: University of Pennsylvania Press. ISBN 978-0-8122-1436-9.
- —— (1993). "Ramayana and Political Imagination in India". The Journal of Asian Studies. 52 (2): 261–297. doi:10.2307/2059648. JSTOR 2059648. S2CID 154215656.

== Awards ==
- Graduate Prize Fellowship, Harvard University (1971–75).
- Senior Fellowship, National Endowment for the Humanities / American Institute of Indian Studies (1994–95).
- National Endowment for the Humanities Collaborative Research Grants (1995–2004).
- Faculty Award for Excellence in Graduate Teaching, University of Chicago (2001).
- American Council of Learned Societies Senior Fellowship (2001–2002)
- National Science Foundation Collaborative Research Grant (2002–2004)
- Professional and Scholarly Publishing Division Award for Excellence in Literature, Language, and Linguistics, Association of American Publishers (2006), for The Language of the Gods in the World of Men.
- Trilling Book Award, Columbia University (2007), for The Language of the Gods in the World of Men.
- Ananda Kentish Coomaraswamy Book Prize, Association for Asian Studies (2008), for The Language of the Gods in the World of Men.
- Andrew W. Mellon Foundation Distinguished Achievement Award (2008)
- Presidential Certificate of Honour for Sanskrit, Government of India (2009)
- Padma Shri, Government of India (2010)
- Friend of India” award, India Abroad (2014)
- Fellow, American Academy of Arts and Sciences (elected 2014; resigned 2021)
- Friedrich Weller Prize, Sächsische Akademie der Wissenschaften (2019), for A Rasa Reade
- Corresponding Fellow, British Academy (elected 2020)

== See also ==
- Wendy Doniger
- Alf Hiltebeitel
- David Dean Shulman

== Sources ==
- Pollock, Sheldon (1993). "Rāmāyaṇa and Political Imagination in India". The Journal of Asian Studies. 52 (2): 261–297. doi:10.2307/2059648. JSTOR 2059648. S2CID 154215656.
- Pollock, Sheldon (2006). Language of the Gods in the World of Men: Sanskrit, Culture, and Power in Premodern India. Berkeley: University of California Press.
