= How I Taught My Grandmother to Read =

Book by Sudha Murthy

How I Taught My Grandmother to Read and Other Stories
- Coverpage of the book – "How I Taught My Grandmother to Read and Other Stories"
- Author: Sudha Murty
- Original title: How I taught my grandmother to read and other stories
- Language: English
- Published: Puffin Books
- Publication place: India
- Awards: 7
- ISBN: 9780143335986

How I Taught My Grandmother to Read? (Kannada: ನನ್ನ ಅಜ್ಜಿಗೆ ನಾನು ಹೇಗೆ ಓದಲು ಕಲಿಸಿದೆ?) is a fictional short story written by prolific Indian author Sudha Murthy. This story was published in the book How I Taught My Grandmother to Read and Other Stories in the year 2004 by Penguin Books, India. Later it was included in the Class 9 English Communicative CBSE Syllabus. In the story, the author recalls how she taught her illiterate grandmother to read.

== Plot ==
When the author was a girl of about twelve, she used to stay in a village in North Karnataka with her grandparents. Since the transport system was not very good in those days, they used to get the morning newspaper not until the afternoon. The weekly magazine used to come in a day late. All of them would wait eagerly for the bus, which arrived with the newspapers, weekly magazine and the post.

The story of an old lady and her earnest desire to go to Kashi, where she wished to worship Lord Vishweshwara to attain the ultimate blessings. But finally, the old lady sacrifices all her savings for the marriage of a young, poor girl, who falls in love but there was no money for her wedding so she gave her all her savings.

Impressed by the plot of Kashi Yatre, the author's grandmother Krishtakka would listen to the story as her granddaughter (the author) read the episodes to her. She was so touched as she related with the main character. She could repeat the entire text by heart. She never went to school and so, she couldn't read it by herself. Afterwards, she used to join her friends at the temple park and would discuss the latest episodes.

After Sudha returns from enjoying a week-long wedding with her cousins, she finds her grandmother in tears. When she asks her what the matter was, her grandmother expresses her grief of getting married very early and therefore not getting a chance to receive an education. She explains that while the author was away, Karmaveera came in as usual, but she couldn't read a single alphabet and felt very embarrassed, helpless and dependent. After this, she firmly decides that she will learn to read the Kannada alphabet from the next day onwards and keep the day of Saraswati Puja as the deadline. That day she would be able to read a novel by herself

As a result, from the next day the author started her tuition and found her grandmother to be a very intelligent and hardworking student. She diligently did her homework and slowly learnt to read, repeat, write and recite.

When the Dussehra festival came as usual, the writer secretly bought Kashi Yatre which had been published as a novel by that time. Then suddenly her grandmother bent down and touched her feet. The author found this as extremely bizarre since elders never touch the feet of youngsters and thought that her grandmother had broken the rules of the tradition. But in response to that, her grandmother replied that she was touching the feet of a Guru (teacher), not her 12-year-old granddaughter as it was the custom that a teacher should be respected, irrespective of gender and age. She explained that her granddaughter was a very caring and loving teacher who taught her so well that she could easily read any novel confidently. This way, the author had helped her grandmother to become independent.

The story ends as the author gives the gift to her grandmother and her grandmother is able to read the title Kashi Yatre by Triveni.
