= Wheeler Thackston =

American orientalist

- Born: Wheeler McIntosh Thackston; 1944 (age 81–82)

Academic background
- Education: Princeton University; Harvard University

Academic work
- Discipline: Orientalist
- Institutions: Harvard University

Wheeler McIntosh Thackston (born 1944) is an American Orientalist. He has edited and translated numerous Chaghatai, Arabic, and Persian literary and historical works.

== Life ==
Thackston is a graduate of Princeton's Oriental Studies department, where he was a member of Princeton's Colonial Club, and Harvard's Near Eastern Studies department (Ph.D., 1974), where he was Professor of the Practice of Persian and other Near Eastern Languages from 1972. He studied at Princeton under Martin Dickson and at Harvard with Annemarie Schimmel. Thackston retired from teaching at Harvard in 2007.

His best-known works are Persian and Classical and Qur'anic Arabic grammars and his translations of the Babur-nama, the memoirs of the Mughal prince and emperor Babur, The Gulistan of Saadi, and the memoirs of Emperor Jahangir, or the Jahangir-nama. He has also produced important manuals or editions of texts in Levantine Arabic, Ottoman Turkish, Syriac, Uzbek, Luri, and Kurdish.

He has also studied Urdu and Sindhi but has not published texts from these languages.

Thackston has retired from his position at the Department of Near Eastern Languages and Civilizations, at Harvard University. He currently resides in Cambridge, Massachusetts.

== Works ==
- Thackston, Wheeler M. (1998), Rashiduddin Ashduddin Fazlullah's Jami‘u’t-tawarikh - Compendium of Chronicles - A History of the Mongols, Cambridge, Mass.: Harvard University.
- Thackston, Wheeler M.; An Introduction to Persian. Bethesda, MD: Ibex Publishers. ISBN 978-1-58814-055-5.
- The History of Akbar, Volume 1 (the Akbarnama), by Abu'l-Fazl ibn Mubarak, edited and translated by Wheeler Thackston, Murty Classical Library of India, Harvard University Press (January 2015), hardcover, 656 pages, ISBN 9780674427754.
- Thackston, W. M.; Gulbadan, Begam; Jawhar; Biyāt, Bāyazīd, eds. (2009). Three memoirs of Humayun. Bibliotheca Iranica. Costa Mesa, Calif: Mazda Publishers. ISBN 978-1-56859-178-0.
- Nāṣir-i Khusraw; Thackston, W. M. (2001). Nasir-i Khusraw's Book of travels: Safarnāmah. Bibliotheca Iranica. Costa Mesa, Calif: Mazda Publishers. ISBN 978-1-56859-137-7.
- Thackston, Wheeler M. (2001). Album Prefaces and Other Documents on the History of Calligraphers and Painters. Brill Book Archive Part 1, ISBN 9789004472495. Leiden Boston: BRILL. ISBN 978-90-04-49230-1.
- ʻĀrifī; Thackston, W. M.; Ziai, Hossein (1999). Gūy va chawgān, yā, Ḥālnāmah: The Ball and Polo Stick, or, The Book of Ecstacy: Parallel Persian-English Text. Bibliotheca Iranica. Costa Mesa, CA: Mazda Publishers. ISBN 978-1-56859-090-5.
- Suhrawardī, Yaḥyá ibn Ḥabash; Thackston, W. M.; Suhrawardī, Yaḥyá ibn Ḥabash; Suhrawardī, Yaḥyá ibn Ḥabash (1999). The Philosophical Allegories and Mystical Treatises. Bibliotheca Iranica. Costa Mesa, Calif: Mazda Publishers. ISBN 978-1-56859-091-2.
- Jahangir, Emperor of Hindustan (1999). The Jahangirnama: Memoirs of Jahangir, Emperor of India. Translated by Thackston, Wheeler M. Oxford University Press. ISBN 978-0-19-512718-8.
