= Three Thousand Stitches =

Book by Sudha Murthy

- Author: Sudha Murthy
- Publication date: 2017

Three Thousand Stitches is a book written by Sudha Murthy and published in 2017. The book is a collection of 11 different stories, which she draws from her personal life, with a message engraved in every story. The main story revolves around the live of the sex workers or devadasis, her determination to make them self-sustainable, and to get rid of the label of dishonor that was attached to them.

It is reported that because of her efforts, today there are no temple prostitutes left in the state of Karnataka. The book also discloses her other personal experiences, like being called "cattle class" because of her language & dressing, and to be the only woman to study engineering in an all men's college. She describes her journey from being a little girl to grandmother, from being ignorant to becoming an inspiration, her struggles & victories and offers advice, sometimes boldly and sometimes softly.
