= Philip Lutgendorf =

American linguist

Philip Lutgendorf is an American scholar of Indian language and culture. He is Professor Emeritus of Hindi and Modern Indian Studies at the University of Iowa. His areas of work and interest include the epic poem Ramcharitmanas, the life and works of Hindu poet Tulsidas, the worship of Hanuman, Indian popular cinema, and the Indian tea culture. He translated the Ramcharitmanas into English in seven volumes for the Murty Classical Library of India. He served as the President of American Institute of Indian Studies from 2010 to 2018.

== Education and career ==
Lutgendorf received a B.A. degree from the University of Chicago. In 1987, he received a PhD degree with distinction from the Department of South Asian Languages and Civilizations of the University of Chicago. His dissertation was titled "The Life of a Text: Tulsidas' Ramcaritmanas in Performance."

Since 1985, Lutgendorf has taught at the Department of Asian and Slavic Languages and Literature of the University of Iowa. He has developed and taught courses on several subjects including Hindi language and written and oral narrative traditions of South Asia including the Ramcharitmanas, Hindu tradition, Indian literature, Indian theatre, and Indian cinema.

== Honors and recognition ==
Lutgendorf received the A. K. Coomaraswamy Prize for the book The Life of a Text. In March 2002, he received the Guggenheim Fellowship for research on the Hindu god Hanuman. In 2014, he received the Fulbright-Hays fellowship for research on the cultural history of chai (tea) in India.

Historians Barbara Metcalf and Thomas Metcalf called the website on Hindi films maintained by Lutgendorf "an excellent website on Hindi films." Freek Bakker wrote that Lutgendorf is an "expert in the Indian Ramayana tradition" and has done "profound research into the Ramayana katha tradition."

Dr. Lutgendorf received the Tulsi Award by Pujya Morari Bapu on June 25, 2017, in Estes Park, CO. The Tulsi Award is typically presented on the day of Tulsi Jayanti (the birth date of Goswāmi Tulsidās) and recognises the lineage of those who recite kathas – their efforts to preserve the teachings of the scriptures and maintain the traditions of India.

== Selected bibliography ==
- The Life of a Text: Performing the Ramcaritmanas of Tulsidas, University of California Press. 1991. ISBN 978-0520066908.
- Ramcaritmanas Word Index/Manas shabda anukramanika (with Winand M. Callewaert), New Delhi: Manohar Publisher & Distributors, New Delhi. 1997. ISBN 817304208X.
- From the Ramcaritmanas of Tulsidas, Book Five: Sundar Kand, Indian Literature, vol. XLV, no. 3: 143–181.
- Hanuman's Tale: The Messages of a Divine Monkey, New York: Oxford University Press. 2006. ISBN 9780199885824.
- The Indo-Aryan languages, RoutledgeCurzon, 2002 ISBN 0-7007-1130-9
- Tulsidas: The Epic of Ram (7 volumes), Murty Classical Library of India: Harvard University Press. 2016-2023.
