= Charles Hallisey =

American Buddhist literature lecturer

Charles Hallisey is the Yehan Numata Senior Lecturer on Buddhist Literatures at Harvard Divinity School and an authority on Sinhala literature and Theravada Buddhism.

== Biography ==
Hallisey obtained his AB from Colgate University, M.Div. from Harvard Divinity School and later a MA from the University of Pennsylvania. Subsequently, he received his Ph.D. from the University of Chicago.

From 1996 to 2001 he was John L. Loeb Associate Professor of the Humanities in the Committee on the Study of Religion and the Department of Sanskrit and Indian Studies at Harvard University. Later in 2001 he joined the University of Wisconsin as Associate Professor in the Department of Languages and Cultures of Asia and the Religious Studies Program. He joined the Faculty of Divinity of Harvard Divinity School in the academic year 2007–08.

== Selected works ==
- Therigatha: Poems of the First Buddhist Women. Murty Classical Library of India. Harvard University Press. 2015. ISBN 978-0-674-42773-0.
- "Works and Persons in Sinhala Literary Culture." In Literary cultures in history: Reconstructions from South Asia, edited by Sheldon Pollock, 689-746. Berkeley: University of California Press, 2003.
- "Narrative, Sub-ethics, and the Moral Life: Some Evidence from Theravāda Buddhism." The Journal of Religious Ethics (1996): 305-327.
- "Ethical Particularism in Theravada Buddhism." Journal of Buddhist Ethics 3 (1996): 32-43.
- "Roads Taken and Not Taken in the Study of Theravāda Buddhism." In Curators of the Buddha: The Study of Buddhism under Colonialism, edited by Donald S. Lopez Jr., 31-61. Chicago: University of Chicago Press, 1995.
- "Apropos the Pali Vinaya as a historical document: A reply to Gregory Schopen." Journal of the Pali Text Society 15 (1990): 197-208.
