= Koru Kids =

UK childcare company

Koru Kids is a UK-based childcare company founded in 2016 and headquartered in London. The company provides part-time and full-time nannies and has been covered in national media in connection with childcare policy and family life in the UK. It also attracted political attention after an investment by Akshata Murty, wife of Prime Minister Rishi Sunak, which led to a 2023 standards inquiry and an apology from Sunak; Murty later transferred her shares to charity in 2024.

== History ==
Koru Kids was founded by Rachel Carrell, a former healthcare executive, Rhodes Scholar, and WEF Young Global Leader. Carrell has a doctorate from the University of Oxford and is the company’s CEO.

In 2017, the business was shortlisted for Tech Business of the Year and The Start Up Loans Inspiring Entrepreneur of the Year at the Startups Awards.

The business initially focused on providing university students as after-school nannies in London, later expanding across the UK and broadening its recruitment to include older workers and professional childcarers. By 2025, media reports noted that more than 5,000 families were using Koru Kids each month to search for childcare, with most placements involving part-time arrangements of around 13 hours per week.

Koru Kids launched a home nursery scheme in early 2021 to cover training and set up costs to help new childminders run nurseries in their own home. In June 2023, Koru Kids shuttered the service to focus solely on providing their after-school nannies service citing that "regulations are not currently set up to support childminding agencies becoming financially sustainable.".

A 2023 article in The Guardian highlighted the company’s practice of using formal contracts and paying at least the minimum wage, contrasting this with some other childcare platforms in the UK.

== Research and campaigns ==
Media reporting on Koru Kids’ commissioned research has highlighted issues of childcare access, affordability, and parental leave. A 2024 study found that many parents struggled to access wraparound care, with children spending an average of 1.5 hours on screens after school when provision was unavailable.

In 2023, another survey reported widespread dissatisfaction with UK paternity leave packages, particularly around length of leave, pay, and workplace flexibility.

The company and its founder have also been cited in wider discussions of childcare policy. BBC News covered its analysis of government wraparound childcare plans, while Rachel Carrell has been quoted on family policy in national outlets including The Independent.

== Investors and political attention ==
In 2019, Akshata Murty, wife of Rishi Sunak, invested in Koru Kids through her venture fund Catamaran Ventures.

In April 2023, after becoming Prime Minister, Sunak faced a parliamentary investigation for failing to declare his wife’s shares when questioned about childcare policy. The Parliamentary Commissioner for Standards concluded the omission was “inadvertent” but required Sunak to apologise. In January 2024, Murty announced she had transferred her shares to charity.

Koru Kids has also received investment from venture capital funds including AlbionVC, Forward Partners, JamJar, Global Founders Capital, and Atomico.
