= Mansi Kasliwal =

Indian-American astronomer

Mansi Manoj Kasliwal is an Indian-born American astronomer, a professor of astronomy at the California Institute of Technology (Caltech), and the director of the Palomar Observatory. Her research has used multi-messenger astronomy to study the nucleosynthesis of elements heavier than iron, in processes that go beyond the more common stellar nucleosynthesis, including supernovae and neutron star mergers. To find these events she has helped develop automated sky surveys including the Palomar Transient Factory and Zwicky Transient Facility.

== Education and career ==
Kasliwal is originally from a dairy farm in Indore, in India, and emigrated to the United States at age 15 for her education, leaving her parents behind. After high school at the Pomfret School in Connecticut and through Bryn Mawr College, she graduated with a bachelor's degree in 2005 from Cornell University. She continued her studies at Caltech, where she received a master's degree in 2005 and completed her Ph.D. in 2011. Her dissertation, Bridging the gap: Elusive explosions in the local universe, was supervised by Shrinivas Kulkarni.

After postdoctoral research as a NASA Hubble Fellow at the Carnegie Observatories of the Carnegie Institution for Science, she returned to Caltech with a visiting position in 2014 and a regular-rank assistant professor position in 2015. She was promoted directly to full professor in 2021. In 2025, Kasliwal was named as director of the Palomar Observatory, becoming its first woman director and its first director of Indian origin.

== Recognition ==
Kasliwal was a recipient of the 2022 New Horizons in Physics Prize, given "for leadership in laying foundations for electromagnetic observations of sources of gravitational waves, and leadership in extracting rich information from the first observed collision of two neutron stars".
