= Infosys Foundation =

Indian non-profit organisation

- Formation: 1996; 30 years ago
- Type: non-profit organization
- Headquarters: Bengaluru, Karnataka
- Region served: India and United States of America
- Method: Donations and grants
- Key people: Salil Parekh (Chairperson)
- Endowment: IN₹43.6 billion as of 26 February 2016
- Website: www.infosys.com/infosys-foundation

Infosys Foundation is a non-profit organisation based in Karnataka, India, established in 1996 by Infosys to support the underprivileged sections of society. It supports programs in the areas of education, rural development, healthcare, arts and culture, and destitute care in remote regions of India. The foundation is solely funded by Infosys, and no external donations are accepted.

Infosys Foundation, USA, is an American branch of the Infosys Foundation, and supports several science, technology, engineering and mathematics and community building initiatives.

== Social projects ==
=== Healthcare ===
The foundation has augmented existing healthcare infrastructure, access to primary healthcare, awareness of basic hygiene, and treatment of underprivileged patients, and has donated more than 50 crore rupees to expand the capacity of hospitals across India.

It has constructed hospital wards and built dharmashalas (rest houses) at the National Institute of Mental Health and Neuro Sciences (NIMHANS) in Bangalore. It has also donated medicines and medical equipment to hospitals, in addition to organising health camps in rural India.

=== Education ===
The foundation partners with schools in rural India to enhance education and library facilities and to promote primary education among underprivileged children. It has donated to various educational institutes in India, such as the Chennai Mathematical Institute, and the Indian Institute of Science.

=== Arts and culture ===
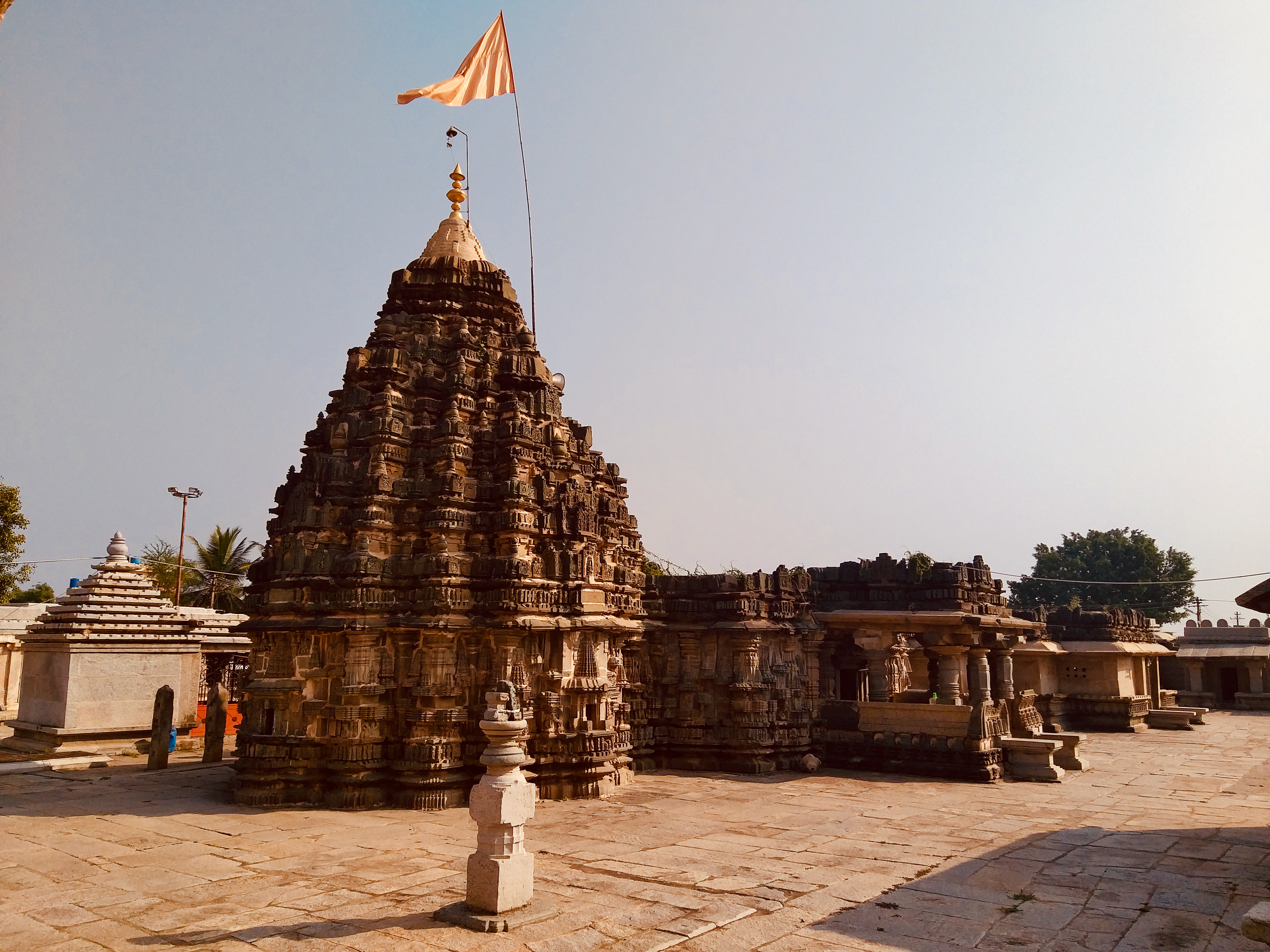
Someshwara temple, Lakshmeshwara was restored by the Infosys Foundation

The foundation assists underprivileged artists and authors by offering financial assistance, promoting their art, or helping them receive recognition. It contributed 70 lakh rupees (about $100,000) for the academy established by the Bhavan's Tiruchi Kendra. Underprivileged and talented young artists will be promoted by the bhavan by providing them a platform.

=== Destitute Care ===
The foundation supports programs of NGOs in rural areas across India. It provides vocational training to help the destitute to live with dignity and earn a livelihood, and partners with NGOs to support destitute children and women.

=== Rural Development ===
The foundation undertakes programs to improve the welfare of people in rural India and has donated more than 40 crore rupees for rural development and livelihood projects such as awareness campaigns on hygiene, sanitation, vocational training and entrepreneurship, It works with local administration to achieve community development goals. The foundation constructs roads, provides drainage systems and electricity, and rehabilitates flood-affected victims in rural areas.

== See also ==
- Infosys
- Sudha Murthy
