= Namibia Economic Policy Research Unit =

Namibian research institute

The Namibia Economic Policy Research Unit (NEPRU) was a Namibian non-governmental organization whose mission was "to support Namibia's national development goals by providing economic policy advice, conducting economic research and building economic research capacity", according to its website which is now offline. NEPRU, which was established in 1990 when Namibia attained independence, closed down in 2011 after a drawn-out financial crisis. During its 20 years of existence, it generated a wide range of consultancy reports and was funded through "income from commissioned research and financial as well as technical support from International Cooperation partners".
