= Hitachi Consulting =

American international consulting firm

Hitachi Consulting Corporation
- Type: Division
- Industry: Professional services
- Predecessor: Experio Solutions
- Founded: Dallas, Texas (2000; 26 years ago)
- Defunct: January 2020
- Headquarters: Dallas, Texas, U.S.
- Key people: Hicham Abdessamad (President & CEO)
- Services: Management consulting
- Number of employees: 6,500 (2015)
- Parent: Hitachi
- Website: www.hitachiconsulting.com

Hitachi Consulting Corporation was an American international management and technology consulting firm with headquarters in Dallas, Texas. It was founded in November 2000 as a subsidiary of the Japanese corporation Hitachi, and employed approximately 6,500 people in the US, Japan, Brazil, China, India, Portugal, Singapore, Spain, the UK, Germany, and Vietnam.

== History ==
Hitachi Consulting was founded in November 2000 when the Japanese multinational corporation Hitachi acquired Grant Thornton LLP’s Chicago based information technology and strategy consulting practice. Three former Grant Thornton principals (Chuck Scoville - COO, Mike Driessen - Sales/Marketing, and Dan Raskas - Delivery of Services) were the founding leadership team along with 18 former Grant Thornton partners and principals.

Since then, the company has acquired a number of consulting competitors including WaveBend Solutions from BDO Seidman (June 2001), Tactica Technology (November 2001), Aspirity (April 2004), Dove Consulting (August 2005), Navigator Systems (February 2006), Impact Plus through the subsidiary Hitachi Consulting UK (April 2007), Iteration2 (June 2007), and JMN Associates (March 2008). After the dissolution of Arthur Andersen, 23 partners and 370 consultants of Arthur Andersen Business Consulting (AABC) also joined the company in June 2002.

At the time of its initial acquisition from Grant Thornton, Hitachi Consulting was named Experio Solutions. This name remained until an agreement was reached to license the Hitachi name in 2003. In April 2006, Exsurge, a Hitachi-owned Japanese consulting firm, was accordingly renamed Hitachi Consulting Co., Ltd.

== Timeline ==
In November 2005, Hitachi opened a Global Solutions Center in India, which offers IT and project management support.

Hitachi Consulting Europe (HCE) was founded in March 2006 through the establishment of subsidiaries in the United Kingdom, Spain and Portugal.

In March 2009, Hitachi Consulting successfully acquired Edenbrook, a UK-based Microsoft and Oracle implementation partner. This doubled its UK consulting and implementation capacity.

On January 4, 2011, Hitachi Consulting announced the acquisition of Sierra Atlantic, a leader in offshore enterprise applications and outsourced product development with approximately 2500 employees, headquartered in Newark, California, with development centers in Hyderabad and Guangzhou. The company was founded by Raju Reddy, Sarath Sura, and Yeshwanth Reddy in 1993, and initiated business alliances with Oracle and Microsoft in 1994.

On April 13, 2012, Hitachi Consulting acquired Prizim, a consulting firm dedicated to sustainable environmental, energy, and social responsibility solutions. PRIZIM now serves as the Environmental Sustainability Solutions practice of Hitachi Consulting.

On December 31, 2012, Hitachi Consulting acquired Celerant Consulting, an international management consulting firm. Celerant was integrated into the Information and Telecommunications Systems business unit.

On May 1, 2014, Hitachi Consulting announced that it had acquired IMGroup, a specialist UK-based provider of Information Management and Business Intelligence services.

On October 1, 2014, Hitachi Consulting acquired Singapore-based consulting firm Stone Apple Solutions and its subsidiaries, including Vietnamese-based Global CyberSoft (GCS) and Brazil-based F2C Consultoria. This greatly increased Hitachi Consulting's global reach in Southeast Asia, with additional offices in Thailand, Malaysia, Indonesia, and Australia.

On September 17, 2019, it was announced that Hitachi would integrate Hitachi Vantara and Hitachi Consulting to accelerate global expansion of Hitachi's Social Innovation Business and Digital Growth. As of January 2020, the integrated companies operate under the Hitachi Vantara brand and are led by Toshiaki Tokunaga.
