= The Battle for Sanskrit =

2016 book by Rajiv Malhotra

The Battle for Sanskrit: Is Sanskrit Political or Sacred, Oppressive or Liberating, Dead or Alive?
- Cover of the book The Battle for Sanskrit
- Author: Rajiv Malhotra
- Language: English
- Subject: Sheldon Pollock
- Publisher: HarperCollins India
- Publication date: 2016
- Publication place: India
- Pages: 488
- ISBN: 978-93-5177-538-6 (Hardcover)
- Website: http://thebattleforsanskrit.com

The Battle for Sanskrit: Is Sanskrit Political or Sacred, Oppressive or Liberating, Dead or Alive? is a 2016 book written by Rajiv Malhotra which criticizes the academic discipline of Indology, as practiced by Western scholars and particularly Sheldon Pollock.

Malhotra criticizes the hegemony of "Western" approaches in studying India esp. Sanskrit texts and frames a rebuttal from within the traditions of Tarka sastra. Lamenting the increasing hold of Western thoughtschools even among Indian indologists, historians, and journalists, he urges for the mainstreaming of "traditional indigenous" approaches. In a review, Bibek Debroy commended Malhotra for exhorting the need of alternative paradigms in Indology notwithstanding the polemics against Pollock.

The book found support in the Hindu Right; it was cited in a petition urging for the removal of Sheldon Pollock from the editorship of the Murty Classical Library of India.

== See also ==
- Breaking India
- Invading the Sacred
