= Deshpande Foundation =

- Formation: 1996
- Type: Non-governmental organization
- Purpose: Promoting entrepreneurship and innovation as catalysts for change
- Headquarters: Stoneham, Massachusetts, United States
- Region served: United States, India.
- President of Foundation: Gururaj (Desh), Jaishree Deshpande
- Website: Deshpande Foundation

Deshpande Foundation is a non-governmental organization founded in 1996 in the US by Dr. Gururaj (Desh) and Jaishree Deshpande to accelerate the creation of sustainable and scalable enterprises that have significant social and economic impact. Foundation has embarked on large-scale projects in the United States and India such as:

- Entrepreneurship for All.
- The Hubli Sandbox in Hubli, Karnataka, India.
- The Deshpande Center for Social Entrepreneurship in Hubli, Karnataka.
- The MIT Deshpande Center for Technological Innovation in Boston, Massachusetts.
- The Indus Entrepreneurs (TiE), in both the US and across India.
- The Indo US Collaboration for Engineering Education (IUCEE).

The foundation runs numerous programs in its Indian wing. Few of them are listed below.

- LEAD - LEADer's Accelerating Development Program. - Offers students an opportunity to make a change in their world. Program works with students who have big ideas for a better India, and wants them to see that vision transform into reality.
- Deshpande Fellowship Program.
- Deshpande Education trust - nurtures innovative ideas and inspires entrepreneurial acumen in youth.
- Master of Social Entrepreneurship - a two-year residential program affiliated with Karnatak University Dharwad.
