= Shrinivas Kulkarni =

American-Indian astronomer (born 1956)

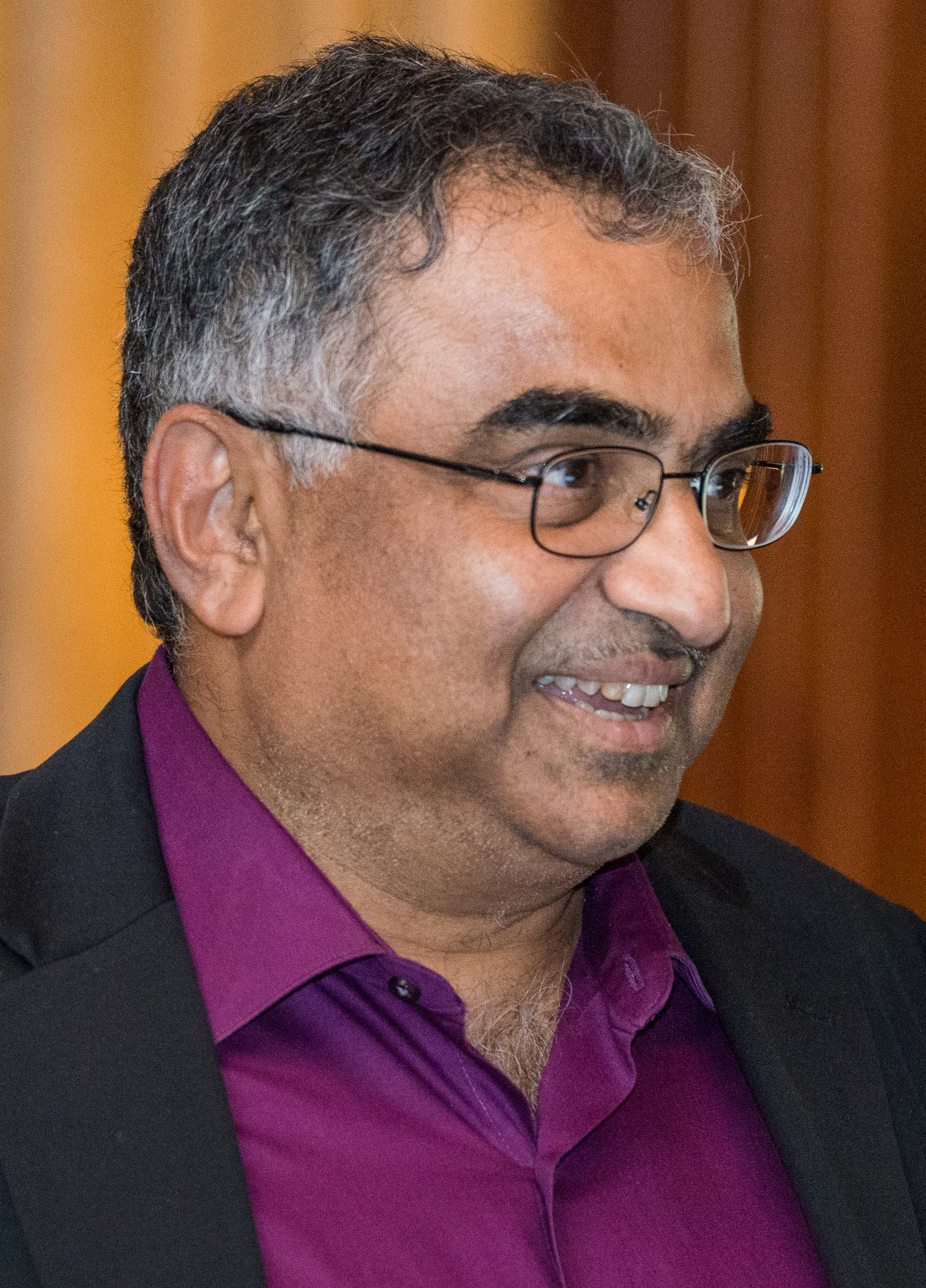
- Kulkarni in 2016
- Born: 4 October 1956 (age 69); Kurundwad, Maharashtra, India
- Education: IIT Delhi, UC Berkeley
- Awards: FRS (2001); US NAS (2003); Indian Academy of Sciences (2012); Royal Netherlands Academy of Arts and Sciences (2016); Helen B. Warner Prize (1991); NSF Waterman Prize (1992); Jansky Prize (2002); Dan David Prize (2017); Shaw Prize (2024)
- Scientific career
- Fields: Astronomy: Interstellar Medium; Pulsars; Millisecond Pulsars, Brown Dwarf; Soft Gamma-ray Repeaters; Gamma-ray Bursts; Optical Transients
- Workplaces: California Institute of Technology
- Doctoral advisor: Carl E. Heiles; Donald C. Backer
- Notable students: Mansi Kasliwal; Alicia M. Soderberg

Shrinivas Ramchandra Kulkarni (born 4 October 1956) is an Indian American astronomer. He is a professor of astronomy and planetary science at the California Institute of Technology (Caltech), and was the director of the Caltech Optical Observatory (COO), overseeing the Palomar and Keck among other telescopes.

== Early life and education ==
Shrinivas Ramchandra Kulkarni was born on 4 October 1956 in the small town of Kurundwad in Maharashtra, into a Hindu family. His father, Dr. R. H. Kulkarni, was a surgeon based in Hubballi and his mother, Vimala Kulkarni, was a home-maker. He is one of four children and has three sisters, Sunanda Kulkarni, Sudha Murthy (educator, author, philanthropist and wife of one of the co-founders of Infosys) and Jaishree Deshpande (wife of Gururaj Deshpande).

Kulkarni and his sisters grew up in Hubballi, Karnataka, and received their schooling at local schools there. He obtained his MS in applied physics from the Indian Institute of Technology, Delhi in 1978 and his PhD from the University of California, Berkeley in 1983.

== Career ==
In 1987, Kulkarni obtained a position as faculty at the California Institute of Technology. ADS shows that his papers cover following fields: (1) HI absorption studies of Milky Way Galaxy, (2) pulsars, millisecond pulsars, and globular cluster pulsars, (3) brown dwarfs and other sub-stellar objects, (4) soft gamma-ray repeaters, (5) gamma-ray bursts, and (6) optical transients.

Kulkarni started off his career as a radio astronomer. He studied the Milky Way Galaxy using HI absorption under the guidance of his advisor Carl Heiles, and observed its four arms.

He discovered the first millisecond pulsar called PSR B1937+21 with Donald Backer and colleagues, while he was a graduate student. In 1986, he found the first optical counterpart of binary pulsars, while he was a Millikan Fellow at California Institute of Technology. He was instrumental in discovery of the first globular cluster pulsar in 1987 using a supercomputer.

With Dale Frail at NRAO and Toshio Murakami and his colleagues at ISAS (predecessor of JAXA that was led by Yasuo Tanaka at that time), Kulkarni showed that soft gamma-ray repeaters are neutron stars associated with supernova remnants. This discovery eventually led to the understanding that neutron stars with extremely high magnetic field called magnetars are the soft gamma-ray repeaters.

Caltech-NRAO team which he led showed in 1997 that gamma-ray bursts came from extra-galactic sources, and identified optical counterparts. Their research initiated the detailed studies of the sources of gamma-ray bursts along with the European team led by Jan van Paradijs.

He was also a member of the Caltech team that observed the first irrefutable brown dwarf in 1994 that orbited around a star called Gliese 229.

His recent work involved Palomar Transient Factory which has succeeded in identifying the new groups of optical transients such as superluminous supernovae, calcium-rich supernovae, and luminous red novae.

== Awards and honours ==
Some of the awards he has received include the following:

- NSF's Alan T. Waterman Award in 1992
- Helen B. Warner Prize from the American Astronomical Society in 1991
- Jansky Prize in 2002
- Dan David Prize in 2017
- Gold Medal of the Royal Astronomical Society in 2026

In 2015, he received an honorary doctorate from Radboud University in the Netherlands. In 2024, he was awarded the Shaw Prize in Astronomy.

== Services to the field ==
Kulkarni has been the Jury Chair for the Infosys Prize for the discipline of Physical Sciences since 2009. The prize is awarded by the Infosys Foundation, whose founder is Kulkarni's brother-in-law, Narayana Murthy.

Kulkarni is a member of four national academies. He was elected a Fellow of the Royal Society, London, in 2001, a member of the United States National Academy of Sciences in 2003, an honorary fellow of Indian Academy of Sciences in 2012, and a foreign member of the Royal Netherlands Academy of Arts and Sciences on 12 September 2016.
