= Gururaj Deshpande =

Indian-American entrepreneur

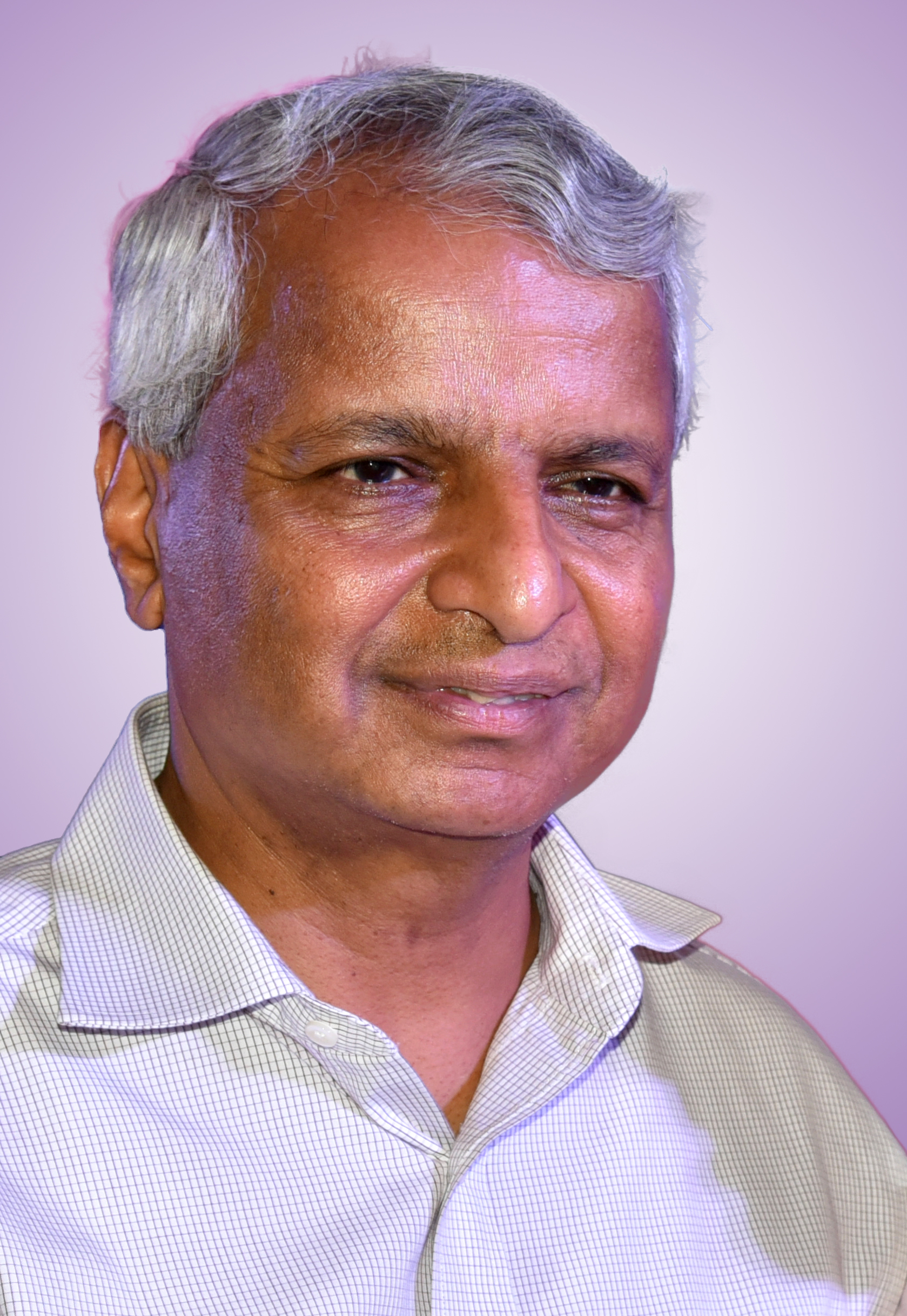
- Born: Hubli, Karnataka, India
- Education: IIT Madras; Queen's University
- Occupations: Chairman of Sycamore Networks, A123 Systems, Tejas Networks
- Spouse: Jayshree Deshpande
- Website: sycamorenet.com

Gururaj Deshpande ("Desh" Deshpande) is an Indian American venture capitalist and entrepreneur, who is best known for co-founding the Chelmsford, Massachusetts-based internet equipment manufacturer Sycamore Networks, the Deshpande Center for Technological Innovation at MIT and the Deshpande Foundation.

Presently, Deshpande is the Chairman of A123Systems, Sycamore Networks, Tejas Networks, HiveFire, Sandstone Capital, Sparta Group, and sits on the Board of Airvana.

Deshpande is a life member of the MIT Corporation, the Board of Trustees of MIT, and sits on the board of the MIT School of Engineering Dean's Advisory Council (DAC).

== Early life and education ==
Gururaj Deshpande was born in Hubli, Karnataka in India. His father was a labor commissioner with the Indian government.

He graduated with a Bachelor of Technology in Electrical Engineering from the Indian Institute of Technology Madras. He completed his PhD in Data Communications from Faculty of Engineering & Applied Science at Queen's University in Ontario, Canada and a Master of Electrical Engineering from the University of New Brunswick in Fredericton, New Brunswick, Canada.

== Career ==
Deshpande started his career at Codex Corporation, a Motorola subsidiary located in Ontario, Canada which manufactured modems, before moving to the U.S. in 1984. Later, he co-founded Coral Networks, a router developer. He left the company prior to its sale in 1993 to SynOptics. He sold the company for $15 million.

Deshpande knew Peter Brackett PhD, a professor of electrical engineering at Queen's university in Ontario for a few years in between industry positions. Brackett offered Deshpande a job at Codex. Brackett also sponsored him for Canadian residency.

In 1990, Deshpande co-founded Cascade Communications, whose products were important in routing the early internet, initially as its president and later executive vice president; he hired Dan Smith as CEO. He sold Cascade to Ascend Communications for $3.7 billion in 1997.

Subsequently, with the help of MIT researchers, he launched Sycamore Networks in 1998. Sycamore Networks went public in October 1999, and raised a market cap of $18 billion. With his 21% shareholding in hand, this IPO made Deshpande one of the wealthiest self-made businessmen in the world. In 2000, he was featured on the Forbes 400 listing of Richest Americans.

He is also chairman of A123Systems, which manufactures high-power lithium-ion batteries, which went on NASDAQ in October 2009, and raised $438 million and trading at a 50% premium on the day of listing.

In July 2010, Deshpande was appointed by President Barack Obama to co-chair the National Advisory Council on Innovation and Entrepreneurship.

== Philanthropy ==
Deshpande, along with his wife Jaishree, donated $20 million to launch the Deshpande Center for Technological Innovation (DCTI) at MIT.

In 2012, he founded the Dunin-Deshpande Queen's Innovation Centre at Queen's University. It encourages and supports entrepreneurial initiatives through incubators, workshops, programs, courses, and pitch competitions.

Deshpande was the chairman of Akshaya Patra USA from 2008 to 2020.

== Personal life ==
Deshpande is married to Jaishree Deshpande née Kulkarni, who is the sister of Sudha Murthy (wife of Infosys founder Narayan Murthy) and Caltech astrophysicist Shrinivas Kulkarni. She is the co-founder of the Deshpande Center for Technological Innovation at MIT. The couple have two children and live in Chelmsford, Massachusetts, US. They also maintain a residence in their native Hubli, India.
