= Rajiv Malhotra =

Indian-American author (born 1950)

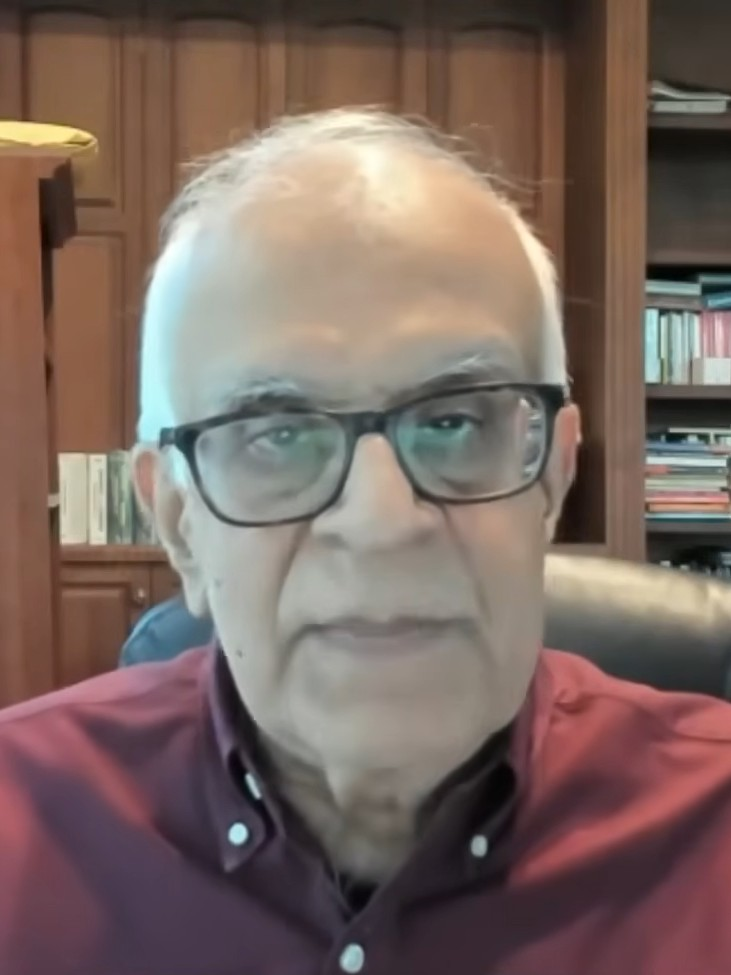
- Malhotra in 2025
- Born: 15 September 1950 (age 76); New Delhi, Delhi, India
- Citizenship: American
- Education: St. Stephen's College, Delhi; Syracuse University
- Occupations: Author; researcher; professor
- Notable work: Breaking India (2011), Being Different (2011), Indra's Net (2014), The Battle for Sanskrit (2016)

YouTube information
- Channel: Infinity Foundation Official
- Genres: Civilizations; cross-cultural encounters; religion; science
- Subscribers: 584 thousand
- Views: 89.6 million
- Last updated: 11 July 2026
- Website: rajivmalhotra.com

Rajiv Malhotra (born 15 September 1950) is an Indian-American author, public intellectual, and a public proponent of Hindutva. He is the founder of Infinity Foundation, an organisation known to focus on Indic studies, (Note: On the Infinity Foundation: Kurien: "The next Indic studies organisation established in the United States was the Educational Council of Indic Traditions (ECIT), which was founded in 2000 (along with an associated Indictraditions Internet discussion group) under the auspices of the Infinity Foundation, based in New Jersey. The Infinity Foundation was formed in 1995 by the wealthy Indian American entrepreneur Rajiv Malhotra, who, after a career in the software, computer, and telecom industries had taken an early retirement to pursue philanthropic and educational activities. As Indic studies gradually became the main focus of the Infinity Foundation, the ECIT was disbanded (the Indictraditions group was also closed down later, in the summer of 2003)."; Nussbaum: "The chief antagonist behind these attacks is Rajiv Malhotra, a very wealthy man who lives in New Jersey and heads the Infinity Foundation, which has made grants in the area of Hinduism studies."; Taylor: "... Rajiv Malhotra, a self-described Indian-American entrepreneur, philanthropist and community leader. Malhotra had graduated from St Stephen's College, Delhi, in 1971, and came to the US to pursue degrees in physics and computer science, where his subsequent career spanned the software, telecom and media industries (Ramaswamy, de Nicolas and Banerjee, 2007, p. 472, n.5). He left the business world in 1995 to establish the Infinity Foundation, a non-profit organisation that seeks to promote East-West dialogue and a proper understanding of the Indian civilizational experience in the world, particularly in the United States and India.") and financially aid Columbia University's project to translate the Tibetan Buddhist Tengyur.

He has been called a Hindu nationalist, due to his prolifically writing in opposition to the western academic study of Indian culture and society, which he maintains denigrates the tradition and undermines the interests of India "by encouraging the paradigms that oppose its unity and integrity". Malhotra has authored books that cover subjects such as civilisational studies, comparative religion, philosophy of science that espouse ideals of Indic traditions and their position in the global discourse.

== Early life and education ==
Malhotra was born on September 15, 1950 in New Delhi, India. He earned his undergraduate education in physics at St. Stephen's College, Delhi. He subsequently moved to the United States where he earned a degree in computer science from Syracuse University.

== Career ==
In 1995, Malhotra established Infinity foundation in Princeton, New Jersey.

Malhotra had been a speaker at an international conference held at the Center for Indic Studies, University of Massachusetts Dartmouth and was a board member of the Foundation for Indic Philosophy and Culture at the Claremont Colleges. He also wrote extensively on internet discussion groups and e-magazines.

In October 2018, Malhotra was appointed an honorary visiting professor at the Centre for Media Studies at Jawaharlal Nehru University, Delhi. On 6 November 2018, he delivered his first lecture organized by the School of Sanskrit and Indic studies on the topic of Sanskrit non-translatables. As of May 2026, Malhotra serves as the chairman of Center for Indic Studies.

== Infinity Foundation ==
Malhotra founded the institute in 1994; followed by Educational Council of Indic Traditions (ECIT) in 2000. The foundation works without any full-time workers other than the Malhotra himself. The stated goals were to fight a perceived misrepresentation of ancient Indian religions and to document the contributions of India to world civilization. No member of the advisory board was an academic and most belonged to the software industry.

The Foundation has given more than 400 grants for research, education and community work. Financially aids Columbia University's project to translate the Tibetan Buddhist Tengyur. It has also provided small grants to major universities in support of programs including a visiting professorship in Indic studies at Harvard University, Yoga and Hindi classes at Rutgers University, the research and teaching of non-dualistic philosophies at the University of Hawaii, Global Renaissance Institute and a Center for Buddhist studies at Columbia University, a program in religion and science at the University of California, an endowment for the Center for Advanced Study of India at the University of Pennsylvania, and lectures at the Center for Consciousness Studies at the University of Arizona. The foundation has provided funding for journals like Education about Asia and the International Journal of Hindu Studies and for the establishment of the Mahatma Gandhi Center for Global Nonviolence at James Madison University.

== Views ==
=== Criticism of American academia (2000s) ===
==== Wendy's Child Syndrome ====
In early 2000s Malhotra started writing articles criticising Wendy Doniger and related scholars, claiming that she applied Freudian psycho-analysis to aspects of Indian culture. His 2002 blog post titled "Wendy's Child Syndrome" was considered as the starting point of a "rift between some Western Hinduism scholars [...] and some conservative Hindus in India, the United States, and elsewhere". Martha Nussbaum has called it a "war" by "the Hindu right" against American scholars.

The blog post "has become a pivotal treatise in a recent rift between some Western Hinduism scholars—many of whom teach or have studied at Chicago—and some conservative Hindus in India, the United States, and elsewhere". Malhotra concluded in his blog post: "Rights of individual scholars must be balanced against rights of cultures and communities they portray, especially minorities that often face intimidation. Scholars should criticize but not define another's religion."

According to Braverman, "Though Malhotra's academic targets say he has some valid discussion points, they also argue that his rhetoric taps into the rightward trend and attempts to silence unorthodox, especially Western, views." (Note: See also Jeffrey J. Kipal, "The Tantric Truth of the Matter: A Forthright Response to Rajiv Malhotra")

The essay, together with a series of related essays and interviews, has been republished in Academic Hinduphobia, in the wake of the withdrawal of Doniger's The Hindus: An Alternative History from the Indian market, due to a lawsuit "alleging that it was biased and insulting to Hindus". The withdrawal led to extensive media attention, and renewed sales in India. Malhotra said "the drama has diverted attention away from the substantive errors in her scholarship to be really about being an issue of censorship by radical Hindus", hence the republication of his critique of Wendy Doniger and scholars related to her. (Note: The bundle contains the following essays: 1. The Academic Cult of Eroticizing Hindus (Note: See The Academic Cult of Eroticizing Hindus. Interview with Vishal Agarwal); 2. The Asymmetric Dialog of Civilizations; 3. The Axis of Neocolonialism; 4. RISA Lila - 1: Wendy's Child Syndrome (Note: See RISA Lila – 1: Wendy's Child Syndrome); 5. RISA Lila - 2: Limp Scholarship and Demonology (Note: See RISA Lila – 2 – Limp Scholarship And Demonology); 6. Wendy Doniger on the Couch: A Tantric Psychoanalysis (2015) (Note: See Swarajya magazine, "'Oh, Doctor!' Wendy Doniger On The Couch (A Tantric-Psychoanalysis)": "Rajiv Malhotra interviews Stuart Sovatsky an American scholar and practitioner of Psychology and Hindu traditions on the Wendy Doniger syndrome."); 7. The Insider/Outsider: Academic Game of Sarah Caldwell; 8. Response to Jeffrey Kripal's Sulekha Article; 9. The Bindi as a Drop of Menstrual Blood; 10. The Interpretation of Gods; 11. The Washington Post and Hinduphobia (Note: See: Shankar Vedantam, "Wrath over a Hindu God", and Malhotra's response, "Washington Post and Hinduphobia"); 12. Challenging The Washington Post; 13. Hinduism in American Classrooms)

==== American academia ====
In his 2003 blog post "Does South Asian Studies Undermine India?" at Rediff India Abroad: India as it happens, Malhotra criticises what he views as uncritical funding of South Asian Studies by Indian-American donors:

Many eminent Indian-American donors are being led down the garden path by Indian professors who, ironically, assemble a team of scholars to undermine Indian culture. Rather than an Indian perspective on itself and the world, these scholars promote a perspective on India using worldviews which are hostile to India's interests.

Malhotra voices four criticisms of American academia. Primarily, he claims "American academia is dominated by a Eurocentric perspective that views western culture as being the fount of world civilisation and refuses to acknowledge the contributions of non-western societies such as India to European culture and technique". Then, he goes on to say that the academic study of religion in the United States is based on the model of the "Abrahamic" traditions; this model is not applicable to Hinduism. He says Western scholars focus on the "sensationalist, negative attributes of religion and present it in a demeaning way that shows a lack of respect for the sentiments of the practitioners of the religion". His final claim is that South Asian Studies programs in the United States create "a false identity and unity" between India and its Muslim neighbour states, and undermine India "by focusing on its internal cleavages and problems".

Malhotra argues that American scholarship has undermined India "by encouraging the paradigms that oppose its unity and integrity", with scholars playing critical roles, often under the garb of 'human rights' in channeling foreign intellectual and material support to exacerbate India's internal fault lines. He claims Indian-American donors were "hoodwinked" into thinking they were supporting India through their monetary contributions to such programmes. Malhotra compares the defence of Indian interests with corporate brand management, distrusting the loyalties of Indian scholars.

Therefore, it is critical that we do not blindly assume that Indian scholars are always honest trustees of the Indian-American donors' sentiments. Many Indian scholars are weak in the pro-India leadership and assertiveness traits that come only from strongly identifying with an Indian Grand Narrative.
They regard the power of Grand Narrative (other than their own) as a cause of human rights problems internally, failing to see it as an asset in global competition externally. Hence, there is the huge difference between the ideology of many Indian professors and the ideology espoused by most successful Indian-American corporate leaders.

Malhotra argues that a positive stance on India has been under-represented in American academia, due to programmes being staffed by Westerners, their "Indian-American Sepoys" and Indian Americans who want to be white – whom he disparages as "career opportunists" and "Uncle Toms", who "in their desire to become even marginal members of the Western Grand Narrative, sneer at Indian culture in the same manner as the colonialists once did". Malhotra has accused academia of abetting the "Talibanisation" of India, which would also lead to the radicalisation of other Asian countries.

==== U-turn theory ====
Malhotra posits that the Western appropriation of Indic ideas and knowledge systems has a long history. He names this theory of his "The U-Turn Theory". He then goes on to show how the appropriation occurs in several stages:

1. In the first stage, a Westerner approaches an Indian guru or tradition with extreme deference, acquires the knowledge as a sincere disciple, lives in the ashram and adopts the usage of Hindu iconography.
2. Once the transfer of knowledge is complete, the former disciple, and their followers progressively erase all traces of the original source, such as removal of the Sanskrit terms and historic context of India. The knowledge gets repackaged as the idea of their own thought or they claim to be universal by removal of the Indian heritage, and may even proceed to denigrate the source Indian tradition. At this stage, the traditional Indian knowledge gets decontextualized and Christianized.
3. In the final stage, the ideas are exported back to India by the former disciple and/or his followers for consumption as Western science or as 'superior' thought. Malhotra cites numerous examples to support this theory, dating from the erasure of Upanishadic and Vijnanavada Buddhist influences on Plotinus (Note: The possible influence of Indian thought on Plotinus was mentioned already by his student and biographer Porphyry (3rd c. CE): "he became eager to make acquaintance with the Persian philosophical discipline and that prevailing among the Indians." Blurb for Paulos Mar Gregorios (2002), Neoplatonism and Indian Philosophy, SUNY Press: "During the last two centuries a remarkable similarity between the philosophical system of Plotinus (205 270 A.D.) and those of various Hindu philosophers in various centuries, including some that lived prior to the Third Century A.D. has been discovered." See also R. Baine Harris (ed).(1982), Neoplatonism and Indian Thought, SUNY Press) to the modern day reimportation of Christian Yoga into India.

As evidence, he cites a number of "U-Turners" from the scholarly fields of mind sciences, cognitive sciences and psychology: (Note: Other examples include: Stephen LaBerge, prominent professor of cognitive science at Stanford University measured the effects of Yoga nidra and coined the term Lucid dream, leading to establishments of multiple institutes. However, LaBerge does not ackowldege Indian and Tibetian advanced meditators as scientific peers, whom he worked with for his PhD dissertation. Malhotra states, LaBerge later called the discovery as his own as part his proprietary Lucrative Movement.; Francisco Varela, co-founder of Mind and Life Institute, despite being initiated by Dalai Lama into advanced Indo-Tibetian techniques over many decades, repackaged every idea into his "new" discovery, which Varela called Neurophenomenology based on Husserl's philosophy, although the philosophy was a merely a theory. Varela's home page and articles are entirely about "Western science" and disguise all the Indian sources. His students miss the fact that, he learned this as a practitioner of Buddhist meditation for 25 years until his death in 2001.; Evan Thompson, one of the Verela's ace student who now distanced himself openly from the Indian source traditions, although his PhD thesis was on Madhyamaka Buddhism. Thompson claims that, he learned everything by his own research using Epistemology and findings of Verela as starting point. Furthermore, Thompson doesn't considers Indo-Tibetan sources as relevant to his research anymore, despite Verela's works being heavily based on Buddhist meditation practices. Malhotra points out how the dominant culture's appropriations are installed as locus for future generations, such as Thompson.)

- The theory of multiple intelligences by Howard Gardner was inspired from the original works of Sri Aurobindo's Planes and Parts of the Being.
- The techniques followed in Herbert Benson's 1975 book The Relaxation Response matches that of Maharishi Mahesh Yogi's Transcendental Meditation (TM) teachings, but Malhotra critiques that Benson doesn't acknowledge the source on his scholarly works. Malhotra refers to various western sources to support his argument. (Note: Namely: * Benson, Herbert (1974). "Your Innate Asset for Combating Stress". Harvard Business Review. * Oreme-Johnson, David W.; Waltson, Kenneth G. (1998). "All approaches to preventing or reversing effects of stress are not the same" (PDF). * Resnick, Lloyd (2011). "A once(and future) meditator tries the relaxation response for stress". Harvard Health Publishing.) Furthermore, Malhotra claims that, Benson nudges towards Christianization through his 1987 book Your Maximum Mind by introducing faith and hope into his trademark technique, Benson Method, through funding from the Templeton Foundation.
- Daniel Goleman, famously known as the originator of Emotional intelligence, didn't mention the teachings of Neem Karoli Baba in his academic work, who had a primary influence on Goleman during his time in India. Although Goleman used Dalai Lama for his introductions, he was peer pressured to disguise the "Indian background" during his PhD dissertation.
- Jon Kabat-Zinn applied Buddhist meditation techniques in therapeutic and medical settings under the name of Mindfulness Meditation. However, Kabat-Zinn doesn't credit the original Buddhist sources, and instead called the techniques his "own" by mentioning that he had "developed" them himself. Malhotra claims that this was the commercial franchising of Vipassanā.

In Vivekananda's Ideas and the Two Revolutions in Western Thought (2013), Malhotra claims that Vivekananda has deeply influenced modern western thought, but that this influence in some cases remains unacknowledged and uncredited. Some examples Malhotra cites are William James and his work The Varieties of Religious Experience (1902); Aldous Huxley and his work The Perennial Philosophy (1945); and the notion of involution in the works of Ken Wilber, a term which Vivekananda probably took from western Theosophists, notably Helena Blavatsky, in addition to Darwin's notion of evolution, and possibly referring to the Samkhya term sātkarya. (Note: Theosophic ideas on involution have "much in common" with "theories of the descent of God in Gnosticism, Kabbalah, and other esoteric schools." According to Meera Nanda, "Vivekananda uses the word involution exactly how it appears in Theosophy: the descent, or the involvement, of divine cosnciousness into matter." With spirit, Vivekananda refers to prana or purusha, derived ("with some original twists") from Samkhya and classical yoga as presented by Patanjali in the Yoga Sutras. Wilber took the notion of involution from Sri Aurobindo, who may, or may not, have been influenced by Vivekananda's notion that "evolution presupposes a prior involution." Malhotra downplays contemporary academic scholarship which shows how western ideas such as Universalism, via Unitarian missionaries who collaborated with the Brahmo Samaj, themselves influenced Vivekananda.)

=== Criticism of Christian Yoga ===
Malhotra believes that the practice of a distorted version of Yoga, Christian Yoga, is not only inimical but also detrimental to Christianity's fundamental principles and doctrines. He supports his argument by specifically citing the theology of Christianity and Bible, and compares it to the philosophies of Yoga.

1. Yoga transcends all dogma and beliefs.
2. Yoga, meditation and Mantras cannot transcend the person, who believes in the historicity of Christianity and various events. Yogic path of embodied-knowing seeks to dissolve the historic ego, both individual and collective as false. Yoga is a do-it-yourself path that eliminates the need for intermediaries such as a priesthood or other institutional authority. Its emphasis on the body runs contrary to Christian beliefs that the body will lead humans astray. The ultimate goal is to move to a state of self-realization. (Note: Malhotra cites Biblical historicity, the apostle Paul was troubled by the clash between body and spirit, and wrote: "For in my inner being I delight in God's law; but I see another law at work in the members of my body, waging war against the law of my mind and making me a prisoner of the law of sin at work within my members. What a wretched man I am! Who will rescue me from this body of death?" (Romans 7:22-24). The effectiveness of the prayers and techniques thought by the Church depends on the particular circumstances of Jesus' history, however, this fundamentally contradicts the philosophies of Yoga.)
3. Yoga leads to unity consciousness i.e. no separation from God.
4. According to Vedanta, a being is not separate from God, we're a divine being ourselves and we're part of God and creation. However, this fundamental teaching of Yoga contradicts Christianity's beliefs that God and creation are separate entities. (Note: According to Christians, salvation depends on occurrences of three historical events: the incarnation, crucifixion, and resurrection of Jesus; and for Jews, it's Exodus. However, Dharmic traditions insists direct experience and empirical testing are important for the acquisition of knowledge, hence Yoga, and meditation are the tools for one to discover the truth in an endeavor that requires active inner and outer engagement. The focus is, therefore, on self-discipline, experimentation with techniques and adaptation of methods to different temperaments and life circumstances.)
5. Bible considers the silent mind to be dangerous.
6. According to Christianity, in prayer, the worshipper is supposed to be filled with Biblical passage, and the Nicene Creed diverts attention away from the state of silence, however, the whole practice of meditation in authentic Yoga system is to pursue the state of emptiness with refined focus to self-direct awareness to attain liberation, contrary to be filled with dogma. Yoga's self-centering silence is seen as resisting submission to an external God according to Christianity. (Note: Malhotra further mentions the critical distinction between Dharmic and Western reliance on history in the meditative practices. Dharmic traditions, remove the layers of conditioning that obfuscates one's true Self and the highest truth, while the West lacks both techniques and conceptual base to do so. According to Dharmic religions, states Malhotra, even if all the historical records were lost, historic memory erased, and even holy sites are destroyed, the ultimate truth could be recovered by any ordinary humans through spiritual practices. Malhotra's views were supported by the scholar Richard Lannoy, who states that "Contrary to Judeo-Christian or Islamic traditions, history has no metaphysical significance for either Hinduism or Buddhism. The highest the idea is jivan-mukta, one who liberates from Time. Man, according to Indian views, must, at all costs, find in this world a road that issues upon a trans-historical and a-temporal plane". He adds, Westerners who are keen to practice asanas, however, consider pranayama to be going too far in attempts to manipulate consciousness. Many Christian mystics were prosecuted in the past because of precisely fear that supernatural influences tied to Satan may enter in the silent mind.)
7. Christianity considers Mantras as 'prayer' to a pagan God, which violates a Commandment. (Note: Malhotra further clarifies that, when Christianity took over Europe, the idea is to evangelize people who worship the false gods, since the Church cannot establish the authority as long as the people are worshiping 'false gods'. However, Malhotra further states that a pop-culture Christian accepts Mantras, although orthodox Christians do not. Malhotra asserts that Mantras for transcendence is not accepted in Christianity and he further claims that any Christian theologians would agree to that.)
8. Although Mantras are neither mere prayer nor devotional songs to a God but a sacred utterance for transcendence, enlightenment and liberation, the usage of Mantras violates one of the Ten Commandments. Christianity neither accepts Mantras for transcendence nor accepts them as a prayer to 'One True God'. (Note: The practice of Mantra rejects the History-Centrism in the official doctrine of Catholicism, Eastern Orthodoxy, most Protestant churches, as well as the Anglican Communion, states Malhotra. Since the mantra is not sanctioned by the Bible or the Torah, it cannot be a prayer to One True God.)
9. Biblical cosmology subverts the Vedic principal of Rta.
10. Rta, in Hindu philosophy, is the fundamental fabric of reality and the principle of the natural order which regulates and coordinates the operation of the universe and everything within it. Conceptually, it's closely allied with Dharma, and the action of individuals in relation to those ordinances, referred to as Karma. However, this fundamentally contradicts the Nicene Creed.

Malhotra further mentions that practitioners of Christian Yoga and people who advocate it, neither understand Christianity nor the roots, complexity, and philosophies of Yoga. According to Shreena Gandhi, professor of Religious studies at Michigan State University, many American Yoga teachers do not learn about Hinduism, Indian culture and spiritual philosophies of Yoga. Thus, rarely do American teachers go much deeper than mere physical forms or Asanas, hence they dilute the true depth and philosophies of Yoga. Most Western Yoga teachers, states Malhotra, mention Pranayama, chanting Om or Asanas as health-related components of modern Yoga, yet this attitude is based, at best, in a shallow or lack of understanding of Yoga's Dharmic roots and philosophy.

The practice of Om as a sacred utterance is designed to dissolve Namarupa from the mind, that is the whole idea and the principle behind the Mantra. Its universality lies in its ability to transcend all particular historic contexts. The names 'Jesus', 'Allah', or 'Amen' are proper nouns laden with historic context and thus aren't a synonym for Mantras which have a specific transcendental context. Patanjali mentions Om as Vacakah or vibration of Ishvara, hence the experience it brings cannot be generated by an alternative sound such as the sound or names of other God. Yoga and Hinduism are deeply coupled, and renaming the original Sanskrit terms doesn't do any favor, since the actual physical practices, in the case of asanas remains the same, states Malhotra. Swami Param, head of the Classical Yoga Academy in Manahawkin, New Jersey, states that "If people can not acknowledge the Hindu elements and roots of Yoga, they should not bother studying it." He further adds, "As Hindus, we have no problem studying other religions, but we give them the respect they deserve."

Yoga's metaphysics centers around the quest to attain liberation from one's conditioning caused by the past Karma. Karma includes the baggage from prior lives, underscoring the importance of reincarnation. Malhotra points out that while it's "fashionable" for Westerners to say they believe in Karma and reincarnation, they have seldom worked out the contradictions with core Biblical doctrines. (Note: According to Karma, Adam and Eve's deeds would produce effects only on their individual future lives, and not to all their progeny and Infinitum. Karma is also not a sexually transmitted problem flowing from ancestors, states Malhotra.) Yogic liberation is therefore not contingent upon any unique historic events or interventions. Every individual's ultimate essence is Sat-Cit-Ananda, Originally Divine, and not Originally Sinful by birth. Malhotra indicates that this is a very fundamental contradiction of the doctrines of Original sin and Nicene Creed.

Malhotra further claims that Dharmic traditions are misunderstood by the West, one being the scholars conflated the use of Dharmic images and deities with pre-Christian Paganism, although Paganism is quite different from Dharmic bhakti. This suspicion of idolatry is one of the greatest obstacles which the Western practitioners of Yoga face, states Malhotra. The negative and erroneous association of Yoga with an idolatry of the body gives rise to odd hybrids such as Christian Yoga or Jewish Yoga or, Muslim Yoga, who claim to provide a cleaned-up Yoga, which is free from dangers of idolatry. He adds that internalized taboos, social prejudices, and all stereotypes of Dharmic culture and Hinduism in particular, act as a filter in the interpretation of Dharmic traditions, such as Yoga and meditation to create varied responses to Yoga.

Although few Christian Yoga or 'Secular' Yoga practitioners make baseless claims, states Malhotra, such as "Yoga doesn't belong to Hinduism" or "Yoga isn't Hindu", he asserts that, such people neither understands the philosophy of Yoga nor its relation to Hinduism. It's a fact of the matter that Yoga is one of the six major orthodox schools of Hinduism (Āstika), hence those preconceived claims are factually incorrect. Yoga, in Hinduism, is a way towards liberation from Saṃsāra and Duḥkha. (Note: In Judeo-Christian traditions, states Malhotra, the reliance on one or more historic events is crucial to the knowledge of God, to spiritual life, and to salvation. Revelation comes from a transcendent God who personally intervenes at a specific place, point in time, and set of circumstances to "save" mankind and offer the truth. Dharmic faiths, in contrast, do not depend on literal historic events in the same manner. They posit that truth can not only be found only externally but also within, by each person. Dharmic traditions, however, deal with their past through history, but through itihasa. Truth is not dependent or contingent upon history; rather, history is a manifestation of it, hence, the Dharmic relation with history is incomparable to that of the West. Because the study of itihasa is intended to bring about a change within and ultimately transcend space and time itself through Yoga, Dharmic religions by and large do not feel the pressure to present themselves as "history-centric", states Malhotra.)

Furthermore, Malhotra cites a survey research conducted by the Yoga practitioners in the West shows that those who attained a sense of self-directed awareness, are less likely to identify as "Christians" or any dogma based religions, and more likely identified to be with Dharmic religions such as, Buddhists, or, contrary to that as Spiritual but not religious. (Note: Malhotra mentions an example from the study that, Kristine, who grew up Catholic in Indiana, and tried Yoga for physical "stretches", but later practiced the spiritual aspects of it, now prefers Ashtanga's eight limbs over Christianity's Ten Commandments) Douglas R. Groothuis, professor of philosophy at Denver Seminary, says that "Yoga was a Hindu practice structured to help people attain a higher spiritual state within, and that is incompatible with Christian teachings", further he adds, "I don't think Christian Yoga works, It's an oxymoron".

=== Academic Hinduphobia: A Critique of Wendy Doniger's Erotic School of Indology ===
Several of Malhotra's essays from the early 2000s were re-published by Voice of India in 2016 in Academic Hinduphobia: A Critique of Wendy Doniger's Erotic School of Indology. The essays have been reportedly republished in the wake of the withdrawal of Doniger's The Hindus: An Alternative History from the Indian market, due to a lawsuit "alleging that it was biased and insulting to Hindus". The withdrawal led to extensive media attention and renewed sales in India. Malhotra claims that "the drama has diverted attention away from the substantive errors in her scholarship to be really about being an issue of censorship by radical Hindus", hence the republication of his critique of Wendy Doniger and scholars related to her.

=== Breaking India (2011) ===
Malhotra's book Breaking India: Western Interventions in Dravidian and Dalit Faultlines discusses three faultlines trying to destabilise India:

1. Islamic radicalism linked with Pakistan.
2. Maoists and Marxist radicals supported by China via intermediaries such as Nepal.
3. Dravidian and Dalit identity separatism being fostered by the West in the name of human rights. (Note: In the 20th century Dravidianist, Tamil nationalists, have developed an alternative narrative for the neo-Hindu narrative. According to Bryant, both groups have used colonial Indology to construct opposing narratives which "suited their practical purposes". Brahmins attacked Dravidianism, claiming Tamil to be an integral part of the Brahmin heritage.)

This book goes into greater depth on the third: the role of US and European churches, academics, think-tanks, foundations, government and human rights groups in fostering separation of the identities of Dravidian and Dalit communities from the rest of India.

=== Being Different (2011) ===
Being Different is a critique of the western-centric view on India characterised by Abrahamic traditions. Malhotra intends to give an Indian view on India and the west, as characterised by the Indian Dharmic traditions. Malhotra argues that there are irreconcilable differences between Dharmic traditions and Abrahamic religions. The term dharma:

... is used to indicate a family of spiritual traditions originating in India which today are manifested as Hinduism, Buddhism, Jainism and Sikhism. I explain that the variety of perspectives and practices of dharma display an underlying integral unity at the metaphysical level.

=== Indra's Net (2014) ===
Indra's Net is an appeal against the thesis of neo-Hinduism and a defense of Vivekananda's view of Yoga and Vedanta. The book argues for a unity, coherence, and continuity of the Yogic and Vedantic traditions of Hinduism and Hindu philosophy. It makes proposals for defending Hinduism from what the author considers to be unjust attacks from scholars, misguided public intellectuals, and hostile religious polemicists.

The book's central metaphor is "Indra's Net". According to Malhotra, as a scriptural image "Indra's Net" was first mentioned in the Atharva Veda (c. 1000 BCE). (Note: The Atharva Veda verse 8.8.6. says: "Vast indeed is the tactical net of great Indra, mighty of action and tempestuous of great speed. By that net, O Indra, pounce upon all the enemies so that none of the enemies may escape the arrest and punishment." And verse 8.8.8. says: "This great world is the power net of mighty Indra, greater than the great. By that Indra-net of boundless reach, I hold all those enemies with the dark cover of vision, mind and senses."Ram, Tulsi (2013). Atharva Veda: Authentic English Translation. Agniveer. pp. 910–911. Archived from the original on 30 March 2014.) According to Malhotra, in Buddhist philosophy, Indra's Net served as a metaphor in the Avatamsaka Sutra and was further developed by Huayen Buddhism to portray the interconnectedness of everything in the universe. Malhotra employs the metaphor of Indra's Net to express

the profound cosmology and outlook that permeates Hinduism. Indra's Net symbolizes the universe as a web of connections and interdependences [....] The net is said to be infinite, and to spread in all directions with no beginning or end. At each node of the net is a jewel, so arranged that every jewel reflects all the other jewels [....] a microcosm of the whole net [....] [and] individual jewels always remain in flux.

The book uses Indra's Net as a metaphor for the understanding of the universe as a web of connections and interdependences, an understanding which Malhotra wants to revive as the foundation for Vedic cosmology, a perspective that he asserts has "always been implicit" in the outlook of the ordinary Hindu.

According to Alexander Owen, the metaphor of Indra's Net is an orientalist invention, and Malhotra's "understanding of Indra's Net is reliant" on this Orientalist trope, exaggerating its significance in the Atharva Veda. According to Owens, "at the heart of Malhotra’s work is a western scholar’s construction of the Chinese Huayan account of the metaphor", attempting to "dismantle the orientalist perception of Hinduism by portraying the orientalist invention of a Vedic/Buddhist metaphor".

In July 2015, Richard Fox Young of Princeton Theological Seminary and Andrew J.Nicholson who authored Unifying Hinduism, alleged Malhotra plagiarized Unifying Hinduism in Indra's Net. (Note: Unifying Hinduism: Statements from the Author and from the Publisher) Nicholson further said that Malhotra not only had plagiarised his book, but also " twists the words and arguments of respectable scholars to suit his own ends." A revised edition was published in 2016 after these charges of plagiarism. The revised edition omits most references to the work of Andrew J. Nicholson and instead refers to the original Sanskrit sources. Malhotra says that Nicholson failed to attribute his ideas to the original sources and explains that the unity of Hinduism is inherent in the tradition from the times of its Vedic origins.

=== The Battle for Sanskrit (2016) ===
The Battle for Sanskrit is a critique of the American Indologist Sheldon Pollock. Malhotra pleads for traditional Indian scholars to write responses to Pollock's views, who takes a critical stance toward the role of Sanskrit in traditional views on Indian society. Malhotra is critical of Pollock's approach, and argues that western Indology scholars are deliberately intervening in Indian societies by offering analyses of Sanskrit texts which would be rejected by "traditional Indian experts".

=== Sanskrit Non-Translatables: The Importance of Sanskritizing English (2020) ===
Sanskrit Non-Translatables, a book by Malhotra published in 2020 and coauthored by Satyanarayana Dasa, deals with the idea of Sanskritizing the English language and enriching it with powerful Sanskrit words. It continues the discussion on the idea of non-translatability of Sanskrit, a concept first introduced in the book, Being Different.

The book discusses 54 non-translatables across various genres that are being commonly mis-translated. It empowers English speakers with the knowledge and arguments to introduce these Sanskrit words into their daily speech with confidence. For English readers, the book is the starting point of the movement to introduce loanwords into their English vocabulary without translation.

=== Snakes in the Ganga : Breaking India 2.0 ===
Published in 2022 as a sequel to Breaking India, with Vijaya Viswanatha as his co-author, Malhotra goes to great lengths to argue the existence of a Cultural Marxist-style conspiracy involved in perpetuating and normalizing anti-Hindu sentiments in Western academic and political discourse. He argues this is executed by the CCP, Saudi Wahhabi preachers and the World Economic Forum through the promotion of wokeism, mainly through a reinterpretation of Hindu-Muslim conflict in the lens of critical race theory. Within this framework, Hindus (especially Brahmins and other upper-caste groups) are equated with privileged white Americans, and thus subjected to systematic demonization in Western academic discourse while Hinduphobia and persecution of Hindus committed by Islamists (like the expulsion of Kashmiri Hindus and 2021 Bangladesh anti-Hindu violence) are tactically endorsed (through methods like subverting popular discourse in the direction of persecution of Muslims in India) and compared positively to the black liberation movement, while genuine protests made by Hindus against their targeted religious perscution are systematically silenced by labelling them as expression of Hindu fascism.

Malhotra names Harvard University alongside the Abdul Latif Jameel Poverty Action Lab and the Omidyar Network as the nucleus of Hinduphobic wokeism. He also alleges that Indian business conglomerates like the Piramal Group and Godrej Group, institutions like Azim Premji University and Ashoka University, and industrialists like Anand Mahindra and Lakshmi Mittal to be local collaborators in propagating wokeism-inspired Hinduphobia through systematic indoctrination of the Hindu youth. Furthermore, Malhotra argues that the Modi government's educational reforms have inadvertently aided in the spread of wokeism.

== Reception ==
=== Appreciation ===
Scholars have widely recognized that Malhotra has been influential in articulating diaspora and conservative dissatisfaction with the Western world's scholarly study of Hinduism. John Hinnells, a British scholar of comparative religions, considers Malhotra to lead a faction of Hindu criticism of methodology for the examination of Hinduism.

Other scholars welcome his attempt to challenge the western assumptions in the study of India and South Asia but also question his approach, finding it to be neglecting the differences within the various Indian traditions. In response, Malhotra points out that he does not state that all those traditions are essentially the same, that there is no effort to homogenise different Dharmic traditions, but that they share the assertion of integral unity.

Prema A. Kurien considers Malhotra to be at "the forefront of American Hindu effort to challenge the Eurocentrism in academia".

=== Criticism ===
Martha Nussbaum criticises Malhotra for "disregard for the usual canons of argument and scholarship, a postmodern power play in the guise of defense of tradition". Brian K. Pennington has called his work "ahistorical" and "a pastiche of widely accepted and overly simplified conclusions borrowed from the academy". Pennington has further charged that Malhotra systematically misrepresents the relationship between Hinduism and Christianity, arguing that in Malhotra's hands, "Christian and Indic traditions are reduced to mere cartoons of themselves." According to Jonathan Edelmann, one of the major problems with Malhotra's work is that he does not have a school of thought that he represents or is trained in. This fact undermines his claims to be engaged in purvapaksa debate. Purvapaksa debate requires location in a particular place of argument.

In May 2015, a Hindu-American scholar at St. Olaf College, Anantanand Rambachan, who studied three years with Swami Dayananda, published an extensive response to Malhotra's criticisms in Indra's Net. Rambachan claimed that Malhotra's "descriptions of my scholarship belong appropriately to the realm of fiction and are disconnected from reality". According to Rambachan, Malhotra's understanding and representation of classical Advaita is incorrect, attributing doctrines to Shankara and Swami Dayananda which are rejected by them. (Note: Rambachan: "Mr. Malhotra is, in reality, representing Swami Dayananda as teaching a version of what is known in the Advaita tradition as the doctrine of jñāna-karma-samuccaya, or the necessity of combining ritual action and knowledge for liberation. Śaṅkara decisively rejects this and so does Swami Dayananda Saraswati." See also advaita-vedanta.org, [Advaita-l] jnana karma samuccaya.) Malhotra's epistemological foundations have also been critically questioned by Anantanand Rambachan. He does not, according to Rambachan, situate his discussion in relation to classical epistemologies or clarify his differences with these.

Malhotra's critiques on Wendy Doniger's Freudian psychoanalytic interpretations of Hinduism in her academic works, have "led to verbal and physical attacks on western scholars and their institutions."

Malhotra claimed on social media in August 2020 that he spoke out against Wikipedia in the 1990s in a talk in Auroville that was posted in their magazine, when the portal sought Indian users for donations. Wikipedia, on the other hand, was founded in 2001. Malhotra's claims were criticized on social media.

In November 2022, Google cancelled Malhotra's talk at its headquarters after receiving complaints about his views on homosexuality and Islam. A day after cancelling his talk, Google introduced rules for inviting guest speakers to its offices.

=== Allegations of plagiarism ===
In July 2015, Richard Fox Young of Princeton Theological Seminary (Note: Young is the Elmer K. and Ethel R. Timby Associate Professor of the History of Religions at Princeton Theological Seminary. He has authored and edited books on Christianity and Christian conversion in India and elsewhere in Asia. Young's books include "Asia in the making of Christianity: Conversion, Agency, and Indigeneity, 1600s to the Present" (2013, OCLC 855706908), "Constructing Indian Christianities: Culture, Conversion and Caste" (2014, OCLC 900648811), "Perspectives on Christianity in Korea and Japan: the Gospel and culture in East Asia" (1995, OCLC 33101519) and "Resistant Hinduism: Sanskrit sources on anti-Christian Apologetics in Early Nineteenth-Century India" (1981, OCLC 8693222).) (Note: Young studied Malhotra's work for an essay published in 2014. See: Young (2014), Studied Silences? Diasporic Nationalism, 'Kshatriya Intellectuals' and the Hindu American Critique of Dalit Christianity's Indianness. In: Constructing Indian Christianities: Culture, Conversion and Caste chapter 10) (Note: Young gave an explanation for his allegations in an open letter to his colleagues at Princeton Theological Seminary, where he is currently employed. See a letter from Fox to his colleagues. Malhotra comments on his references to Nicholson at Swarajya magazine, "Nicholson's Untruths", while "Independent Readers and Reviewers" respond at "Rebuttal of false allegations against Hindu scholarship".) and Andrew J.Nicholson who authored Unifying Hinduism, alleged Malhotra had plagiarized Unifying Hinduism in Indra's Net. Nicholson further said that Malhotra not only had plagiarised his book, but also "twists the words and arguments of respectable scholars to suit his own ends". (Note: Nicholson refers to page 163 of Indra's Net, which copies p. 14 of Unifying Hinduism: Malhotra Indra's Net p. 163: "Vivekananda's challenge was also to show that this complementarity model was superior to models that emphasized conflict and contradiction. He showed great philosophical and interpretive ingenuity, even to those who might not agree with all his conclusions. [19]"; Nicholson Unifying Hinduism (2010) p. 14: "Vijnanabhikshu's challenge is to show that the complementary model he espouses is superior to other models emphasizing conflict and contradiction. Even his distractors must admit that he often shows extraordianry philosophical and interpretive ingenuity, whether or not all his arguments to this end are ultimately persuasive."; Malhotra's note 19 refers to "Nicholson 2010, pp. 65, 78", not to p. 14. None of these pages mentions Vivekananda.) Permanent Black, publisher of Nicholson's Unifying Hinduism, stated that they would welcome HarperCollins' "willingness to rectify future editions" of Indra's Net.

In response to Nicholson, Malhotra stated "I used your work with explicit references 30 times in Indra's Net, hence there was no ill-intention", and cited a list of these references. He announced that he would be eliminating all references to Nicholson and further explained: (Note: So far, Malhotra has given seven responses: "Rajiv Malhotra says those accusing him of plagiarism are really out to silence his voice", Rajiv Malhotra on Hindu Intellectuals; "Rajiv Malhotra has a rejoinder to Andrew Nicholson"; Swarajya magazine, "Nicholson's Untruths"; "Decolonising Indology: Rajiv Malhotra on why he won't follow rules set by the West"; "Rajiv Malhotra's Indra's Net: Seven big ideas and Hinduism's integral unity"; "Statement by the editor of Indra's Net, based in Toronto, Canada")

I am going to actually remove many of the references to your work simply because you have borrowed from Indian sources and called them your own original ideas [...] Right now, it is western Indologists like you who get to define 'critical editions' of our texts and become the primary source and adhikari. This must end and I have been fighting this for 25 years [...] we ought to examine where you got your materials from, and to what extent you failed to acknowledge Indian sources, both written and oral, with the same weight with which you expect me to do so.

Malhotra published a rebuttal and stated that he had removed all references to Nicholson's works in chapter 8 of Indra's Net, replacing them with references to the original Indian sources.

== Publications ==
=== Books ===
- Breaking India: Western Interventions in Dravidian and Dalit Faultlines (2011) (publisher: Amaryllis, An imprint of Manjul Publishing House Pvt. Ltd.; ISBN 978-8191067378).
- Rajiv Malhotra (2011), Being Different: An Indian Challenge to Western Universalism (publisher: HarperCollins India; ISBN 978-9-350-29190-0).
- Rajiv Malhotra (2014), Indra's Net: Defending Hinduism's Philosophical Unity (publisher: HarperCollins India; ISBN 978-9-351-36244-9).
- Rajiv Malhotra (2016), Battle for Sanskrit: Dead or Alive, Oppressive or Liberating, Political or Sacred? (publisher: HarperCollins India; ISBN 978-9351775386).
- Rajiv Malhotra and Satyanarayana Dasa Babaji (2020), Sanskrit Non-Translatables: The Importance of Sanskritizing English (publisher: Amaryllis, An imprint of Manjul Publishing House Pvt. Ltd.; ISBN 978-93-90085-48-4).
- Rajiv Malhotra and Vijaya Viswanathan (2022), Snakes in the Ganga: Breaking India 2.0, (publisher: Occam, An imprint of BluOne Ink, LLP; ISBN 978-93-92209-09-3

=== Other publications ===
- Malhotra, Rajiv (2009). "American Exceptionalism and the Myth of the Frontiers". In Rajani Kannepalli Kanth (ed.). The Challenge of Eurocentrism: Global Perspectives, Policy, and Prospects. Palgrave Macmillan. ISBN 978-0-230-61227-3.
- Antonio de Nicolas, Krishnan Ramaswamy, and Aditi Banerjee (eds.) (2007), Invading the Sacred: An Analysis Of Hinduism Studies In America (publisher: Rupa & Co.)

== See also ==
- François Gautier
- Madhu Kishwar
- Arun Shourie
- Kali's Child
- Anantanand Rambachan
- Postcolonialism
- Orientalism
- Occidentalism
- Anti-Western sentiment
- Islamoleftism

== Sources ==
=== Printed sources ===
- Bloch, Esther (2010), Rethinking Religion in India: The Colonial Construction of Hinduism, Routledge, ISBN 978-0-415-54890-8
- Bryant, Edwin; Patton, Laurie (2013), The Indo-Aryan Controversy: Evidence and Inference in Indian History, Routledge
- Campbell, James T. (2007), Race, Nation, and Empire in American History, The University of North Carolina Press, ISBN 9781442994102
- Doniger, Wendy (2009), The Hindus: An Alternative History, New York: Penguin
- Edelmann, Jonathan (2013), "Becoming Different: Why Education is Required for Responding to Globalism Dharmically", Journal of Hindu-Christian Studies, 26: 17–27, doi:10.7825/2164-6279.1544
- Halbfass, Wilhelm (1995), Philology and Confrontation: Paul Hacker on Traditional and Modern Vedānta, SUNY Press
- Heehs, Peter (2020), "Sri Aurobindo's Theory of Spiritual Evolution", in Mackenzie Brown, C. (ed.), Asian Religious Responses to Darwinism: Evolutionary Theories in Middle Eastern, South Asian, and East Asian Cultural Contexts, Springer Nature
- Hinnells, John R. (2010), The Routledge companion to the study of religion, Taylor & Francis, ISBN 978-0-415-47328-6
- Jones, Ken H. (2003), The New Social Face of Buddhism: A Call to Action, Wisdom Publications, ISBN 978-0-86171-365-3
- King, Richard (1999), "Orientalism and the modern myth of "Hinduism"", NUMEN, 46 (2): 146–185, doi:10.1163/1568527991517950
- King, Richard (2002), Orientalism and Religion: Post-Colonial Theory, India and "The Mystic East", Routledge
- Kipf, David (1979), The Brahmo Samaj and the shaping of the modern Indian mind, Atlantic Publishers & Distri
- Kurien, Prema A. (2007), A place at the multicultural table: the development of an American Hinduism, Rutgers University Press, ISBN 978-0-8135-4056-6
- Larson, Gerald James (December 2012), "The Issue of Not Being Different Enough: Some Reflections on Rajiv Malhotra's Being Different" (PDF), International Journal of Hindu Studies, 16 (3): 311–322, doi:10.1007/s11407-012-9129-8, S2CID 144728948
- Malhotra, Rajiv (2011a), Being Different: An Indian Challenge to Western Universalism, HarperCollins India, ISBN 978-9-350-29190-0
- Malhotra, Rajiv. (December 2012a), "Author's Response: The Question of Dharmic Coherence", International Journal of Hindu Studies, 16 (3): 369–408, doi:10.1007/s11407-012-9132-0
- Malhotra, Rajiv (2013), Vivekananda's Ideas and the Two Revolutions in Western Thought. In: Vivekananda as the Turning Point. The Rise of a New Spiritual Wave. pp. 559-583 (PDF), Advaita Ashrama
- Malhotra, Rajiv (2014), Indra's Net: Defending Hinduism's Philosophical Unity, Noida, India: HarperCollins Publishers India, ISBN 978-9351362449, OCLC 871215576
- Malhotra, Rajiv (2016). The Battle for Sanskrit: Is Sanskrit Political or Sacred, Oppressive or Liberating, Dead or Alive?. Harper Collins. ISBN 978-93-5177-539-3.
- Mittal, Sushil (2006). Religions of South Asia: an introduction. Gene R. Thursby. Routledge.
- Nanda, Meera (2010), "Madame Blavatsky's Children: Modern Hindu Encounters with Darwinism", in Lewis, James R.; Hammer, Olav (eds.), Handbook of Religion and the Authority of Science, Brill
- Nicholson, Andrew J. (2010). Unifying Hinduism: Philosophy and Identity in Indian Intellectual History. Columbia University Press. ISBN 978-0-231-14986-0.
- Nussbaum, Martha C. (2009). The Clash Within: Democracy, Religious Violence, and India's Future. Harvard University Press. ISBN 978-0-674-03059-6.
- Odin, Steve (1982), Process Metaphysics and Hua-Yen Buddhism: A Critical Study of Cumulative Penetration Vs. Interpenetration, SUNY Press, ISBN 978-0-87395-568-3
- Pennington, Brian K. (2013), "The Pitfalls of Trying to Be Different", Journal of Hindu-Christian Studies, 26: 10–16, doi:10.7825/2164-6279.1543
- Prothero, Stephen (2006), A Nation of Religions: The Politics of Pluralism in Multireligious America, The University of North Carolina Press, ISBN 978-0-8078-5770-0
- Rambachan, Anatanand (1994), The Limits of Scripture: Vivekananda's Reinterpretation of the Vedas, University of Hawaii Press
- Rambachan, Anantanand (2013), "The Traditional Roots of Difference", Journal of Hindu-Christian Studies, 26: 2–9, doi:10.7825/2164-6279.1542
- Rinehart, Robin (2004), Contemporary Hinduism: ritual, culture, and practice, ABC-CLIO
- Rosser, Yvette C. (2007), "University of Chicago Magazine: Obscuring the Issues", in Krishnan, Ramaswamy; de Nicolas, Antonio; Banerjee, Aditi (eds.), Invading the Sacred: an Analysis of Hinduism Studies in America, New Delhi: Rupa & Co., pp. 378–396, ISBN 9788129111821
- Tilak, Shrinivas (2012). "Differing Worldviews (Western and Dharmic) in Rajiv Malhotra's Being Different". International Journal of Hindu Studies. 16 (3): 287–310. doi:10.1007/s11407-012-9130-2. ISSN 1022-4556. S2CID 143869600.
- Taylor, McComas (2011), "Mythology Wars: The Indian Diaspora, Wendy's Children and the Struggle for the Hindu Past" (PDF), Asian Studies Review, 35 (2): 149–168, doi:10.1080/10357823.2011.575206, S2CID 145317607
- Thurman, Robert (2004), The Universal Vehicle Discourse Literature: Mahāyānasūtrālaṁkāra, New York: Columbia University Press, ISBN 978-0-9753734-0-8
- Wilberg, Peter (April 2008). Heidegger, Phenomenology and Indian Thought. New Gnosis Publications. ISBN 978-1-904519-08-9.
- Yelle, Robert A. (December 2012), "Comparative Religion as Cultural Combat: Occidentalism and Relativism in Rajiv Malhotra's Being Different", International Journal of Hindu Studies, 16 (3): 335–348, doi:10.1007/s11407-012-9133-z, S2CID 144950049
