= Invading the Sacred =

2007 book on Hindu Studies

Invading the Sacred: An Analysis of Hinduism Studies in America
- Author: Krishnan Ramaswamy; Antonio de Nicolas; Aditi BanerjeeF
- Language: English
- Publisher: Rupa & Co.
- Publication date: 2007
- Publication place: India
- Pages: 545
- ISBN: 978-81-291-1182-1
- OCLC: 162522146

Invading the Sacred: An Analysis of Hinduism Studies in America is a book published in 2007 by Rupa & Co. which argues that there are factual inaccuracies in Hindu studies. The editors of the book are Krishnan Ramaswamy, Antonio T. de Nicolás, and Aditi Banerjee. The book has contributions from Arvind Sharma of McGill University, S. N. Balagangadhara of Ghent University, psychoanalyst Alan Roland, Yvette Rosser, Ramesh N. Rao, Pandita Indrani Rampersad, Yuvraj Krishnan, and others. Rajiv Malhotra played a large role in drafting most of the book's content. He stated that through this book, he intended to bring attention to, and provide a counter-argument to, the prevalent Freudian psychoanalytical critiques of Hinduism in the American Academy of Religion's RISA group. After the controversy surrounding Wendy Doniger's book The Hindus: An Alternative History erupted in India, the authors decided to make it freely available online as it critiques a major part of her work.

== Documenting protests and disputed studies ==
The book documents essays, critiques and surveys of western scholarship on religions and traditions in India. The book also contains critiques of European ideas as applied to Indian culture. The last sections chronicles how key academic establishments in United States have responded. The book documents protests that are not only of cognitive or factual basis but also often about interpretations. Critics of academics claim bias or gross errors in some aspects. The book also disputes the studies by Wendy Doniger, Jeffery Kripal and Paul Courtright. It also critiques the efficacy of the excessive use of Freudian psychoanalysis in hermeneutics which some of these studies rely on.

== Reception and reviews ==
Invading the Sacred was positively received by Daily News and Analysis, as well as the Hindustan Times. According to Balakrishna, writing for FirstPost.com India, the book "is perhaps one of the most definitive works that aid our understanding of the exact state of affairs in Indology in the US academia in general and the scholarship of the likes of Wendy Doniger in particular," in addition to Rajiv Malhotra's pioneering criticisms.

=== Anantanand Rambachan - International Journal of Hindu Studies ===
Anantanand Rambachan reviewed the book for the International Journal of Hindu Studies. Rambachan notes the concerns of American Hindus with perceived negative portrayals of Hinduism and the consequent fear of disregard for Hindu practitioners. A major concern is the Freudianization of the parlance of Indology. Rambachan acknowledges the need to take care of these concerns, but also notes that Hinduism should not be overly idealized:

Rambachan also notes that most scholars are deeply committed to an honest study of Hinduism, and that their work "sustains an interest in the academic study of Hinduism that is unmatched elsewhere in the world." According to Rambachan, there is a tension "between those who study religion in this way and the needs of [the] faithful," but the task of the academia is not "the formation and nurturing of the Hindu faith in a new generation of Hindus." According to Rambachan, "Hindus in the United States must work vigorously to build institutions and offer opportunities to young Hindus where Hindu identity is meaningfully cultivated and encouraged."

=== Rahul Peter Das - Orientalistische Literaturzeitung ===
Rahul Peter Das wrote an extensive review in the Orientalistische Literaturzeitung. Das also notes that the main concern is with "Freudian, often vividly sexual, interpretations." According to Das, "particular attention is paid to Doniger's sexualisation of mythology, Kripal's portrayal of Ramakrishna (Rām'kṛṣṇa) as homoerotic, and Courtright's sexual interpretation of Gaṇeśa." According to Das, criticism of "Freudian psychoanalysis as a surrogate religion" are as old as psycho-analysis itself, and the criticism of Invading the Sacred is therefore not surprising. In critique of the book, Das notes a "failure to distinguish properly between academia and public life outside this." Das further notes that

... there are clearly many Hindus, in the USA or South Asia, who do not condemn the methods and findings of those criticised in this book, which means that either the claim of Invading the Sacred to be speaking for Hindus as such has to be retracted, or else such Hindus have to be denied their authenticity, maybe even their Hinduness.

Das also notes a lack of academic qualifications, and a lack of scholarly rigor, by the authors of Invading the Sacred. He raises concerns with the author's inability to use primary materials:

we find recourse not to the evaluation of the original primary reference material, but only to translations, and even these sparingly. The main discussion takes place on a secondary or even tertiary plane and even that on the basis of a rather limited referential basis.

Das further notes that "[n]ot only sound analysis of primary sources, but adequate consideration of secondary sources too is essential. Here too the publication has serious deficiencies." Das also notes that "no real epistemological and categorical discussion takes place at all," and that there is a " lack of categorical rigour." And he notes that the authors seem to be unknown with the broader field of Indological studies:

... the very academics in North America who would a priori be expected to be regarded as the principal authorities on textbased studies on Hinduism ... and their works are passed over in silence, which is truly amazing considering the wealth of philological South Asia related competence in North American universities. This shows a serious lack of knowledge and comprehension about academic text based studies related to Hinduism in this region of the world, and is a major flaw in this book. To me, it demonstrates a lack of serious study of the academic structures being criticised, invalidating many of the pronouncements on Hinduism Studies in America as such.

A further critique is the homogenisation of "Hinduism", which "some see as typical for diasporic communities."

Das concludes with the notion that "this publication ushers in a new era, that the forces it unleashes will remain active and gain strength ... it will probably lead to a long-term process impacting the study of Hinduism in the USA," and notes that the real debate should not be a political debate, but a debate on the one-sidedness of text-based Indological studies.

== See also ==
- Hindu American Foundation
- Being Different
- Breaking India
- Hinduism Invades America
- Indra's Net
- Kali's Child
