= Being Different =

Book by Rajiv Malhotra

Being Different: An Indian Challenge to Western Universalism
- Author: Rajiv Malhotra
- Language: English
- Published: 2011, HarperCollins Publishers India a joint venture with The India Today Group
- Publication place: India
- Pages: 474
- ISBN: 978-9350291900
- OCLC: 769101673
- Website: beingdifferentbook.com

Being Different: An Indian Challenge to Western Universalism is a 2011 book by Rajiv Malhotra, an Indian-American author, philanthropist and public speaker, published by HarperCollins. The book attempts to study Western cultures from the vantage point of Indian philosophy, specifically through what he refers to as “traditional dharmic approach.”

The primary objective of this book is to challenge the postulations of Western societies on the Indic civilization.

== About the book ==
Malhotra intends to give a critique of western culture, by comparing it with Indian culture, as seen from a 'Dharmic point of view.' To accomplish this goal, he postulates a set of characteristics of western culture, and a set of characteristics of Indian culture and religion, characterised as "Dharmic." Malhotra explains that in Being Different,

'Dharma' is used to indicate a family of spiritual traditions originating in India which today are manifested as Hinduism, Buddhism, Jainism and Sikhism. I explain that the variety of perspectives and practices of dharma display an underlying integral unity at the metaphysical level.

Malhotra summarizes his rationale for treating Dharmic traditions as a family, contrasting the family of Dharmic traditions with Abrahamic religions. He constructs their differences from this 'Dharmic perspective,' thereby 'reversing the gaze.' Malhotra clarifies that he is not replacing a West-centric view with a Dharma-centric view by proposing the reversal of gaze. Malhotra explains that he seeks a dialogue, where the world civilizations are not merely seen from the viewpoint of the West, but the west is also seen from a non-western, c.q. 'dharmic' point of view.

Malhotra calls for mutual respect as a higher standard for pluralism than tolerance. Mutual respect does not call for acceptance of beliefs held by others, only to have genuine respect for difference, because, beliefs are not facts. Malhotra explains why this gaze from the other side benefits the West, explaining that he

... hopes to set the terms for a deeper and more informed engagement between dharmic and Western civilizations."

== Overview ==
Malhotra identifies "six distinct and fundamental points of divergence between the dharmic traditions and the West." (Note: beingdifferentbook.com, Synopsis) Malhotra argues that understanding these six points of divergence is crucial to recognizing the fallacy of facile sameness arguments and to understanding senselessness of inculturation efforts. These points of divergence are:

1. Approaches to difference
2. History-centrism versus inner sciences
3. Integral versus synthetic unity
4. The nature of chaos and uncertainty
5. Translatability vs. Sanskrit
6. Western universalism challenged

=== Divergence 1: Approaches to difference ===
According to Malhotra, there is a pervasive anxiety in the west over personal and cultural differences. Therefore, the west tries to assimilate and convert "all that does not fit its fundamental paradigms." According to Malhotra, this anxiety is grounded in schisms which are inherent in the western worldview. In contrast, "Dharmic traditions [...] are historically more comfortable with differences."

=== Divergence 2: History Centrism versus inner sciences ===
According to Malhotra, Dharmic traditions rely on adhyatma-vidya, (Note: "Sciences of spirituality," (Note: Encyclopædia Britannica, Adhyatmavidya) "True, Genuine and Authentic Spiritual Knowledge." (Note: adhyatmavidya.com)) while the Abrahamic religions rely on God's interventions in human history. For followers of history-centric (Abrahamic) religions, truth-claims based on history are more significant than the scriptural message itself. History-centric dogma such as original sin and resurrection become critical beliefs and no compromise can be made on their acceptance. This explains the centrality of Nicene creed to all major Christian denominations. Followers of history-centric religions believe that the God revealed His message through a special prophet and that the message is secured in scriptures. This special access to God is available only to these intermediaries or prophets and not to any other human beings.

Dharma traditions do not hold history central to their faith. Gautama Buddha emphasized that his enlightenment was merely a discovery of a reality that is always there. He was not bringing any new covenants from any God. The history of the Buddha is not necessary for Buddhist principles to work. In fact, Buddha stated that he was neither the first nor the last person to have achieved the state of enlightenment. He also asserted that he was not God nor sent by any God as a prophet, and whatever he discovered was available to every human to discover for himself. This makes Buddhism not History-Centric.

Malhotra explains how history-centrism or lack of it has implications for religious absolutist exclusivity vs. flexible pluralism:

Abrahamic religions claim that we can resolve the human condition only by following the lineage of prophets arising from the Middle East. All other teachings and practices are required to be reconciled with this special and peculiar history. By contrast, the dharmic traditions – Hinduism, Buddhism, Jainism and Sikhism -- do not rely on history in the same absolutist and exclusive way. This dharmic flexibility has made fundamental pluralism possible which cannot occur within the constraints of history centrism, at least as understood so far.

=== Divergence 3: Integral versus synthetic unity ===
Both Western and Dharmic civilizations have cherished unity as an ideal, but with a different emphasis. Here, Malhotra posits a crucial distinction between what he considers a "synthetic unity" that gave rise to a static intellectualistic Worldview in the West positioning itself as the Universal and an "integrative unity" that gave rise to a dynamically oriented Worldview based on Dharma. While the former is characterized by a "top-down" essentialism embracing everything a priori, the latter is a "bottom-up" approach acknowledging the dependent co-origination of alternative views of the human and the divine, the body and the mind, and the self and society.

=== Divergence 4: The nature of chaos and uncertainty ===
Dharma philosophical systems are highly systematized in their approach to understanding ultimate reality and in carefully addressing what one can know through various means of knowledge. However, this rigor does not restrict their freedom in being comfortable with social organization. Indians exhibit remarkable openness to self-organization and decentralization. Malhotra explains the basis for this openness:

Hinduism weaves multiple narratives around the central motif of cooperative rivalry between order (personified as devas) and chaos (personified as asuras). A key myth shared by all the dharma traditions – the 'churning of the milky ocean,' or samudra-manthan – shows the eternal struggle between two poles. The milky ocean is the ocean of consciousness and creativity, which is to be churned in order to obtain amrita, or the nectar of eternal life."

Dharma actually recognises the need for both Order and Chaos to co-exist in the universe. In the story Prajapati attempts to create the Universe keeping Order and Chaos in dynamic balance. His initial attempts fail because they're too Jami/homogenous or too Prthak/different. Finally he gets the combination just-right by using the principle of Bandhuta/Bandhu i.e. binding together dissimilar things by what is common across all things in the entire creation.

=== Divergence 5: Translatability vs. Sanskrit ===
Malhotra identifies various non-translatables in Sanskrit that have been mapped into Abrahamic religious concepts. These mis-translations then are used to draw sameness arguments or to denounce Hinduism. Malhotra explains that

In the fashionable search for sameness in all religions, Holy Spirit in Christianity is often equated with Shakti or kundalini in Hinduism. However, these terms represent different, even incompatible cosmologies. Christianity assumes an inherent dualism between God and creation. This necessitates historical revelations along with prophets, priests and institutions to bring us the truth. But Shakti, being all-pervading, obviates dependence on these; its experience can be discovered by going within through yoga.

Malhotra gives example of a list of Sanskrit non-translatables and goes on to provide key differences in their original meaning and the most common translated word in English. For example,

Sr. No.	Sanskrit non-translatable	Most common English translation
1	Brahman and Ishwara	God
2	Shiva	Destroyer
3	Atman	Soul or Spirit
4	Veda	Bible or Gospel
5	Dharma	Religion or Law
6	Jāti and Varna	Caste
7	Aum	Amen, Allah etc.
8	Dukkha	Suffering
9	Avatar	Jesus
10	Shakti or Kundalini	Holy Spirit
11	Rishi, Guru or Yogi	Prophet or Christian Saint
12	Devatas	Pagan Gods
13	Murtis	Idols
14	Yajna	Christian Sacrifice
15	Karma	Western Notion of Suffering
16	Karma	Redemption
17	Karma-Yoga	Christian Works
18	Jivanmukti or Moksha	Salvation

=== Divergence 6: Western universalism challenged ===
Malhotra claims that refuting Western Universalism is one of the most important objectives of his book, the conscious effort from American and European individuals to make the rest of the world fit into the template provided by these civilizations. He claims that all people and culture are forced into the various schemes put forward to bring this about and asserts that modern laws, regulation, conventions and common practices are formed, whether consciously or not with Western Universalism in mind.

Malhotra then goes on to provide a case study of Germany for Western digestion and synthesis. He claims that late 18th and early 19th century saw a special interest in ancient India in European academia now called as Romantic movement and Indic origin of European culture started to compete with the earlier held Semitic origin. To satisfy German cultural and religious egotistic interests various German Romantic thinkers like K. W. F. Schlegel and G. W. F. Hegel slowly digested Indic ideas, like monism, and presented a caricature of India as the 'frozen other'. Malhotra says Hegel presented, "The Weltgeist or World Spirit is, in effect the protagonist of this history, and the West is extraordinary because it is destined to lead this journey while all other civilizations must follow or perish." He claims this narrative gave the West its privileges and those who doesn't fit into this scheme are not a part of history, even though the Spirit may use (parts of) them. Malhotra alleges "He (Hegel) laboriously criticizes Sanskrit and Indian civilization, arguing with European Indologists with the aim of assimilating some ideas (such as absolute idealism) into his own philosophy) while postulating India as the inferior other in order to construct his theory of the West. Asia's place in history is as an infant, whereas the West is mature and everyone's eventual destination." This argument led to justification of colonialism as a teleological imperative by which the superior Europeans must appropriate others. For example, Hegel argues it is better for Africans to remain enslaved until they pass through a process of maturation that culminates in their total conversion to Christianity. Hegel regarded colonization as India's inevitable fate and was declared 'static' and incapable of progress by itself, and it was up to the West to colonize and 'operate' on her for her own benefit. Hegel's perception of India as stagnant and lacking history was perpetuated by Karl Marx, who described India as caught in the 'Asiatic Mode of Production'. Hegel writes, 'The Germanic Spirit (germanische Geist) is the Spirit of the New World (neuen Welt), whose end is the realization of the absolute truth... The destiny of the Germanic people is that of serving as the bearer of the Christian principle'. Thus Hegel establishes that while the West is pure, some westerners (Germans) are purer than others. As Halbfass explains, 'European thought has to provide the context and categories for the exploration of all traditions of thought', which Malhotra argues sees the digestion of Indian civilization into Western categories as both natural and desirable. Malhotra also writes that, after Hegel's death his sweeping Eurocentric accounts of history was extrapolated which culminates at the Aryan identity. Malhtora states,

Hegel's theory of history has led to liberal Western supremacy, which hides behind the notion of providing the 'universals'. These European Enlightenment presuppositions became incorporated in the confluence of academic philosophy, philology, social theories and 'scientific' methodologies – all of which were driven by various imperial and colonial values alongside Christian theology.

== Reception ==
Several reviews of Being Different have been published in academic periodicals, that include reviews by Campbell, Wiebe, Rai, and Rukmani. A special issue of the International Journal of Hindu Studies was dedicated to discussing Being Different, and included articles by Nicholas F. Gier, Shrinivas Tilak, Gerald James Larson, Rita M. Gross, Robert A. Yelle, and Cleo McNelly Kearns, as well as a nearly 40-page response by Malhotra. (Note: The publisher of Being Different also quotes comments about the book from John M. Hobson, Francis X. Clooney, D. R. Sardesai, Don Wiebe, Makarand R. Paranjape, Kapila Vatsyayan, Satya Narayan Das, Rita Sherma, Sampadananda Mishra, and others. (Note: Being Different website (accessed 8 April 2013)) In addition to appearing on the book website, quotes appear in the opening pages, in a section entitled "Praise for the Book" that precedes the title page, from Gerald James Larson, Don Wiebe, Makarand R. Paranjape, Cleo Kearns, Kapila Vatsyayan, Satya Narayan Das, Shrinivas Tilak, Rita Sherma, and Sampadananda Mishra.)

In February 2012, Patheos Book Club hosted a discussion of Being Different on their website.

=== International Journal of Hindu Studies ===
==== Cleo McNelly Kearns ====
According to Kearns, Malhotra puts forward a valuable challenge to Christian theology. She also notes that Malhotra himself adds to the "binary thinking" which he rejects.

==== Rita M. Gross ====
According to Rita Gross, Malhotra has located "one of the most urgent tasks for human survival", namely the ability to accommodate diversity without judging one culture over another as superior or inferior.

==== Shrinivas Tilak ====
Tilak is appreciative of the "counterreading" that Malhotra offers. According to Tilak, Malhotra "gives voice to Indic subjects who have been silenced or transformed by nineteenth century and contemporary Indological filters. Tilak uses the term Dharmacatuskam, "House of Dharma with Its Four Wings (Dharmas)", to denote the sense of integration that underlies the Hinduism, Buddhism, Jainism and Sikhism traditions. Tilak points out that Hinduism, Buddhism, Jainism and Sikhism offer various approaches to dharma, which are "not unitary but composite".

==== Gerald James Larson ====
Gerald James Larson is critical of Malhotra's presentation of "differences". According to Larson, Malhotra ignores the differences, to arrive at an "integral unity" "that is little more than a Neo-Vedanta or Neo-Hindu reading of the Bhagavad Gita documented with numerous citations from Aurobindo." Larson calls this the "Brahmin imaginary", (Note: Doniger: "It is often convenient to speak of a Brahmin-oriented quasi-orthodoxy (or ortho-praxy [...]), which we might call the Brahmin imaginary or the idealized system of class and life stage (varna-ashrama-dharma). but whatever we call this constructed center, it is, like the empty center in the Zen diagram of Hinduisms, simply an imaginary point around which we orient all the actual Hindus who accept or oppose it; it is what Indian logicians call the straw man (purva paksha), against whom argues. The actual beliefs and practices of Hindus – renunciation, devotion, sacrifice, and so many more – are peripheries that the imaginary Brahmin center cannot hold.) the standard Brahmanical view of Indic religion and philosophy in its Neo-Hindu understanding. According to Larson, the "Brahmin imaginary" is an imagined "integral unity" that is adhered to only by a cultural elite, with very little reality "on the ground", as it were, throughout the centuries of cultural development in the South Asian region. Larson also criticises the use of the term "Dharma traditions" or "dharmic systems", which ignores the differences between the various Indian religions. Larson ends his review with the recommendation to move toward a future in which "being different" really reflects the "differences' in Indic religion and thought, "in a manner that challenges but also learns from the ongoing interactions with "the West.""

==== Robert A. Yelle ====
Robert A. Yelle is highly critical of Malhotra's approach. According to Yelle, "there is little, if any, original scholarship in the book. It is the work of a polemicist," who uses western scholarship when criticizing the West, but ignores this scholarship when he presents his own nativist vision of "dharmic traditions." According to Yelle, Malhotra's vision is a mirror image of Orientalism, namely Occidentalism. Robert A. Yelle also criticises Malhotra for his use of the term "dharmic traditions". According to Yelle, Malhotra ignores the differences that exist among and within the various traditions of India. According to Yelle, Malhotra presents a thoroughly homogenized ideal of Hinduism, based on a limited choice of aspects from Vedanta philosophy and Yoga. Yelle ends his review with the remark that there has been a gradual improvement in Western scholars' knowledge of Indian traditions. To come to a real dialogue, Indians must also be willing to look in the mirror, and be open to self-criticism.

==== Nicholas F. Gier ====
Gier criticizes Malhotra for ignoring profound differences between Dharmic traditions in seeing an integral unity. Gier notices that Malhotra himself admits that there are ‘profound differences in theory and practice' in the Dharma traditions. According to Gier, this undermines Malhotra's principal claim that these philosophical schools are "integral".

=== Other peer-reviewed reviews ===
==== Brian Campbell ====
In the Journal of the Anthropological Society of Oxford, Brian Campbell wrote that the book succeeds in fulfilling only one of its four goals. According to Campbell, it gives a simplistic view of modern colonialism. It also fails to reverse the gaze, and to apply dharmic categories to Western socio-cultural reality. According to Campbell, Malhotra does succeed in tracing the difference between Western and Oriental thought.

== See also ==
- Rajiv Malhotra
- Invading the Sacred
- Breaking India
- Indra's Net
- Hinduism Invades America
- Hindu American Foundation

== Sources ==
=== Printed sources ===
- Campbell, Brian (2012), "Review of Being Different: An Indian challenge to Western Universalism, by Rajiv Malhotra" (PDF), Journal of the Anthropological Society of Oxford, 4 (2): 222–225, ISSN 2040-1876, archived from the original (PDF) on 4 March 2016
- Doniger, Wendy (2010), The Hindus: An Alternative History, Oxford University Press, ISBN 9780199593347
- Gier, Nicholas F. (2012), "Overreaching to be different: A critique of Rajiv Malhotra's Being Different", International Journal of Hindu Studies, 16 (3): 259–285, doi:10.1007/s11407-012-9127-x, ISSN 1022-4556, S2CID 144711827
- Gross, Rita M. (2012), "Being Different: An Indian Challenge to Western Universalism", International Journal of Hindu Studies, 16 (3): 323–334, doi:10.1007/s11407-012-9128-9, ISSN 1022-4556, S2CID 144307510
- Kearns, Cleo McNelly (2012), "Christianity, History and the Dharma in Rajiv Malhotra's Being Different", International Journal of Hindu Studies, 16 (3): 349–368, doi:10.1007/s11407-012-9131-1, ISSN 1022-4556, S2CID 143348788
- Larson, Gerald James (December 2012), "The Issue of Not Being Different Enough: Some Reflections on Rajiv Malhotra's Being Different" (PDF), International Journal of Hindu Studies, 16 (3): 311–322, doi:10.1007/s11407-012-9129-8, S2CID 144728948
- Malhotra, Rajiv (2011), Being Different: An Indian Challenge to Western Universalism, HarperCollins Publishers India
- Malhotra, Rajiv (December 2012), "Author's Response: The Question of Dharmic Coherence", International Journal of Hindu Studies, 16 (3): 369–408, doi:10.1007/s11407-012-9132-0
- Rai, Rishabh; Prakash, Anand (21 May 2013), "Being Different: An Indian Challenge to Western Universalism. Rajiv Malhotra", Psychological Studies, 58 (2): 201–205, doi:10.1007/s12646-013-0189-7, S2CID 141650314
- Rukmani, T. S. (29 November 2011), "Book Review: "Being Different: An Indian Challenge to Western Universalism"", Journal of Hindu-Christian Studies, 24: 13, doi:10.7825/2164-6279.1490
- Tilak, Shrinivas (2012), "Differing Worldviews (Western and Dharmic) in Rajiv Malhotra's Being Different", International Journal of Hindu Studies, 16 (3): 287–310, doi:10.1007/s11407-012-9130-2, ISSN 1022-4556, S2CID 143869600
- Wiebe, Donald (2012), "Review of Being Different: An Indian challenge to Western Universalism, by Rajiv Malhotra", Toronto Journal of Theology, 28 (1): 182, doi:10.1353/tjt.2012.0011, ISSN 1918-6371, S2CID 144338156, ISSN 0826-9831
- Yelle, Robert A. (December 2012), "Comparative Religion as Cultural Combat: Occidentalism and Relativism in Rajiv Malhotra's Being Different", International Journal of Hindu Studies, 16 (3): 335–348, doi:10.1007/s11407-012-9133-z, S2CID 144950049

=== Web-sources ===
- Springer (2012). "International Journal of Hindu Studies, volume 16, issue 3".
