= Hindu studies =

Study of traditions and practices of the Indian subcontinent

Hindu studies is the study of the traditions and practices of the Indian subcontinent (especially Hinduism), and considered as a subfield of Indology. Beginning with British philology in the colonial period, Hindu studies has been practiced largely by Westerners, due in part to the lack of a distinct department for religion in Indian academia. Since the 1990s this has caused some dissent from Hindus, raising questions in academia about the role of Hindu studies in creating postcolonial images of India.

== Philological era ==
Between the period 1789 and 1832, British perceptions of Indian culture were completely reversed. Before that time, the British viewed Indians as disorganized and lacking a coherent philosophy. After the mid-19th century, however, the term "Hinduism" became acceptable in English use to refer to an overarching religious structure that spanned India. This was not a one-sided fabrication, since self-identified Hindus met the British challenge with a reappropriation of "Hinduism" and defense of their own culture.

The early study of Hinduism chiefly constituted translations of and commentaries on Sanskrit texts, rather than observation of present-day Hindu life. This historical emphasis on philology has had a strong influence on present day Hindu studies, which often emphasizes medieval and classical period Hinduism.

== Later researchers ==
By the time Wendy Doniger became involved with Hindu studies, the nature of Hinduism as a single category was already in question, having been discussed in Wilfred Cantwell Smith's The Meaning and End of Religion (1962). In a general-audience response, she claimed in the Wilson Quarterly (1991) that Hinduism could be imagined as a "Venn diagram" which together constituted a whole, or akin to light being both a wave and a particle.

== Criticism ==
Beginning in the 1990s, North American Hindu groups began protesting the academic portrayal of their culture. This began in 1995 with the publication of Kali's Child, Jeffrey Kripal's psychoanalytic biography of Ramakrishna. In 1995, the book won the American Academy of Religion award. The book became controversial and Kripal himself became deeply involved in discussing the book with Hindu critics and western scholars. Another controversial psychoanalytical is by Paul B. Courtright's Ganesa: Lord of Obstacles, Lord of Beginnings. Courtright responded that he did not see anything coming out of the Hindu criticism that was worth responding to; Wendy Doniger, for her part, quickly stopped responding to Hindu complaints, and after being egged at a lecture in Britain canceled a talk in Bengal. At the same Britain conference, Wendy Doniger was questioned about her qualifications to speak on Hinduism. According to witnesses, she avoided giving an answer when asked whether she had herself been psychoanalyzed.

In 2002, Rajiv Malhotra founder of Infinity foundation rekindled the debate with a blog post called "RISA Lila - 1: Wendy's Child Syndrome". In the article, Malhotra questioned the application of Freudian psychoanalytical approach in the study of Hinduism and argued that this has been discredited among Western Psychologists and the scholars were not trained psychoanalysts and the approach was not applicable to non-Western subjects. Published on Sulekha.com, the article was widely read.

In 2007 Invading the Sacred, a book written by a multitude of professors including Antonio De Nicholas of Professor Emeritus of Philosophy at the State University of New York, psychoanalyst Alan Roland, S.N. Balagangadhara, Pandita Indrani Rampersad and others which aimed to counter-analyze and refute the dominant narrative of Hindu studies. Anantanand Rambachan wrote that "there can be little doubt about the importance and legitimacy of many of the concerns raised by the authors of Invading the Sacred about the academic study of Hinduism in the United States."

=== Insider/outsider problem ===
The Hindu criticism of Western Hindu studies relies on the terms etic and emic to explain what is missing from Western interpretations. The authors of Invading the Sacred by and large claim that the outsider, etic, perspective has historically shielded scholars from feeling affected by their judgments. However, Shrinivas Tilak writes that insider, emic, scholars must take care to avoid bias as well.

Russell T. McCutcheon, the author of Critics Not Caretakers: Redescribing the Public Study of Religion, has used the controversy as a means to present his own perspective on the insider/outsider problem. In his article "It's a Lie. There's No Truth in It! It's a Sin!", McCutcheon focuses on the attitude of the scholars, who he thinks are going too far in trying to unify the concerns of the Hindus with their own interests. McCutcheon himself believes that rejecting the worldviews of the insiders is essential if religious scholars aim to be something other than "dedicated disciples to one set of voices." He believes that Hindu scholars should make it clear that they are presenting a view that is critical of Hinduism, because presenting a non-critical view means "the end of the human sciences as we know them."

Addressing specific Hindu scholars, McCutcheon sides with Courtright et al. by holding the view that "as scholars we have an intellectual and institution imperative to, at times, study people precisely in ways unwelcome by them." However, the authors of Invading the Sacred assert that they critique etic Western evaluations of Hinduism "not because it is offensive or politically incorrect, but because it is baseless and untruthful."

McCutcheon places himself in opposition to Wilfred Cantwell Smith, one of the leading figures of 20th century religious studies, who wrote that religious traditions must always be taught in a way acceptable to insiders. S. N. Balagangadhara also points out that "some of these 'dialogues' exacerbate violence; they do not reduce it".

=== Defining Hinduism ===
Malhotra's conclusion, however, was that Wendy Doniger was using her authority as a scholar to overrule the culture's self-identity: "Rights of individual scholars must be balanced against rights of cultures and communities they portray, especially minorities that often face intimidation. Scholars should criticize but not define another's religion." Doniger denies that she is defining Hinduism.

== See also ==
- Encyclopedia of Hinduism
- Shaunaka Rishi Das
