= Indra's Net (book) =

2014 book by Rajiv Malhotra

Indra's Net: Defending Hinduism's Philosophical Unity
- Author: Rajiv Malhotra
- Language: English
- Subject: Hinduism, philosophy
- Publisher: HarperCollins Publishers India
- Publication date: 2014 (1st), 2016 (revised)
- Publication place: India
- Media type: Print
- Pages: 376 (2014), 400 (2016)
- ISBN: 978-9351362449 (hardback); 978-9351771791(paperback)
- OCLC: 871215576

Indra's Net: Defending Hinduism's Philosophical Unity is a 2014 book by Rajiv Malhotra, an Indian-American author, public speaker, and advocate of Hindutva, published by HarperCollins.

The book is an appeal against the thesis of neo-Hinduism and a defense of Vivekananda's view of Yoga and Vedanta. The book argues for a unity, coherence, and continuity of the Yogic and Vedantic traditions of Hinduism and Hindu philosophy. It makes proposals for defending Hinduism from what the author considers to be unjust attacks from scholars, misguided public intellectuals, and hostile religious polemicists.

Two scholars asserted that Malhotra had plagiarized parts of the book. In response, he issued a revised edition in 2016.

== Background and release ==
Malhotra had written several previous books defending various aspects of Hinduism. He states that Indra's Net was catalyzed by a 2012 panel at the meetings of the American Academy of Religion to discuss his book Being Different (2011). Two panelists based their objections against the book on the "single premise" that no unified Hindu tradition existed. These panelists "regarded any notion of Hindu unity as a dangerous fabrication and saw me as guilty of propagating it." Malhotra had known of several distinct cases of bias

where the great Hindu visionaries of the modern era were being charged with proto-fascism which struck me as bizarre. But I had not connected the dots or realized how insidious and widespread such a theory had become. Once I started to unravel the myth-making of neo-Hinduism and the ideological motivations behind it, I saw the dire need to contest its widespread acceptance among academic scholars and so-called experts on Hinduism. I decided that the battle must be taken to the academic fortress where the nexus is headquartered and from where it spreads its narratives.

The book's central metaphor is "Indra's Net". As a scriptural image "Indra's Net" was first mentioned in the Atharva Veda (c. 1000 BCE). (Note: The Atharva Veda verse 8.8.6. says: "Vast indeed is the tactical net of great Indra, mighty of action and tempestuous of great speed. By that net, O Indra, pounce upon all the enemies so that none of the enemies may escape the arrest and punishment." And verse 8.8.8. says: "This great world is the power net of mighty Indra, greater than the great. By that Indra-net of boundless reach, I hold all those enemies with the dark cover of vision, mind and senses."Ram, Tulsi (2013). Atharva Veda: Authentic English Translation. Agniveer. pp. 910–911. Archived from the original on 30 March 2014.) In Buddhist philosophy, Indra's Net served as a metaphor in the Avatamsaka Sutra and was further developed by Huayen Buddhism to portray the interconnectedness of everything in the universe. Malhotra employs the metaphor of Indra's Net to express

the profound cosmology and outlook that permeates Hinduism. Indra's Net symbolizes the universe as a web of connections and interdependences.... The net is said to be infinite, and to spread in all directions with no beginning or end. At each node of the net is a jewel, so arranged that every jewel reflects all the other jewels.... a microcosm of the whole net.... [and] individual jewels always remain in flux.

The book uses Indra's Net as a metaphor for the understanding of the universe as a web of connections and interdependences, an understanding which Malhotra wants to revive as the foundation for Vedic cosmology, a perspective that he asserts has "always been implicit" in the outlook of the ordinary Hindu.

Indra's Net was released in India on 29 January 2014 at the Vivekananda International Foundation, where a talk was given by Arun Shourie. Shourie stated that in the book, Malhotra "has given us a pair of spectacles, a new pair of spectacles through which to understand... our own religions and our own tradition".

== Reviews ==
Reviews have appeared in Mental Health, Religion & Culture, The Economic Times, The Free Press Journal and other venues.

In Mental Health, Religion & Culture, Doug Oman wrote that "Indra’s Net is a stimulating, valuable, and partly contentious book that, despite some errors in details, supplies needed correctives for one cluster of serious imbalances in how contemporary Hinduism has been presented. Over time, concerns it highlights could and should inform health professional training materials for religious diversity". He also suggested that "Proposing the distinctive core of Hinduism as a dynamic 'open architecture' is perhaps the book’s most stimulating and important scientific contribution," a model that "suggests many new lines for empirical inquiry" and that "might be adapted to study 'spiritual but not religious' Westerners".

In The Economic Times, Vithal Nadkarni noted the Atharva Vedic origins of the image of Indra's net. To the reviewer, Malhotra's contention that Hinduism has always spanned traditional, modern and post-modern categories "evokes the image of Shiva's Trinity, also known as that of Master of Time past, present and future, enshrined at... Elephanta".

In The Free Press Journal, M. V. Kamath wrote that "Malhotra has done his job in explaining Hinduism [remarkably] well".

Subramanian Swamy, former president of the Janata Party (1990–2013), stated with regard to Indra's Net that "this kind of writing is something that ultimately should become textbook reading for graduate students in India". He added that "this imperialism in scholarship [as criticized in the book] is something that Rajiv Malhotra is fighting alone; we need much more support being given to him".

== Critical responses ==
=== Indra's Net as Orientalist metaphor ===
According to Alexander Owen, the metaphor of Indra's Net is an orientalist invention, and Malhotra's "understanding of Indra's Net is reliant" on this Orientalist trope, exaggerating its significance in the Atharva Veda. According to Owens, "at the heart of Malhotra’s work is a western scholar’s construction of the Chinese Huayan account of the metaphor", attempting to "dismantle the orientalist perception of Hinduism by portraying the orientalist invention of a Vedic/Buddhist metaphor".

=== Response by Anantanand Rambachan ===
Anantanand Rambachan, a Hindu theologian, Vivekananda scholar and professor of religion whose work was repeatedly criticized in Indra's Net, especially in Chapter 6 ("Rambachan's Argument to Fragment Hinduism"), published a response in the Indian right-wing cultural magazine Swarajya. Rambachan stated that "too many of his [Malhotra's] descriptions of my scholarship belong appropriately to the realm of fiction and are disconnected from reality." Rambachan organized his lengthy response "around thirteen of his [Malhotra's] 'myths' about my work. I can easily double this number," also stating that

I share the author’s value for Hindu unity, but [...] The author [Malhotra] wrongly equates serious theological engagement within a tradition with its fragmentation [...] and it is misleading to hold me responsible for what he perceives as Hindu disunity [...] A unity that is grounded in mature and respectful acknowledgment of diversity and difference, open to mutual learning, and rejoicing in all that we share, is a credible one that Hindus can fearlessly and confidently pursue.

=== Allegations of plagiarism ===
In July 2015, Richard Fox Young of Princeton Theological Seminary (Note: Young is the Elmer K. and Ethel R. Timby Associate Professor of the History of Religions at Princeton Theological Seminary. He has authored and edited books on Christianity and Christian conversion in India and elsewhere in Asia. Young's books include "Asia in the making of Christianity: Conversion, Agency, and Indigeneity, 1600s to the Present" (2013, OCLC 855706908), "Constructing Indian Christianities: Culture, Conversion and Caste" (2014, OCLC 900648811), "Perspectives on Christianity in Korea and Japan: the Gospel and culture in East Asia" (1995, OCLC 33101519) and "Resistant Hinduism: Sanskrit sources on anti-Christian Apologetics in Early Nineteenth-Century India" (1981, OCLC 8693222).) (Note: Young studied Malhotra's work for an essay published in 2014. See: Young (2014), Studied Silences? Diasporic Nationalism, ‘Kshatriya Intellectuals’ and the Hindu American Critique of Dalit Christianity’s Indianness. In: Constructing Indian Christianities: Culture, Conversion and Caste chapter 10) (Note: Young gave an explanation for his allegations in an open letter to his colleagues at Princeton Theological Seminary, where he is currently employed. (Note: a letter from Fox to his colleagues) See a letter from Fox to his colleagues Malhotra comments on his references to Nicholson at swarajyamag.com, Nicholson's Untruths, while "Independent Readers and Reviewers" respond at Rebuttal of false allegations against Hindu scholarship.) and Andrew J. Nicholson who authored Unifying Hinduism, alleged Malhotra plagiarized Unifying Hinduism in Indra's Net. (Note: Unifying Hinduism: Statements from the Author and from the Publisher) Nicholson further said that Malhotra not only had plagiarised his book, but also " twists the words and arguments of respectable scholars to suit his own ends." (Note: Nicholson refers to page 163 of Indra's Net, which copies p.14 of Unifying Hinduism: Malhotra Indra's Net p.163: "Vivekananda's challenge was also to show that this complementarity model was superior to models that emphasized conflict and contradiction. He showed great philosophical and interpretive ingenuity, even to those who might not agree with all his conclusions. [19]" (Note: Tradition responds, pp.162-163, 328-329); Nicholson Unifying Hinduism (2010) p.14: "Vijnanabhikshu's challenge is to show that the complementary model he espouses is superior to other models emphasizing conflict and contradiction. Even his distractors must admit that he often shows extraordianry philosophical and interpretive ingenuity, whether or not all his arguments to this end are ultimately persuasive."; Malhotra's note 19 refers to "Nicholson 2010, pp.65, 78," not to p.14. None of these pages mentions Vivekananda.) Permanent Black, publisher of Nicholson's Unifying Hinduism, stated that they would welcome HarperCollins "willingness to rectify future editions" of Indra's Net.

In response to Nicholson, Malhotra stated "I used your work with explicit references 30 times in Indra’s Net, hence there was no ill-intention." He announced that he will be eliminating all references to Nicholson and further explained: (Note: So far, Malhotra has given seven responses: Rajiv Malhotra says those accusing him of plagiarism are really out to silence his voice.1, Rajiv Malhotra on Hindu Intellectuals; Rajiv Malhotra has a rejoinder to Andrew Nicholson; Rajiv Malhotra, Decolonising Indology: Rajiv Malhotra on why he won't follow rules set by the West; Rajiv Malhotra's Indra's Net: Seven big ideas and Hinduism's integral unity; Opinion : Fighting the Sepoys of the Leftist-evangelist Mafia; Indrasnetbook.com also contains a response byThom Loree, copy-editor of Indra’s Net: Statement by the editor of Indra’s Net, based in Toronto, Canada)

I am going to actually remove many of the references to your work simply because you have borrowed from Indian sources and called them your own original ideas [...] Right now, it is western Indologists like you who get to define ‘critical editions’ of our texts and become the primary source and adhikari. This must end and I have been fighting this for 25 years [...] we ought to examine where you got your materials from, and to what extent you failed to acknowledge Indian sources, both written and oral, with the same weight with which you expect me to do so.

In the revised second edition, Malhotra eliminated the thirty references to Nicholson's book:

When writing the first edition of Indra's Net, I included Andrew Nicholson's book (Nicholson, 2010) for my literature review and for citation purposes, because of its alluring title, Unifying Hinduism. I was intrigued that a Westerner would break ranks with those who held that Hinduism had lacked unity prior to British colonialism. Nicholson's promise of understanding unity seemed appealing to me, because I (incorrectly) assumed he meant integral unity. Hence, I referenced many of his ideas and arguments, naming him as a source about thirty times.... [But Nicholson's] idea of Hinduism's unity is that it was the result of a relatively recent historical process; hence the unity is not inherent in the cosmology.... I call this view a synthetic unity, a unity achieved by gluing things together that in fact were separate. My contention has always been that the unity of sanatana dharma (now commonly known as Hinduism) has always been built into the tradition from its Vedic origins.

== Revised edition ==
A revised edition of Indra's Net was published by HarperCollins India in 2016. The revised edition omits most references to the work of Andrew Nicholson, and further explains Malhotra's ideas concerning the unity of Hinduism as inherent in the tradition from the times of its Vedic origins. The revised chapter 8, with references, is available online.

== See also ==
- Unifying Hinduism
- Breaking India
- Invading the Sacred
- Being Different
- The Battle for Sanskrit

== Sources ==
- Bharati, Agehananda (February 1970). "The Hindu Renaissance and its Apologetic Patterns". The Journal of Asian Studies. 29 (2): 267–287. doi:10.2307/2942625. JSTOR 2942625. S2CID 154591435.
- De Michelis, Elizabeth (2005), A History of Modern Yoga, Continuum
- Halbfass, Wilhelm (1995). Philology and Confrontation: Paul Hacker on Traditional and Modern Vedanta. State University of New York Press. ISBN 978-0791425824.
- Jones, Ken H. (2003), The New Social Face of Buddhism: A Call to Action, Wisdom Publications, ISBN 0-86171-365-6
- King, Richard (1999a), Orientalism and Religion: Post-Colonial Theory, India and "The Mystic East", Routledge
- King, Richard (1999b). "Orientalism and the Modern Myth of "Hinduism"". NUMEN. 46 (2). BRILL: 146–185. doi:10.1163/1568527991517950. JSTOR 3270313. S2CID 45954597.
- Malhotra, Rajiv (2014). Indra's Net: Defending Hinduism's Philosophical Unity. Noida, India: HarperCollins Publishers India. ISBN 978-9351362449. OCLC 871215576.
- Nicholson, Andrew J. (2010). Unifying Hinduism: Philosophy and Identity in Indian Intellectual History. Columbia University Press. ISBN 9780231149860.
- Odin, Steve (1982), Process Metaphysics and Hua-Yen Buddhism: A Critical Study of Cumulative Penetration Vs. Interpenetration, SUNY Press, ISBN 0-87395-568-4
- Shourie, Arun (29 January 2014). "Indra's Net".
- Rambachan, Anantanand (30 April 2015). Untangling the False Knots in Rajiv Malhotra's 'Indra's Net'. swarajyamag.com. OCLC 3999897.
- Slater, T. E. (2010) [1903]. The Higher Hinduism in Relation to Christianity. Karig Press. pp. 4–6. ISBN 978-1445508153.
