= Unifying Hinduism =

Unifying Hinduism: Philosophy and Identity in Indian Intellectual History
- First edition
- Author: Andrew J. Nicholson
- Language: English
- Genre: Hindu philosophy, history of Hinduism, Indian philosophy
- Publisher: Columbia University Press, Permanent Black
- Publication date: 2010
- Pages: 266
- ISBN: 0231149875
- OCLC: 881368213

Unifying Hinduism: Philosophy and Identity in Indian Intellectual History is a 2010 book written by the American Indologist Andrew J. Nicholson, Associate Professor of Hinduism and Indian Intellectual History at the State University of New York (SUNY), on the history of Indian philosophy, describing the philosophical unification of Hinduism, which the author places in the Middle Ages. The book was published in the United States in 2010 in hardcover, with a paperback edition appearing in 2014. An Indian hardcover edition was published by Permanent Black in 2011. The book won the 2011 award for Best First Book in the History of Religions from the American Academy of Religion, and has been reviewed in numerous academic journals.

== Topics covered ==
Unifying Hinduism contains 10 chapters. Much of the book focuses on the thought of the medieval Indian philosopher Vijñānabhikṣu. The book's central concern is to show that Vijñānabhikṣu provided a philosophical synthesis of diverse schools of Indian philosophy, thereby providing a philosophical unification of Hinduism long before the British colonial conquest and rule of India. This refutes claims that Hinduism only attained unity (or only was "invented") as a response to colonial influence.

After an introductory first chapter, the next five chapters focus on Vijñānabhikṣu's philosophical syntheses. Chapter 2, entitled "An Alternate History of Vedanta", sets the stage by tracing the history of Bhedābheda Vedānta, a comparatively neglected tradition that teaches the "difference and nondifference" of Brahman and the individual self. Vijñānabhikṣu's version of this "Difference and Non-Difference" Vedānta is described in Chapter 3.

Chapter 4 offers a historical overview of two important non-Vedānta, earlier orthodox Indian philosophies: the philosophical schools of Sāṃkhya and Yoga, focusing on their views of God, documenting that, contrary to the widespread view of Sāṃkhya as an entirely atheistic school of thought, most first millennium Sāṃkhya philosophers were theistic. Chapter 5, "Reading Against the Grain of the Sāṃkhyasūtras", focuses on a controversial assertion by Vijñānabhikṣu that some verses in the Sāṃkhyasūtras that explicitly argue against God's existence do not ultimately intend to deny God's existence, but represent merely a “temporary concession” (abhyupagamavāda) or “bold assertion” (prauḍhivāda). Finally, Chapter 6, "Yoga, Praxis, and Liberation", discusses Vijñānabhikṣu's commentary on Patañjali's Yogasūtras, arguing that Vijñānabhikṣu's commentaries on Vedānta, Sāṃkhya, and Yoga represent a unified whole.

Chapter 7, "Vedanta and Samkhya in the Orientalist Imagination", discusses how Vijñānabhikṣu was diversely viewed by 19th-century European scholars, who in some sense can be understood as "intellectual inheritors of Vijñānabhikṣu’s thought".

The next two chapters return to South Asian thought, with Chapter 8 focuses on Indian philosophical doxographies (categorizations) and Chapter 9, "Affirmers (Āstikas) and Deniers (Nāstikas) in Indian History", providing a history and preferred translation of the two terms āstika and nāstika, which are more often translated as "orthodox" and "heterodox". The concluding tenth chapter, "Hindu Unity and the Non-Hindu Other", discusses the timing of the unification of Hindu philosophical schools, suggesting that the stimulus was the presence of Islam in the Indian subcontinent.

== Reception ==
Unifying Hinduism won the 2011 award for Best First Book in the History of Religions from the American Academy of Religion.

Reviews have appeared in academic journals such as the Journal of the American Academy of Religion, Religious Studies Review, Sophia, Journal of the American Oriental Society, Journal of Asian Studies, Journal of Hindu Studies, South Asian History and Culture, Literature and Theology, Choice, and Metapsychology. Unifying Hinduism has also been discussed in the 2014 book Indra's Net: Defending Hinduism's Philosophical Unity, written by Indian-American author Rajiv Malhotra.

In the Journal of the American Academy of Religion, Christopher Key Chapple wrote that the author "has created a tour-de-force that puts India’s premodern thinkers in conversation with its postmodern intellectuals". In particular, Chapple stated that "Nicholson has created a masterful analysis of how premodern India conceptualized and reflected upon the issues of unity and plurality. Medieval Hindu thinkers set forth a philosophical position that seeks to articulate a coherent worldview without sacrificing the complexity of India’s divergent views and deities. Nicholson demonstrates that this endeavor was not an artificial product of modernist, revisionist hybridity as asserted by Orientalist scholars but an authentic autochthonous response to an intricate theological context [and] had a reflexive self-awareness and a level of sophistication commensurate and perhaps even more inclusively complex than those found in the western Christian, Jewish, and Islamic theological traditions."

Also in the Journal of the American Academy of Religion, Michael S. Allen wrote that the book won Best First Book "for good reason: lucid and accessible... Nicholson’s book offers an excellent model for South Asianists seeking to engage with the wider field of religious studies", while the book "can also be recommended to nonspecialists with interests in religious identity, boundary formation, and comparative theology". To Allen, "Nicholson has convincingly shown that a process of unification began well before the British colonial period, extending back several centuries at the very least". However, "there is reason to suspect that the beginnings of the process he describes predate the twelfth century.... [which] would in turn call into question the degree to which Islam influenced the process."

In Religious Studies Review, Jeffrey D. Long wrote that the book "sets the record straight" regarding the historical emergence Hinduism, and "promises to change the scholarly conversation on Hindu identity". Long describes the book as "marvelously clear, meticulously researched, and tightly argued", pointing out that the book also "problematizes or demolishes a number of other oft-repeated truisms of Indian intellectual history, such as that Samkhya was always atheistic, that Advaita is the earliest and truest to the original sources of the systems of Vedanta, and that Vijnanabhiksu... was an unrepresentative thinker of little importance to the Vedanta tradition."

In Sophia, Reid Locklin wrote the book was "somewhat fragmented", with chapters showing marks of prior publication or presentation elsewhere, but that "The cumulative effect is nevertheless very impressive", and that "Given the enormous scope of its enquiry, the work is relatively concise, very accessible and therefore suitable for the advanced undergraduate or graduate classroom".

In Journal of the American Oriental Society, John Nemec wrote that the book's strengths "lie with the larger, theoretical argument Nicholson makes regarding the role of doxography in shaping knowledge", and that the book "is unquestionably a theoretically subtle and thought-provoking treatment of a neglected chapter in the history of Indian philosophy [that] raises important questions about intellectual history and convincingly makes the case for the significance of Vijñānabhikṣu’s writings." On the other hand, Nemec was still left "with certain doubts and questions", such as how our understanding of Vijnanabhiksu's views might change if more of his works were available in translation, and whether premodern Indian philosophers might have been "more aware of their mutual differences than this volume allows". Despite such doubts, Nemec suggested that the volume would be "of value to medievalists, scholars of Vedānta, Sāṃkhya, and Yoga, and of Indian philosophy more generally, to scholars concerned with colonialism, and even those concerned with communal relations in contemporary South Asia."

In Journal of Asian Studies, Tulasi Srinivas wrote that she "found this book very valuable, challenging of my assumptions", calling the book "erudite and thought provoking", and its argument "powerful, well researched and delivered, and... remarkably persuasive". She wondered whether "penetrability" between various philosophical schools might be overstated, and how views of Vijnanabhiksu might change if more of his works were available in translation. She regarded the book as having "political ramifications that suggest that the origins of Hinduism are not only the Vedas, as Hindu nationalists claim... nor a product of British colonial rule... as understood by some scholars." She also viewed the book as significant for its "broader political and critical claim that Bhedabheda Vedanta is valuable and on par with the better known schools of Indian philosophy".

In Journal of Hindu Studies, David Buchta wrote that the author's position is "clearly and coherently argued and well-supported", stating that "the balance that Nicholson's analysis offers, correcting exaggerated claims about the colonial invention of Hinduism, is its most important contribution to the study of Hinduism". Furthermore, Nicholson "shows sensitivity to the political implications of the discussion and the possibility that scholarship supporting the pre-colonial development of a sense of Hindu unity can be co-opted in support of communalism", and is therefore "careful to emphasise that, while Hindus may have long agreed that a sense of unity exists, the details have just as long been to subject of debate and development".

In South Asian History and Culture, Kaif Mahmood pointed out that "beliefs" have been only one among many types of religious expression that also include religious art, ritual, and law; Mahmood suggested that Nicholson engaged in "unstated [and debatable] theoretical presumptions that philosophy is identical to religion". Nicholson's analyses also raise the question, unaddressed by the book, of whether "if what we call Hinduism was invented for the purpose of preserving a particular identity, what was it that was being preserved, if there was no Hinduism before? A weak identity may be strengthened, even refined, but can an identity be invented out of nothing?" Mahmood is also concerned that the book fails to discuss or acknowledge a core question related to Vijnanbhiksu's motivation, that is

Did Vijñānabhikṣu create an inclusive classification of Indian philosophy primarily [as propaganda] to preserve an identity, rather than to state the truth as he saw it? Or, did Vijñānabhikṣu's historical circumstances merely act as catalysts for the elaboration of the fundamentally 'polycentric' nature of Indian philosophy, an elaboration for which conditions had not been ripe earlier – that the schools of philosophy are primarily concerned with different aspects of reality, and hence, fundamentally reconcilable.... This is an important distinction for anyone seriously interested in Indian philosophy and the nature of philosophy in general...

In Literature and Theology, Robert Leach wrote that the book was "rich, erudite, challenging, and always interesting [and] it will be very difficult to read this book and retain the notion that the idea of Hinduism was dreamt up, virtually from scratch, in the 19th century". Leach added that

it is not wholly convincing that Vijñānabhikṣu's inclusivist project is categorically distinct from strategies applied by earlier authors whom Nicholson omits from the historical process of unifying Hinduism. Among pre-12th century authors who systematically assembled South Asian intellectual traditions in a conceivably 'proto-Hindu' fashion, and who did so in a context which does not appear to have been shaped by rivalries with Islam, we can count, for example, Bhasarvajna and Bhatta Jayanta. And to these we may add several passages from Puranic works such as the Visnudharmottarapurana (e.g. 2.22.128-134) and the Agnipurana (219.57c-61).

Leach also found of interest Nicholson's conclusion that "in Classical India nastika principally denoted non-acceptance of 'correct ritual performance' (i.e. heteropraxy), but in late medieval Vedanta came to be understood as the rejection of 'correct opinion' (heterodoxy)", pointing out that "This conclusion can have significant consequences for the debate on the so-called 'Protestantisation' of Hinduism in the 19th century".

In Choice, R. Puligandla described the book as "clear, analytical, well-documented", recommending that "all scholars and students of Hinduism and Indian philosophy should find this book beneficial and rewarding", although "Nicholson's arguments and conclusions will not persuade some scholars, especially those who hold the view that Hinduism as a unified tradition has existed since ancient times".

In Metapsychology, Vineeth Mathoor described the book as presenting "the history of [the] dialectical relation between Hinduism and the many streams within it [yielding] what it today stands for: tolerance, pluralism and inclusivism", calling the book "path-breaking" and "a must read for scholars of Indian history, Hinduism and south Asian religious traditions".

== Controversy ==
In the 2014 book Indra's Net: Defending Hinduism's Philosophical Unity, written by Indian-American author Rajiv Malhotra, the author quoted Nicholson several times and cited numerous ideas from Unifying Hinduism, describing it as an "excellent study of the pre-colonial coherence of Hinduism", and as a "positive exception to many [reifying, homogenizing, and isolating] trends in scholarship" by Westerners about the evolution of Hindu philosophy. However, despite the citations, it was alleged that Malhotra's book actually plagiarized Nicholson's work. It led to an online controversy without any actual lawsuit being filed against Malhotra. In response to Nicholson, Malhotra stated "I used your work with explicit references 30 times in Indra's Net, hence there was no ill-intention," and provided with a list of these citations. He added that he will be removing all references to Nicholson, replacing them with original Indian sources. Thereafter, a re-written version of the debated chapter was posted on the book's website.

== Editions ==
The original hardcover edition was published by in 2010 by Columbia University Press. A hardcover edition was published in India in 2011 by Permanent Black. Paperback and electronic versions have also been published:

- Nicholson, Andrew J. (2014). Unifying Hinduism: philosophy and identity in Indian intellectual history. New York: Columbia University Press. ISBN 9780231149877. ISBN 0231149875, OCLC 881368213 (266 pages), paperback
- Nicholson, Andrew J. (2011). Unifying Hinduism: philosophy and identity in Indian intellectual history. Delhi: Permanent Black. ISBN 9788178243283. ISBN 8178243288 (266 pages), hardback
- Nicholson, Andrew J. (2010). Unifying Hinduism: philosophy and identity in Indian intellectual history. New York, London: Columbia University Press. ISBN 9780231149860. ISBN 0231149867, OCLC 898542146 (266 pages), hardback
- Nicholson, Andrew J. (2010). Unifying Hinduism: philosophy and identity in Indian intellectual history. New York: Columbia University Press. ISBN 9780231149860. ISBN 0231526423, OCLC 897040609 (266 pages), electronic book
- Nicholson, Andrew J. (2010). Unifying Hinduism: philosophy and identity in Indian intellectual history. Perseus Book LLC. ISBN 9781282872417. ISBN 1282872419, OCLC 816612398 (266 pages), electronic book

== See also ==
- Brahmanism
- Hindu philosophy
- Hindu texts
- History of India
- Indra's Net: Defending Hinduism's Philosophical Unity (2014), book by Rajiv Malhotra on Neo-Vedanta
- Infinite Paths to Infinite Reality (2018), book by Ayon Maharaj, also known as Swami Medhananda on Sri Ramakrishna
- Sanskrit literature
