= Yaoyorozu no Kami =

Japanese theological concept

Yaoyorozu no Kami (八百万の神; lit. "Eight million gods") refers to the multitude of kami in Shinto. The expression does not indicate an exact number of eight million deities; rather, it is an idiomatic expression meaning an innumerable or vast number of kami.

== See also ==
- Indra's net
