= Journal of the Anthropological Society of Oxford =

Open access academic journal

- Discipline: Anthropology
- Language: English
- Edited by: Editorial Collective

Publication details
- History: 1970–2000; 2009–present
- Publisher: Anthropological Society of Oxford
- Frequency: Biannually
- Open access: Yes

Standard abbreviations
- ISO 4: J. Anthropol. Soc. Oxf.

Indexing
- ISSN: 0044-8370 (print); 2040-1876 (web)

Links
- Journal homepage

The Journal of the Anthropological Society of Oxford (JASO) is a peer-reviewed academic journal of anthropology that was established in 1970. Publishing the print edition was discontinued in 2000 and in 2009 the journal was re-launched as an open access online journal without publishing fees (diamond open access). All the back-issues and occasional papers are available online. For many years the editor-in-chief was Bob Parkin who has also written about the history of the journal. Malcolm Chapman also discusses the history in his introduction to Edwin Ardener's essays.

Since 2023 the journal has been run by a collective made up of research students and three members of Oxford anthropology teaching staff: Morgan Clarke, Chihab El Khachab and David Zeitlyn.

== Abstracting and indexing ==
The journal is abstracted and indexed by the Anthropological Index Online and International Bibliography of the Social Sciences and since late 2025 JASO has been indexed in Scopus sourceid/21101294504
