= Shreena Niketa Gandhi =

American historian

Shreena Niketa Gandhi (born 1979) is an American historian of religion, race, and empire at Michigan State University. Gandhi’s research demonstrates how American practices of yoga can be understood within the broader history of structural racism in the United States.

== Early life and education ==
Gandhi was born in London but, at age six, her family moved to The Bronx, New York. Gandhi graduated from Swarthmore College in 2001, and then completed her master's degree at Harvard Divinity School under the mentorship of Robert Orsi. In 2009, Gandhi completed her doctoral research in Religious Studies at the University of Florida. Her dissertation was advised by Vasudha Naraganan.

== Research and academic career ==
From 2010 to 2016, Gandhi was a professor of religion at Kalamazoo College, where she was also a social justice fellow at the Arcus Center. In 2016, she was hired by Michigan State University and moved to East Lansing.

Gandhi's early research focused on yoga in popular culture. Through eight peer-reviewed articles and book chapters, she established that yoga in the United States has been shaped and commodified as a practice in exercise and wellbeing. This commodification has shifted discourses of yoga in ways that reflect the bodies and identities of suburban America, particularly the values embodied by white, upper-class women. She was solicited to write the entry for "yoga" in The Encyclopedia of Global Religion. In her subsequent work, Gandhi has pivoted to a broader assessment of how Americans from all backgrounds, including many immigrants, have both benefited and suffered from the national legacy of white supremacy.

Gandhi has held a number of leadership positions within the American Academy of Religion, including as co-chair of the North American Hinduism unit, and on the steering committees for the Yoga in Theory and Practice and North American Religion programs. In 2019, she was selected as a member of the inaugural fellows cohort for Sacred Writes, a public scholarship initiative funded by the Henry Luce Foundation.
