= Wendy Doniger =

American Indologist (born 1940)

Wendy Doniger O'Flaherty
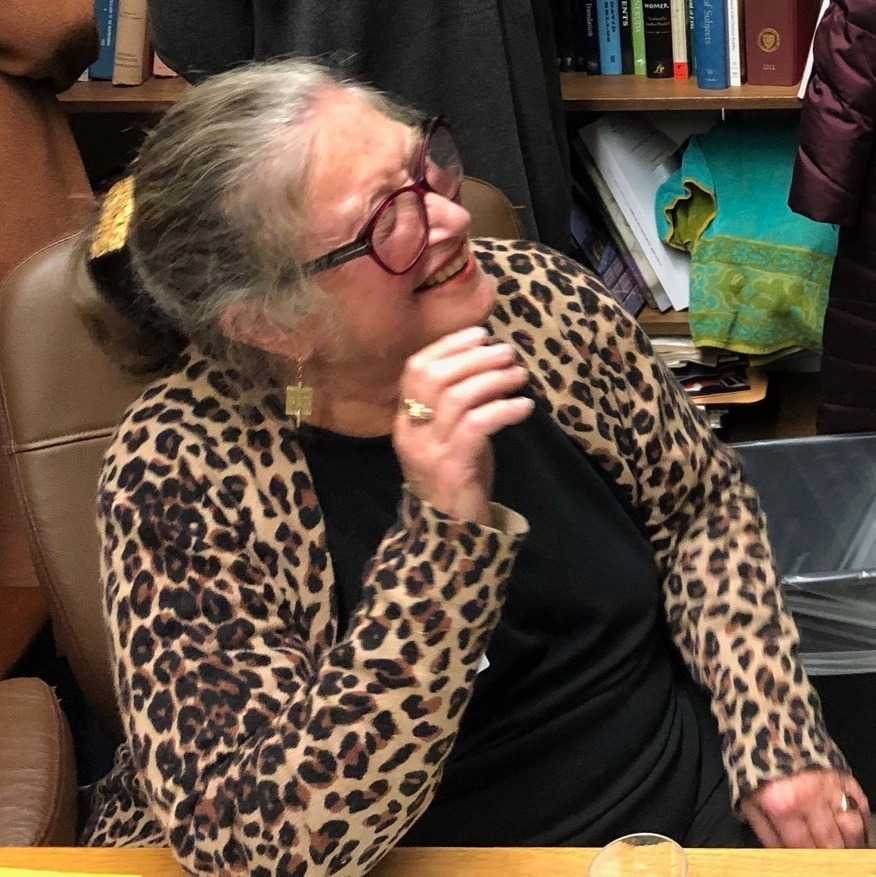
- Doniger in 2025
- Born: Wendy Doniger; November 20, 1940 (age 85); New York City, New York, U.S.
- Education: Radcliffe College (BA); Harvard University (PhD); Oxford University (DPhil)
- Occupation: Indologist
- Scientific career
- Fields: Sanskrit literature; Hinduism; Mythology; History of Religions
- Workplaces: University of Chicago
- Doctoral advisor: Daniel H. H. Ingalls, Sr. (Harvard); R.C.Zaehner (Oxford)
- Doctoral students: Jeffrey Kripal, Alexander Argüelles

Wendy Doniger O'Flaherty (born November 20, 1940) is an American Indologist whose professional career has spanned five decades. A scholar of Sanskrit and Indian textual traditions, her major works include The Hindus: An Alternative History; Asceticism and Eroticism in the Mythology of Siva; Hindu Myths: A Sourcebook; The Origins of Evil in Hindu Mythology; Women, Androgynes, and Other Mythical Beasts; and The Rig Veda: An Anthology, 108 Hymns Translated from the Sanskrit.

She is the Mircea Eliade Distinguished Service Professor Emerita of History of Religions at the University of Chicago, and has taught there since 1978. In 1998 she served as president of the Association for Asian Studies.

== Biography ==
Wendy Doniger was born in New York City to immigrant non-observant Jewish parents, and raised in Great Neck, New York, where her father, Lester L. Doniger (1909–1971), ran a publishing business. While in high school, she studied dance under George Balanchine and Martha Graham.

She graduated summa cum laude in Sanskrit and Indian Studies from Radcliffe College in 1962, and received her M.A. from Harvard Graduate School of Arts and Sciences in June 1963. She then studied in India in 1963–1964 with a 12-month Junior Fellowship from the American Institute of Indian Studies. She received a Ph.D. from Harvard University in June 1968, with a dissertation on Asceticism and Sexuality in the Mythology of Siva, supervised by Daniel H. H. Ingalls, Sr. She obtained a D.Phil. in Oriental Studies from Oxford University, in February 1973, with a dissertation on The Origins of Heresy in Hindu Mythology, supervised by Robert Charles Zaehner.

Doniger held the Mircea Eliade Distinguished Service Professor Chair in History of Religions at the University of Chicago. She is the editor of the scholarly journal History of Religions, having served on its editorial board since 1979, and has edited a dozen other publications in her career. In 1985, she was elected president of the American Academy of Religion, and in 1997 President of the Association for Asian Studies. She serves on the International Editorial Board of the Encyclopædia Britannica.

She was invited to give the 2010 Art Institute of Chicago President's Lecture at the Chicago Humanities Festival, which was titled, "The Lingam Made Flesh: Split-Level Symbolism in Hindu Art".

== Reception ==
=== Recognition ===
Since she began writing in the 1960s, Doniger has gained the reputation of being "one of America's major scholars in the humanities". Assessing Doniger's body of work, K. M. Shrimali, Professor of Ancient Indian History at the University of Delhi, writes:

... it (1973) also happened to be the year when her first major work in early India's religious history, viz., Siva, the Erotic Ascetic was published and had instantly become a talking point for being a path-breaking work. I still prescribe it as the most essential reading to my postgraduate students at the University of Delhi, where I have been teaching a compulsory course on 'Evolution of Indian Religions' for the last nearly four decades. It was the beginning of series of extremely fruitful and provocative encounters with the formidable scholarship of Wendy Doniger.

Doniger is a scholar of Sanskrit and Indian textual traditions. By her self-description,

I myself am by both temperament and training inclined to texts. I am neither an archaeologist nor an art historian; I am a Sanskritist, indeed a recovering Orientalist, of a generation that framed its study of Sanskrit with Latin and Greek rather than Urdu or Tamil. I've never dug anything up out of the ground or established the date of a sculpture. I've labored all my adult life in the paddy fields of Sanskrit, ...

Her books both in Hinduism and other fields have been positively reviewed by the Indian scholar Vijaya Nagarajan and the American Hindu scholar Lindsey B. Harlan, who noted as part of a positive review that "Doniger's agenda is her desire to rescue the comparative project from the jaws of certain proponents of postmodernism". Of her Hindu Myths: A Sourcebook Translated from the Sanskrit, the Indologist Richard Gombrich wrote: "Intellectually, it is a triumph..." Doniger's (then O'Flaherty) 1973 book Asceticism and Eroticism in the Mythology of Śiva was a critique of the "Great tradition Śivapurāṇas and the tension that arises between Śiva's ascetic and erotic activities." Richard Gombrich called it "learned and exciting"; however, John H. Marr was disappointed that the "regionalism" so characteristic of the texts is absent in Doniger's book, and wondered why the discussion took so long. Doniger's Rigveda, a translation of 108 hymns selected from the canon, was deemed among the most reliable by historian of religion Ioan P. Culianu. However, in an email message, Michael Witzel called it "idiosyncratic and unreliable just like her Jaiminiya Brahmana or Manu (re-)translations."

=== Criticism ===
Beginning in the early 2000s, some conservative diaspora Hindus started to question whether Doniger accurately described Hindu traditions. Together with some of her colleagues, she was the subject of a critique by Hindu right-wing activist speaker Rajiv Malhotra, for using psychoanalytic concepts to interpret non-Western subjects. Aditi Banerjee, a co-author of Malhotra, criticised Wendy Doniger as grossly misquoting the text of Valmiki Ramayana. Rajiv Malhotra criticizes Doniger in his articles ‘RISA Lila–1: Wendy's Child Syndrome’ and ‘RISA Lila–2: Limp Scholarship and Demonology’ where her and her students have misrepresented Hindu traditions and texts.

Christian Lee Novetzke, associate professor of South Asian Studies at the University of Washington, summarizes this controversy as follows:

Wendy Doniger, a premier scholar of Indian religious thought and history expressed through Sanskritic sources, has faced regular criticism from those who consider her work to be disrespectful of Hinduism in general.

Novetzke cites Doniger's use of "psychoanalytical theory" as

... a kind of lightning rod for the censure that these scholars receive from freelance critics and 'watch-dog' organizations that claim to represent the sentiments of Hindus.

Philosopher Martha Nussbaum, concurring with Novetzke, adds that while the agenda of those in the American Hindu community who criticize Doniger appears similar to that of the Hindu right-wing in India, it is not quite the same since it has "no overt connection to national identity", and that it has created feelings of guilt among American scholars, given the prevailing ethos of ethnic respect, that they might have offended people from another culture.

While Doniger has agreed that Indians have ample grounds to reject postcolonial domination, she claims that her works are only a single perspective which does not subordinate Indian self-identity.

Her authorship of the section describing Hindu Religion in Microsoft's Encarta Encyclopedia was criticized for being politically motivated and distorted. Following a review, the article was withdrawn. Patak Kumar notes that Doniger has given a "dispassionate secular critique" of Hinduism, which is met with defensive responses by Indian scholars such as Varadaraja V. Raman, who acknowledged the "sound scholarship" of Doniger, but urged "appreciation and sensitivity" when "analyzing works regarded as sacred by vast numbers of people."

=== The Hindus ===
Doniger's trade book, The Hindus: An Alternative History was published in 2009 by Viking/Penguin. According to the Hindustan Times, The Hindus was a No. 1 bestseller in its non-fiction category in the week of October 15, 2009. Two scholarly reviews in the Social Scientist and the Journal of the American Oriental Society, though praising Doniger for her textual scholarship, criticized both Doniger's poor historiography and her lack of focus. In the popular press, the book has received many positive reviews, for example from the Library Journal, the Times Literary Supplement, the New York Review of Books, The New York Times, and The Hindu. In January 2010, the National Book Critics Circle named The Hindus as a finalist for its 2009 book awards. The Hindu American Foundation protested this decision, alleging inaccuracies and bias in the book.

In 2011, a lawsuit was filed against Doniger and Penguin books by Dinanath Batra on the grounds that the book intentionally offended or outraged the religious sentiments of Hindus, an action punishable by criminal prosecution under Section 295A of the Indian Penal Code. In 2014, as part of a settlement agreement reached with plaintiff, The Hindus was recalled by Penguin India. Indian authors such as Arundhati Roy, Partha Chatterjee, Jeet Thayil, and Namwar Singh inveighed against the publisher's decision. The book has since been published in India by Speaking Tiger Books.

== Recognition ==
- 1989 elected to the American Academy of Arts and Sciences
- 1996 elected to the American Philosophical Society
- 2000 PEN Oakland/Josephine Miles Award for excellence in multi-cultural literature, non-fiction, for Splitting the Difference
- 2002 Rose Mary Crawshay prize from the British Academy, for the best book about English literature written by a woman, for The Bedtrick
- 2008 Martin E. Marty Public Understanding of Religion Award from the American Academy of Religion
- 2015 Charles Homer Haskins Prize of the American Council of Learned Societies

== Works ==
Doniger has written 16 books, translated (primarily from Sanskrit to English) with commentary nine other volumes, has contributed to many edited texts and has written hundreds of articles in journals, magazines and newspapers. These include New York Times Book Review, London Review of Books, the Times Literary Supplement, The Times, The Washington Post, U.S. News & World Report, International Herald Tribune, Parabola, The Chronicle of Higher Education, Daedalus, The Nation, and the Journal of Asian Studies.

=== Interpretive works ===
Published under the name of Wendy Doniger O'Flaherty:

- Served as Vedic consultant and co-author, and contributed a chapter ("Part II: The Post-Vedic History of the Soma Plant," pp. 95–147) in Soma: Divine Mushroom of Immortality, by R. Gordon Wasson (New York: Harcourt Brace, 1968).
- Asceticism and Eroticism in the Mythology of Siva (Oxford University Press, 1973).
- The Ganges (London: Macdonald Educational, 1975).
- The Origins of Evil in Hindu Mythology (Berkeley: University of California, 1976).
- Women, Androgynes, and Other Mythical Beasts (Chicago: University of Chicago Press, 1980).
- Dreams, Illusion, and Other Realities (Chicago: University of Chicago Press, 1984 ).
- Tales of Sex and Violence: Folklore, Sacrifice, and Danger in the Jaiminiya Brahmana (Chicago: University of Chicago Press, 1985).
- Other Peoples' Myths: The Cave of Echoes. (New York: Macmillan, 1988).

Published under the name of Wendy Doniger:

- The Implied Spider: Politics and Theology in Myth. The 1996–1997 ACLS/AAR Lectures. New York: Columbia University Press, 1998.
- Splitting the Difference: Gender and Myth in Ancient Greece and India. The 1996 Jordan Lectures. Chicago and London: University of London Press and University of Chicago Press, 1999.
- Der Mann, der mit seiner eigenen Frau Ehebruch beging. Mit einem Kommentar von Lorraine Daston. Berlin: Suhrkamp, 1999.
- The Bedtrick: Tales of Sex and Masquerade. Chicago: University of Chicago Press, 2000.
- La Trappola della Giumenta. Trans. Vincenzo Vergiani. Milan: Adelphi Edizione, 2003.
- The Woman Who Pretended to Be Who She Was. New York: Oxford University Press, 2005.
- The Hindus: An Alternative History. New York: Penguin Press, 2009.
- The Donigers of Great Neck: A Mythologized Memoir. Waltham, MA: Brandeis University Press, 2019.

=== Translations ===
Published under the name of Wendy Doniger O'Flaherty:

- Hindu Myths: A Sourcebook, translated from the Sanskrit. Harmondsworth: Penguin Classics, 1975.
- The Rig Veda: An Anthology, 108 Hymns Translated from the Sanskrit (Harmondsworth: Penguin Classics, 1981).
- (with David Grene) Antigone (Sophocles). A new translation for the Court Theatre, Chicago, production of February 1983.
- Textual Sources for the Study of Hinduism, in the series Textual Sources for the Study of Religion, edited by John R. Hinnells (Chicago: University of Chicago Press, 1990).
- (with David Grene). Oresteia. A New Translation for the Court Theatre Production of 1986. (Chicago: University of Chicago Press, 1988).

Published under the name of Wendy Doniger:

- Mythologies. A restructured translation of Yves Bonnefoy's Dictionnaire des Mythologies, prepared under the direction of Wendy Doniger (Chicago: University of Chicago Press. 1991). 2 vols.
- The Laws of Manu. A new translation, with Brian K. Smith, of the Manavadharmasastra (Harmondsworth: Penguin Classics, 1991).
- Vātsyāyana Kāmasūtra. A new translation by Wendy Doniger and Sudhir Kakar. New York: Oxford University Press, 2002.
- The Lady of the Jewel Necklace and The Lady Who Shows Her Love. Harsha's Priyadarsika and Ratnavali. Clay Sanskrit Series. New York: New York University Press, JJC Foundation, 2006.

=== Edited volumes ===
Published under the name of Wendy Doniger O'Flaherty:

- The Concept of Duty in South Asia. (with J. D. M. Derrett). (London: School of Oriental and African Studies).
- The Critical Study of Sacred Texts. (Berkeley: Graduate Theological Union, Religious Studies Series, 1979).
- Karma and Rebirth in Classical Indian Traditions. (Berkeley: University of California Press; 1980).
- Elephanta: The Cave of Siva. Wendy Doniger O'Flaherty, Carmel Berkson, and George Michell (Princeton: Princeton University Press, 1983). ISBN 978-0-691-04009-7
- Religion and Change. Edited by Wendy Doniger O'Flaherty. History of Religions 25:4 (May 1986).

Published under the name of Wendy Doniger:

- Animals in Four Worlds: Sculptures from India. Photographs by Stella Snead; text by Wendy Doniger and George Michell (Chicago: University of Chicago Press, 1989).
- Purana Perennis: Reciprocity and Transformation in Hindu and Jaina Texts. Essays by David Shulman, V. Narayana Rao, A. K. Ramanujan, Friedhelm Hardy, John Cort, Padmanabh Jaini, Laurie Patton, and Wendy Doniger. Edited by Wendy Doniger. (SUNY Press, 1993).
- Off with Her Head! The Denial of Women's Identity in Myth, Religion, and Culture. Ed., with Howard Eilberg-Schwartz. Berkeley: University of California Press, 1995.
- Myth and Method. Ed., with Laurie Patton. Virginia: University of Virginia Press, 1996.
- The Norton Anthology of World Religions: Hinduism. Ed., with Jack Miles. New York: Norton, 2015.

=== Articles ===
- Articles for the New York Review of Books

== See also ==
- A. K. Ramanujan, author of 300 Ramayanas
- Censorship in India

== Notes ==
Awards and achievements
Preceded by Annette Peach; Lucy Newlyn	Rose Mary Crawshay Prize; 2002 and Kate Flint	Succeeded by Jane Stabler; Claire Tomalin
