= Alan Roland =

American psychoanalyst and author (died 2023)

Alan Roland (died July 22, 2023) was an American psychoanalyst and author.

== Books ==
- In Search of Self in India and Japan: Toward a Cross-Cultural Psychology
- Dreams and Drama: Psychoanalytic Criticism, Creativity and the Artist
- Cultural Pluralism and Psychoanalysis: The Asian and North American Experience
- Journeys to Foreign Selves: Asians and Asian Americans in a Global Era
