= Hinduism Invades America =

1930 scholarly work by Wendell Thomas

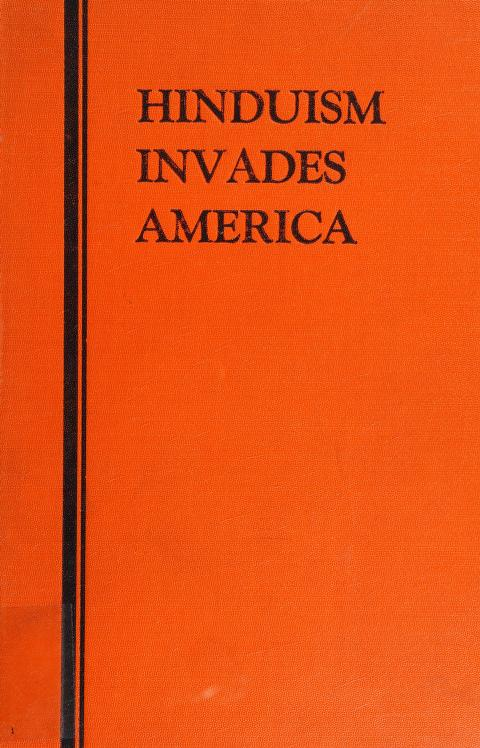
- Author: Wendell Thomas
- Publication date: 1930

Hinduism Invades America is an early twentieth-century scholarly work on the introduction of Hinduism in America, which was authored by Wendell Thomas in 1930.

== See also ==
- Autobiography of a Yogi
