= The Hindus: An Alternative History =

2009 book by Wendy Doniger

- Author: Wendy Doniger
- Language: English
- Subject: Hinduism
- Publisher: Viking Press; Speaking Tiger Books (in India)
- Publication date: 2009
- Publication place: United States
- Media type: Print
- Pages: 800
- ISBN: 978-0143116691

The Hindus: An Alternative History is a book by American Indologist Wendy Doniger which the author describes as an "alternative to the narrative of Hindu history that they tell". The book was initially published by Viking Penguin in 2009 and later in India by Penguin's Indian subsidiary, Penguin India.

The book was explicitly intended as an alternative history of Hinduism, the mainstream history being (in the author's view) written from male Brahminical and white Orientalist perspectives. Doniger instead portrays the history of Hinduism from the point of view of women, dogs, horses and outcastes in a "playful, iconoclastic, and inherently controversial" style.

The book was criticized in India, and in February 2014 it was the subject of litigation in India for "deliberate and malicious acts intended to outrage the feelings of any religious community". As a result of the lawsuit, the book was withdrawn from the Indian market by its Indian publisher, prompting widespread concerns about the state of free speech in India. Twenty months later, the book returned to the Indian market under a different publisher, Speaking Tiger Books.

== Reception ==
According to the Hindustan Times, The Hindus was a No. 1 bestseller in its non-fiction category in the week of October 15, 2009. Two scholarly reviews in the Social Scientist and the Journal of the American Oriental Society, though praising Doniger for her textual scholarship, criticized factual errors in her coverage of British colonialists in India and her lack of focus.

In the popular press, the book has received many positive reviews, for example from the Library Journal, the Times Literary Supplement, the New York Review of Books, the New York Times, and The Hindu.

In January 2010, the National Book Critics Circle named The Hindus as a finalist for its 2009 book awards.

The Hindu American Foundation, a Hindutva organization affiliated with the Sangh Parivar, protested this decision, alleging inaccuracies and bias in the book. Bharat Gupt, defending Indigenous Aryanist views, criticised her book, stating that Doniger misunderstands the meaning of myths by focusing too much on the gap between fictional and factual history, and aiming to show how oppressive power-structures are perpetuated in the Sanskrit-oriented mythology. According to Gupt, Doniger's analysis is politically motivated, and aligned with a left-wing and Marxist agenda. (Note: According to Gupt, Doniger has a distorted understanding of factual history as she aims to show how religion is shaped by cultural and historical forces, and how Hindu-mythology reflects the power-imbalance between Brahmins and suppressed groups. Gupt also objects to Doniger's view of Sanskrit as a tool of oppression by the Brahmanical elite, whose culture subjugated local traditions. Referring to the acceptance of the existence of past Indo-Aryan migrations as a belief in "Aryan invasion theory", Gupt questions Doniger's view on the Indus Valley Civilisation as being unrelated to the Vedic culture brought to India by the Indo-Aryans (as is the common scholarly view).)

== Court case in India ==
While scholarly and popular reviews were by and large positive, it quickly drew much ire in the Indian blogosphere and the internet more generally, following what Taylor calls "a decade of bad blood, flaming, and hurtful personal attacks" following the publication of Kali's Child and several other controversial works.

The book was criticised by Shiksha Bachao Andolan Samithi (transl. "Committee for Struggle to Save Education"), founded by Dinanath Batra, affiliated with the Hindutva paramilitary organization Rashtriya Swayamsevak Sangh, arguing that the work was "riddled with heresies" and that the contents were allegedly offensive to Hindus. In 2011, he filed a lawsuit under Section 295A of Indian Penal Code, which forbids deliberate and malicious acts intended to outrage the feelings of any religious community, and in February 2014, it was the subject of litigation in India. The book was withdrawn from the Indian market by its Indian publisher, Penguin India, who agreed to destroy all the existing copies within six months commencing from February 2014.

There was a Streisand effect on the sales of the book and its sales effectively increased. Some bookstores continued to secretly sell the book, wrapped in brown paper.

The publishers blamed the "British vintage Section 295A of IPC" for withdrawal of the books and felt that it was difficult to maintain international standards of free speech in light of this section. The decision to withdraw the book was widely criticised and certain thinkers felt that Penguin should have defended the case effectively and upheld freedom of expression. Widespread concerns were raised about the state of free speech in India.

According to plaintiff attorney Monika Arora, she merely asked the publisher Penguin to fix errors in the book. Arora says the withdrawal of the book by Penguin India and subsequent republishing under a different publisher was a scheme to avoid addressing factual errors in court.

== See also ==
- Censorship by religion
- Censorship in India
- Censorship in South Asia
- Freedom of speech
- Religious intolerance
