= Ken Jones (Buddhist) =

Welsh Buddhist activist, poet, and teacher

- Title: Buddhist Author and Activist

Personal life
- Born: Kenneth Henry Jones; 18 May 1930 Wales
- Died: 2 August 2015 (aged 85)
- Website: www.kenjoneszen.com

Religious life
- Religion: Buddhism

Senior posting
- Teacher: Sheng-yen

Kenneth Henry Jones (18 May 1930 – 2 August 2015) was a Welsh Buddhist activist, poet, and teacher. He was considered an important voice in socially engaged Buddhism.

== Biography ==
Born in Wales, Jones spent much of his career in higher learning. As an anarchist, Jones had at different times been associated with Communist Party of Great Britain, the Labour Party (Victory for Socialism Group) and the UK Green Party.

As a proponent of socially engaged Buddhism, Jones was a founder of the UK Network of Socially Engaged Buddhists and was a member of the International Advisory Committee of the Buddhist Peace Fellowship. He also authored The New Social Face of Buddhism: A Call to Action considered important book on socially engaged Buddhism.

Jones taught at the Western Chan Fellowship and was in the lineage of Sheng-yen. He won many prizes for his poetry.

He died in August 2015 after a long battle with prostate cancer.

== Bibliography ==
- Jones, Ken (2003). The New Social Face of Buddhism: A Call to Action. Wisdom Publications. ISBN 0-86171-365-6.
