= Electoral history of Rishi Sunak =

Elections featuring UK Prime Minister

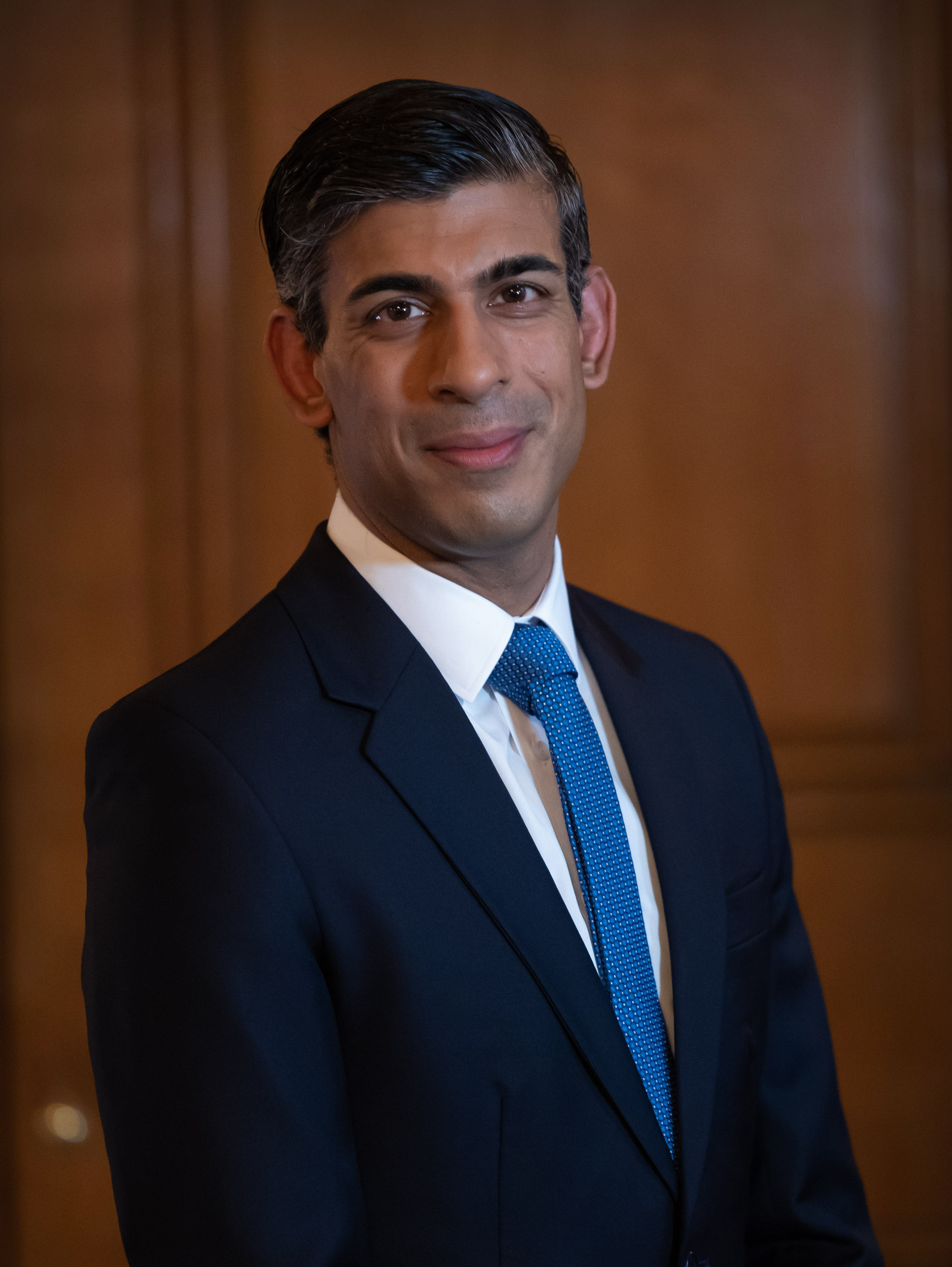
Prime ministerial portrait, 2022

This is a summary of the electoral history of Rishi Sunak, the Leader of the Conservative Party who served as Prime Minister of the United Kingdom from October 2022 to July 2024. Sunak previously served as Chancellor of the Exchequer from 2020 to 2022, and was the MP for Richmond (Yorks) from 2015 to 2024. Following boundary changes, Sunak's seat was abolished, and was reformed as Richmond and Northallerton; first contested at the 2024 general election with Sunak as the Conservative candidate.

== Parliamentary elections ==
=== 2015 general election, Richmond (Yorks) ===
General election 2015: Richmond (Yorks)
Party	Candidate	Votes	%	±%
Conservative	Rishi Sunak	27,744	51.4	―11.4
UKIP	Matthew Cooke	8,194	15.2	New
Labour	Mike Hill	7,124	13.2	―2.1
Liberal Democrats	John Harris	3,465	6.4	―12.7
Independent	John Blackie	3,348	6.2	New
Green	Leslie Rowe	2,313	4.3	+1.5
Independent	Robin Scott	1,811	3.4	New
Majority		19,550	36.2	―7.5
Turnout		53,999	64.7	―2.5
Conservative hold		Swing	―13.3	

=== 2017 general election, Richmond (Yorks) ===
General election 2017: Richmond (Yorks)
Party	Candidate	Votes	%	±%
Conservative	Rishi Sunak	36,458	63.9	+12.5
Labour	Dan Perry	13,350	23.4	+10.2
Liberal Democrats	Tobie Abel	3,360	5.9	−0.5
Yorkshire	Chris Pearson	2,106	3.7	New
Green	Fiona Yorke	1,739	3.1	−1.2
Majority		23,108	40.5	+4.3
Turnout		57,013	70.5	+5.8
Conservative hold		Swing	+1.2	

=== 2019 general election, Richmond (Yorks) ===
General election 2019: Richmond (Yorks)
Party	Candidate	Votes	%	±%
Conservative	Rishi Sunak	36,693	63.6	−0.3
Labour	Thomas Kirkwood	9,483	16.4	−7.0
Liberal Democrats	Philip Knowles	6,989	12.1	+6.2
Green	John Yorke	2,500	4.3	+1.2
Yorkshire	Laurence Waterhouse	1,077	1.9	−1.8
Independent	Nick Jardine	961	1.7	New
Majority		27,210	47.2	+6.7
Turnout		57,703	69.9	−0.6
Conservative hold		Swing	+3.3	

=== 2024 general election, Richmond and Northallerton ===
General election 2024: Richmond and Northallerton
Party	Candidate	Votes	%	±%
Conservative	Rishi Sunak	23,059	47.5	−15.8
Labour	Tom Wilson	10,874	22.4	6.0
Reform	Lee Taylor	7,142	14.7	New
Liberal Democrats	Daniel Callaghan	4,322	8.9	−3.6
Green	Kevin Foster	2,058	4.2	0.4
Count Binface Party	Count Binface	308	0.6	New
Independent	Brian Richmond	222	0.5	New
Independent	Niko Omilana	160	0.3	New
Yorkshire	Rio Goldhammer	132	0.3	−1.8
Monster Raving Loony	Sir Archibald Stanton	99	0.2	New
Workers Party	Louise Dickens	90	0.2	New
Independent	Angie Campion	33	0.1	New
Independent	Jason Barnett	27	0.1	New
Majority		12,185		
Turnout		73,888	66	−5.6

== July–September 2022 Conservative Party leadership election ==
Candidate	MPs' 1st ballot: 13 July 2022		MPs' 2nd ballot: 14 July 2022			MPs' 3rd ballot: 18 July 2022			MPs' 4th ballot: 19 July 2022			MPs' 5th ballot: 20 July 2022			Members' vote 22 July to 2 September 2022		
Candidate	Votes	%	Votes	±	%	Votes	±	%	Votes	±	%	Votes	±	%	Votes	%	% Votes cast
Liz Truss	50	14.0	64	+14	17.9	71	+7	19.8	86	+15	24.1	113	+27	31.6	81,326	47.2	57.4
Rishi Sunak	88	24.6	101	+13	28.2	115	+14	32.1	118	+3	33.1	137	+19	38.3	60,399	35.0	42.6
Penny Mordaunt	67	18.7	83	+16	23.2	82	−1	22.9	92	+10	25.8	105	+13	29.3	Eliminated		
Kemi Badenoch	40	11.2	49	+9	13.7	58	+9	16.2	59	+1	16.5	Eliminated					
Tom Tugendhat	37	10.3	32	−5	8.9	31	−1	8.7	Eliminated								
Suella Braverman	32	8.9	27	−5	7.5	Eliminated											
Nadhim Zahawi	25	7.0	Eliminated														
Jeremy Hunt	18	5.0	Eliminated														
Votes cast (Note: Due to rounding errors the sum of percentages may deviate.)	357	99.7	356	−1	99.4	357	+1	99.7	355	−2	99.4	355	0	99.2	141,725	82.2	100
Spoilt ballots	0	0.0	0	0	0.0	0	0	0.0	1	+1	0.3	2	+1	0.6	654	0.4	
Abstentions	1	0.3	2	+1	0.6	1	−1	0.3	1	0	0.3	1	0	0.3	30,058	17.4	
Registered voters	358	100.0	358	0	100.0	358	0	100.0	357	−1	100.0	358	+1	100.0	172,437	100.0	

== October 2022 Conservative Party leadership election ==
Endorsements of Conservative MPs Rishi Sunak Boris Johnson Penny Mordaunt No endorsement No Conservative MP

MP public endorsements
Candidate	Endorsements	%
Rishi Sunak	197	55.1
Boris Johnson	62	17.3
Penny Mordaunt	27	7.5
No endorsement	71	19.8

Note: Some endorsements are repeated due to MPs changing support after withdrawal.

== 2024 United Kingdom general election ==
The Labour Party under Keir Starmer won a landslide general election victory against the Conservatives under Rishi Sunak.

Affiliate	Leader	MPs		Aggregate votes	
Affiliate	Leader		Of total		Of total
Labour Party	Keir Starmer	411 (Note: Includes 43 MPs sponsored by the Co-operative Party, who are designated Labour and Co-operative.)	63.2%	9,708,716	34.7%
Conservative Party	Rishi Sunak	121	18.6%	6,828,925	23.7%
Liberal Democrats	Ed Davey	72	11.1%	3,519,143	12.2%
Scottish National Party	John Swinney	9	1.4%	724,758	2.5%
Sinn Féin	Mary Lou McDonald	7	1.1%	210,891	0.7%
Independent	—N/a	6	0.9%	564,243	2.0%
Reform UK	Nigel Farage	5	0.8%	4,117,610	14.3%
Democratic Unionist Party	Gavin Robinson	5	0.8%	172,058	0.6%
Green Party of England and Wales	Carla Denyer; Adrian Ramsay	4	0.6%	1,841,888	6.4%
Plaid Cymru	Rhun ap Iorwerth	4	0.6%	194,811	0.7%
Social Democratic and Labour Party	Colum Eastwood	2	0.3%	86,861	0.3%
Alliance Party of Northern Ireland	Naomi Long	1	0.2%	117,191	0.4%
Ulster Unionist Party	Doug Beattie	1	0.2%	94,779	0.3%
Traditional Unionist Voice	Jim Allister	1	0.2%	48,685	0.2%
Speaker	Lindsay Hoyle	1	0.2%	25,238	0.1%
