= Harvard Oriental Series =

The Harvard Oriental Series is a book series founded in 1891 by Charles Rockwell Lanman and Henry Clarke Warren. Lanman served as its inaugural editor (1891–1934) for the first 37 volumes. Other editors of the series include Walter Eugene Clark (1934–1950, volumes 38–44), Daniel Henry Holmes Ingalls (1950–1983, volumes 45–48) and Gary Tubb (1983–1990, volume 49).

Currently in its 93rd volume, the series is edited by Michael Witzel, the Wales Professor of Sanskrit in the Department of Sanskrit and Indian Studies at Harvard University, and distributed by the Harvard University Press. A subseries, Harvard Oriental Series Opera Minora, "aims at the swift publication of important materials that cannot be included in the mainly text-oriented Harvard Oriental Series."

== Volumes of Main Series ==
Volume	Year	Author	Title
1	1891	Hendrik Kern	The Jataka-Mala
2	1895	Richard Garbe	Samkhya-Pravacana-Bhasya
3	1896	Henry Clarke Warren	Buddhism in Translations
4	1901	Sten Konow	Rajasekhara's Karpuramanjari
5 and 6	1904	Arthur Anthony Macdonell	The Bṛhad-devatā attributed to Śaunaka
7 and 8	1905	William Dwight Whitney	Atharva Veda Samhita
9	1905	Arthur William Ryder	Mrcchakatika by Shudraka
10	1906	Maurice Bloomfield	A Vedic Concordance
11	1908	Johannes Hertel	The Panchatantra of Purnabhadra
12	1912	Johannes Hertel	The Panchatantra of Purnabhadra
13	1912	Johannes Hertel	The Panchatantra of Purnabhadra
14	1915	Johannes Hertel	The Panchatantra (Tantrakhyayika)
15	1912	Carl Cappeller	Kiratarjuniya of Bharavi
16	1922	Richard Pischel	Sakuntala of Kalidasa
17	1914	James Haughton Woods	The Yoga-System of Patanjali
18 and 19	1914	Arthur Berriedale Keith	The Veda of the Black Yajus School
20	1916	Maurice Bloomfield	Rig-Veda Repetitions
21	1915	Shripad Krishna Belvalkar	Rama's Later History or Uttara-Rama-Charita by Bhavabhuti
22	NA	Shripad Krishna Belvalkar	Rama's Later History, Part 2
23	NA	Shripad Krishna Belvalkar	Rama's Later History, Part 3
24	1916	Maurice Bloomfield	Rig-Veda Repetitions, Parts 2 and 3
25	1920	Arthur Berriedale Keith	Rigveda Brahmanas
26 and 27	1926	Franklin Edgerton	Vikrama's Adventures
28 and 29 and 30	1921	Eugene Watson Burlingame	Buddhist Legends
31 and 32	1925	Arthur Berriedale Keith	The Religion and Philosophy of the Veda and Upanishads
33 and 34 and 35	1951	Karl Friedrich Geldner	Der Rig-Veda
36	1957	Karl Friedrich Geldner	Der Rig-Veda
37	1932	Robert Chalmers	Buddha's Teachings
38 and 39	1944	Franklin Edgerton	The Bhagavad Gita
40	1951	Daniel Henry Holmes Ingalls	Navya-Nyāya Logic
41	1950	Henry Clarke Warren & Dharmananda Damodar Kosambi	Visuddhimagga of Buddhaghosa
42	1957	D. D. Kosambi and V. V. Gokhale	Subhasitaratnakosa by Vidyakara
43	1958	W. Norman Brown	Saundaryalahari of Sankaracarya
44	1965	Daniel Henry Holmes Ingalls	Vidyakara's Subhasitaratnakosa
45	1965	Richard Nelson Frye	The Histories of Nishapur
46	1968	Bimal Krishna Matilal	Navya-Nyāya Philosophy
47	1968	Hattori Masaaki	Dignaga's Pramanasamuccaya
48	1978	David Pingree	The Yavanajataka of Sphujidhvaja
49	1990	Daniel Henry Holmes Ingalls, Jeffrey Moussaieff Masson and M. V. Patwardhan	The Dhvanyaloka of Anandavardhana
50	1994	Barend A. van Nooten and Gary Holland	Rig Veda
51	1996	Gurinder Singh Mann	The Goindval Pothis
52	1997	Madhav Deshpande	Saunakiya Caturadhyayika
53	1998	V. Raghavan	The Srngaraprakasa of Bhoja, Part 1
54	NA	NA	The Srngaraprakasa of Bhoja, Part 2
55	1998	Gregory G. Maskarinec	Nepalese Shaman Oral Texts, I
56	1999	Edward C. Dimock Jr.	Caitanya Caritamrta of Krsnadasa Kaviraja
57	Example	B. R. Sharma	The Samaveda Samhita, Volume 1
58	NA	B. R. Sharma	The Samaveda Samhita, Volume 2
59	NA	B. R. Sharma	The Samaveda Samhita, Volume 3
60	2002	Olle Qvarnström	The Yogasastra of Hemacandra
61	2002	Madhav Deshpande	Saunakiya Atharvaveda
62	2003	Iravatham Mahadevan	Early Tamil Epigraphy
63	2003	Karl Friedrich Geldner	Rig-Veda
64	2008	Kurtis R. Schaeffer and Leonard van der Kuijp	An Early Tibetan Survey of Buddhist Literature
65	2004	Michael Witzel	Katha Aranyaka
66	2008	Marco Franceschini	A New Vedic Concordance
67	2007	Todd T. Lewis and Subarna Man Tuladhar	Sugatasaurabha by Chittadhar Hridaya
68	2008	Gregory G. Maskarinec	Nepalese Shaman Oral Texts, II
69	2008	Karen H. Ebert and Martin Gaenszle	Rai Mythology
70	2008	Malcolm David Eckel	Bhaviveka and His Buddhist Opponents
71	2008	Lawrence J. McCrea	The Teleology of Poetics in Medieval Kashmir
72	2010	Dragomir Dimitrov	The Bhaiksuki Manuscript of the Candralamkara
73	2009	Patrick Olivelle	Vishnu Smriti
74	2012	Lorenz G. Löffler	Ethnographic Notes on the Mru and Khumi of the Chittagong and Arakan Hill Tracts: A Contribution to our Knowledge of South and Southeast Asian Indigenous Peoples mainly based on field research in the Southern Chittagong Hill Tracts
75	2013	Ulrich Timme Kragh	The Foundation for Yoga Practitioners: The Buddhist Yogācārabhūmi Treatise and Its Adaptation in India, East Asia, and Tibet
76	2013	Jeanne Hein and V.S. Rajam	The Earliest Missionary Grammar of Tamil: Fr. Henriques' Arte da Lingua Malabar: Translation, History, and Analysis
77	2015	David Brick	Brahmanical Theories of the Gift: A Critical Edition and Annotated Translation of the Dānakānda of the Krtyakalpataru
78	2015	Olle Qvarnström	Bhāviveka on Sāmkhya and Vedānta: The Sāmkhya and Vedānta Chapters of the Madhyamakahrdayakārikā and Tarkajvālā
79	2015	Tarun Chhabra	The Toda Landscape: Explorations in Cultural Ecology
80	2015	Georg Buddruss and Almuth Degener	Materialien zur Prasun-Sprache des Afghanischen Hindukusch, Teil I: Texte und Glossar
81	2016	Jonathan A. Silk	Materials Toward the Study of Vasubandhu’s Viṁśikā (I): Sanskrit and Tibetan Critical Editions of the Verses and Autocommentary; An English Translation and Annotations
82	2016	Maho Iuchi	An Early Text on the History of Rwa sgreng Monastery: The Rgyal ba’i dben gnas rwa sgreng gi bshad pa nyi ma’i ’od zer of ’Brom Shes rab me lce
83	2016	John Stratton Hawley	Into Sūr’s Ocean: Poetry, Context, and Commentary
84	2016	Buddruss, Georg and Degener, Almuth	Materialien zur Prasun-Sprache des Afghanischen Hindukusch, Teil II: Grammatik
85	2018	Kṣemendra, Sahaja Bhaṭṭa, and Michael Witzel	Lokaprakāśa by Kṣemendra with the commentary of Sahaja Bhaṭṭa, Volume 1
86 and 87	2018	Simon Strickland	Materials for the Study of Gurung Pe, volumes I-II
88	2019	Jana Fortier	A Comparative Dictionary of Raute and Rawat: Tibeto-Burman Languages of the Central Himalayas
89	2018	Arthur McKeown	Guardian of a Dying Flame: Śāriputra (c. 1335–1426) and the End of Late Indian Buddhism
90	2018	Kṣemendra, Sahaja Bhaṭṭa, and Michael Witzel	Lokaprakāśa by Kṣemendra with the commentary of Sahaja Bhaṭṭa, Volume 2
91	2019	Howard Resnick	Vaikhānasa-mantra-praśna V-VIII : (Daivikacatuṣṭayam)
92	2018	Michael Witzel	The Two Oldest Veda Manuscripts: Facsimile Edition of Vājasaneyi Saṃhitā 1–20 (Saṃhitā- and Padapāṭha) from Nepal and Western Tibet (c. 1150 CE)
93	2018	Martin Gaenszle	Ritual Speech in the Himalayas: Oral Texts and Their Contexts

== Volumes of Opera Minora subseries ==
Volume	Year	Author	Title
1	1996	edited by Enrica Garzilli	Translating, Translations, Translators : From India to the West
2	1997	edited by Michael Witzel	Inside the Texts, Beyond the Texts : New Approaches to the Study of the Vedas : Proceedings of the International Vedic Workshop, Harvard University, June 1989
3	1999	edited by Johannes Bronkhorst and Madhav M. Deshpande	Aryan and Non-Aryan in South Asia : Evidence, Interpretation, and Ideology : Proceedings of the International Seminar on Aryan and Non-Aryan in South Asia, University of Michigan, Ann Arbor, 25–27 October 1996
4	2002	Alexander Lubotsky	Atharaveda-paippalada, Kanda Five : Text, Translation, Commentary
5	2007	Mohan Prasad Khanal and Theodore Riccardi, Jr.	Archaeological Excavations in the Kathmandu Valley : a Report on the 1984–85 and 1988-89 Seasons at Dumakhal
6	2010	Carlos A. Lopez	Atharvaveda-paippalada : Kāṇḍas Thirteen and Fourteen
7	2011	Toshiki Osada and Michael Witzel	Cultural Relations Between the Indus and the Iranian Plateau During the Third Millennium BCE : Indus Project, Research Institute for Humanities and Nature, June 7–8, 2008
8	2012	Toshiki Osada	Language Atlas of South Asia : Indus Project, Research Institute for Humanities and Nature, Kyoto
9	2016	edited by Jan E. M. Houben, Julieta Rotaru & Michael Witzel	Vedic Śākhās : Past, Present, Future : Proceeding of the Fifth International Vedic Workshop, Bucharest 2011
10			[volume 10 not yet published]
11	2019	Nawaraj Chaulagain	Hindu Kingship Rituals: Power Relation and Historical Evolution
12	2020	Amruta Chintaman Natu	Georg Bühler's Contribution to Indology

== See also ==
- Columbia University Indo-Iranian Series
- Loeb Classical Library
- Murty Classical Library of India
