= Walter Eugene Clark =

- Born: Walter Eugene Clark; September 8, 1881; Digby, Nova Scotia
- Died: September 30, 1960 (aged 79); Vista, California

Walter Eugene Clark (September 8, 1881 – September 30, 1960), was an American philologist. He was the second Wales Professor of Sanskrit at Harvard University and editor of the volumes 38-44 of the Harvard Oriental Series. He translated the Aryabhatiya of Aryabhata with critical notes which was published in 1930, by the University of Chicago Press.

== Education ==
Clark was born on September 8, 1881, in Digby, Nova Scotia, and came to the United States in 1883.

Clark received his A.B. in 1903, A.M. in 1904 from Harvard. After receiving his Doctorate from Harvard in 1906, with the dissertation titled "Quid de rebus Indicis scirent Graeci prisci quaeritur" he went to Germany to Berlin to receive further training under the Indologist Richard Pischel.

He joined the "Department of Comparative Philology" at University of Chicago as the "Instructor in Sanskrit". In 1915, he was promoted to Assistant Professor of the "Department of Comparative Philology, General Linguistics, and Indo-Iranian Philology" and from 1923 to 1927 as Associate Professor of Sanskrit.

In 1927 he became the Wales Professor of Sanskrit at Harvard. He held the position until his retirement in 1950. He was the editor of the volumes 38-44 of the Harvard Oriental Series after Charles Lanman.

He was a member of the American Oriental Society, the American Academy of Arts and Sciences, the Linguistic Society of America, the Royal Asiatic Society, and the Société Asiatique. Among his other positions he was appointed the second Master of the Kirkland House (1935–46) on September 1, 1935, succeeding Edward A. Whitney.

== Bibliography ==
- Walter Eugene Clark (1933). India. Open Court Publishing Company.

Academic offices
Preceded by Charles Rockwell Lanman	Wales Professor of Sanskrit Harvard University; 1927 - 1950	Succeeded by Daniel Henry Holmes Ingalls
