= Daniel Ingalls =

Daniel Ingalls may refer to:

- Daniel H. H. Ingalls, Sr. (1916–1999), American linguist & academic
- Daniel Henry Holmes Ingalls, Jr. (born 1944), American computer scientist
