= Peter Huybers =

American climatologist (born 1974)

Peter John Huybers
- Education: United States Military Academy (BS); Massachusetts Institute of Technology (PhD)
- Spouse: Downing Lu
- Children: 2
- Scientific career
- Fields: Paleoclimate, Oceanography, Statistics
- Workplaces: Harvard University
- Thesis: On the origins of the ice ages : insolation forcing, age models, and nonlinear climate change (2004)
- Doctoral advisor: Carl Wunsch
- Website: www.people.fas.harvard.edu/~phuybers/

Peter Huybers (born 1974) is an American climate scientist, and Professor of Earth and Planetary Sciences at Harvard University, in the Department of Earth and Planetary Sciences.

== Life and work ==
Peter Huybers received a B.S. in physics in 1996 from the United States Military Academy at West Point, and a Ph.D. in climate chemistry and physics from the Massachusetts Institute of Technology in 2004. He was a NOAA Postdoctoral Fellow in Climate and Global Change in the Geology and Geophysics Department at Woods Hole Oceanographic Institution from 2004 to 2006.

Huybers has multiple research interests related to climate science. First, Huybers is investigating the long-term climate cycles. He has advanced the hypothesis that a 41,000 year period of change connected to the Earth's tilt on its axis is dominant during the past 800,000 years, and that every second or third of these cycles produce a major deglaciation event. This deglaciation also appears to trigger changes in atmospheric carbon dioxide, perhaps in part coming from radically increased volcanic activity during deglaciation. Second, he is studying annual temperature variations. Finally, Huybers is developing models to estimate historic temperatures based on the limited evidence available to us.

Huybers has published in Science, Nature, Geophysical Research Letters, Quaternary Science Reviews, Paleoceanography, Climate of the Past and the Journal of Physical Oceanography.

After completing West Point, his military career included leading a tank platoon as part of peacekeeping operations in Bosnia and testing technologies to reduce friendly fire at the Mounted Warfare Testbed at Fort Knox, Kentucky. Huybers is married to Downing Lu, a military physician assigned to the pediatric intensive care unit at Walter Reed Army Medical Center. The two were appointed as interim deans of Kirkland House, one of Harvard College's twelve undergraduate residential colleges, in June 2025.

== Awards ==
He is the recipient of multiple awards, including a MacArthur Foundation Fellowship in 2009, a Packard Fellowship for Science and Engineering in 2009, the AGU James B. Macelwane Medal in 2009, a Harvard University Center for the Environment Fellowship in 2005, the MIT Carl-Gustaf Rossby Prize in 2004, and a National Defense Science and Engineering Graduate Fellowship in 2001.
