= Kirkland House =

Residential House of Harvard College

- Residential House at Harvard University
- Harvard University
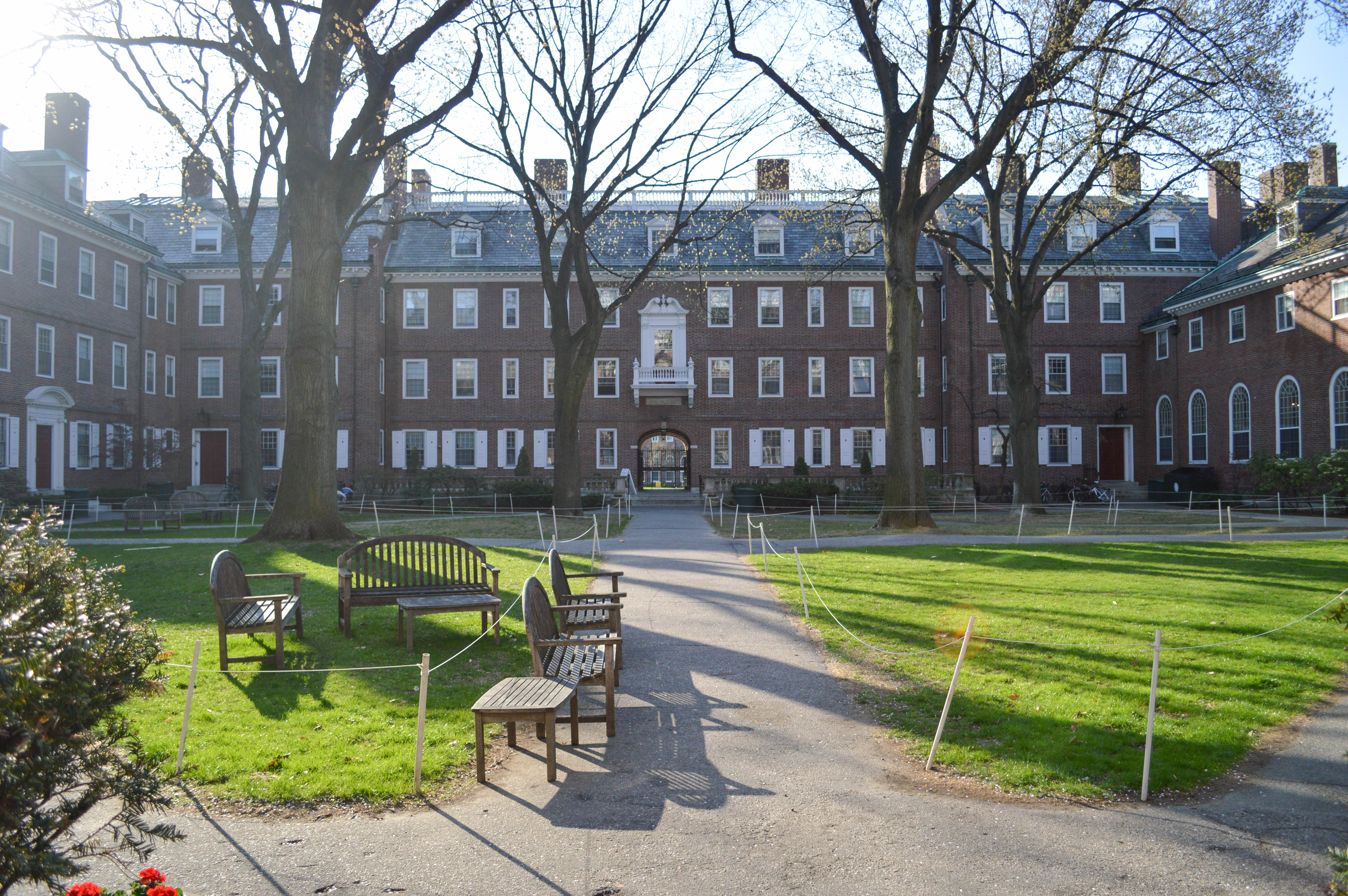
- Kirkland House Courtyard

- Shield
- Location: 95 Dunster Street, Cambridge, Massachusetts, U.S.
- Coordinates: 42°22′15″N 71°07′13″W
- Full name: John Thornton Kirkland House
- Established: 1931; 95 years ago
- Named for: John Thornton Kirkland
- Sister college: Grace Hopper College and Pauli Murray College
- Faculty Deans: Peter Huybers and Downing Lu
- Dean: Jack Huguley
- HoCo chairs: Christopher Bauge and Ella Niederhelman
- Tutors: 20
- Website: kirkland.harvard.edu

Kirkland House is one of twelve undergraduate residential Houses at Harvard University, located near the Charles River in Cambridge, Massachusetts. It was named after John Thornton Kirkland, president of Harvard University from 1810 to 1828.

== Background ==
Some of the buildings were built in 1914 but construction was not completed until 1933. Kirkland is one of the smallest Houses at Harvard, but has nevertheless managed to win many intramural and house-spirit contests, most recently the 2022, 2023, and 2024 Straus Cups. Before Harvard opted to use a lottery system to assign housing to upperclassmen, Kirkland was considered the "jock house" because its location near Anderson Bridge and the Soldiers Field made it a desirable home and convenient place to dine for Harvard athletes.

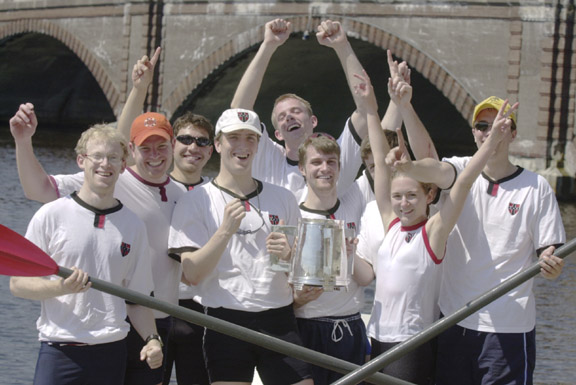
The Kirkland House Boat Club last won the Agassiz Cup in 2003

The first Master of Kirkland House was Edward A. Whitney. Walter Eugene Clark succeeded Whitney as the second Master on September 1, 1935. The title of "House Master" was done away with at Harvard University in 2016 and was replaced with the title "Faculty Dean." In 2025, after faculty dean David Deming was announced as the next dean of Harvard College, Deming and his wife Janine Santimauro announced they would be stepping down as deans of Kirkland House. Harvard climate scientist Peter Huybers and his wife Downing Lu were appointed as interim deans in June 2025.

Kirkland House boasts many traditions, such as its opening ceremony (complete with Minutemen reenactors playing the drums and fife as they process around the House, followed by the house Faculty Deans, tutors, and students), Secret Santa week (an in-house-only series of gifts, jokes, and events) -- accompanied by bawdy skits in the dining hall, and a Holiday Dinner and Dance complete with a mock roast boar. Since the 1930s, the Kirkland Drama Society has put on plays for the house community, and since 2021 it has also hosted a weekly "Choosening" ceremony where a new theme is selected at the start of each week.

Kirkland House has a gym, lounge, game room, meditation room, movie theater, music rooms, and performance and event spaces for students. It also has a wall honoring the history of the Kirkland House Boat Club, which has one of the most decorated records in all of Harvard house rowing. Most recently, head coach Christopher D.H. Row—a resident tutor, art history doctorate and master of divinity—led the KHBC to five consecutive Agassiz Cup victories (1999-2003) and was awarded by the KHBC the title of "Admiral-for-Life" in recognition of that accomplishment. Among the most recent additions is a brewery, operated and maintained by the Kirkland House Brew Club, which occupies the space once used as the house darkroom.

Kirkland House is located four blocks south of Harvard Yard, adjacent to Eliot House, and across Dunster Street from the Malkin Athletic Center.

The House Shield contains a black fess with three white stars on a red field. The stars are drawn from the arms of the many branches of the Kirkland family. The shield previously contained a cross on the arms of the Diocese of Carlisle (where the name Kirkland originated), but due to the shield's perceived resemblance to the Confederate battle flag, a modified design was officially approved by the University and adopted on March 6, 2020.

== Constituent halls ==
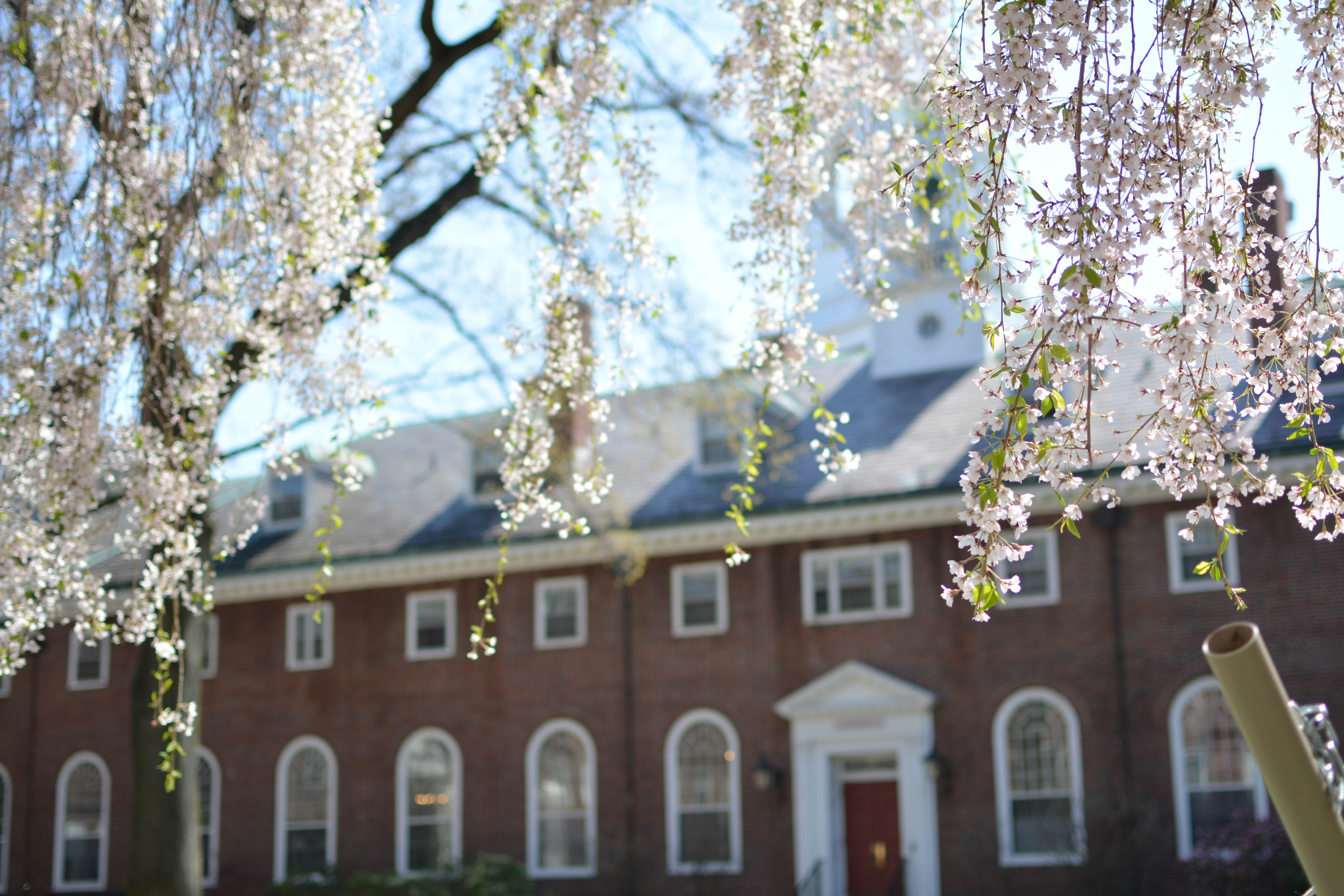
A view facing the Kirkland House dining hall, in May.

Kirkland House comprises the following buildings:

- Smith Halls
- Bryan Hall ("The Annex")
- Faculty Deans' Residence
- Hicks House
- 20 Prescott Street apartments

Smith Halls, which were constructed in 1914 as freshman dormitories; Bryant Hall and the Masters' Residence, both constructed in 1931; and Hicks House, which dates from 1762 and serves as the House Library. Kirkland students also live in the Prescott Street apartments. Located in Smith Halls, the dining hall and Junior Common Room boast magnificent woodwork and high ceilings that highlight Kirkland's classic charm and elegance.

== Notable alumni ==
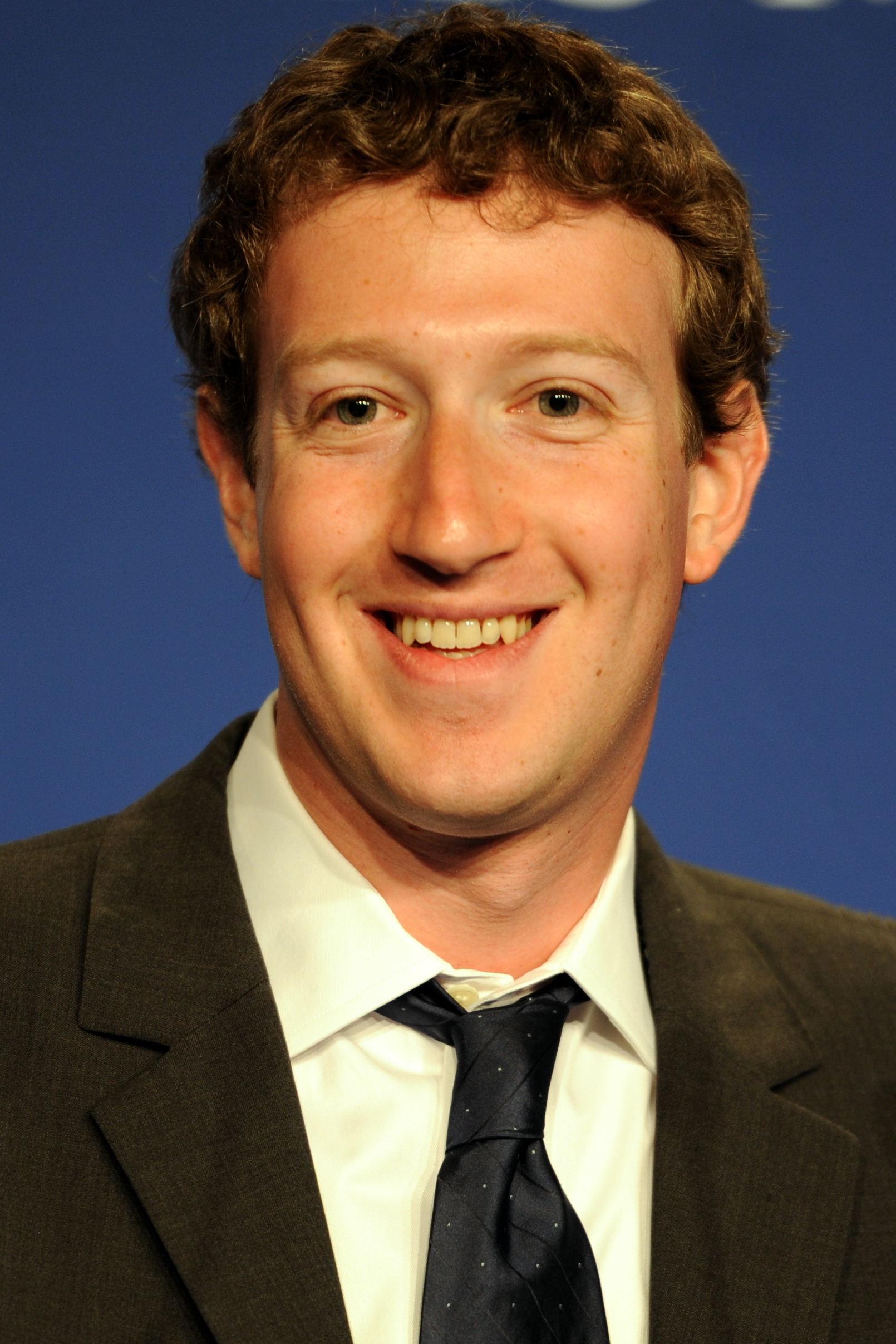
Mark Zuckerberg

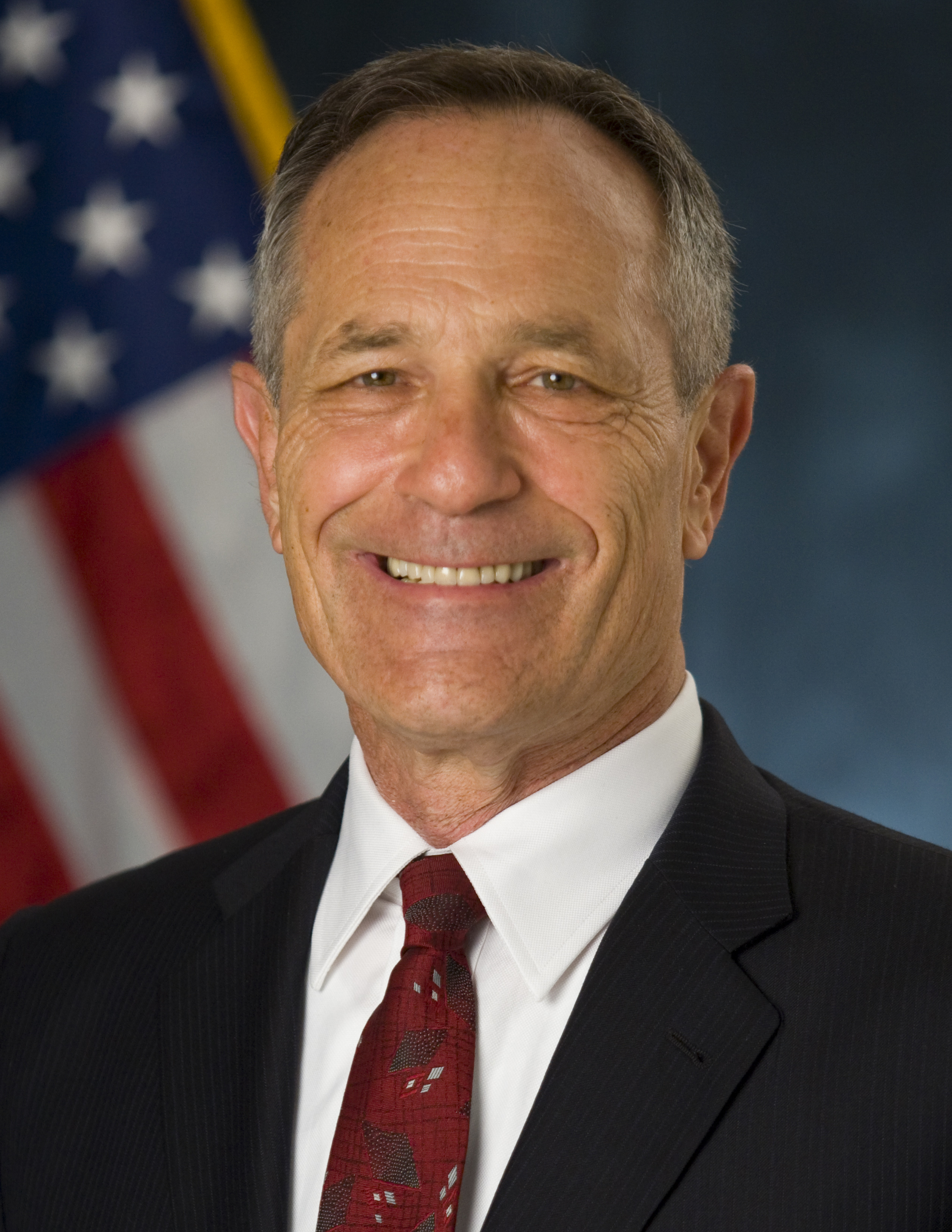
Alan Bersin

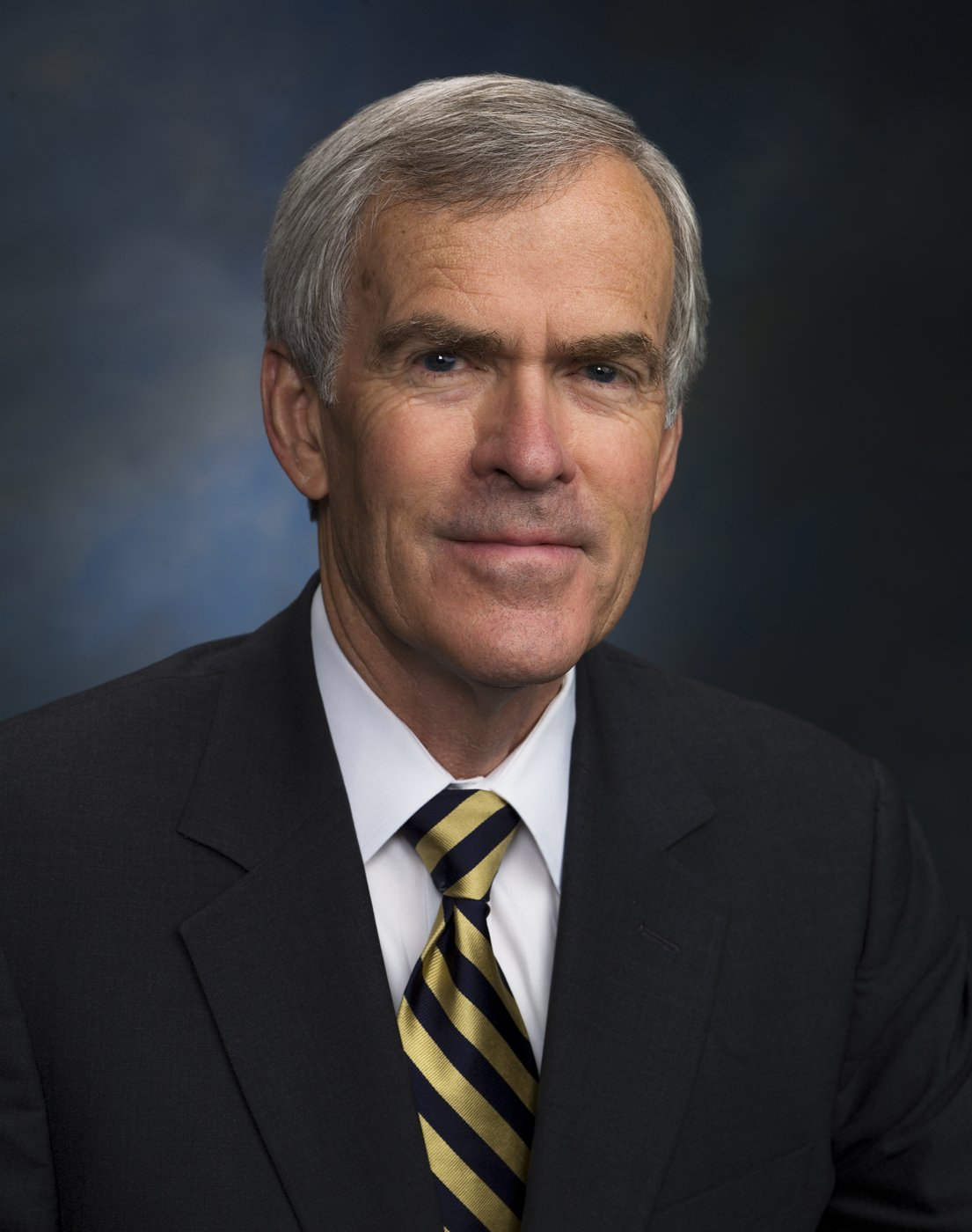
Jeff Bingaman

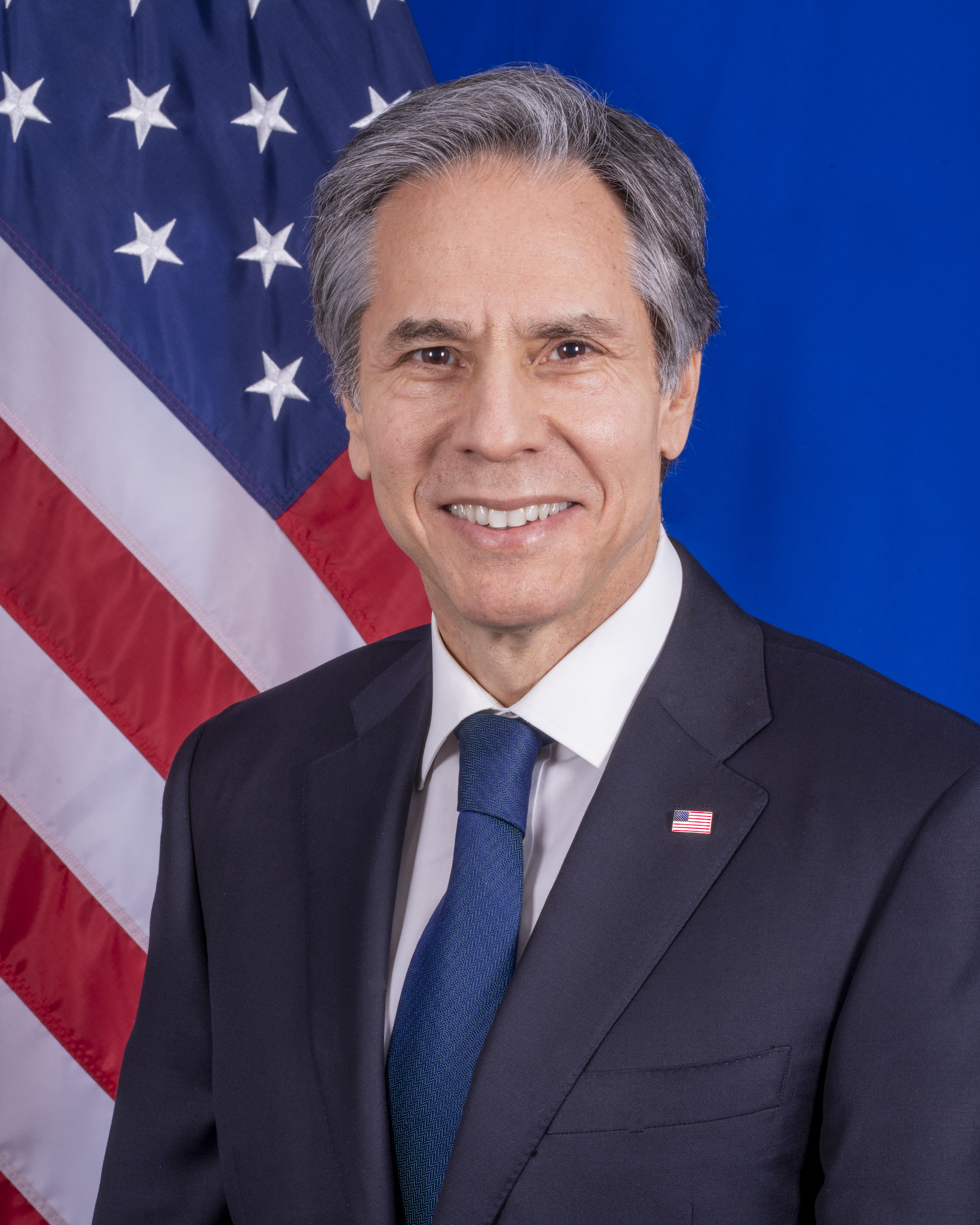
Antony Blinken

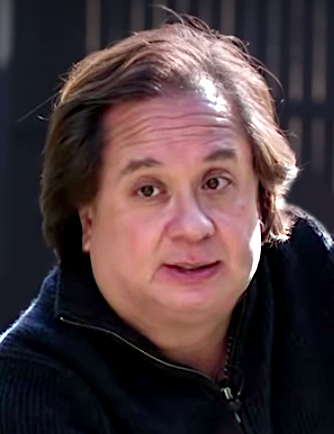
George Conway

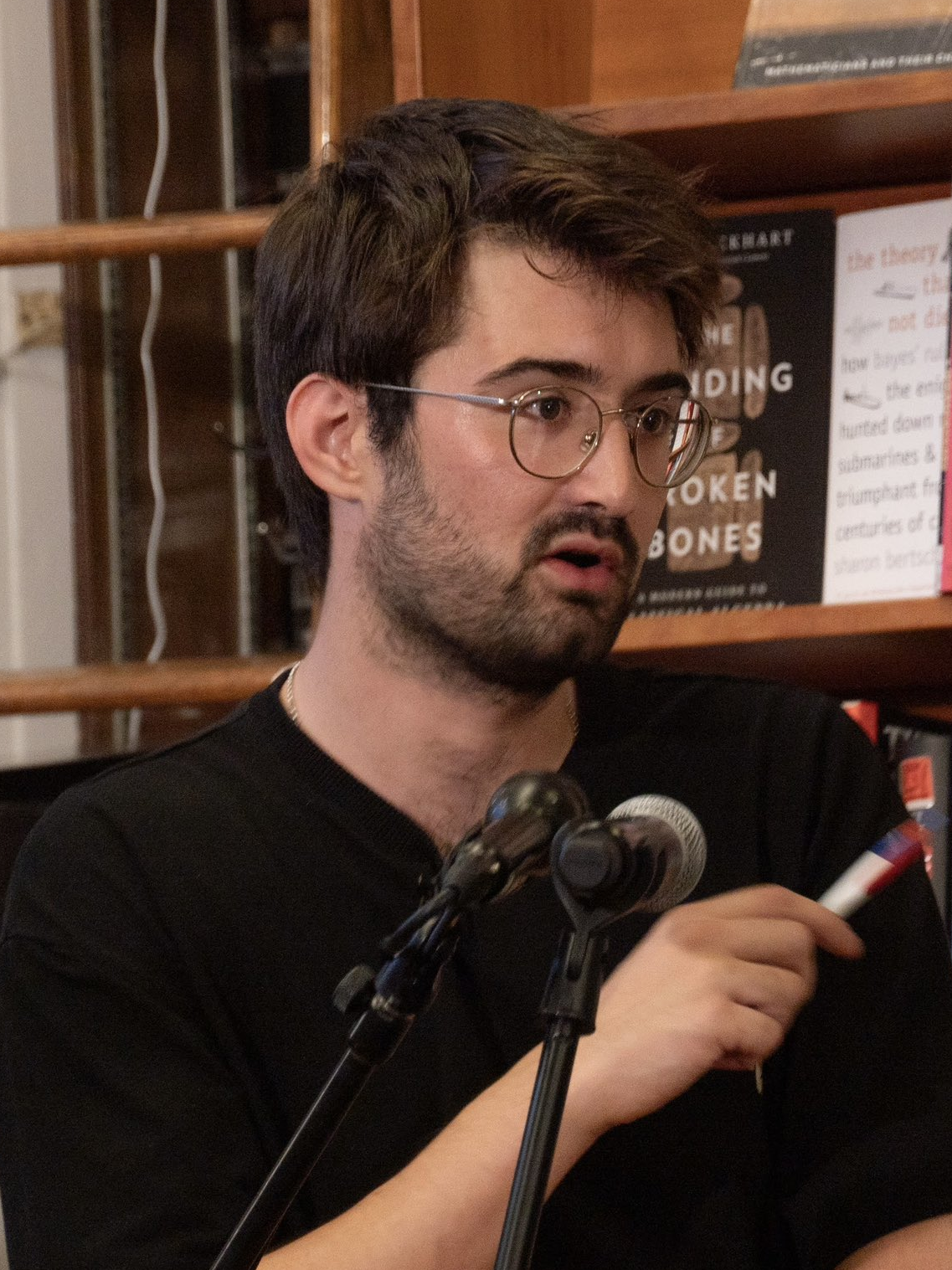
Adam Aleksic

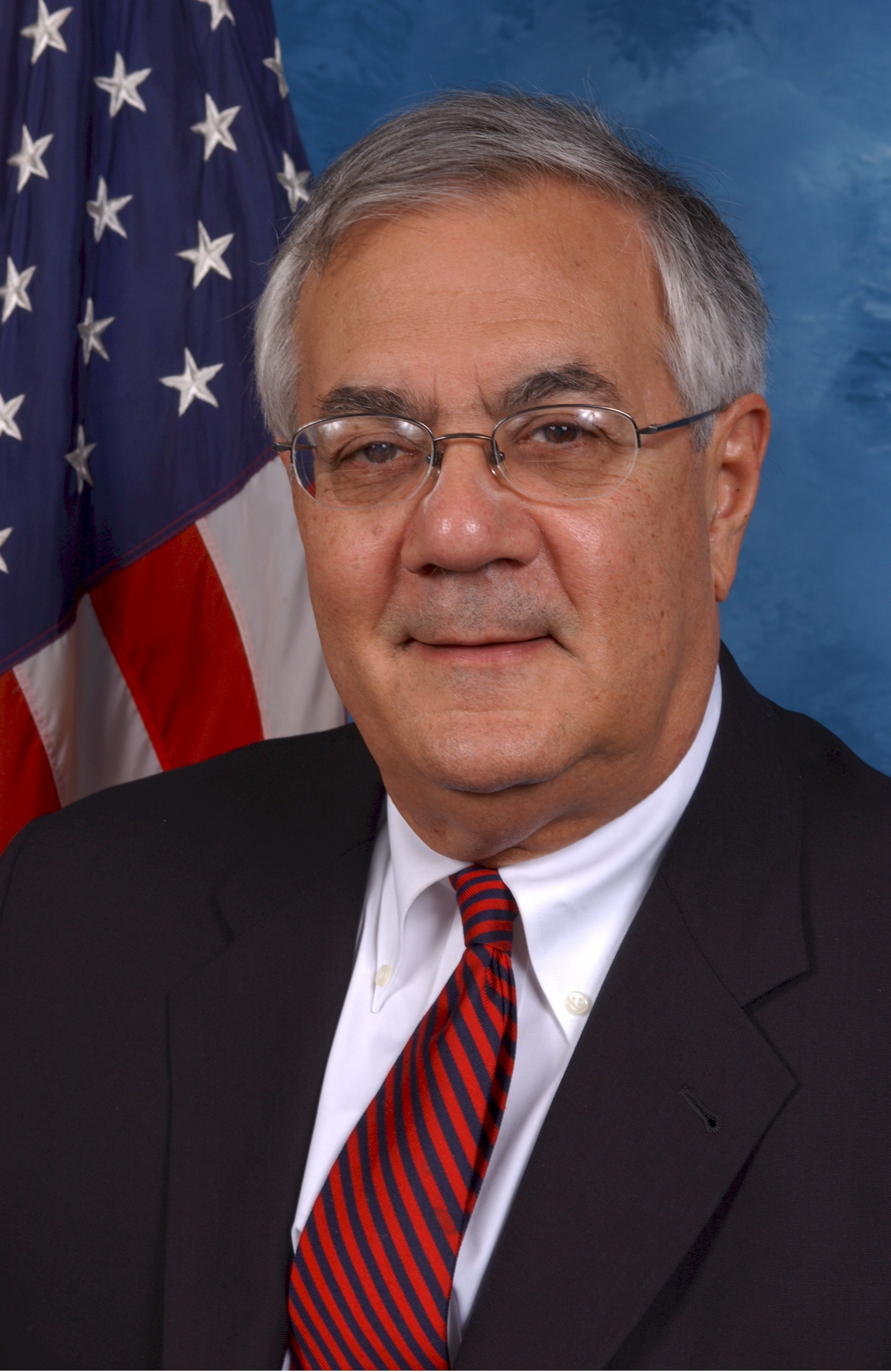
Barney Frank

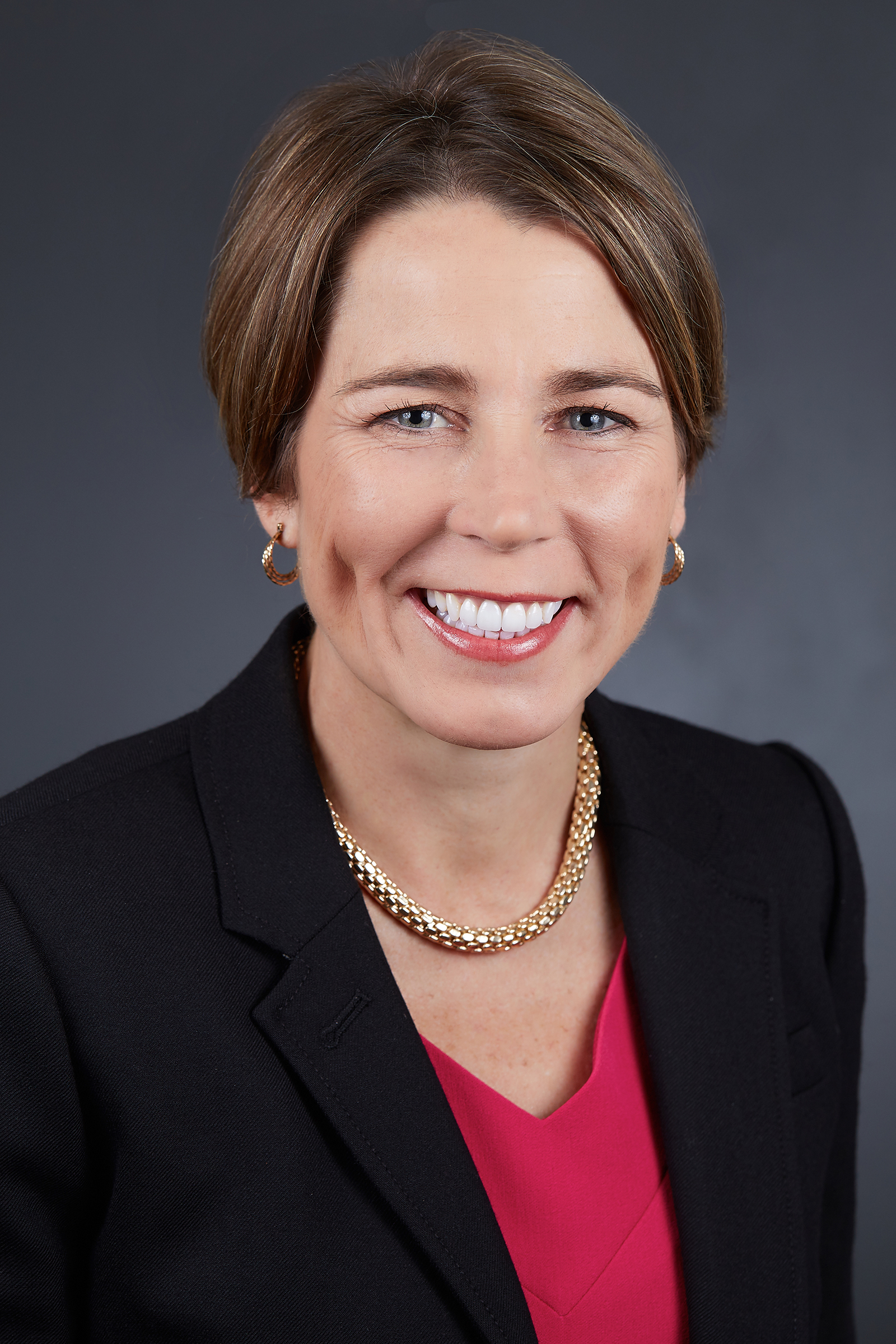
Maura Healey

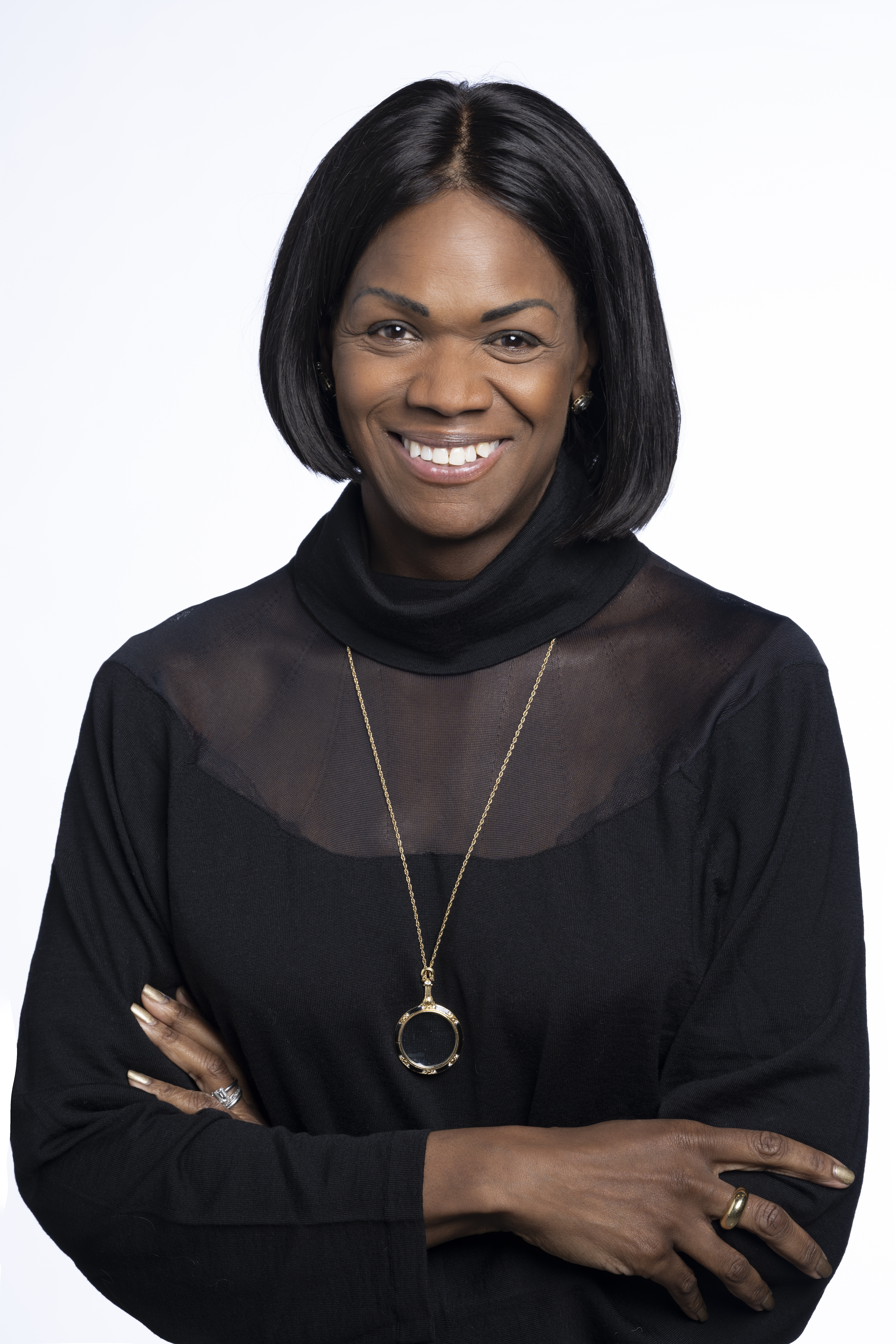
Vivian Hunt

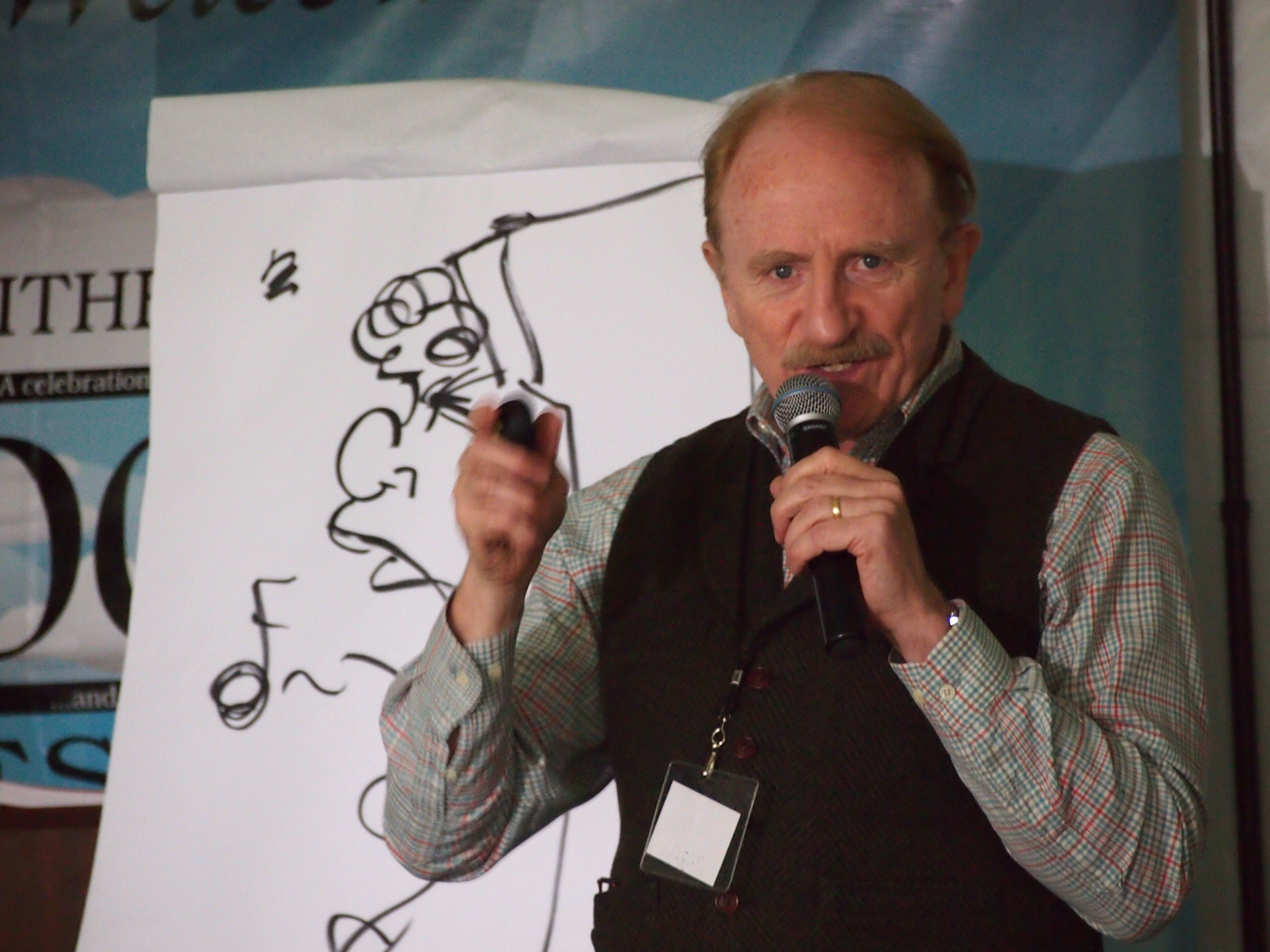
Kevin Kallaugher

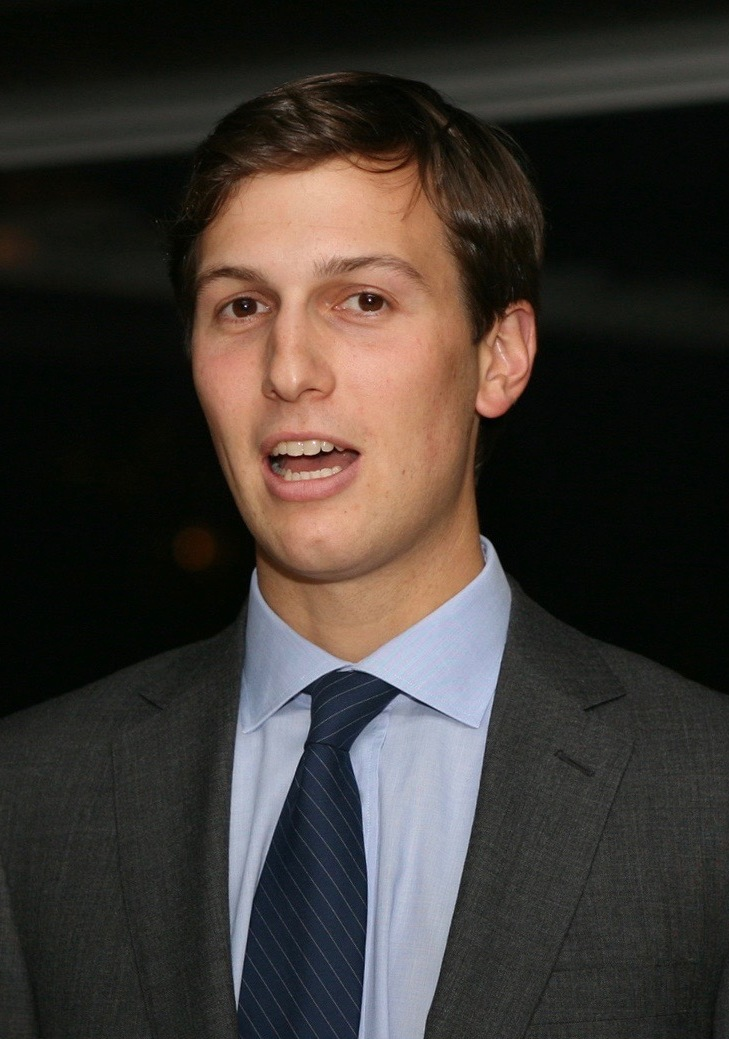
Jared Kushner

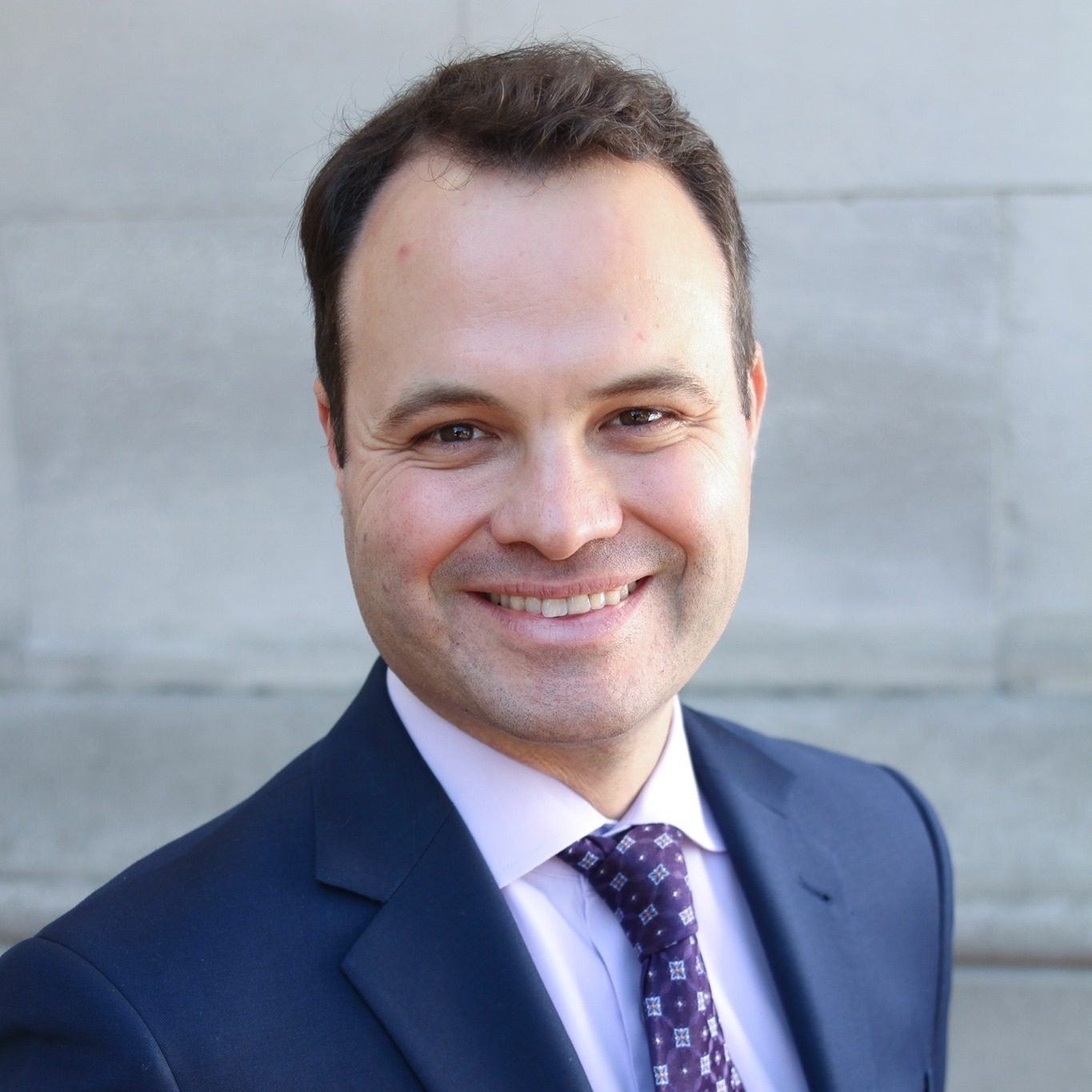
Eric Lesser

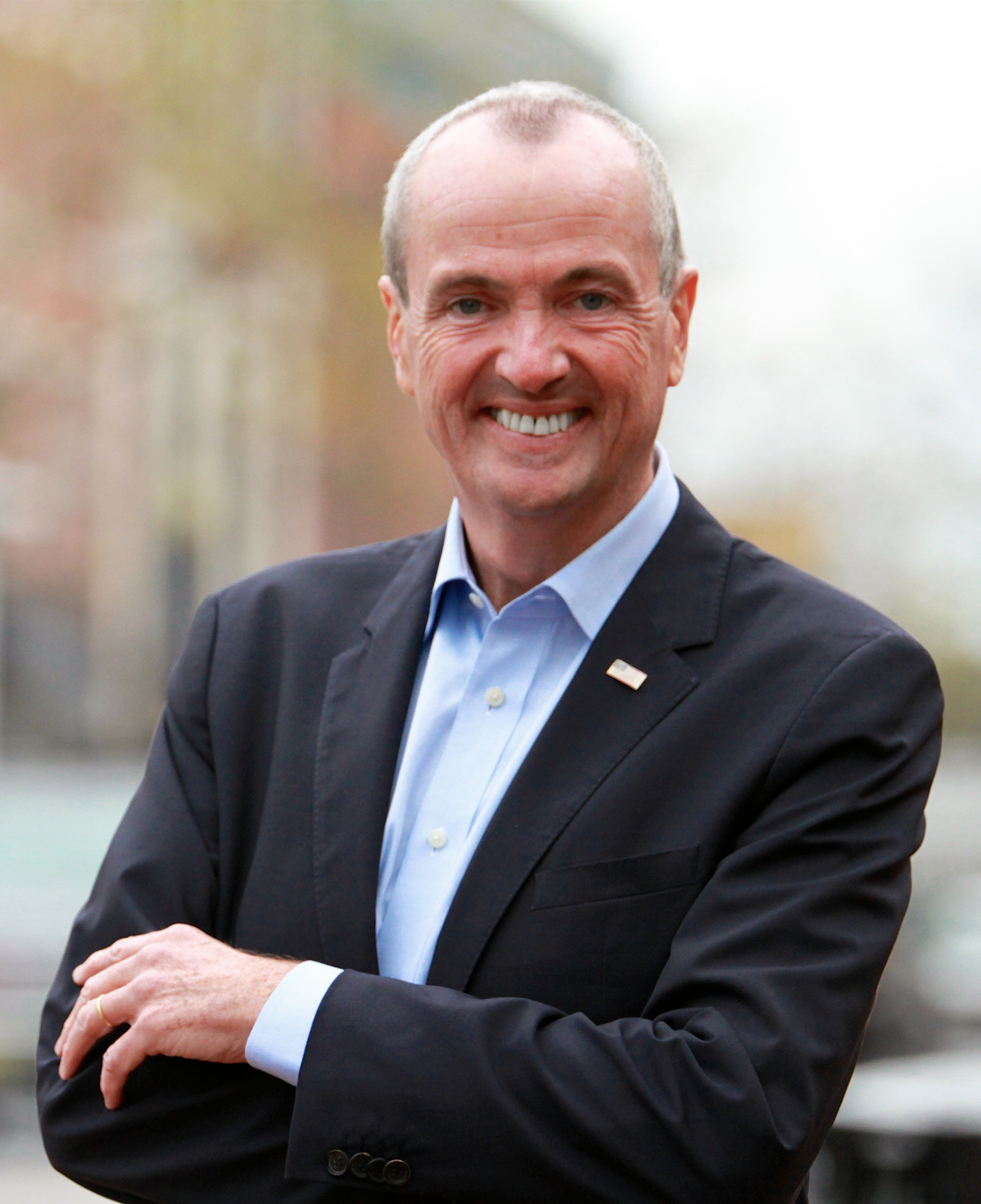
Phil Murphy

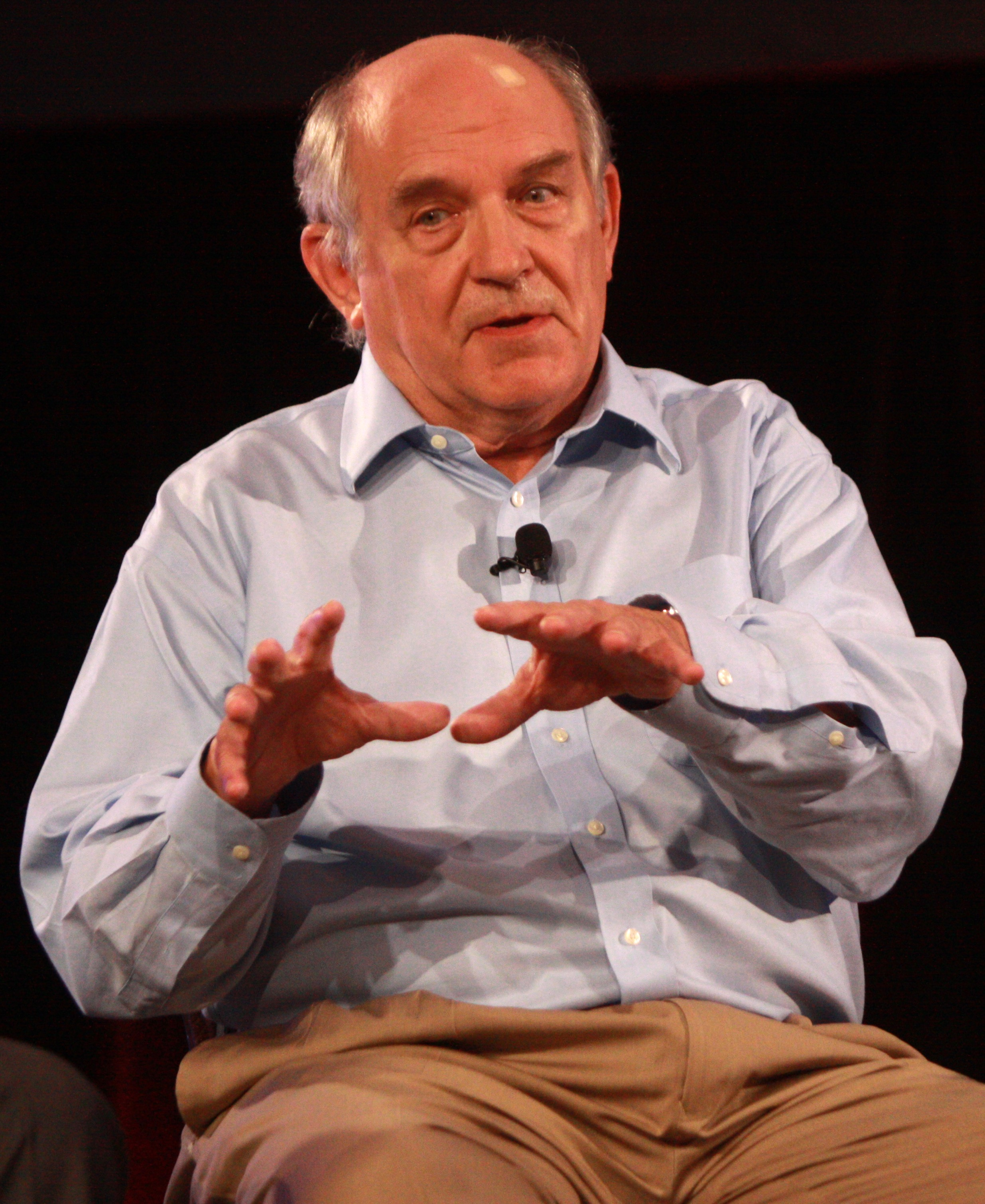
Charles Murray

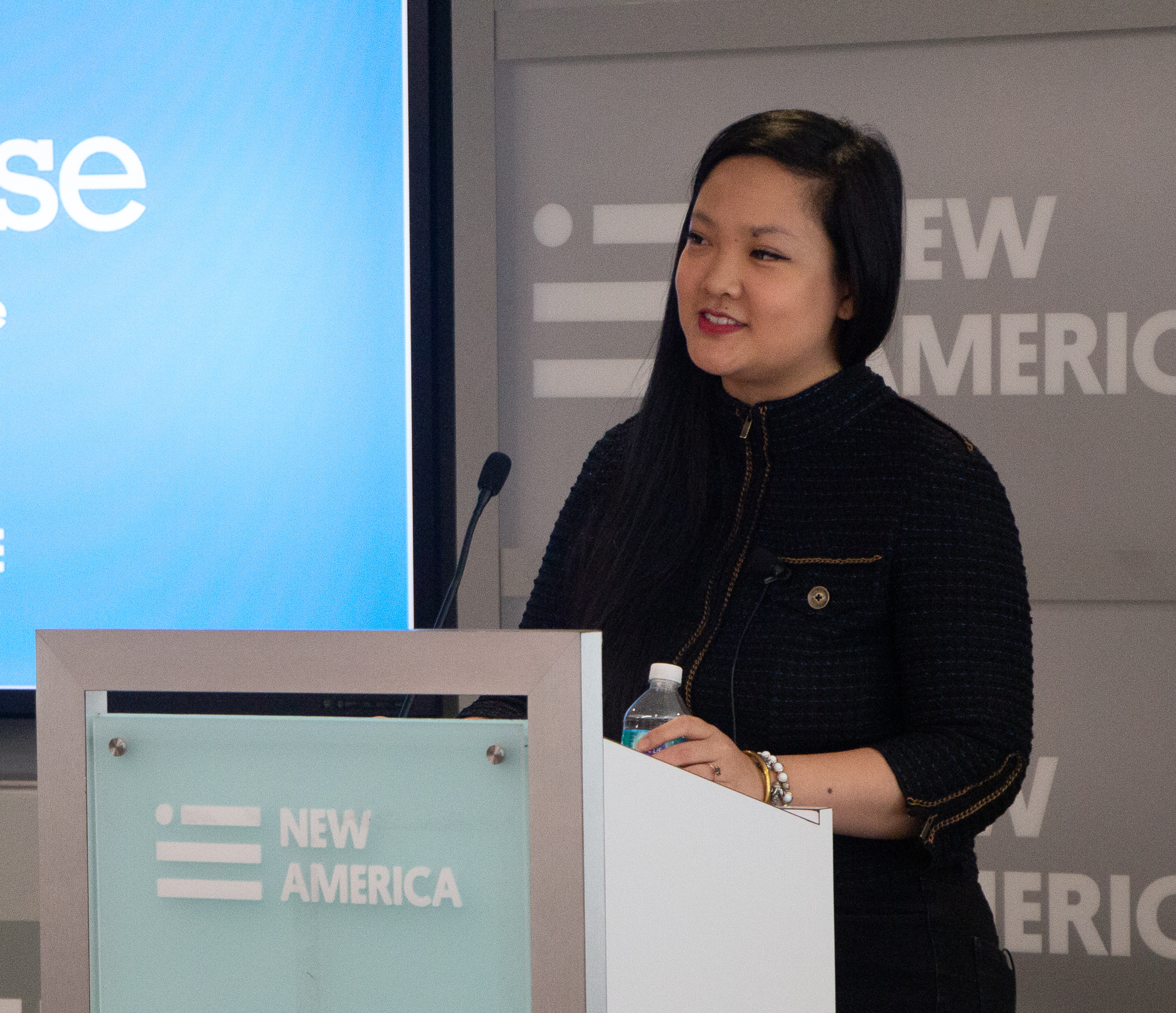
Amanda Nguyen

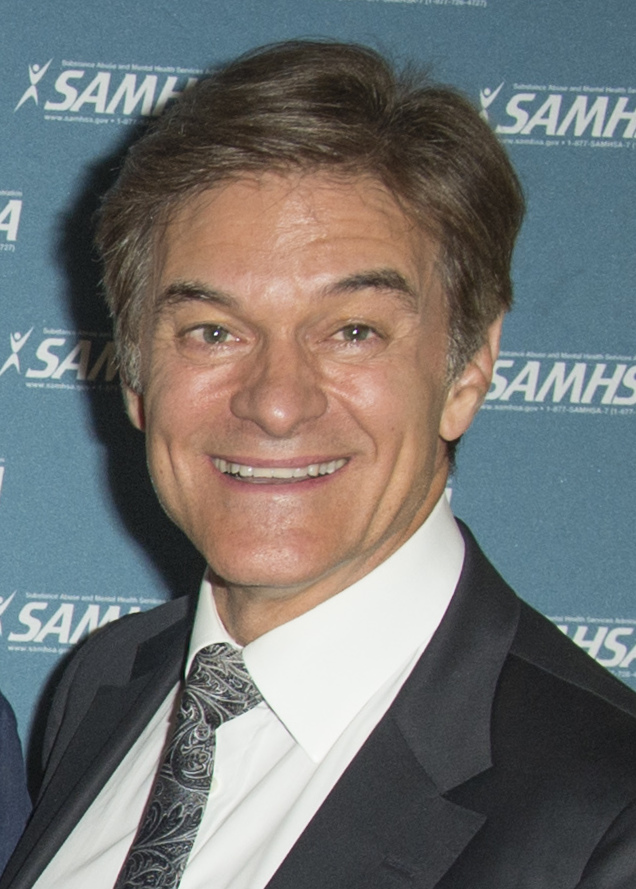
Mehmet Oz

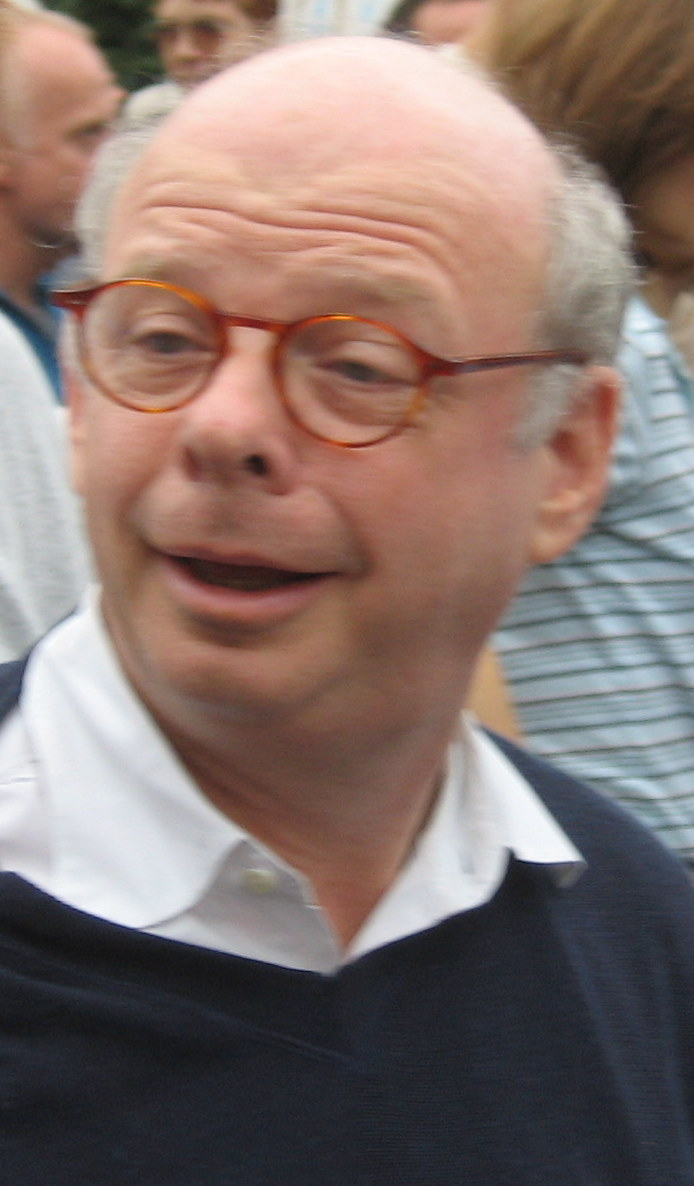
Wallace Shawn

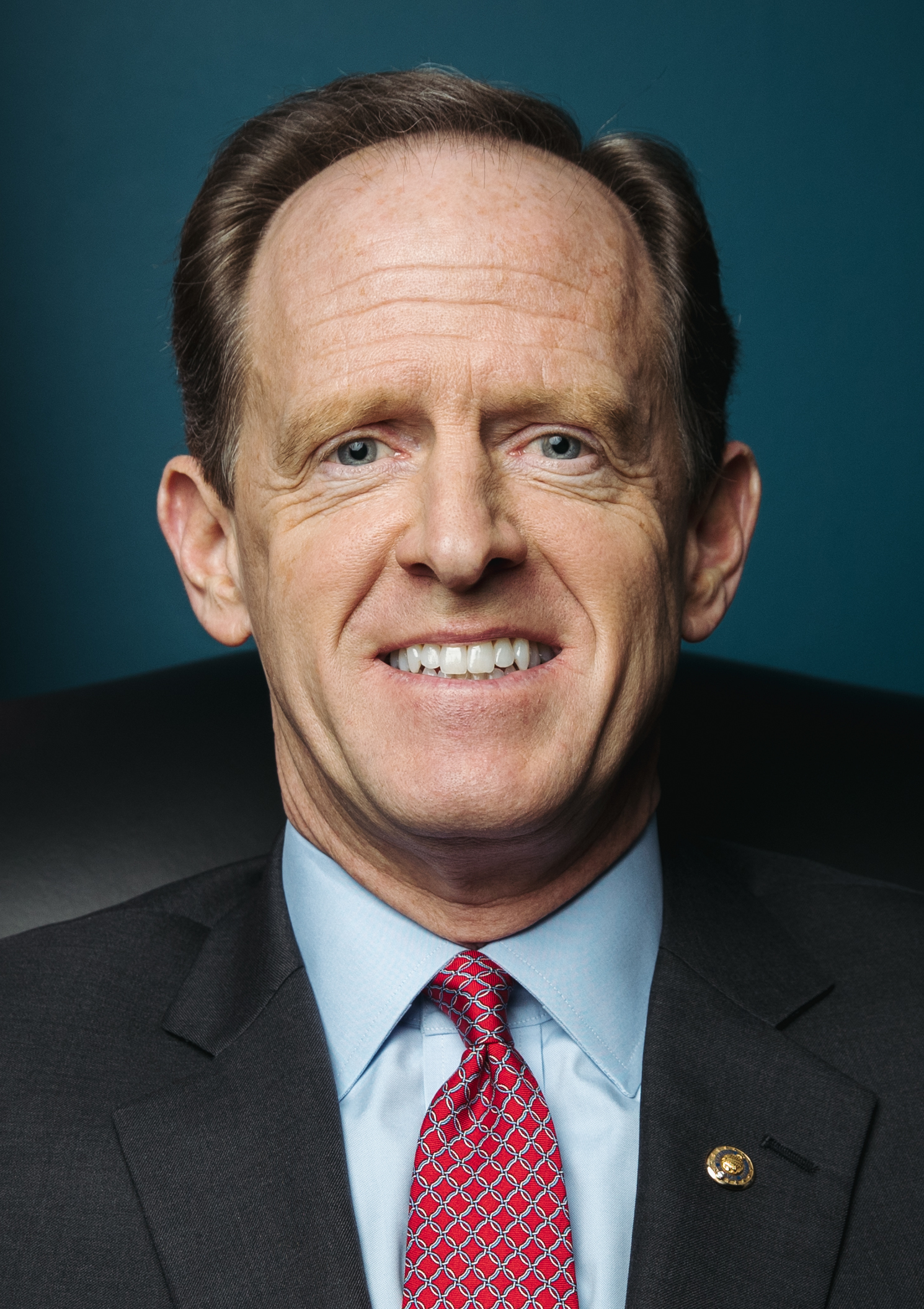
Pat Toomey

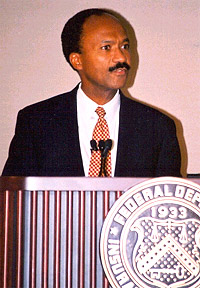
Franklin Raines

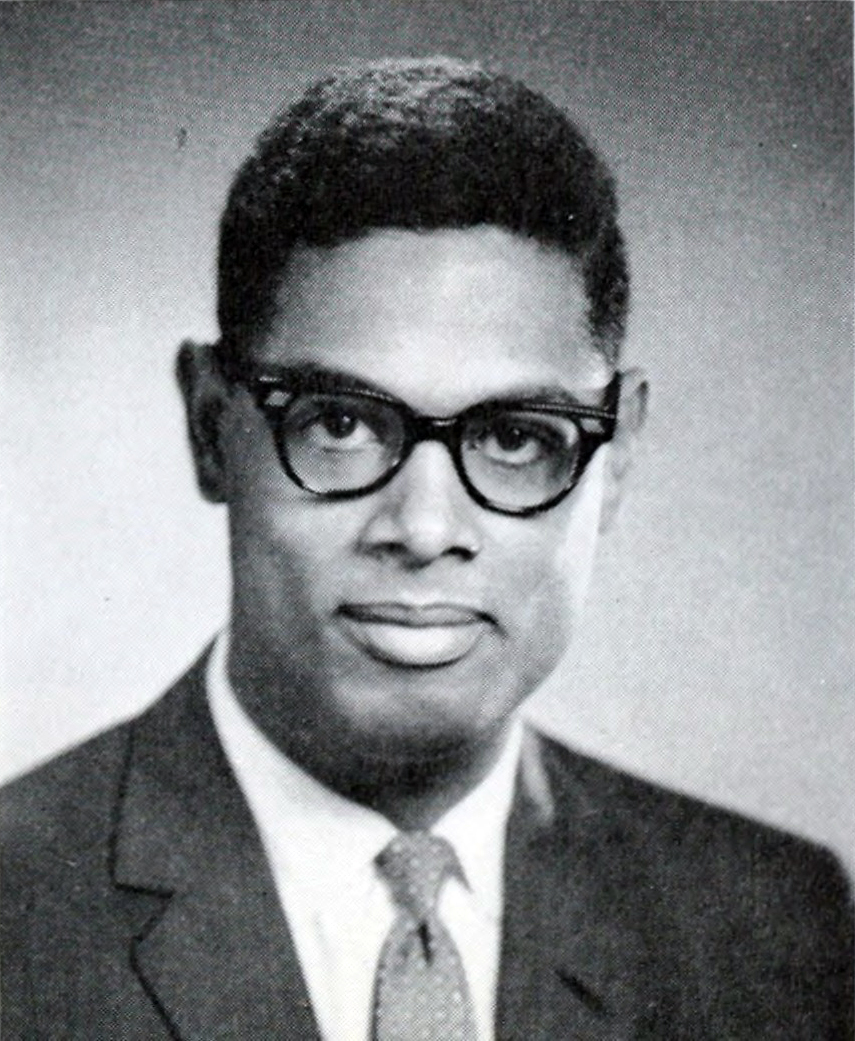
Thomas Sowell

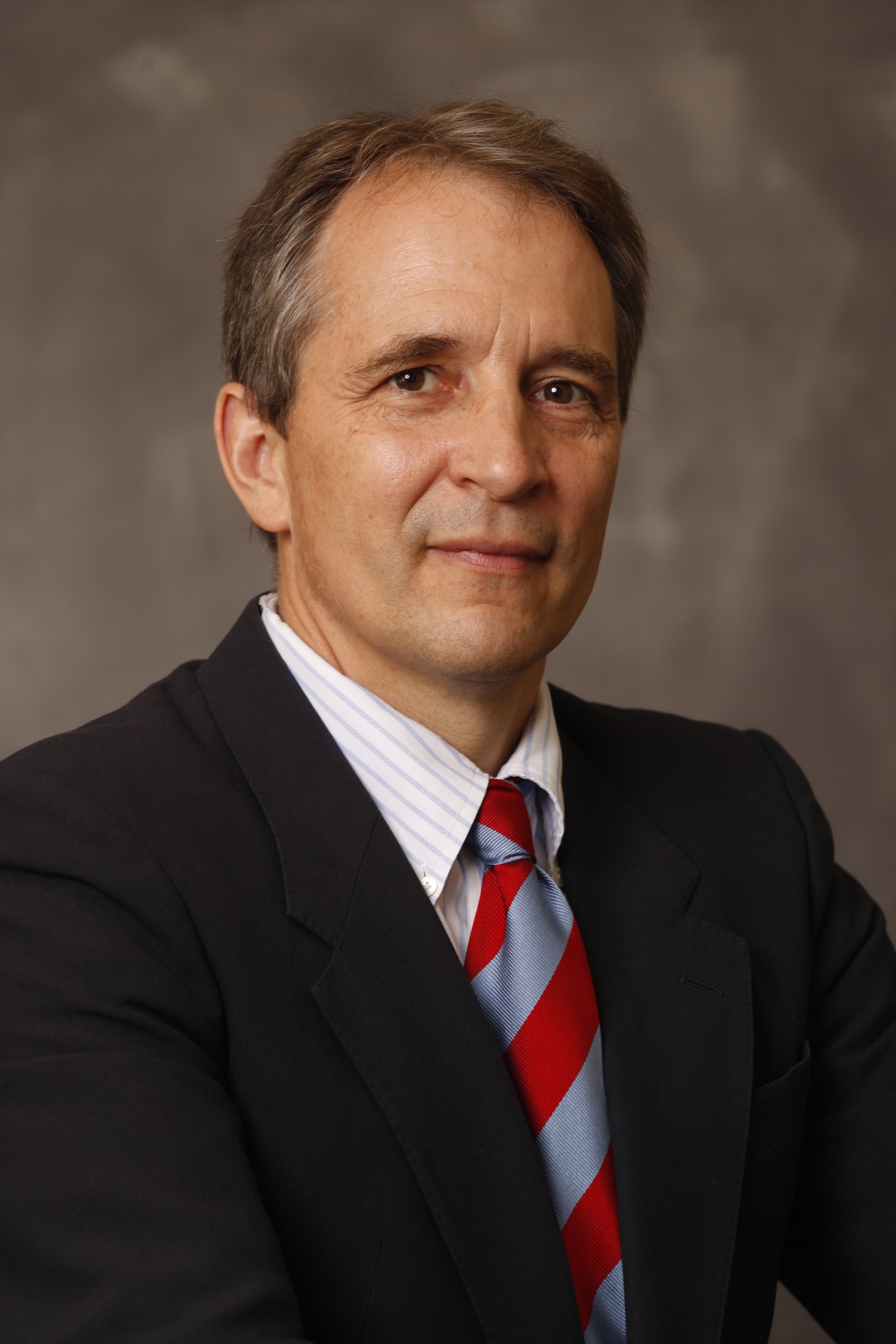
Mortimer Sellers

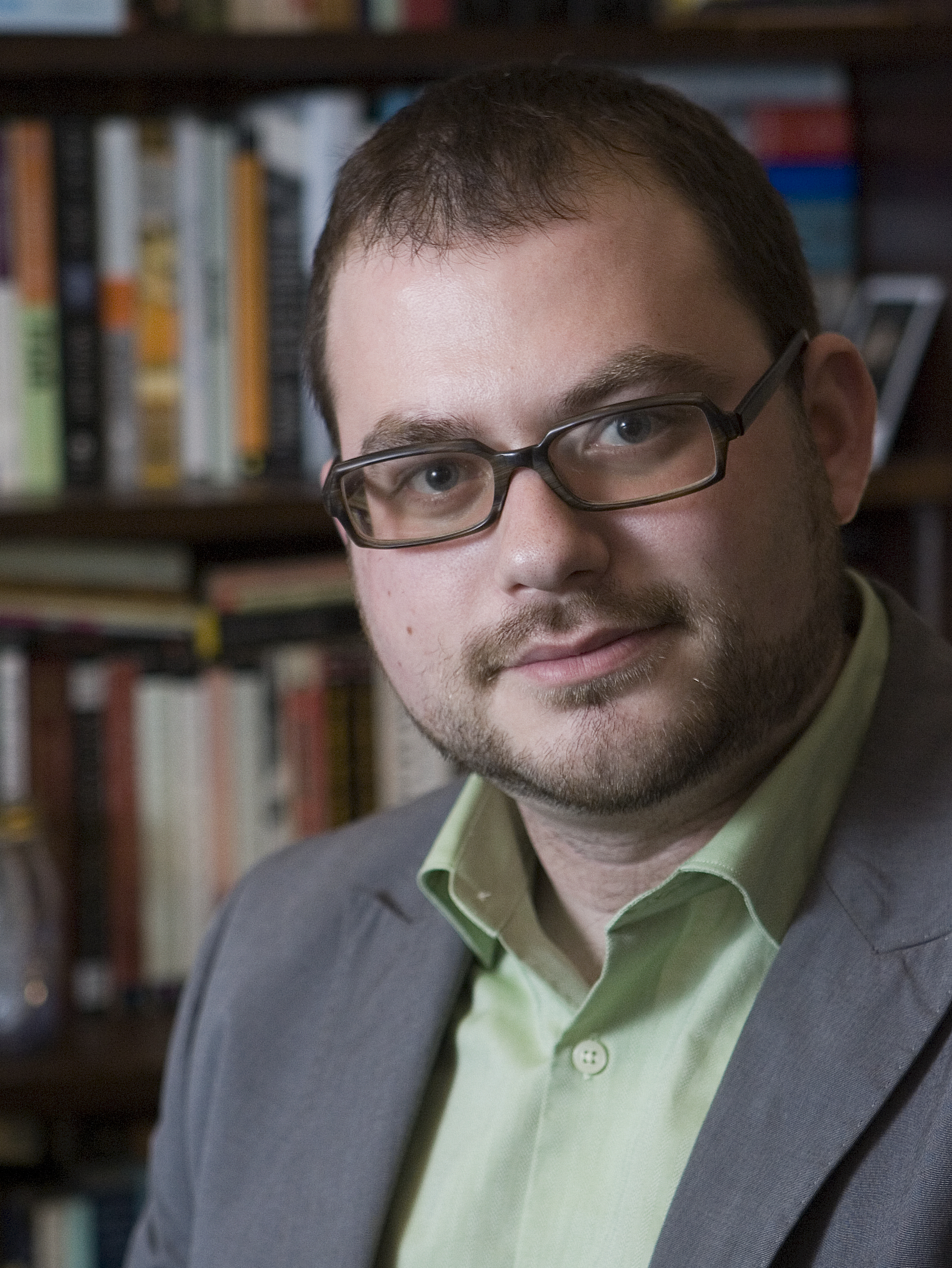
Matthew Yglesias

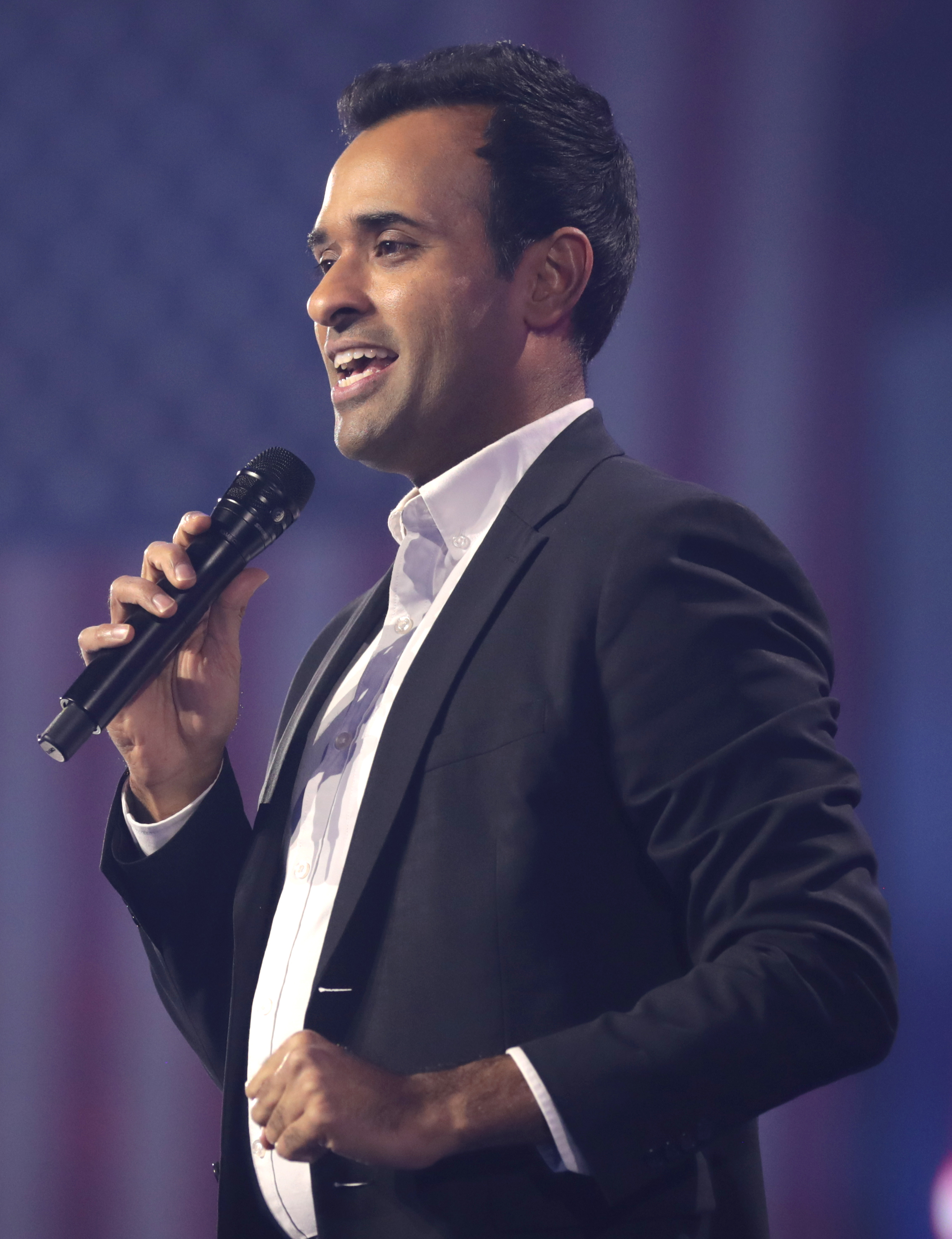
Vivek Ramaswamy

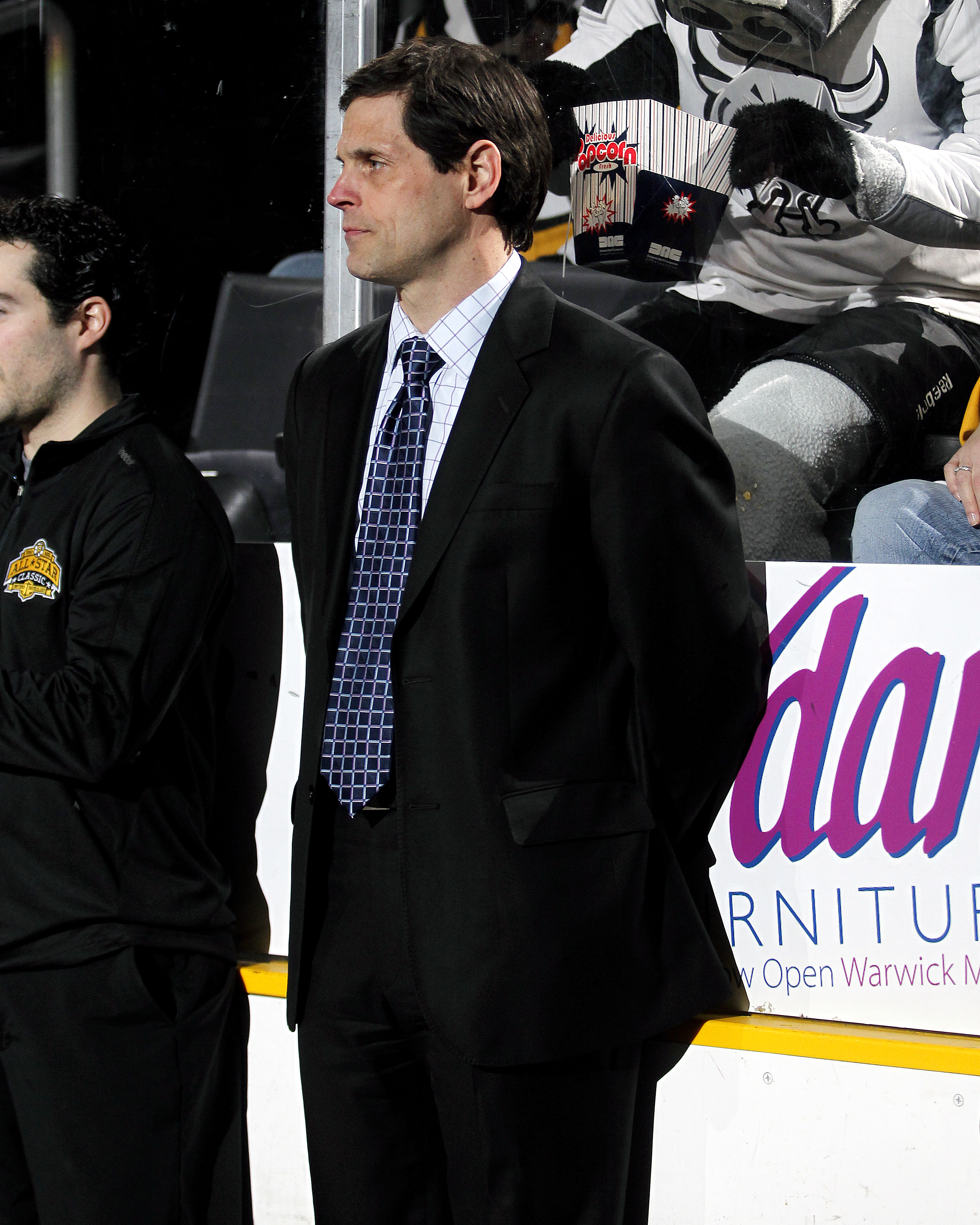
Don Sweeney

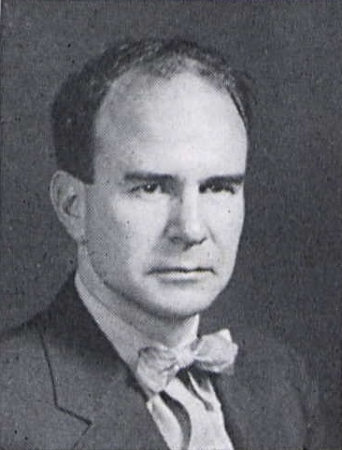
George C. Homans
