= Shivram Dattatray Joshi =

Indian Sanskrit scholar and grammarian

Shivram Dattatray Joshi (1926–2013) also known as S. D. Joshi, was an Indian Sanskrit scholar and grammarian based in Pune, Maharashtra.

== Life ==
=== Personal life ===
Joshi was born in a family of Sanskrit scholars in Ratnagiri in Konkan, Maharashtra. His father died when Joshi was a child. He married Kalavati Bhagavat, his college classmate, in 1958. Joshi had two children, a son named Anandavardhan (Nandan) and a daughter named Suvrata. Joshi died on 29 July 2013 at the age of 87.

=== Education and career ===
Joshi's initial learning was from his uncle Maheshwar Shastri Joshi in Pune. He mastered Sanskrit grammar before the age of twenty, passing various examinations from Bengal, Baroda and Pune. He began teaching at the Poona Sanskrit College and served as its principal from 1947 to 1955.

Joshi was the teacher to Daniel Ingalls in 1950s. Ingalls was very impressed with Joshi and persuaded him to come to Harvard University. As Joshi had learned Sanskrit only in the traditional system, he had to first complete a Bachelor of Arts degree in 1955, after which he applied for a fellowship at Harvard University. Joshi completed his PhD from Harvard University in 1960 in the field of Sanskrit lexical semantics, with Ingalls as his advisor.

Joshi returned to India in 1960 and joined the Department of Sanskrit Dictionary at the Deccan College, Pune. In 1964, he joined the Centre of Advanced Study in Sanskrit at the University of Poona as a Reader. In 1970, he was appointed the Head of Department of Sanskrit and Prakrit at the university. From 1974 to 1987 he was the Director of Centre of Advanced Study in Sanskrit. From 1987, he led the Deccan College Sanskrit Dictionary Project. Joshi was a visiting professor at Harvard University from 1971 to 1972, and at Nagoya University from 1976 to 1977.

== Major works ==
- Commentary on Patanjali’s Mahābhāṣya planned in 11 volumes, with J.A.F. Roodbergen, but which was abandoned after 2 volumes.
- Commentary on Pāṇini’s grammar in 15 volumes, with J.A.F. Roodbergen.

== Awards and recognition ==
Joshi was awarded the title of National Scholar (Rashtriya Pandit) by the President of India in 1991.

Joshi is credited with attracting the attention of theoretical linguists to the Aṣṭādhyāyī. He is sometimes referred to as the new Pāṇini.
