= Wales Professor of Sanskrit =

The position of Wales Professorship of Sanskrit in Harvard University is the first endowed chair for Sanskrit studies established in the United States.

Henry Ware Wales (1818–1856; Harvard, 1838) by a will dated April 24, 1849, provided for the endowment of the Professorship. The chair was established on January 26, 1903 with Charles Rockwell Lanman elected as the inaugural holder of the chair on March 23, 1903. Michael Witzel was appointed in 1987 and is the fourth and current Wales professor.

== Foundation ==
The inaugural Wales Professor of Sanskrit Charles Rockwell Lanman started his career in Johns Hopkins University in 1876 where a department of Sanskrit was established under him. In 1880 Lanman accepted professorship at Harvard under request by the then Harvard President Charles William Eliot.

== List of professors ==
- Charles Rockwell Lanman (1880–1926)
- Walter Eugene Clark (1927–1950)
- Daniel H. H. Ingalls, Sr. (1958–1983)
- Michael Witzel (1987–present)
