= Daniel H. H. Ingalls Sr. =

American Professor of Sanskrit (1916–1999)

- Born: Daniel Henry Holmes Ingalls; May 4, 1916
- Died: July 17, 1999 (aged 83)

Academic background
- Education: Harvard University

Academic work
- Doctoral students: Sheldon Pollock, Wendy Doniger

Daniel Henry Holmes Ingalls Sr. (May 4, 1916 – July 17, 1999) was the Wales Professor of Sanskrit at Harvard University.

== Early life and education ==
Ingalls was born in New York City and raised in Virginia. He received his A.B. in 1936 at Harvard University, as a major in Greek and Latin. He also earned his A.M. in 1938 studying symbolic logic under Willard Van Orman Quine

He was appointed a junior fellow in the Harvard Society of Fellows in 1939 after which he set off for Calcutta for the study of Navya-Nyāya (Note: Ingalls’s "Materials for the Study of Navya-Nyāya Logic", published as volume 40 of the Harvard Oriental Series in 1951 was the first bibliography of Navya-Nyāya logic in any European language) logic with Kalipada Tarkacharya (1938–41).

His fellowship was interrupted by the Second World War during which he served as an Army code breaker decoding Japanese radio messages for the Office of Strategic Services (1942–44).

After the war, Ingalls returned to Harvard as Wales Professor of Sanskrit. He was particularly known for his translation and commentary in An Anthology of Sanskrit Court Poetry, which contains some 1,700 Sanskrit verses collected by a Buddhist abbot, Vidyākara, in Bengal around AD 1050. Ingalls was a student of the Indian grammarian Shivram Dattatray Joshi, and the teacher of many famous students of Sanskrit, such as Wendy Doniger, Diana Eck, Jeffrey Moussaieff Masson, Bimal Krishna Matilal, Robert Thurman, Sheldon Pollock, Karl Harrington Potter, Phyllis Granoff, Indira Viswanathan Peterson, David Pingree, and Gary Tubb. He was renowned for the rigor of his introductory Sanskrit course. He was the editor of the Harvard Oriental Series from 1950 to 1983. He was an elected member of the American Philosophical Society.

Ingalls was the father of the computer scientist Dan Ingalls and the author Rachel Ingalls.

He was also chairman of the department of Sanskrit and Indian studies and president of the American Oriental Society.

== An Anthology of Sanskrit Court Poetry ==
Volume 44 of the Harvard Oriental Series, 'An Anthology of Sanskrit Court Poetry', is the acclaimed English translation by Ingalls of the Sanskrit text 'Subhasitaratnakosa' of Vidyakara. The book has a lengthy introduction by Ingalls containing an incisive analysis of the structure of the Sanskrit language, and also of Ingalls's perspective on Sanskrit literature in general, and Sanskrit poetry in particular. It also has a section titled 'On the Passing of Judgements' in which Ingalls criticizes some critics of Sanskrit poetry.

== Criticism of nineteenth and twentieth century western Sanskritists ==
Ingalls writes that after the initial excitement at the discovery of Sanskrit literature, which produced the enthusiastic and positive reviews of British Sanskritists like Hastings and Sir William Jones, there was a long period in which English writers subjected Sanskrit literature to the literary canons of their own land. By doing this their judgements were sometimes "monstrous" according to Ingalls. The Sanskritist Fitzedward Hall, writes Ingalls, being troubled by the sometimes erotic imagery in the poetry of the Sanskrit poet Subandhu, exclaimed that Subandhu "was no better, at the very best, than a specious savage" and A. A. Macdonell according to Ingalls found nothing to say of the great Sanskrit poets Bharavi and Magha except that they favored 'verbal tricks and metrical puzzles". The judgement of these scholars, explains Ingalls, was clouded with bias in as much as it was based on nineteenth century western morals and nineteenth century western notions of literature. "At no point was it enlightened by reference to the critical literature of Sanskrit itself", writes Ingalls. Ingalls then goes on to criticize the British scholar Arthur Berriedale Keith of whom Ingalls writes that although Keith was a great scholar of Vedic studies and modern Indian law, 'it is obvious from his works that for the most part he disliked Sanskrit literature' and that 'of Keith's reading, it seems to me, no word ever passed beyond his head to the heart'. Ingalls notes that when criticizing Sanskrit poets, Keith never applies the remarks of any Sanskrit critic to the work he is judging.

== Notes and references ==
Notes
