= Phyllis Granoff =

American Indologist

- Born: 1947 (age 78–79)
- Occupation: Professor
- Known for: Indologist

Phyllis Emily Granoff (born 1947) is a specialist in Indic religions. In July 2004, she joined Yale University as a Professor of World Religions. She also serves as the editor of the Journal of Indian Philosophy.

== Education ==
After receiving a Bachelor of Arts (summa cum laude) in Far Eastern Languages from Radcliffe College, she earned her Ph.D. in Sanskrit, Indian Studies and Fine Arts from the Harvard University. She is fluent in numerous Indian languages, including Sanskrit, Prakrit, Pāli, Ardha Magadhi, Bengali, Hindi, Assamese, Gujarati and Oriya. In addition, she has some degree of skill in Japanese, Chinese, French and German.

== Career ==
Granoff has taught at numerous institutions, including the Austrian-American Institute, McMaster University, University of California at Berkeley, Harvard University, Sorbonne, École des Hautes Études en Sciences Sociales, and Yale University. Professor Granoff's work has focused on Indian mythology, cults, image worship, art, literature, poetry, and medieval Indian law codes. With her husband, Professor Koichi Shinohara, she has written, translated and edited several books, and has published more than 70 journal articles on various topics.

Over the years, Granoff has inspired and worked closely with scholars who have revolutionized the study of Indic religions, including Gregory Schopen.

== Anthologies ==
Pilgrims, Patrons and Place: Localizing Sanctity in Asian Religions (2003) is a book which brings together essays by anthropologists, scholars of religion, and art historians on the subject of sacred place and sacred biography in Asia. The chapters span a broad geographical area that includes India, Nepal, Thailand, Indonesia, and China, and explore issues from the classical and medieval period to the present. They show how sacred places have a plurality of meanings for all religious communities and how in their construction, secular politics, private religious experience, and sectarian rivalry can all intersect. The contributors explore some of the most fundamental challenges that religious groups face as they expand from their homeland or confront the demands of modernity. In every case the biography of a saint or founding figure proves to be central to the formation of religious identity. Sacred place becomes a means of concretizing the ever-expanding sphere of the saint's influence. ^{[3]}

Images in Asian Religions (2004) is a work which work offers a challenge to any simple understanding of the role of images by looking at aspects of the reception of image worship that have only begun to be studied, including the many hesitations that Asian religious traditions expressed about image worship. Written by eminent scholars of anthropology, art history, and religion with interests in different regions (India, China, Japan, and Southeast Asia), this volume takes a fresh look at the many ways in which images were defined and received in Asian religions. Areas addressed include the complex, fluid, and contested nature of the religious image; the reception of images within the intellectual culture of Hinduism and Buddhism; and the importance of historical and cultural context in the study of religious images. ^{[4]}

== Translations ==
The Forest of Thieves and the Magic Garden: An Anthology of Medieval Jain Stories (Penguin, 1998) is a translation of numerous medieval Jain stories drawn from texts dating from the seventh to the fifteenth centuries CE, focusing on the Indic concept of renunciation. The stories translated in this book have been very carefully selected to explore numerous themes central to Jainism and medieval Indian culture. The original language for these stories is sometimes Sanskrit and on other occasions Prakrit. ^{[5]}

The Journey: Stories by Kishor Charan Das (University of Michigan Press, 2000) is a collection of urban stories whose characters are mainly middle class. Kishor Charan Das is one of the more distinguished writers of the Oriyā language. His stories are often about differences between realities and imagination. These are stories about human weaknesses, the fallibility of human relationships, and the strategies we adopt to cope with our failures. They are about coming to terms with unpleasant, sometimes shocking truths about ourselves and others. ^{[6]}

== Academic recognition ==
Granoff first received academic recognition for her 1978 book titled "Philosophy and Argument in Late Vedānta: Śrī Harshā's Khaṇḍanakhaṇḍakhādya." This book deals with the work of Śrī Harshā, a twelfth-century Indian philosopher, who is regarded as "one of the most important intellectual figures to rise within the mature Sanskrit tradition." ^{[7]} The Journal of the American Oriental Society reviewer of this work declared it to be "the first conceptually and textually responsible work dealing with Śrī Harshā." ^{[7]} In this work, Granoff is praised for providing a different perspective from that of "the Western and neo-Hindu readings of Vedānta," by showing it to be an "existentially earnest, logically sophisticated philosophical position." ^{[7]}

Granoff and Shinohara also received praise for their 1992 work titled "Speaking of Monks: Religious Biography in India and China." The reviewer of this book described Granoff and Shinohara to be "experienced masters of the textual sources of the hagiographical traditions with which they deal" and credited them for their "ability to show the relevance of seemingly insignificant details" and their "obvious linguistic familiarity with a variety of literary genres." ^{[8]}

A reviewer described Granoff's 2005 translation of Bengali literary giant Bibhutibhushan Bandyopadhyay to be "one of the most satisfying works of vernacular Indian fiction to appear in English translation in years" and commended Granoff on her "masterful translation." ^{[9]}

== Sources ==
- Dan, A. "A Review of Bones, Stones and Buddhist Monks." http://ccbs.ntu.edu.tw/FULLTEXT/JR-PHIL/ew99061.htm
- Schopen, G. "Bones, Stones and Buddhist Monks." Hawaii: University of Hawaii Press, 2000 (pp. xii)https://books.google.com/books?id=rxdZ-BVNm_IC&pg=PR12&lpg=PR12&dq=gregory+schopen+phyllis+granoff&source=web&ots=TnVzk25HF_&sig=Lk2Y3zefAZvVtuv72-4oLmfghSQ#PPR8,M1
- University of British Columbia Press https://web.archive.org/web/20070223051854/http://www.ubcpress.ca/search/title_book.asp?BookID=3013
- University of British Columbia Press https://web.archive.org/web/20070223051903/http://www.ubcpress.ca/search/title_book.asp?BookID=3198
- Product Details & Reviews, Amazon.com https://www.amazon.co.uk/dp/0140437223
- Center for South and Southeast Asian Studies, University of Michigan Press http://www.press.umich.edu/titleDetailDesc.do?id=19321
- Alper, H. "Journal of the American Oriental Society" 103:3 (1983)
- Strong, J.S. "Journal of Asian Studies" (1994)
- Choudhury, C. "The World of Bibhutibhushan Bandyopadhyay." The Middle Stage (18-Sept-05) https://middlestage.blogspot.com/2005/09/world-of-bibhutibhushan-bandyopadhyay.html
