= Charles Rockwell Lanman =

American linguist (1850–1941)

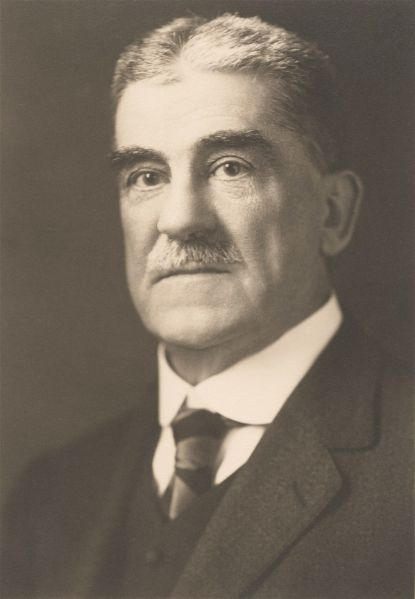
- Born: July 8, 1850; Norwich, Connecticut, U.S.
- Died: February 20, 1941 (aged 90); Cambridge, Massachusetts, U.S.
- Education: Yale University
- Known for: Sanskrit scholar and editor of the Harvard Oriental Series
- Scientific career
- Fields: Sanskrit Language and Literature
- Workplaces: Harvard University, Johns Hopkins University

Charles Rockwell Lanman (July 8, 1850 – February 20, 1941) was an American scholar of the Sanskrit language.

== Early life and education ==
Charles Rockwell Lanman was born in Norwich, Connecticut, the eighth of the nine children of Peter Lanman III and Catherine (Cook) Lanman, on July 8, 1850. His mother died when he was three years old, and his aunt Abigail (Abby) Trumbull Lanman helped raise him. His Aunt Abby was an artist, and as one of two legatees of the estate of her great-uncle American Revolutionary War artist John Trumbull, inherited many of Trumbull's Revolutionary War period paintings and sketches. At age ten, a young Charles Lanman read a copy of the Journal of the American Oriental Society containing a translation of a textbook of Hindu astronomy, which sparked his interest in Sanskrit.

Lanman graduated from Yale College (Phi Beta Kappa) in 1871, and was a graduate student there (1871–1873) studying Greek under James Hadley and Sanskrit under WD Whitney. He then eventually earned his doctorate degree at Yale in 1873. He also studied Sanskrit under Weber and Roth and philology under Georg Curtius and August Leskien in Germany (1873–1876).

He married Mary Billings Hinckley on July 18, 1888, at Beach Bluff, Massachusetts. She descended from Thomas Hinckley, the last governor of Plymouth Colony. Professor Lanman spent his sabbatical year with his new wife in India on a one-year honeymoon. As he travelled across India in 1889 he bought for Harvard University some 500 Sanskrit and Prakrit books and manuscripts, which, with those subsequently bequeathed to the university by Fitzedward Hall, make the most valuable collection of its kind in America, and made possible the Harvard Oriental Series, edited by Lanman.

Upon their return from India in 1890, the Lanmans built a home at 9 Farrar Street in Cambridge where he lived until his death. Charles and Mary Lanman had six children.

== Academic career ==
Lanman was appointed a professor at Johns Hopkins University when it opened in 1876. He was a professor of Sanskrit at Hopkins from 1876 to 1880. In 1880, Lanman moved to Harvard University where he was the first to preside over the department of Indo-Iranian Languages, which became the department of Indic Philology in 1902, and ultimately became the department of Sanskrit and Indian Studies in 1951. He was also the inaugural holder of the title of Wales Professor of Sanskrit.

During 1911 and 1912 one of his students at the Harvard Graduate School was T. S. Eliot, who was undertaking a doctorate in philosophy.

From 1879 to 1884, he was secretary and editor of the Transactions, and in 1890—1891, president of the American Philological Association, and in 1884-1894 he was corresponding secretary of the American Oriental Society, from 1897 to 1907 vice-president, and in 1907-1908 president. He was elected a member of the American Academy of Arts and Sciences in 1881 and to the American Philosophical Society in 1906.

He was also Honorary Fellow of the Asiatic Society of Bengal, of France, of England, and of Germany and Corresponding Member of the Society of Sciences at Göttingen, the Russian Academy of Sciences, and the Académie des Inscriptions et Belles-Lettres of the Institute of France. Lanman was a Fellow in the American Academy of Arts and Sciences.

Professor Lanman received an LL.D. from Yale in 1902 and an LL.D. from the University of Aberdeen in 1906, the latter university's 400th anniversary.

== Literary works ==
In the Harvard Oriental Series Lanman translated (vol. iv.) into English Rajacekhara's Karpura-Manjari (1900), a Prakrit drama, and (vols. vii and viii) revised and edited Whitney's translation of, and notes on, the Atharva-Veda Samhitā (2 vols, 1905); he published A Sanskrit Reader, with Vocabulary and Notes, which is still a standard introductory text today.

== Retirement ==
He retired from Harvard in 1926 and became professor emeritus. Most of the foremost Sanskrit scholars in the United States at the time were once his pupils or collaborators, or both. A vigorous man, Lanman rowed daily on the Charles River until age 88, ice permitting, and was nicknamed "Charles River Lanman" by the Harvard Crimson. It was his proudest boast that he had rowed 12,000 miles on the river which shared his name.

Charles Rockwell Lanman died on February 20, 1941, at age 90.

Academic offices
Preceded by Thomas Day Seymour	President of the American Philological Association; 1890—1891	Succeeded by Julius Sachs
