= Johannes Hertel =

German Indologist (1872–1955)

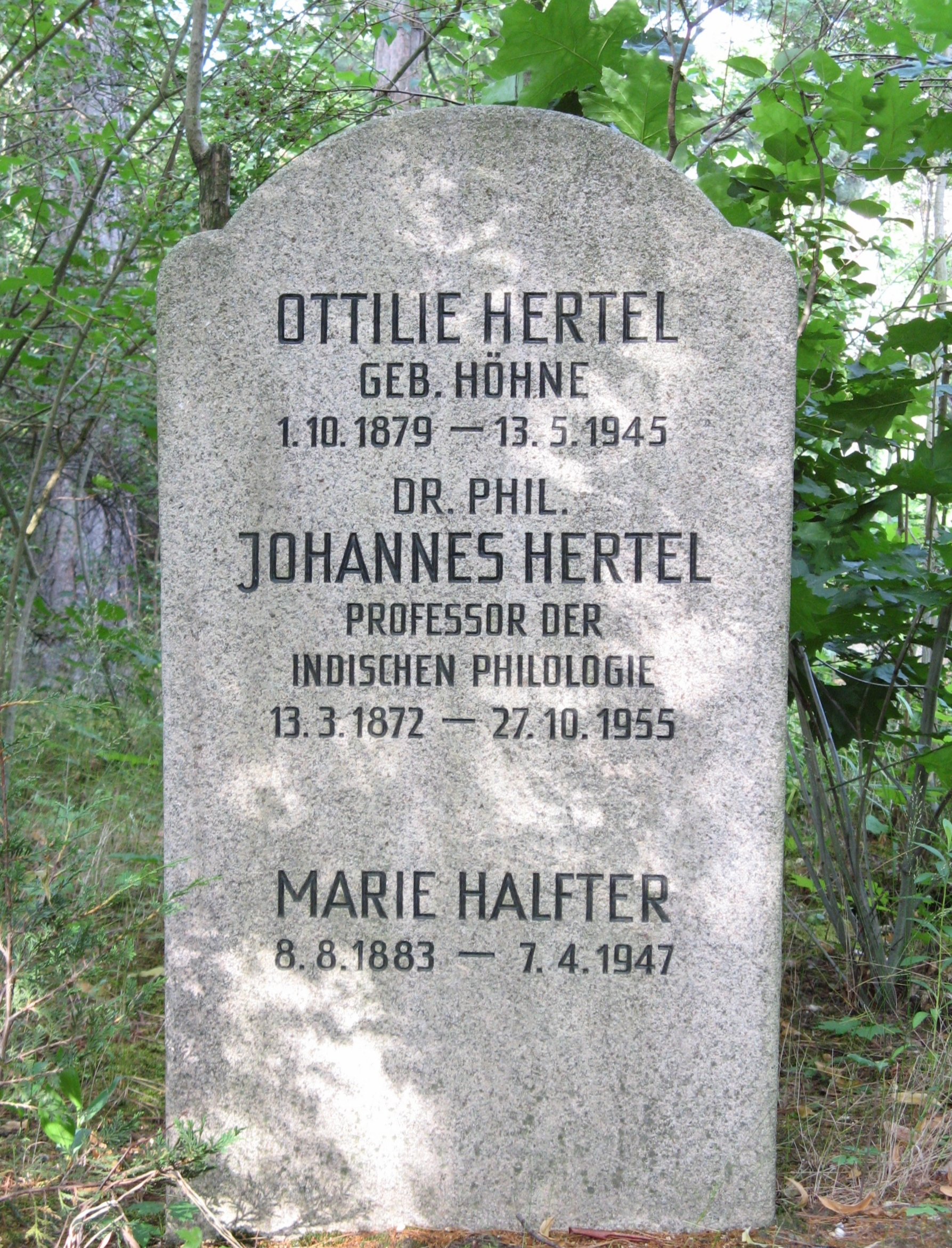
Hertel's grave in the Leipzig Südfriedhof

Johannes Hertel (13 March 1872, Zwickau – 27 October 1955, Leipzig) was a German Indologist.

Hertel wrote numerous essays and books on Indological topics. His research focus was Indian narrative literature and the Vedas. Above all, he is known for his scientific work on the textual history of the Panchatantra.

Hertel obtained his Ph.D. from the University of Leipzig in 1897 with a thesis on the Hitopadesha. From 1919 to 1937 he was full professor and Chair of Indian Studies at the University of Leipzig, where he taught Asian and Indo-European languages such as Sanskrit, Vedic, and Avestan, and he translated numerous works from these into German. Most of his works on Vedic and Avestan subjects appeared in the series Indo-Iranische Quellen und Forschungen ("Indo-Iranian Sources and Research"), which he also edited.

In November 1933 Hertel signed the Vow of allegiance of the Professors of the German Universities and High-Schools to Adolf Hitler and the National Socialistic State.

Hertel was a member of the Saxonian Academy of Sciences and the Royal Asiatic Society in London.

Hertel's extensive correspondence is located in the University Archives of Leipzig and in the manuscript department of the Leipzig University Library.

== Publications ==
- Hertel, Johannes (1906), Das Südliche Pañcatantra [The Southern Panchatantra], Leipzig: B. G. Teubner
- Hertel, Johannes (1908), The Panchatantra: A Collection of Ancient Hindu Tales in the Recension Called Panchakhyanaka, and Dated 1199 AD, of the Jaina Monk, Purnabhadra, Harvard Oriental Series, vol. 11, Cambridge, MA: Harvard University
- Hertel, Johannes (1912), The Panchatantra-text of Purnabhadra: Critical Introduction and List of Variants, Harvard Oriental Series, vol. 12, Cambridge, MA: Harvard University
- Hertel, Johannes (1912), The Panchatantra-text of Purnabhadra and its Relation to Texts of Allied Recensions as shown in Parallel Specimens, Harvard Oriental Series, vol. 13, Cambridge, MA: Harvard University
- Hertel, Johannes (1915), The Panchatantra: A Collection of Ancient Hindu Tales in its Oldest Recension, the Kashmirian, Entitled Tantrakhyayika, Harvard Oriental Series, vol. 14, Cambridge, MA: Harvard University, hdl:2027/pst.000002343747
