= List of ISKCON members and patrons =

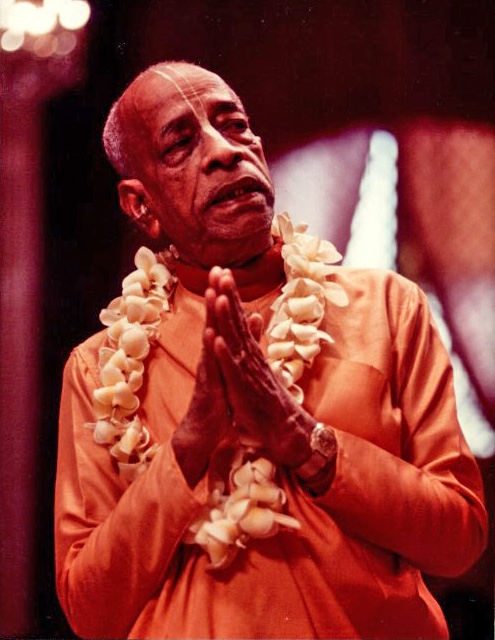
Founder of ISKCON: A. C. Bhaktivedanta Swami Prabhupada

The following is a list of members or people closely associated with the International Society for Krishna Consciousness (ISKCON). This list is not exhaustive.

== Founder-Acharya ==
- A. C. Bhaktivedanta Swami Prabhupada – Founded the movement in New York in 1966.

== Member disciples of A. C. Bhaktivedanta Swami Prabhupada ==
Listed by date of first initiation:

- Kirtanananda Swami – (1937–2011) initiated 1966
- Mukunda Goswami* – initiated 1966
- Rupanuga das - initiated 1966
- Gopal Krishna Goswami - initiated 1968
- Satsvarupa Dasa Goswami* – initiated 1966
- Jayananda Dasa – initiated 1967
- Hansadutta Swami – initiated 1967
- Tamal Krishna Goswami (1946–2002) – initiated 1968
- Vishnujana Swami (1948–1976) – initiated 1968
- Jayadvaita Swami* – initiated 1968
- Jayapataka Swami – initiated 1968
- Ramai Swami – initiated 1972
- Giriraja Swami – initiated 1969
- Bhaktisvarupa Damodar Swami (Dr. Thoudam Damodar Singh, PhD 1937–2006) – initiated 1971
- Indradyumna Swami – initiated 1971
- Ranchor Dasa – initiated 1971
- Romapada Swami – initiated 1971
- Sacinandana Swami – initiated 1972
- Srutakirti Dasa – initiated 1972
- Garuda Dasa – initiated 1973
- Bhakti Tirtha Swami (1950–2005) – initiated – 1973
- Radhanath Swami – initiated 1973
- Bhakti Caitanya Swami – initiated 1973
- Ambarisa Dasa (Alfred B. Ford), the great-grandson of Henry Ford – initiated 1975
- Sadaputa Dasa (Dr. Richard L. Thompson, PhD 1947 – 2008) – initiated 1975
- Satyaraja Dasa (Steven J. Rosen) – initiated 1976
- Bhakti Caru Swami (1945 - 2020) – initiated 1976
- Drutakarma Dasa (Michael A. Cremo) – initiated 1976
- Pragosha Dasa – initiated 1984

*Not Accepting Disciples

== Member grand disciples of Prabhupada ==
- Kadamba Kanana Swami
- Radhika Ramana Dasa (Dr. Ravi M. Gupta, PhD)
- Shaunaka Rishi Dasa
- Yadunandana Swami
- Gaur Gopal Das
- Rasaraj Das (Dr. Ravi Gomatam, PhD)

== Members and patrons in popular culture and the media ==
- Allen Ginsberg American Beat Generation poet
- Annie Lennox (now an agnostic), lead singer of popular British pop rock duo Eurythmics
- Boy George, English singer
- Chrissie Hynde, lead singer and guitarist of the British–American rock band The Pretenders.
- Crispian Mills, lead singer and guitarist of the English rock band Kula Shaker
- George Harrison, English guitarist, singer, songwriter, record producer, and film producer, best known as a member of The Beatles.
- Glen Hansard, Irish singer-songwriter.
- Hayley Mills, English actress, daughter of John Mills. Mother of Crispian Mills from Kula Shaker
- Henry Doktorski, American concert accordionist
- John Joseph and Harley Flanagan, from hardcore band Cro-Mags
- Kevin Wu, YouTube personality
- Marc Ellis, New Zealand rugby league and rugby union player
- Poly Styrene and Lora Logic, from British 1970s punk band X-Ray Spex
- Ray Cappo, of Youth of Today and Shelter
- Russell Brand, English comedian, actor, columnist, author and presenter of radio and television
- Vic DiCara, guitarist for Los Angeles bands Inside Out and 108
