= Bhakti Caitanya Swami =

New Zealand Hindu

Bhakti Chaitanya Swami

Personal life
- Born: 14 August 1951 (age 75) Auckland, New Zealand
- Other name: Richard Naismith

Religious life
- Religion: Hinduism
- Initiation: Diksa–1973, Sannyasa–1994

Religious career
- Post: ISKCON Guru, Sannyasi, Member of the Governing Body Commission

Bhakti Chaitanya Swami (IAST: Bhakti Caitanya Svāmī; born 14 August 1951 in Auckland, New Zealand) is a Gaudiya Vaishnava swami and a religious leader of the International Society for Krishna Consciousness (also known as the Hare Krishna movement or ISKCON). He is a member of its Governing Body Commission and is the leader of ISKCON in South Africa, the Baltic states and Russia.

He was born as Richard Naismith on 14 August 1951 in Auckland, New Zealand. In 1972 he first met ISKCON founder A. C. Bhaktivedanta Swami Prabhupada in Auckland University. A year later he joined that society in London and received initiation from Prabhupada, who gave him the sanskrit name of Raghubhir Dasa.

The swami is closely associated with the educational programs of ISKCON and teaches at the Vaisnava Institute for Higher Education in Vrindavana. In 1994, during the Gaura Purnima Festival, he took the renounced order of sannyasa from Giriraja Swami and received the name Bhakti Caitanya Swami. Later he became a member of its Governing Body Commission and ISKCON Guru.

== See also ==
- List of ISKCON members and patrons
