= Tamal Krishna Goswami =

American Hindu theologian (1946–2002)

His Holiness Tamāla Kṛṣṇa Gosvāmī Śrīla Gurudeva
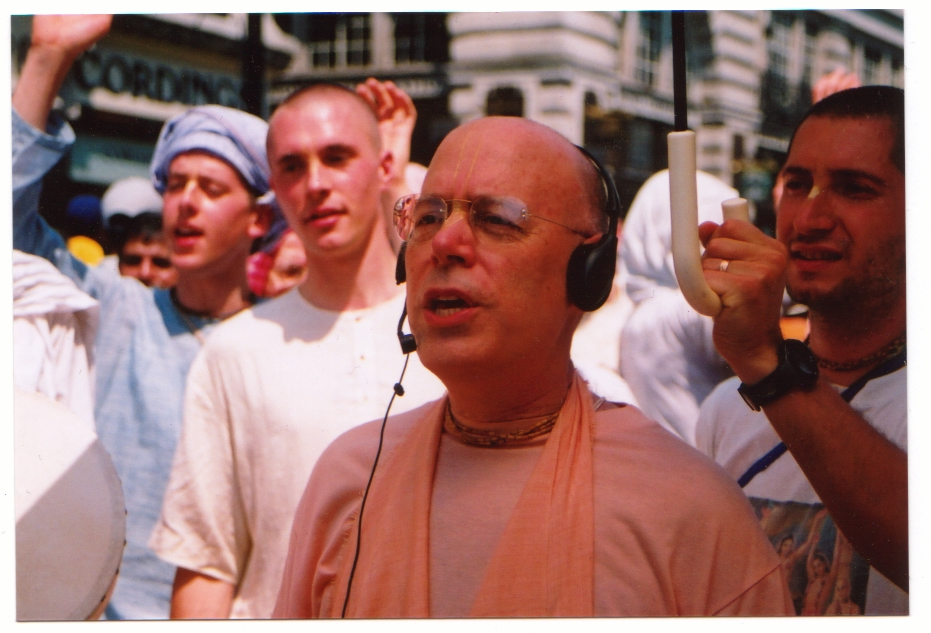
- Title: Guru-Ācārya

Personal life
- Born: Thomas G. Herzig; June 18, 1946 New York City, USA
- Died: March 15, 2002 (aged 55) Phuliya, West Bengal, India
- Website: Website

Religious life
- Religion: Hinduism
- Philosophy: Achintya Bheda Abheda
- Lineage: Brahma-Madhva-Gauḍīya Sampradāya
- Sect: Gauḍīya Vaiṣṇavavāda
- Monastic name: Tamāla Kṛṣṇa Gosvāmī
- Ordination: Gauḍīya Sannyāsa, by Bhaktivedānta Swāmī
- Initiation: Gauḍīya Vaiṣṇava Dikṣa; 1968; USA by Bhaktivedānta Swāmī

Religious career
- Teacher: Bhaktivedānta Swāmī
- Post: ISKCON Sannyasin, ISKCON Guru-Ācārya, ISKCON Governing Body Commissioner
- Period in office: 1972–2002 (GBC), 1977–2002 (Guru)
- Predecessor: Bhaktivedānta Swāmī

Tamal Krishna Goswami (IAST: Tamāla Kṛṣṇa Gosvāmī; June 18, 1946 – March 15, 2002), born Thomas G. Herzig in New York City, New York, United States, served on the International Society for Krishna Consciousness's Governing Body Commission from its inception in 1970. He completed a bachelor's degree in religious studies at Southern Methodist University.

== Biography ==
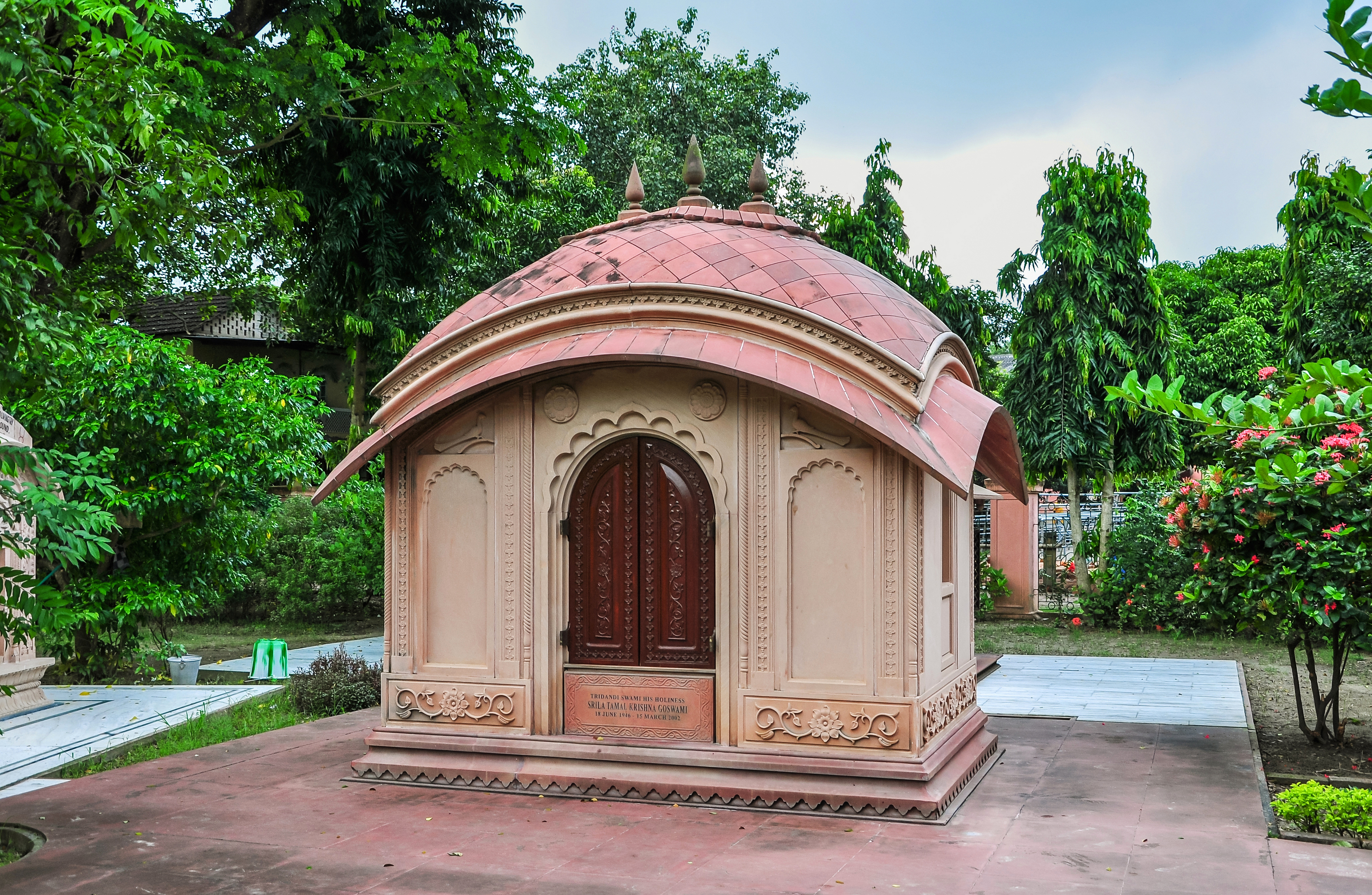
Pushpa Samadhi of Srila Tamal Krishna Goswami in Mayapur

Born in Harlem, New York, he began associating with the Hare Krishna movement in 1968, and was accepted as a disciple by A. C. Bhaktivedanta Swami Prabhupāda soon thereafter. From 1975 until 1979, Tamal Krishna Goswami headed the "Radha-Damodara Party". The party consisted of hundreds of Bhaktivedanta Swami's disciples, who traveled around the USA on buses, distributing Bhaktivedanta Swami's books.

The Governing Body Commission (GBC) is the managerial authority of the International Society for Krishna Consciousness. ISKCON's founder, Bhaktivedanta Swami, created the GBC in 1972 and since that time it has met on an annual basis. Tamal Krishna Goswami was a member of this body from its beginning.

Tamal Krishna Goswami died in a vehicular accident on 15 March 2002 at Phuliya in West Bengal, India. His samadhi (tomb) is placed beside Bhaktivedanta Swami's samadhi in ISKCON Sri Mayapur Dhama, West Bengal, India.

== Literary contributions ==
=== The Mysterious Pastimes of Mohini-murti ===
The Mysterious Pastimes of Mohini-murti is a 20th-century Hindu commentary by Tamal Krishna Goswami on the Goddess Mohini.

This commentary on the Hindu Goddess Mohini was produced by Tamal Krishna Goswami in the fall of 1993. Mohini-lila plays an important role on the periphery of Vaishnavism. There are two popular lilas of Mohini which can be found in Canto Eight (chapters 9 and 12) of the Bhagavata Purana. Mohini also plays a prominent role in the popular Hindu story known as "the churning of the ocean of milk", and her role in this story is mentioned in numerous Hindu texts, such as the two epics, most of the Puranas, and numerous vernacular literature. The Mysterious Pastimes of Mohini-murti is covered in two chapters of Bhaktivedanta Swami's translation and commentary on the Eight Canto of the Bhagavata Purana, Chapter 9, The Lord Incarnates as Mohini-murti and Chapter 12, The Mohini-murti Incarnation Bewilders Lord Shiva.

In this commentary, Bhaktivedanta Swami's discussions of Mohini-lila especially as they relate to gender roles in verse 8.9.9 are analyzed and considered. This includes the notable passage from Bhaktivedanta Swami's commentary.

This commentary was released as a vinyl album in 1993. On the cover, there is an artistic rendering of an episode of Mohini-lila from the Bhagavata Purana. This depiction is used to illustrate the puranic text under discussion. The audio files are available online.

=== Happiness is a Science ===
Happiness is a Science – Aditi's Vow is a 20th-century Hindu theological commentary made in 1993 by Tamal Krishna Goswami in regard to the Goddess Aditi as detailed in the eighth canto of the Bhagavata Purana. This commentary discusses Aditi's vow, Payovrata, which she undertakes for the benefit of her children the Adityas.

In the narrative, Mahabali Maharaja, king of the demons, had conquered the heavenly planets and driven out their rulers, the Ādityas – Aditi's children. The commentary by Tamal Krishna Goswami centers on Aditi's sacrifice in which she undertook a vow of importance (the vow which is referenced is Payovrata) and discusses why Aditi undertook this vow or vrata in order to bring her children back to the heavenly planets.

This commentary was released as a vinyl album in 1993. The audio files are available online.

=== Books ===
- Servant of the Servant. Los Angeles: Bhaktivedanta Book Trust. 1982. LCCN 82188137. OCLC 12751869. OL 3086416M.
- Jagannātha-priya Nāṭakam – The Drama of Lord Jagannātha. Los Angeles, CA: Bhaktivedanta Book Trust. 1985. ISBN 978-0-947259-01-3. LCCN 85030828. OCLC 35022702. OL 11573482M.

Audiocassettes plus book.

- Schweig, Graham M., ed. (1988). Prabhupāda Antya-Līlā – The Final Pastimes of Śrīla Prabhupāda. Washington, D.C.: Institute for Vaishnava Studies, Cultural Publications. ISBN 978-0-936979-01-4. OCLC 79304556. OL 11507245M.
- Science of Yoga: The Story of Li Kuang Shi. Los Angeles, CA: Bhaktivedanta Book Trust. 1989. ISBN 978-0-89213-147-1. LCCN 89000086. OCLC 19125398. OL 2182408M.

Published as Yoga for the 21st Century in 1994 and Yoga for the New Millennium in 2000 (ISBN 978-0-9643485-0-9).

- Reason & Belief: Problem Solving in the Philosophy of Religion. Dallas, TX: Pundits Press. 1997. ISBN 978-0-9643485-1-6. LCCN 97067193. OCLC 37862769. OL 706500M.
- A Hare Krishna At Southern Methodist University: Collected Essays 1995–1997. Dallas, TX: Pundits Press. 1998. ISBN 978-0-9643485-2-3. LCCN 98066407. OCLC 39796155. OL 392170M.
- TKG's Diary: Prabhupada's Final Days. Dallas, TX: Pundits Press. 1998. ISBN 978-0-9643485-4-7. OCLC 60194628. OL 11708035M.
- Schweig, Graham M., ed. (2012). A Living Theology of Krishna Bhakti: Essential Teachings of A. C. Bhaktivedanta Swami Prabhupāda. New York: Oxford University Press. doi:10.1093/acprof:oso/9780199796632.001.0001. ISBN 978-0-19-979663-2. LCCN 2011050785. OCLC 7335553355. OL 36300240M.

== See also ==
- Vishnujana Swami
- List of ISKCON members and patrons
