= Bhakti Charu Swami =

Indian ISKCON spiritual leader (1945–2020)

His Holiness Bhakti Charu Swami
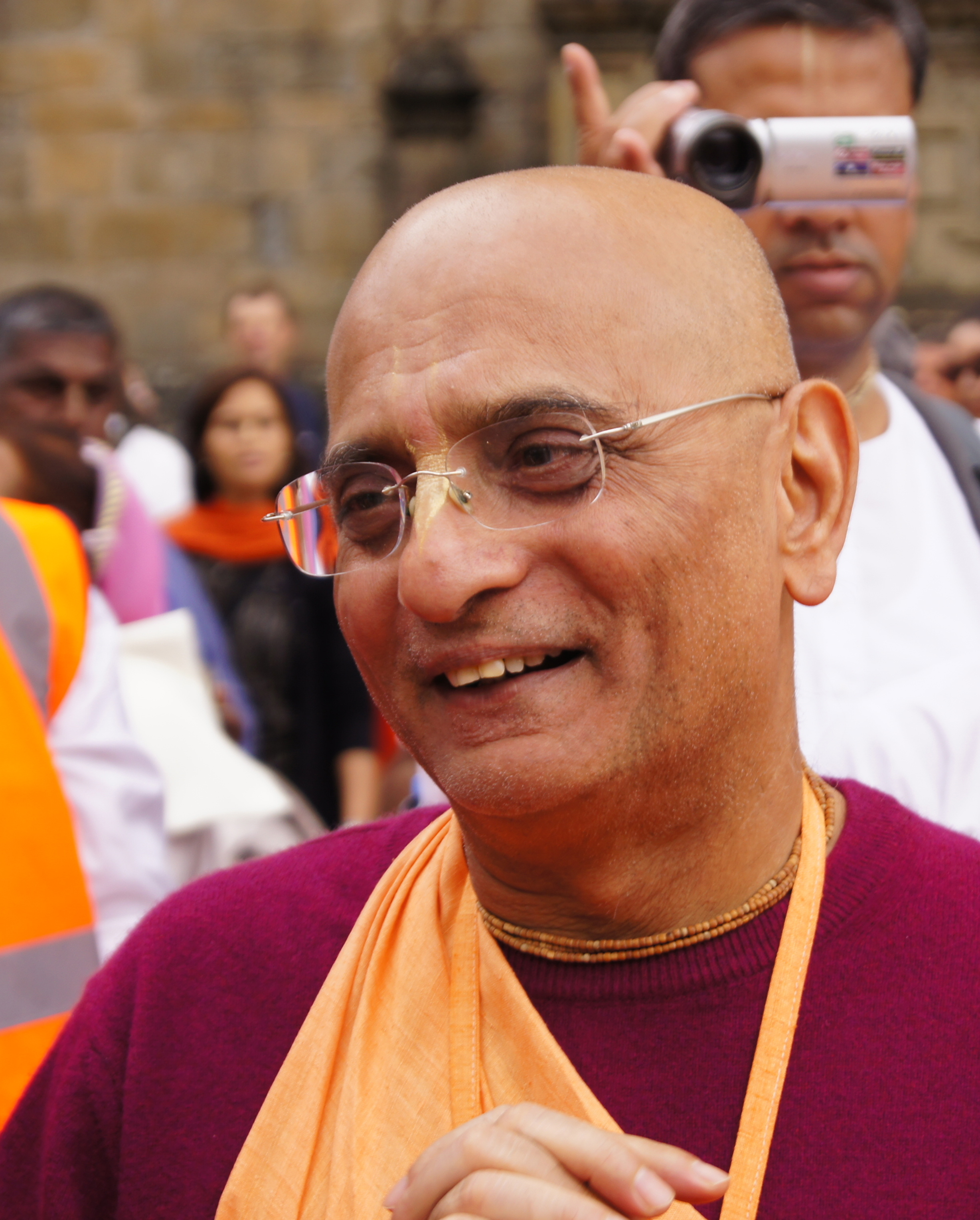
- Swami in 2012

Personal life
- Born: 17 September 1945 Kuti, Brahmanbaria District, Bengal Presidency
- Died: 4 July 2020 (aged 74) Florida, United States
- Website: http://www.bhakticharuswami.com/

Religious life
- Religion: Gaudiya Vaishnavism, Hinduism
- Initiation: Harinama, Brahmana and Sannyasa Diksha (1977)

Senior posting
- Post: ISKCON Guru, Sannyasi, Member of the Governing Body Commission
- Predecessor: A. C. Bhaktivedanta Swami Prabhupada

Bhakti Charu Swami (IAST: Bhakti Cāru Svāmī, 17 September 1945 – 4 July 2020) was an Indian spiritual leader of the International Society for Krishna Consciousness (ISKCON). He was also a disciple of ISKCON's founder A. C. Bhaktivedanta Swami Prabhupada.

== Early life ==
Swami was born in 1945 into an aristocratic Bengali family and spent his early childhood in Kolkata. After leaving India in 1970 for further education, he attended university in Germany to study chemistry. While there, he spent time researching ancient Vedic scriptures.

== Career ==
After reading The Nectar of Devotion written by Srila Prabhupada, Swami joined the International Society for Krishna Consciousness (ISKCON) in Mayapur, West Bengal, India. His first meeting with Srila Prabhupada took place in January 1977 during the 'Maha' Kumbha Mela at Prayagraj. Srila Prabhupada instructed him to translate all of his books into Bengali and become his Secretary for Indian Affairs. He was given his first and second initiation in Sridham Mayapur during the Gaura Purnima festival in March 1977. Shortly thereafter, during the Snana Yatra festival in Vrindavan, Prabhupada awarded him the renounced order of sannyasa. He later became the GBC (Governing Body Commissioner) Chairman in 1989 and then again in 2017. Maharaja continued to translate many of Srila Prabhupada's books into Bengali until their completion in 1996, which was the centennial anniversary of Srila Prabhupada's appearance.

Thereafter, he was involved in writing, producing, and directing the biographical video series, 'Abhay Charan'. With over 100 episodes and broadcasts on Indian National Television, reaching more than 4 million viewers in just a few months, the series chronologically portrayed Srila Prabhupada's life and achievements.

He further went on to develop the ISKCON project in Ujjain, Madhya Pradesh, India, where Lord Sri Krishna, along with his brother Balarama and friend Sudama received their education from Maharishi Sandipani. Under Maharaj's leadership, a marble temple was inaugurated in less than 10 months in February 2006. As the resident GBC of that area, he continued to oversee the development of the project and the preaching programmes in Madhya Pradesh as well as its surrounding areas.

The Ujjain ISKCON temple under the direction of Bhakti Charu Swami feeds more than 23,000 school children per day. To facilitate this feeding project, Bhakti Charu Swami built a 6,000 sq. ft. (560 m2) industrial kitchen. He was the Chairman of Annamrita Foundation, ISKCON's midday meals programme, which fed 1.7 million children across India.

He has also established a department in Ujjain which produces decorated altars, murtis and deity dresses for devotees and ISKCON temples all over the world.

In 2013, he oversaw the development of a new ISKCON temple in Panihati (West Bengal) – a holy place in the Gaudiya Vaishnava tradition, the home of Raghava Pandit and the place of Lord Nityananda's Flattened Rice (Chida Dahi) Festival.

In 2014, he established Arogya Niketan, a traditional Ayurvedic health clinic in Ujjain.

In the same year, he joined Artha Forum and began delivering keynote speeches globally on spirituality to business leaders.

He found and established I-Foundation, a Hindu charity organisation in the United Kingdom.

In 2016, Bhakti Charu Swami wrote a memoir, "Ocean of Mercy – A Search Fulfilled", which is a recollection of his interactions with Srila Prabhupada. This book describes how he developed his love and dedication for Srila Prabhupada.

On 17 November 2016, the Institute of International Social Development – New York, an NGO in Special Consultative Status with the Economic and Social Council (ECOSOC) of the United Nations awarded an accolade to Bhakti Charu Swami, for his work with ISKCON.

He had started a new project called 'Veda Foundation and Cow Sanctuary' which is situated in Deland, Florida, and stretches across an expanse of 120 acres. His mission there was to propagate the Vedic culture and wisdom more simply in the West through setting in motion farm communities and visual media.

== Death ==
Bhakti Charu Swami tested positive for COVID-19 during the COVID-19 pandemic in Florida and a few days later, he died on the 4th of July 2020, at the age of 74.

Following his departure, various leaders in ISKCON expressed heartfelt condolences. HH Jayapataka Maharaj stated the departure of HH Bhakti Charu Swami to be a great loss for ISKCON, and the Executive Committee of ISKCON's Governing Body Commission published a long statement describing Bhakti Charu Swami's contribution to ISKCON and his service in Srila Prabhupada's mission.

== See also ==
- List of ISKCON members and patrons

== Sources ==
- Singh, Thoudam Damodara; Bandyopadhyay, Samaresh (2001), Thoughts on Synthesis of Science And Religion: Srila Prabhupada Birth Centenary Volume, Bhaktivedanta Institute, ISBN 81-901369-0-9
