= Vandana Shiva =

Indian philosopher, scientist and environmentalist

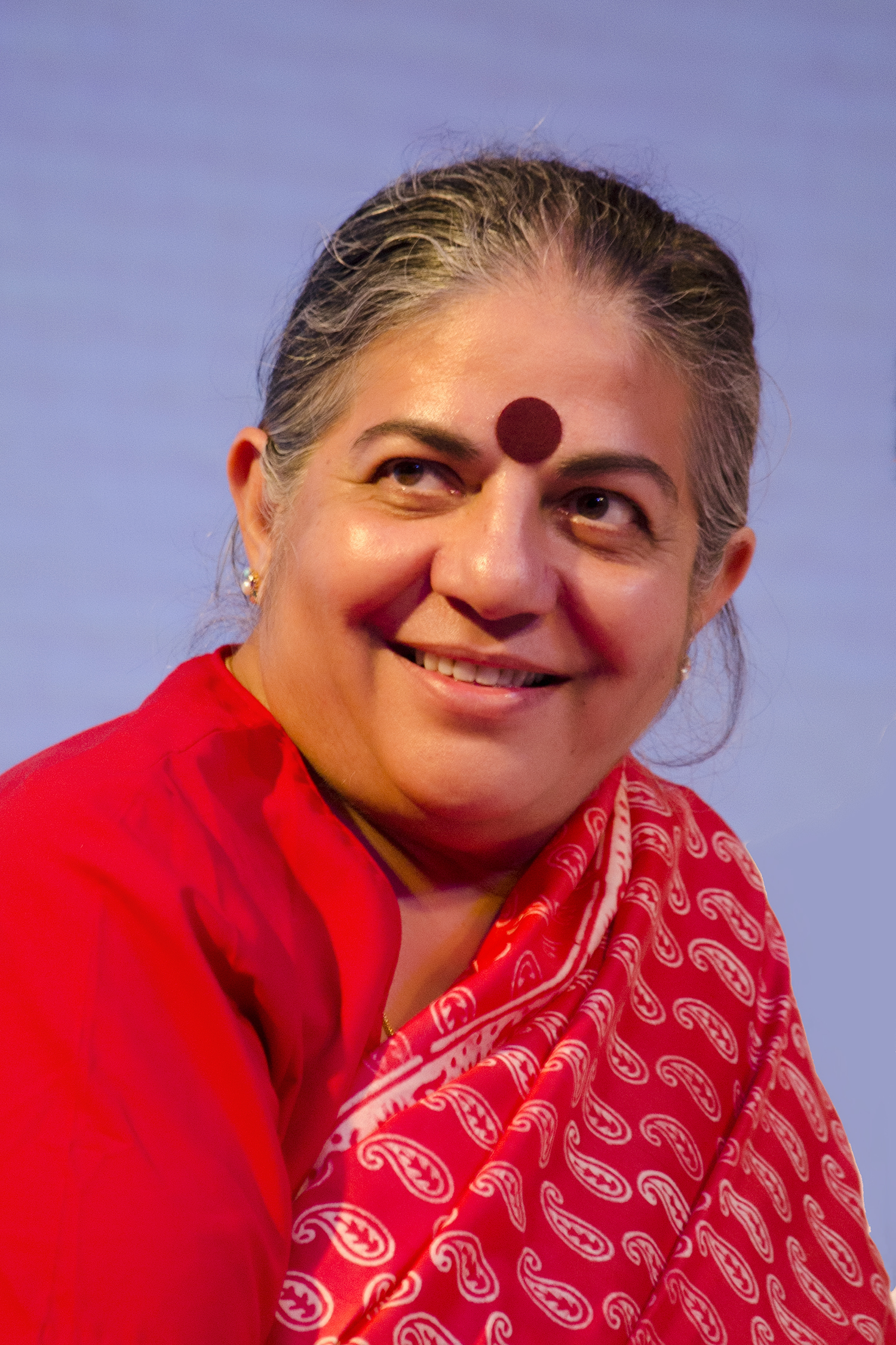
- Shiva in 2014
- Born: 5 November 1952 (age 74); Dehradun, Uttar Pradesh (now in Uttarakhand), India
- Education: Panjab University; University of Guelph; University of Western Ontario
- Occupations: Philosopher, environmentalist, author, professional speaker, social activist, physicist
- Awards: Right Livelihood Award (1993); Sydney Peace Prize (2010); Mirodi Prize (2016); Fukuoka Asian Culture Prize (2012)
- Vandana Shiva's voice from the BBC programme Saving Species, 23 December 2011

Video statement (2014)

Vandana Shiva (born 5 November 1952) is an Indian scholar, environmental activist, food sovereignty advocate, ecofeminist and anti-globalization author. Based in Delhi, Shiva has written more than 20 books. She is often referred to as "Gandhi of grain" for her activism associated with the anti-GMO movement.

Shiva is one of the leaders and board members of the International Forum on Globalization (with Jerry Mander, Ralph Nader, and Helena Norberg-Hodge), and a figure of the anti-globalisation movement. She has argued in favour of many traditional practices, as in her interview in the book Vedic Ecology (by Ranchor Prime). She is a member of the scientific committee of the Fundacion IDEAS, Spain's Socialist Party's think tank. She is also a member of the International Organization for a Participatory Society.

Her book, along with Shreya Jani, called "Slow Living" was published in March 2026. It invites readers to ask themselves what they can do about climate change. It asks readers to be aware and to take small steps to restore the Earth.

== Early life and education ==
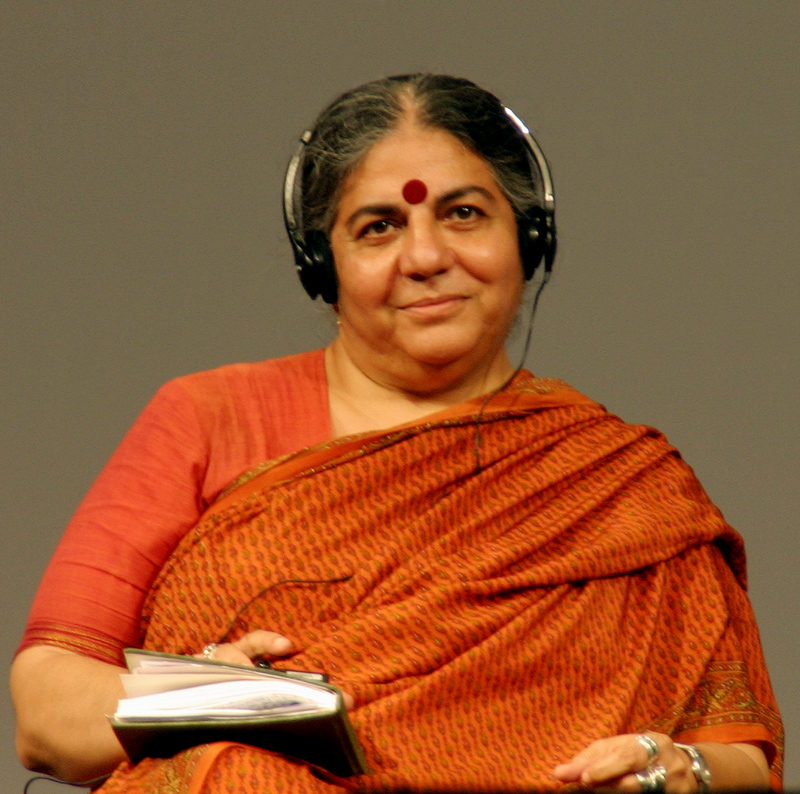
Vandana Shiva in Cologne, Germany, in 2007

Vandana Shiva was born in Dehradun. Her father was a conservator of forests, and her mother was a farmer with a love for nature. She was educated at St. Mary's Convent High School, Nainital, and at the Convent of Jesus and Mary, Dehradun.

Shiva studied physics at Panjab University in Chandigarh, graduating with a Bachelor of Science degree in 1972. After a brief stint at the Bhabha Atomic Research Centre, she moved to Canada to pursue a master's degree in the philosophy of science at the University of Guelph in 1977 where she wrote a thesis entitled "Changes in the Concept of Periodicity of Light". In 1978, she completed and received her PhD in philosophy at the University of Western Ontario, focusing on philosophy of physics; her dissertation was titled "Hidden Variables and Locality in Quantum Theory" in which she discussed the mathematical and philosophical implications of hidden variable theories that fall outside of the purview of Bell's theorem. She later went on to pursue interdisciplinary research in science, technology, and environmental policy at the Indian Institute of Science and the Indian Institute of Management in Bangalore.

== Career ==
Vandana Shiva has written and spoken extensively about advances in the fields of agriculture and food. Intellectual property rights, biodiversity, biotechnology, bioethics, and genetic engineering are among the fields where Shiva has fought through activist campaigns. She has assisted grassroots organisations of the Green movement in Africa, Asia, Latin America, Ireland, Switzerland, and Austria with opposition to advances in agricultural development via genetic engineering.

In 1982, she founded the Research Foundation for Science, Technology and Ecology. This led to the creation of Navdanya in 1991, a national movement to protect the diversity and integrity of living resources, especially native seed, the promotion of organic farming and fair trade. Navdanya, which translates to "Nine Seeds" or "New Gift", is an initiative of the RFSTE to educate farmers of the benefits of maintaining diverse and individualised crops rather than accepting offers from monoculture food producers. The initiative established over 40 seed banks across India to provide regional opportunity for diverse agriculture. In 2004 Shiva started Bija Vidyapeeth, an international college for sustainable living in Doon Valley, Uttarakhand, in collaboration with Schumacher College, UK.

In the area of intellectual property rights and biodiversity, Shiva and her team at the Research Foundation for Science, Technology and Ecology challenged the biopiracy of neem, basmati and wheat.

In 1990, she wrote a report for the FAO on Women and Agriculture titled "Most Farmers in India are Women". She founded the gender unit at the International Centre for Mountain Development (ICIMOD) in Kathmandu and was a founding board member of the Women's Environment & Development Organisation (WEDO). She received the Right Livelihood Award in 1993, an award established by Swedish-German philanthropist Jakob von Uexkull.

Shiva's book Making Peace With the Earth discusses biodiversity and the relationship between communities and nature. "Accordingly, she aligns the destruction of natural biodiversity with the dismantling of traditional communities—those who 'understand the language of nature'". David Wright wrote in a review of the book that to Shiva, "the Village becomes a symbol, almost a metaphor for 'the local' in all nations".

Shiva has also served as an advisor to governments in India and abroad as well as non-governmental organisations, including the International Forum on Globalization, the Women's Environment & Development Organisation and the Third World Network. She chairs the Commission on the Future of Food set up by the Region of Tuscany in Italy and is a member of the Scientific Committee that advised former prime minister Zapatero of Spain. Shiva is a member of the Steering Committee of the Indian People's Campaign Against WTO. She is a councilor of the World Future Council. Shiva serves on Government of India Committees on Organic Farming. She participated in the Stock Exchange of Visions project in 2007.

In 2021, she advised the government of Sri Lanka to ban inorganic fertilizers and pesticides stating "This decision will definitely help farmers become more prosperous. Use of organic fertilizer will help provide agri products rich with nutrients while retaining the fertility of the land." The policy applied overnight, with the main purpose to save State foreign exchange bills on imported fertilizers, caused a crisis with a significant reduction of farming output in several sectors, hitting the tea industry in particular and reducing rice yields were by one third. The ban was overturned seven months later.

== Activism ==
Her work on agriculture started in 1984 after the violence in Punjab and the Bhopal disaster caused by a gas leak from Union Carbide's pesticide manufacturing plant. Her studies for the UN University led to the publication of her book The Violence of the Green Revolution.

In an interview with David Barsamian, Shiva argues that the seed-chemical package promoted by green revolution agriculture has depleted fertile soil and destroyed living ecosystems. In her work Shiva cites data allegedly demonstrating that today there are over 1400 pesticides that may enter the food system across the world.

Shiva is a founding councillor of the World Future Council (WFC). The WFC was formed in 2007 "to speak on behalf of policy solutions that serve the interests of future generations." Their primary focus has been on climate security.

She supports the crime of ecocide being introduced to the International Criminal Court stating "The ideal of limitless growth is leading to limitless violations of the rights of the Earth and of the rights of nature. This is ecocide".

=== Seed freedom ===
Vandana supports the idea of seed freedom, or the rejection of patents on new plant lines or cultivars. She has campaigned against the implementation of the WTO 1994 Trade Related Intellectual Property Rights (TRIPS) agreement, which broadens the scope of patents to include life forms. Shiva has criticised the agreement as having close ties with the corporate sector and opening the door to further patents on life. Shiva calls the patenting of life 'biopiracy', and has fought against attempted patents of several indigenous plants, such as basmati. In 2005, Shiva's was one of the three organisations that won a 10-year battle in the European Patent Office against the biopiracy of Neem by the US Department of Agriculture and the corporation WR Grace. In 1998, Shiva's organisation Navdanya began a campaign against the biopiracy of basmati rice by US corporation RiceTec Inc. In 2001, following intensive campaigning, RiceTec lost most of its claims to the patent.

=== Golden rice ===
Shiva strongly opposes golden rice, a breed of rice that has been genetically engineered to biosynthesise beta-carotene, a precursor of vitamin A. Shiva contends that Golden Rice is more harmful than beneficial in her explanation of what she calls the "Golden Rice hoax": "Unfortunately, Vitamin A rice is a hoax, and will bring further dispute to plant genetic engineering where public relations exercises seem to have replaced science in promotion of untested, unproven and unnecessary technology... This is a recipe for creating hunger and malnutrition, not solving it." Adrian Dubock says that golden rice is as cheap as other rice and vitamin A deficiency is the greatest reason for blindness and causes 28% of global preschool child mortality. Shiva has claimed that the women of Bengal grow and eat 150 greens which can do the same, while environmental consultant Patrick Moore suggests that most of these 250 million children do not eat much else than a bowl of rice a day. In the 2013 report "The economic power of the Golden Rice opposition", two economists, Wesseler and Zilberman from LMU Munich and the University of California, Berkeley respectively calculated that the absence of Golden Rice in India had caused the loss of over 1.4 million lives in the previous ten years.

=== GM, India and suicides ===
In a 2013 opinion piece, Shiva wrote, "Soaring seed prices in India have resulted in many farmers being mired in debt and turning to suicide." She goes on to say that, "The creation of seed monopolies, the destruction of alternatives, the collection of superprofits in the form of royalties, and the increasing vulnerability of monocultures has created a context for debt, suicides, and agrarian distress." She then states that, "According to data from the Indian government, nearly 75 percent of rural debt is due to purchased inputs. Farmers' debt grows as Monsanto profits grow. It is in this systemic sense that GM seeds are those of suicide."

International Food Policy Research Institute (IFPRI) twice analysed academic articles and government data and concluded the decrease and that there was no evidence on "resurgence" of farmer suicide.

== Ecofeminism ==
Shiva plays a major role in the global ecofeminist movement. According to her 2004 article Empowering Women, a more sustainable and productive approach to agriculture can be achieved by reinstating the system of farming in India that is more centred on engaging women. She advocates against the prevalent "patriarchal logic of exclusion," claiming that a woman-focused system would be a great improvement. She believes that ecological destruction and industrial catastrophes threaten daily life, and the maintenance of these problems have become women's responsibility.

Cecile Jackson has criticised some of Shiva's views as essentialist.

Shiva co-wrote the book Ecofeminism in 1993 with "German anarchist and radical feminist sociologist" Maria Mies. It combined Western and Southern feminism with "environmental, technological and feminist issues, all incorporated under the term ecofeminism". These theories are combined throughout the book in essays by Shiva and Mies.

Stefanie Lay described the book as a collection of thought-provoking essays but also found in it a lack of new ecofeminist theories and contemporary analysis, as well as "overall failure to acknowledge the work of others".

== Indian Intelligence Bureau investigation ==
In June 2014, Indian and international media reported that Navdanya and Vandana Shiva were named in a leaked, classified report by India's Intelligence Bureau (IB), which was prepared for the Indian Prime Minister's Office.

The leaked report says that campaigning activities of Indian NGOs such as Navdanya are hampering India's growth and development. In its report, the IB said that Indian NGOs, including Navdanya, receive money from foreign donors under the 'charitable garb' of campaigning for human rights or women's equality, but instead use the money for 'nefarious purposes'. "These foreign donors lead local NGOs to provide field reports which are used to build a record against India and serve as tools for the strategic foreign policy interests of the Western governments," the IB report states.

== Criticism ==
Investigative journalist Michael Specter, in an article in The New Yorker on 25 August 2014 called "Seeds of Doubt", raised concerns over a number of Shiva's claims regarding GMOs and some of her campaigning methods. He wrote: "Shiva's absolutism about G.M.O.s can lead her in strange directions. In 1999, ten thousand people were killed and millions were left homeless when a cyclone hit India's eastern coastal state of Orissa. When the U.S. government dispatched grain and soy to help feed the desperate victims, Shiva held a news conference in New Delhi and said that the donation was proof that 'the United States has been using the Orissa victims as guinea pigs' for genetically-engineered products, although she made no mention that those same products are approved and consumed in the United States. She also wrote to the international relief agency Oxfam to say that she hoped it wasn't planning to send genetically modified foods to feed the starving survivors."

Shiva responded that Specter was "ill informed" and that "for the record, ever since I sued Monsanto in 1999 for its illegal Bt cotton trials in India, I have received death threats", adding that the "concerted PR assault on me for the last two years from Lynas, Specter and an equally vocal Twitter group is a sign that the global outrage against the control over our seed and food, by Monsanto through GMOs, is making the biotech industry panic." David Remnick, the editor of the New Yorker, responded by publishing a letter supporting Specter's article.

Cases of plagiarism have been pointed out against Shiva. Birendra Nayak noted that Shiva copied verbatim from a 1996 article in Voice Gopalpur in her 1998 book Stronger than Steel, and that in 2016, she plagiarised several paragraphs of an article by S Faizi on the Plachimada/Coca-Cola issue published in The Statesman.

Journalist Keith Kloor, in an article published in Discover on 23 October 2014 titled "The Rich Allure of a Peasant Champion", revealed that Shiva charges $40,000 per lecture, plus a business-class air ticket from New Delhi. Kloor wrote: "She is often heralded as a tireless 'defender of the poor,' someone who has courageously taken her stand among the peasant farmers of India. Let it be noted, however, that this champion of the downtrodden doesn't exactly live a peasant's lifestyle."

Stewart Brand in Whole Earth Discipline described some of Shiva's statements as pseudo-scientific, calling her warnings about "heritable sterility" (Stolen Harvest, 2000) a "biological impossibility" but also plagiarism from Geri Guidetti, owner of the seed supplier company Ark Institute, and a "distraction" created by inflating the potential of terminator genes based on a single 1998 patent granted to a US company. Brand also criticised the position of anti-GMO activists, including Shiva, who forced Zambia's government to reject internationally donated corn in 2001-02 because it was "poisoned", as well as during the cyclone disaster in India. On the latter Shiva argued, "emergency cannot be used as market opportunity", to which Brand responded, "anyone who encourages other people to starve on principle should do some of the starving themselves". In 1998 Shiva was also protesting against Bt cotton program in India, calling it "seeds of suicide, seeds of slavery, seeds of despair", claiming she was protecting the farmers. Restrictive laws established in India under anti-GMO lobbying, however, led to widespread grassroots "seed piracy" where Indian farmers illegally planted seeds of Bt cotton and Bt brinjal, obtained either from experimental plantations or from Bangladesh (where they are planted legally) due to increased yield and reduced pesticide usage. As of 2005 over 2.5 million hectares were planted with "unofficial" Bt cotton in India, of which Noel Kingsbury said:

Shiva's "Operation Cremate Monsanto" had spectacularly failed, its anti-GM stance borrowed from Western intellectuals had made no headway with Indian farmers, who showed they were not passive recipients of either technology or propaganda, but could take an active role in shaping their lives. What they did is also perhaps more genuinely subversive of multinational capitalism than anything GM's opponents have ever managed.

— Noel Kingsbury, Hybrid: The History and Science of Plant Breeding (2009)

In India, farmers planting GM crops illegally eventually formed the Shetkari Sanghatana movement, calling for reform of the restrictive laws created under anti-GMO lobbying and as of 2020 an estimated 25% of cotton farmed is GM.

== Science as legacy of exploitation ==
Shiva has repeatedly gone on record characterizing science as "a very narrow, patriarchal project" that has been around only "for a short period of history" and argued that "we name 'science' what is mechanistic and reductionist." She condemns the "kind of science" that "Bacon, Descartes, and others, who are called 'fathers of modern science', have created," because scientists, as she claims, "declare nature as dead" and then use a "mechanistic mode" to analyze it. Shiva assigns the scientific progress of the last centuries to the advance of capitalism, a time when the new exploitation needed a knowledge that would justify it. In her 8 March 2017 speech to the European Parliament, Shiva stated that the "rise of masculinist science with Descartes, Newton, Bacon, led to the domination of [a] reductionist mechanistic science and a subjugation of [the] knowledge systems [that are] based on interconnections and relationships," a knowledge, she argued, that "includes all indigenous knowledge systems, and women’s knowledge."

== Film ==
Vandana Shiva has been interviewed for a number of documentary films including Freedom Ahead, Roshni; Deconstructing Supper: Is Your Food Safe?, The Corporation, Thrive, Dirt! The Movie, Normal is Over, and This is What Democracy Looks Like (a documentary about the Seattle WTO protests of 1999). and Michael Moore and Jeff Gibbs Planet of the Humans.

Shiva's focus on water has caused her to appear in a number of films on this topic. These films include "Ganga From the Ground Up," a documentary on water issues in the river Ganges; Blue Gold: World Water Wars by Sam Bozzo; Irena Salina's documentary Flow: For Love of Water (in competition at the 2008 Sundance Film Festival), and the PBS NOW documentary On Thin Ice.

On the topic of genetically modified crops, she was featured in the documentary Fed Up! (2002), on genetic engineering, industrial agriculture and sustainable alternatives; and the documentary The World According to Monsanto, a film made by the French independent journalist Marie-Monique Robin.

Shiva appeared in a documentary film about the Dalai Lama, entitled Dalai Lama Renaissance.

In 2010, Shiva was interviewed in a documentary about honeybees and colony collapse disorder, entitled Queen of the Sun.

She appears in the French films Demain and Solutions locales pour un désordre global.

In 2016, she appeared in the vegan documentary film H.O.P.E.: What You Eat Matters, where she was critical of the animal agriculture industry and meat-intensive diets.

=== Selected listing ===
- Seeds of Death: Unveiling the Lies of GMOs, 2012
- Another Story of Progress, 2012
- The Farmer and His Prince, 2013
- Creating Freedom: The Lottery of Birth, 2013
- Poverty Inc., 2014
- The True Cost, 2015, a documentary about fast fashion and the garment industry
- Planet of the humans, 2018

== BBC Women of the Year list ==
She was recognized as one of the BBC's 100 women of 2019.

== Publications ==
- 1981, Social Economic and Ecological Impact of Social Forestry in Kolar, Vandana Shiva, H.C. Sharatchandra, J. Banyopadhyay, Indian Institute of Management Bangalore
- 1986, Chipko: India's Civilisational Response to the Forest Crisis, J. Bandopadhyay and Vandana Shiva, Indian National Trust for Art and Cultural Heritage. Pub. by INTACH
- 1987, The Chipko Movement Against Limestone Quarrying in Doon Valley, J. Bandopadhyay and Vandana Shiva, Lokayan Bulletin, 5: 3, 1987, pp. 19–25 online
- 1988, Staying Alive: Women, Ecology and Survival in India, Zed Press, New Delhi, ISBN 0-86232-823-3
- 1989, The Violence of the Green Revolution: Ecological degradation and political conflict in Punjab, Natraj Publishers, New Delhi, ISBN 0-86232-964-7 hb, ISBN 0-86232-965-5 pb
- 1991, Ecology and the Politics of Survival: Conflicts Over Natural Resources in India, Sage Publications, Thousand Oaks, California, ISBN 0-8039-9672-1
- 1992, Biodiversity: Social and Ecological Perspectives (editor); Zed Press, United Kingdom
- 1993, Women, Ecology and Health: Rebuilding Connections (editor), Dag Hammarskjöld Foundation and Kali for Women, New Delhi
- 1993, Monocultures of the Mind: Biodiversity, Biotechnology and Agriculture, Zed Press, New Delhi
- 1993, Ecofeminism, Maria Mies and Vandana Shiva, Fernwood Publications, Halifax, Nova Scotia, Canada, ISBN 1-895686-28-8
- 1994, Close to Home: Women Reconnect Ecology, Health and Development Worldwide, Earthscan, London, ISBN 0-86571-264-6
- 1995, Biopolitics (with Ingunn Moser), Zed Books, United Kingdom
- 1997, Biopiracy: the Plunder of Nature and Knowledge, South End Press, Cambridge Massachusetts, I ISBN 1-896357-11-3
- 2000, Stolen Harvest: The Hijacking of the Global Food Supply, South End Press, Cambridge Massachusetts, ISBN 0-89608-608-9
- 2000, Tomorrow's Biodiversity, Thames and Hudson, London, ISBN 0-500-28239-0
- 2001, Patents, Myths and Reality, Penguin India
- 2002, Water Wars; Privatization, Pollution, and Profit, South End Press, Cambridge Massachusetts
- 2005, India Divided, Seven Stories Press,
- 2005, Globalization's New Wars: Seed, Water and Life Forms, Women Unlimited, New Delhi, ISBN 81-88965-17-0
- 2005, Earth Democracy; Justice, Sustainability, and Peace, South End Press, ISBN 0-89608-745-X
- 2007, Manifestos on the Future of Food and Seed, editor, South End Press ISBN 978-0-89608-777-4
- 2007, Democratizing Biology: Reinventing Biology from a Feminist, Ecological and Third World Perspective, author, Paradigm Publishers ISBN 978-1-59451-204-9
- 2007, Cargill and the Corporate Hijack of India's Food and Agriculture, Navdanya/RFSTE, New Delhi
- 2008, Soil Not Oil, South End Press ISBN 978-0-89608-782-8
- 2010, Staying Alive, South End Press ISBN 978-0-89608-793-4
- 2011, Biopiracy: The Plunder of Nature & Knowledge, Natraj Publishers, ISBN 978-8-18158-160-0
- 2011, Monocultures of the Mind: Perspectives on Biodiversity, Natraj Publishers, ISBN 978-8-18158-151-8
- 2013, Making Peace with the Earth Pluto Press ISBN 978-0-7453-33762
- 2016, "Who Really Feeds the World", North Atlantic Books, Berkeley, California ISBN 978-1623170622
- 2018, Oneness Vs. The 1%: Shattering Illusions, Seeding Freedom, Women Unlimited, ISBN 978-93-85606-18-2
- 2019, Vandana Shiva (2019). "Foreword". In Extinction Rebellion (ed.). This Is Not a Drill: An Extinction Rebellion Handbook. Penguin Books. pp. 5–8. ISBN 9780141991443.
- 2022, Terra Viva: My life in a biodiversity of movements, Chelsea Green Publishing, ISBN 978-1-64502-188-9
- 2024, The Nature of Nature: The Metabolic Disorder of Climate Change, Chelsea Green Publishing, ISBN 978-1-64502-287-9

== See also ==
- Green Revolution in India
- Science and technology studies in India
- List of Indian writers
