= Romapada Swami =

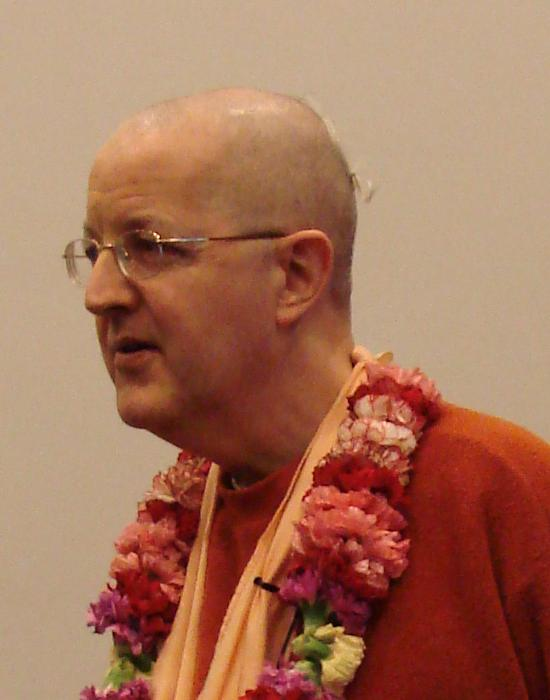
- Title: ISKCON Guru

Personal life
- Born: Brian Rumbaugh; December 27, 1948 (age 77) Utica, New York, United States
- Website: Romapada Swami

Religious life
- Religion: Hinduism

Religious career
- Based in: United States
- Present post: Sannyasi
- Period in office: 1986–2018
- Previous post: Member of the Governing Body Commission; Temple president

Romapada's jurisdiction as the ISKCON zonal secretary of Illinois, Indiana, Iowa, Kansas, Minnesota, Missouri, Nebraska, New Jersey, New York, and Wisconsin.

Romapada Swami (IAST: Roma-pāda Svāmī; born Brian Rumbaugh, December 27, 1948) is a Vaishnava sannyasi, initiating guru and is currently on leave as a governing body commissioner of the International Society for Krishna Consciousness (commonly known as the Hare Krishnas or ISKCON).

== Life and career ==
Romapada Swami is an initiating guru in the International Society for Krishna Consciousness (ISKCON) and one of the leading disciples of A. C. Bhaktivedanta Swami Prabhupada, the founder-acharya of ISKCON. He has been a bhakti-yoga practitioner for over 50 years. He travels extensively across the continental United States and Asia giving invited presentations and workshops at universities, corporates, communities, yoga and cultural centers. He has lectured on Eastern and Western philosophies at universities in the United States, India and Europe.

The youngest of five children, Romapada was born as Brian Rumbaugh and raised in a middle-class Christian family in (Skaneateles, New York) Utica, New York. He attended the State University of New York, Buffalo, where he was a pre-med student. It was here, in 1969, that Brian met A. C. Bhaktivedanta Swami Prabhupada, founder of the International Society for Krishna Consciousness (ISKCON). Shortly after being accepted to Medical school, Brian joined ISKCON. He decided, that by dedicating himself to the spiritual life he would be more useful to the society. Brian became an initiated disciple of A. C. Bhaktivedanta Swami Prabhupada in July 1971, receiving the name Romapada Das (Das meaning the servant of the Lord). He accepted the renounced order of sannyasa in 1983 (whence he was given the title of "Swami").

In the late 1970s and early 1980s, Romapada Swami served in ISKCON as associate director of public affairs (1972–76), as a spokesman, and as a New York ISKCON temple president.

Since 1978, Romapada Swami has traveled worldwide, presenting the Gaudiya Vaishnava philosophy. Since 1986, Romapada Swami has served as an ISKCON diksa guru.

In March 1992, he was appointed Governing Body Commissioner for New York and New Jersey. In 1994 he accepted the same responsibility for the Midwestern United States. Currently he is based in New York, and frequently travels to India and Asia on preaching missions.

Since the past 20 years, he has been taking groups of bhakti practitioners annually to various holy places spread across the entire Indian subcontinent.
