= Jayananda Dasa =

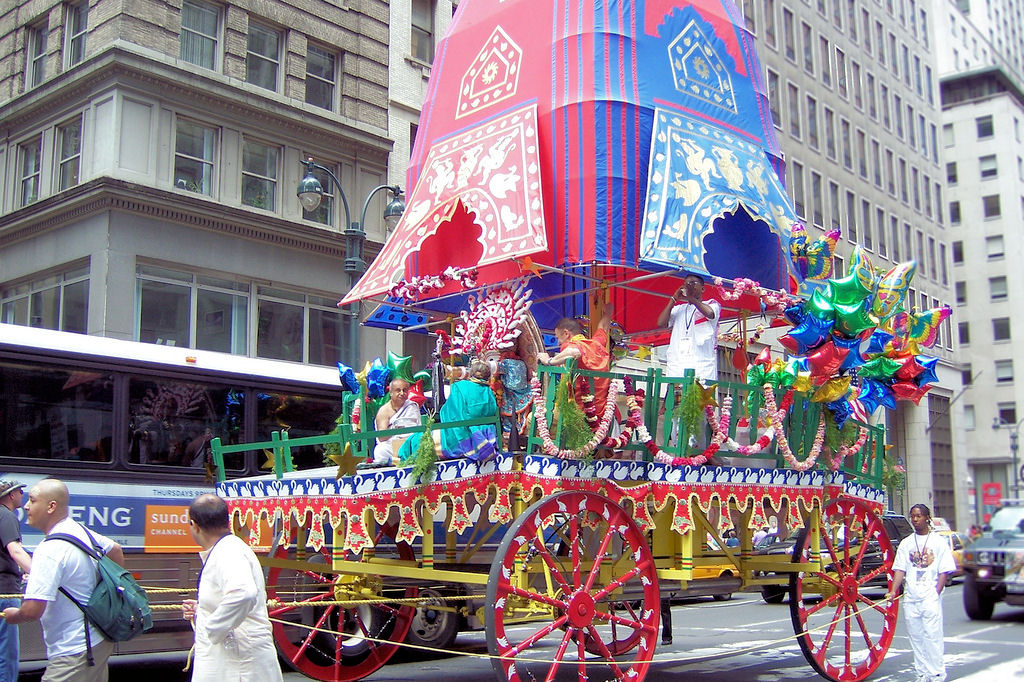
Ratha Yatra festival in New York City organized by ISKCON

Jayananda Dasa (IAST: Jayānanda Dāsa) was an influential religious figure in the International Society for Krishna Consciousness (ISKCON) in San Francisco between 1967 and 1977. ISKCON views Jayananda Dasa as a saint. Jayananda's guru, Srila A. C. Bhaktivedanta Swami Prabhupada, said that he was proud that he had such a good disciple as Jayananda, and when Jayananda left his body (died), Prabhupada said: "Jayananda went back home to Godhead."

Born Jim Kohr in Dayton, Ohio, he graduated from Ohio State in 1962 with a degree in industrial engineering. Jayananda was employed as a cab driver in San Francisco when he first came into contact with Srila Prabhupada. Jayananda helped found an ISKCON center there in 1967 and later became the president of the temple. He was instrumental in organizing the first ISKCON Ratha Yatra festival, which is now held every summer in San Francisco and is a day of public holiday in the city.

== See also ==
- Vishnujana Swami
- List of ISKCON members and patrons
