= Giriraja Swami =

American hindu author and high-ranking member of ISKCON

Giriraj Swami
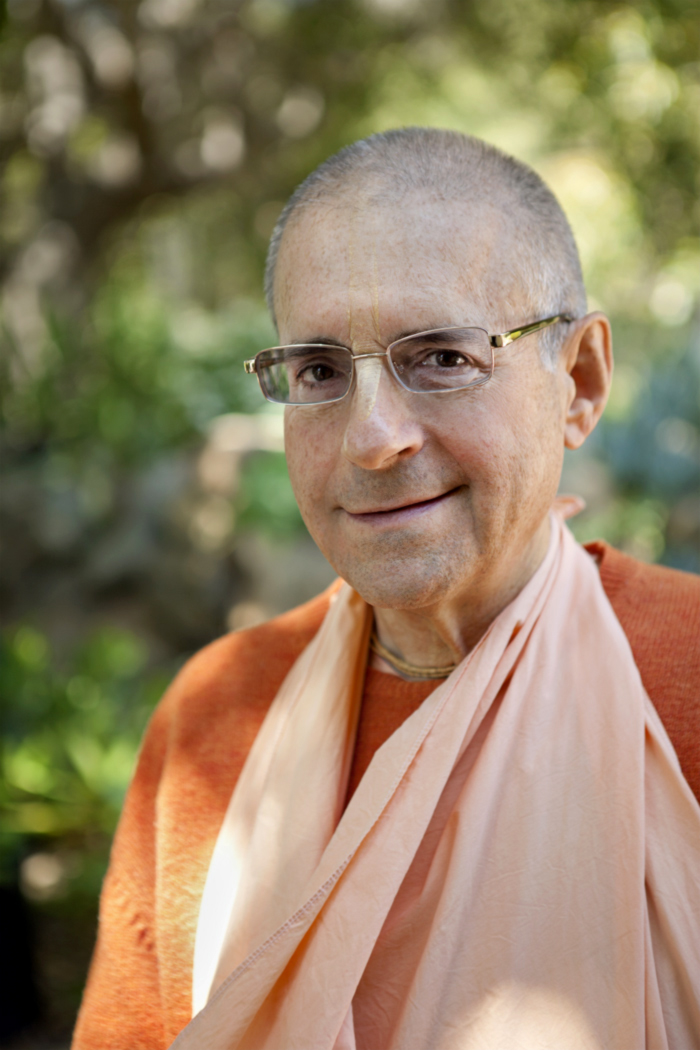

Personal life
- Born: September 13, 1947 (age 79) Chicago, Illinois, United States
- Other name: Glenn Phillip Teton
- Website: http://www.girirajswami.com

Religious life
- Religion: Gaudiya Vaishnavism, Hinduism
- Initiation: Diksa–1969, Sannyasa–1978

Senior posting
- Post: ISKCON Guru, Sannyasi, Member of the Governing Body Commission

Giriraj Swami (IAST: Giri-rāja Svāmī; born Glenn Phillip Teton September 13, 1947) is an American Hindu author and an initiating guru, with high-ranking position in the International Society for Krishna Consciousness (ISKCON).

== Background ==
Glenn P. Teton is the only son of Alfred B. Teton, a Chicago lawyer who was later appointed judge. In March 1969, while studying at Brandeis University in Boston, he met A. C. Bhaktivedanta Swami Prabhupada, founder and original acharya of the ISKCON. After graduating, he accepted formal initiation from Prabhupada and received the spiritual name Giriraj Das.

In 1972, Giriraj was appointed by Prabhupada as president of ISKCON Bombay and trustee of the Bhaktivedanta Book Trust. He subsequently oversaw the development of Hare Krishna Land in Juhu, Bombay. He was also involved in the acquisition and development of Bhaktivedanta Ashram in Govardhan, as well as projects such as the Kirtan Ashram for women, the Bhaktivedanta Hospice, and the Vrindavan Institute of Palliative Care. Giriraj Swami has also taught at the Vrindavan Institute for Higher Education.

In 1978, Giriraj took sannyasa (the renounced order of life) and was appointed president of ISKCON's board of trustees in India.

In 1982, he was appointed to ISKCON's Governing Body Commission and oversaw ISKCON activities in areas such as Bombay, Mauritius, South Africa, Spain, Portugal, Sri Lanka, and Pakistan.

== Books ==
- Watering the Seed, Giriraj Swami, Publisher: Mountain King (2000), ASIN: B000K9PRVS.
- Watering the Seed – With Teachings from His Divine Grace A.C. Bhaktivedanta Swami Prabhupada (revised and expanded), Giriraj Swami, Publisher: Torchlight (2012), ISBN 978-0-9817273-3-2.
- Many Moons: Reflections on Departed Vaishnavas, Giriraj Swami, Publisher: Torchlight (2012), ISBN 978-1-937731-01-4.
- Life's Final Exam: Death and Dying from the Vedic Perspective, edited by Giriraj Swami, Publisher: Torchlight (2013), ISBN 978-1937731120.
- I'll Build You a Temple: The Juhu Story, Giriraj Swami, Publisher: Bhaktivedanta Book Trust (2020), ISBN 978-1-925850-01-7.
- Dancing White Elephants: Traveling with Srila Prabhupada in India, August 1970–March 1972, Giriraj Swami, Publisher: Bhaktivedanta Book Trust (2023), ISBN 978-1-925850-03-1.
