= Ravi M. Gupta =

Indian religious scholar, author and editor

- Education: Boise State University; University of Oxford
- Occupations: Professor, author, editor
- Notable work: The Caitanya Vaiṣṇava Vedānta of Jīva Gosvāmī: When Knowledge Meets Devotion (2007); The Bhāgavata Purāṇa: Sacred Text and Living Tradition (2013); Caitanya Vaiṣṇava Philosophy: Tradition, Reason and Devotion (2014); The Bhāgavata Purāṇa: Selected Readings (2016)

Ravi M. Gupta, also known as Radhika Ramana Dasa (IAST: Rādhikā Ramaṇa Dāsa), is a notable Vaishnava scholar, author, and editor. Gupta holds the Charles Redd Chair of Religious Studies at Utah State University, and serves as director of its Religious Studies program. He is a member of the International Society for Krishna Consciousness.

== Early life and education ==
In Boise, Idaho, he was raised and home-schooled along with his younger brother with a curriculum based mostly on the Srimad Bhagavatam (Bhagavata Purana), from which he learned English, comprehension skills, critical thinking, debate, and communication. He also took maths and science as separate subjects, as well as Sanskrit, which he loved.

At the age of thirteen he enrolled at the Boise State University, and in 1999 when he was seventeen he received a Bachelor of Arts in Philosophy and a Bachelor of Science in Applied Mathematics as well as the university's highest honor, the Silver Medallion. He recalls,

On my first day, the chair of the English department sent me to the honors writing course because all the introductory classes were full. At first, I was so intimidated by the curriculum. Rather than contemporary novels and story books, it was full of classical literature like Shakespeare, the Iliad and the Odyssey. But everything changed when I realized how similar they were to our own epics in many ways. Homer's Odyssey spoke about valiant warriors and their code of ethics, just like the Mahabharata. And the conflicts Shakespeare's Hamlet faced were very similar to those of Arjuna in the Bhagavad Gita.

He enrolled at the University of Oxford at the age of seventeen, the youngest student ever at the Oxford Centre for Hindu Studies, and in 2000 he received a Master of Studies (MSt) in the Study of Religion.

In 2004, he received a Doctor of Philosophy (DPhil) in Hinduism from the University of Oxford. At the age of twenty-two, he received his doctorate at the University of Oxford. His thesis focused on the early development of Vedanta philosophy in the Chaitanya Vaishnava tradition, based on original manuscript sources.

== Career ==
In addition to his work at Utah State, Gupta has taught at the University of Florida, Centre College, and the College of William & Mary.

Gupta holds the Charles Redd Chair of Religious Studies and serves as director of the Religious Studies Program at Utah State University, and was a visiting scholar at the Maxwell Institute during fall 2020. He is a permanent research fellow of the Oxford Centre for Hindu Studies and a past president of the Society for Hindu-Christian Studies.

His research areas are world religions, Hinduism, Sanskrit, and religious studies (theory and method). His research interests include the Bhagavata Purana's Sanskrit commentaries, Vaishnava bhakti traditions, interreligious dialogue, and the relationship between faith, scholarship, religion and ecology.

== Selected publications ==
Books

- Gupta, Ravi M. (2007). The Caitanya Vaiṣṇava Vedānta of Jīva Gosvāmī: When Knowledge Meets Devotion. Foreword by Flood, Gavin. London: Routledge. ISBN 978-0-415-40548-5.
- Gupta, Ravi M.; Valpey, Kenneth R., eds. (2013). The Bhāgavata Purāṇa: Sacred Text and Living Tradition. New York: Columbia University Press. ISBN 978-0-231-14999-0.
- Gupta, Ravi M., ed. (2014). Caitanya Vaiṣṇava Philosophy: Tradition, Reason and Devotion. London: Ashgate Publishing. ISBN 978-0-754-66177-1.
- Gupta, Ravi M.; Valpey, Kenneth R. (2016). The Bhāgavata Purāṇa: Selected Readings. Foreword by Brown, C. Mackenzie. New York: Columbia University Press. ISBN 978-0-231-54234-0.
