= Jayapataka Swami =

Spiritual guru

His Holiness Jayapataka Swami Acāryapāda
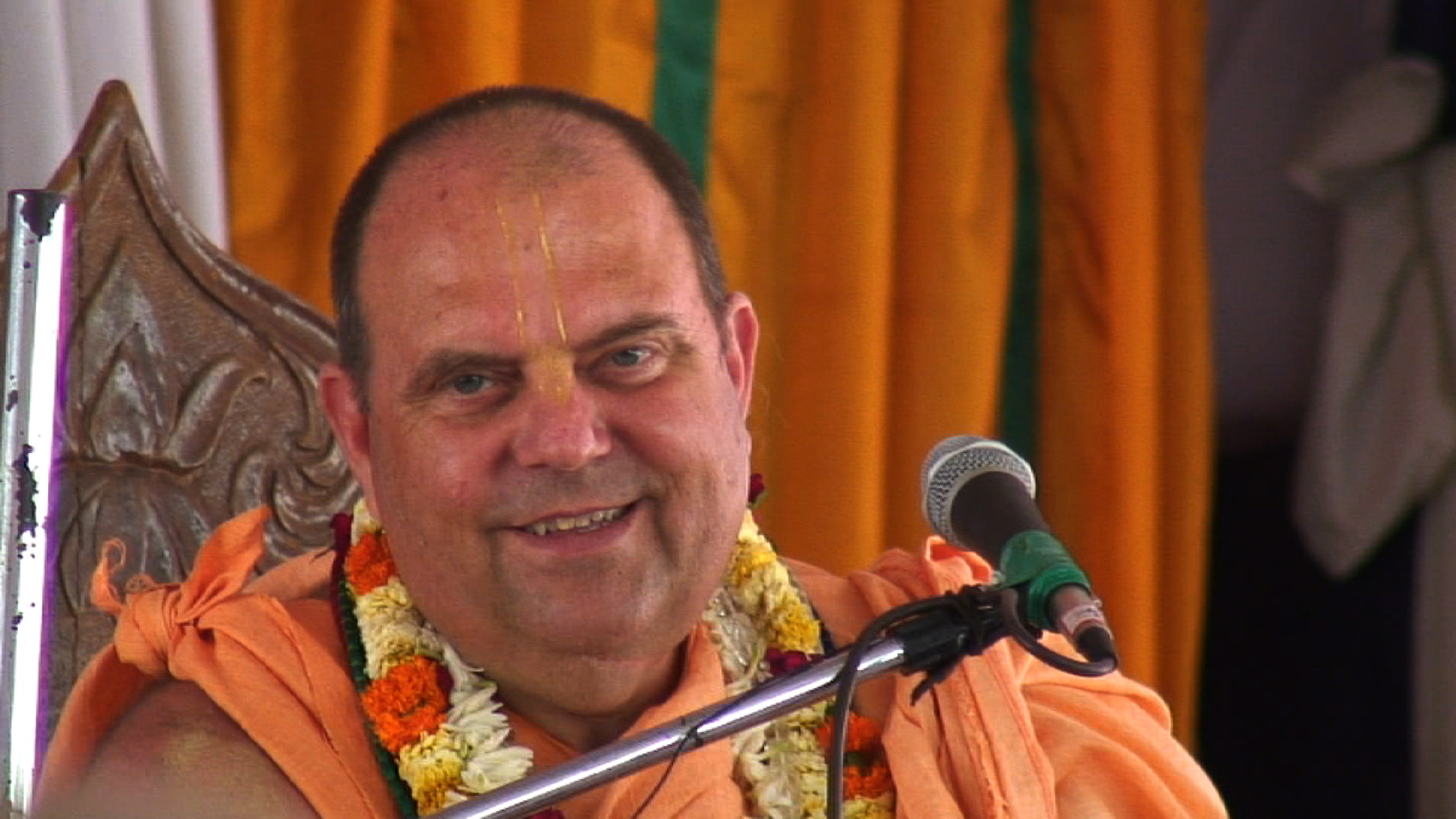
- Svāmī in 2006
- Title: Ācharyapāda

Personal life
- Born: Gordon John Erdman II; April 9, 1949 (age 77) Milwaukee, Wisconsin, U.S.

Religious life
- Religion: Hinduism
- Philosophy: Achintya Bheda Abheda
- School: Vaiṣṇavism
- Lineage: Brahma-Madhva-Gauḍīya Sampradāya
- Sect: Gauḍīya Vaiṣṇavism
- Monastic name: Jaya-patākā Svāmī
- Ordination: Gauḍīya Sannyāsa, 1970, Calcutta, by Bhaktivedānta Swāmī
- Initiation: Gauḍīya Vaiṣṇava Dīkṣā; 1968; Montreal, Canada by Bhaktivedānta Swāmī

Religious career
- Teacher: A. C. Bhaktivedānta Swāmī
- Post: ISKCON Sannyasin, ISKCON Guru-Ācārya, ISKCON Governing Body Commissioner
- Predecessor: A. C. Bhaktivedānta Swāmī

Jayapataka Swami (IAST: Jaya-patākā Svāmī); born on April 9, 1949) is a Vaishnava swami and a religious leader for the International Society for Krishna Consciousness (ISKCON). He is a senior disciple of A. C. Bhaktivedanta Swami Prabhupada. In 2004, he was one of the initiating spiritual masters, (ISKCON Gurus), a member of the Governing Body Commission (GBC), and a divisional trustee for the Bhaktivedanta Book Trust (BBT). He is one of the senior-most sannyasis in the Hare Krishna movement.

== Biography ==
Jayapataka Swami was born in Milwaukee, Wisconsin as Gordon John Erdman II to Gordon John Erdman and Lorraine Erdman (Golich). He attended St. John's Northwestern Military Academy and Brown University. There, as a fresh enrollee, he was influenced by a guest lecture on the life of Buddha, which caused him to lose interest in his studies and begin searching for a spiritual teacher. After some time of searching, Erdman concluded that he would have to go to India to find his teacher.

Before leaving for India, Erdman came across some Hare Krishna devotees, doing kirtan and distributing Back To Godhead magazine. Shortly after, he visited the San Francisco ISKCON center and met Jayananda das, who introduced him to the Ratha Yatra festival. His first service in ISKCON was to help build the Ratha Cart. From there, Erdman traveled to Montreal, where he met Srila Prabhupada. Erdman took first initiation in Montreal and was given the name 'Jayapataka dasa'. Soon after he was awarded 2nd initiation in New York.

While in Montreal, Jayapataka dasa was engaged in the service of printing books and dispatching them to other ISKCON temples around the world. Later, on the instruction of Srila Prabhupada, Jayapataka went to Toronto to open a temple there. When Jayapataka dasa took over the Toronto center as president, he wrote to Srila Prabhupada enquiring about his service and was told by him to go to India.
