= Pragosha Dasa =

Chairman of International Society for Krishna Consciousness

Praghosh Das was born in Dublin. He is a former chairman of ISKCON's Governing Body Commission (GBC). He was member of the GBC between 2001 and 2022. He was the commission's chairman in 2005. Praghosh was editor in chief of the Dandavats Vaishnava news agency.
