= Navadhanya =

Nine essential grains in Indian cuisine

Navdhānya or Navadhaniyam refers to nine important food grains in Indian cuisine: wheat, paddy, pigeon pea, hyacinth bean, chickpea, mung bean, sesame, black gram and horse gram. The term Navdhānya literally means "nine grains" in several Indian languages.

== Hindu theology ==
In Hindu cosmology, Navadhānya are considered to represent the Navagraha (nine planets). The grains represent the following nodes:

Navagrahas:
No.	Image	Name	Western equivalent	Day	Food grain
1.		Surya	Sun	Sunday	Wheat
2.		Chandra	Moon	Monday	Paddy
3.		Mangala	Mars	Tuesday	Chickpea
4.		Budha	Mercury	Wednesday	Mung bean
5.		Bṛhaspati	Jupiter	Thursday	Bengal gram
6.		Shukra	Venus	Friday	White bean
7.		Shani	Saturn	Saturday	Black sesame
8.		Rahu	Ascending node of the Moon		Black gram
9.		Ketu	Descending node of the Moon		Horse gram

== Worship and rituals ==
It is customary for Hindus to use Navdanya during certain rituals and auspicious events. Traditional Hindu initiation ceremonies such as Upanayana and Vidyāraṃbhaṃ involve the offering of navadhanya. During festivals such as Saraswati Puja, a new scroll and writing equipment are placed on the navadhanya.

In Mariamman worship in South India, the sprouts of these food grains, traditionally known as mullaipaari forms an important part of festivals and rituals. The seeds are grown on temporary trays or pots and are either allowed to sprout in the temple or carried to the temples after sprouting. If the seeds sprout healthily, it is considered as a good sign and an indication of an upcoming good harvest.
