= ISKCON guru system =

Aspect of the Hare Krishna movement

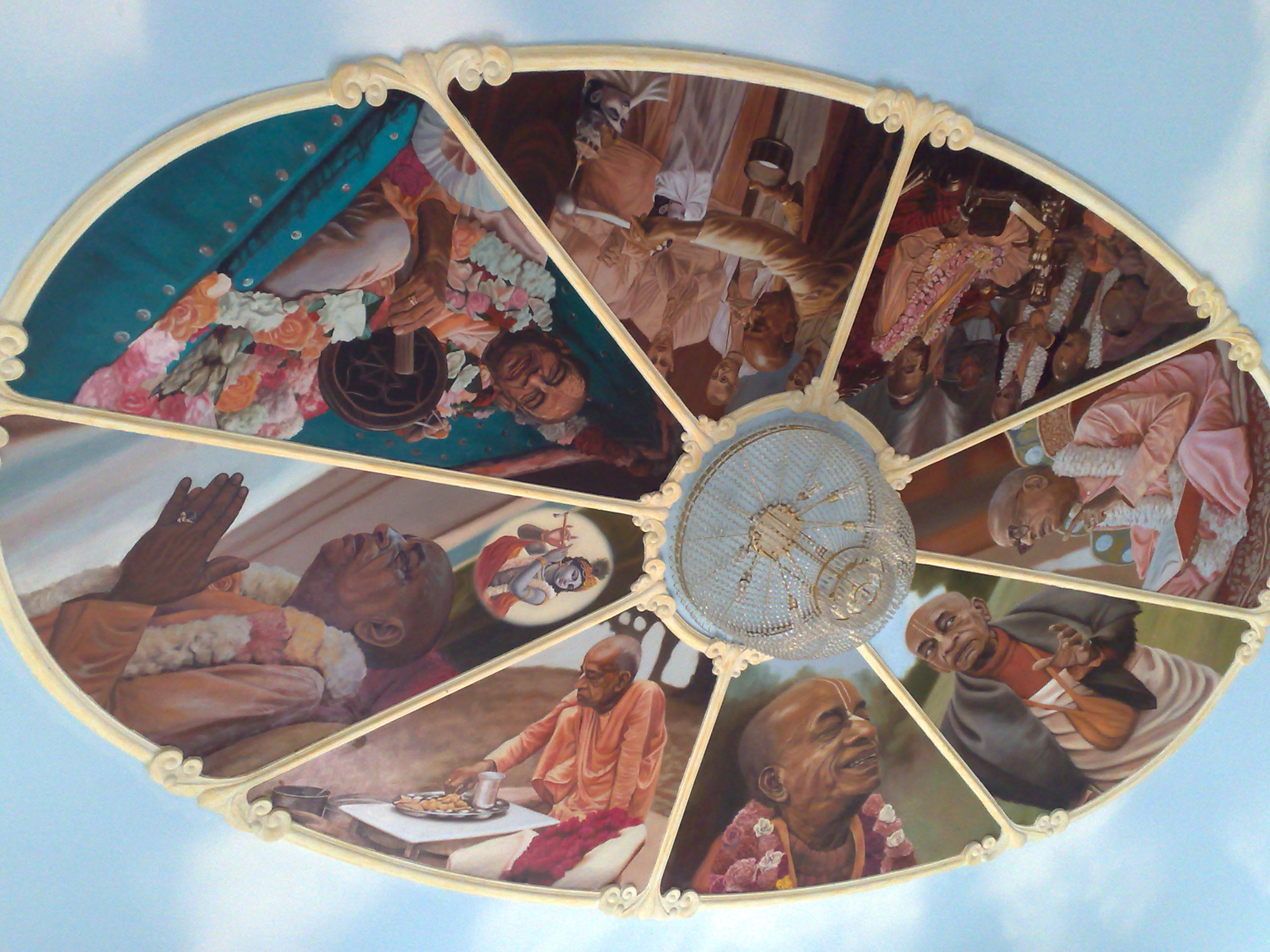
Images on the dome of the samadhi of Prabhupada, pre-eminent siksa guru to all ISKCON devotees.

An ISKCON guru is a person who is permitted to initiate disciples into the International Society for Krishna Consciousness system. The guru system has undergone several changes and reform since its beginnings in the 1960s. Upanayana as a traditional "sacred thread ceremony" of the Gayatri Mantra, commonly known Hindu Samskara, is complemented by Pancharatra mantras of the Gaudiya Vaishnava sampradaya and follows the principal initial nama initiation ceremony, referred to respectively as brahmana diksa and Hari nama diksa.

== Etymology ==
ISKCON Gaudiya Vaishnavas often refer to the Amarakośa, a Sanskrit thesaurus, for meanings of words, and according to the writings of the Gaudiya acharyas, the word guru is very often defined as one who represents the Supreme Lord, does not invent new teachings, but teaches in accordance with the scriptures (sastra) and the previous ācāryas. This definition of a wider concept of guru in Hinduism links the question of the relative authority of the guru's words and those of the sastra in a crucial relationship. Baladeva Vidyabhushana, 18th century principal Gaudiya theologian used and defined guru in his commentaries on Vedanta-sutra. Specifically, in the comments to the sutras 3.3.44-45 Baladeva Vidyabhushana argues that the concept of guru's grace plays the central role in the system of teacher-student succession."

== Philosophy ==
Scriptural evidence towards the issue of a guru lies mainly in a large volume of Sanskrit work named Hari Bhakti Vilasa which received commentary by Sanatana Gosvami. It is the foundation of traditional Vaishnava philosophy and has 9,275 verses, divided in twenty chapters (called vilasas). The first chapter is dedicated to gurus, with second dedicated to ritual process of initiation by the guru. The worship of gurus is described towards the end of the third vilasa.

The place of a guru and his grace (prasada) plays a vital role in the Vaisnava traditions in general and in ISKCON Gaudiya Vaishnavism in particular. The generic view on a guru as a representative of God is a central feature to the tradition and philosophy:

God and the soul combine in their own ways within the archetype of the spiritual guide. For both, the spiritual master is a type of extraordinary confluence of divinity and humanity, as each tradition exalts ways in which the guide becomes directly and effectively the grace of God in the flesh.

— Graham M. Schweig

In contrast with the established traditional view of ISKCON, some rare sahajia groups in Bengal treat their own preceptor (guru) as the living God. This view is different or contrasted to the concept of a guru being "as good as God".

Unlike being a god in a human form, the process of being appointed as a guru within ISKCON is currently done by a process which could be described as consensual or democratic and involves voting. It is suggested that being as good as god is not a theological but a practical consideration, just as a wife serves her husband in Hindu traditions "as good as god".

While the claim "submission of the disciple is neither irrational or blind" is arguable, the question of qualification and humility remained opened for generations prior to creation of ISKCON in the West. In his speech Assuming Responsibility of Being Guru Bhaktisiddhanta Sarasvati, who founded the popular branch of the Gaudiya Vaishnava tradition that resulted in creation of ISKCON, underlined the contrast of humility and responsibility of the performance of the duties of being a guru:

He whose only teaching is humility greater than that of a blade of grass (Caitanya Mahaprabhu), said: "By My command being guru save this land!" In this instance Mahaprabhu Himself has given the command. His command being "Perform the duty of the guru, even as I do it Myself. Also convey this command to whom-so-ever you chance to meet."

— Bhaktisiddhanta Sarasvati. 1934

It has been seen that much of the debate over authority and continuity over the years has focused on one issue: namely, whether current GBC members and gurus are spiritually qualified. Guru in a post-charismatic phase of ISKCON is a subject of number studies and debates.

According to the Bhaktisiddhanta Sarasvati ceremony of diksha in Gaudiya Vaisnavism, also called initiation, is that "by which the spiritual preceptor admits one to the status of a neophyte on the path of spiritual endeavor."

== Parallel lines of authority ==
ISKCON is seen as an extension of the Gaudiya-Vaishnava tradition and thus participates in the disciplic succession from Caitanya Mahaprabhu. In most Indic traditions spiritual authority rests in one person, or acharya, head of a monastery or a whole sampradaya. ISKCON is sometimes described as the "first global Vaisnava movement" and is different. ISKCON is a multi-guru organization that places the ultimate managerial authority in its Governing Body, a group rather than a single person. Current ISKCON Guru System is developed by the group of leaders, Governing Body Commission, (GBC), the managerial authority of the International Society for Krishna Consciousness. ISKCON Guru system was originally initiated and put in place by ISKCON's founder, A.C. Bhaktivedanta Swami Prabhupada who organized and sometimes himself conducted initiations since the early 1970s. Currently the GBC is entrusted with both spiritual and secular leadership of the ISKCON communities, as well as the power to appoint new gurus. According to a GBC confidence survey "those holding critical views of the GBC were far less committed to ISKCON" and it was also noted that householder members of ISKCON provides less support for ISKCON's gurus and the guru institution than the residents of ISKCON asramas controlled by GBC. In recent years GBC started to develop a regional seminar "Spiritual Leadership: Being a Guru in ISKCON" and made it mandatory for all future gurus to attend. The course is based on the work of a group of seniors representing cross section of international devotees and is developed in coordination with Vaisnava Training and Education, the Guru Services Committee of GBC. It was launched in Ujjain just prior to the 2008 annual GBC meetings. Sastric Advisory Council to GBC has reported that there is a desire for control of who is ISKCON guru, the present system does not provide effective safeguards and at the same time contradicts the truly humble attitude of the Vaishnavas and is in danger of gradual corruption.

== Background ==
In 1977 eleven prominent leaders were left to become an initiating gurus in ISKCON. Since founder's death the number of ISKCON devotees accepting disciples has increased. Recently, some of grand-disciples (disciples of disciples) have begun to accept disciples in the next generation. Prabhupada is officially considered a Founder/Acharya, and is assumed to be "pre-eminent" guru of all devotees in his society.

According to the theological epistemology of the tradition, scriptural or Vedic knowledge is the only way to achieve the knowledge of the out-worldly or transcendental realm. However the notable exception to this rule is what is called vaidushya-pratyaksa, or the faultless and pure perception of a pure realised soul, which forms the foundation of scripture itself.

There are few female gurus in Gaudiya Vaishnavism. In 2009, ISKCON began procedures to recognise female gurus.

In a typical initiation ceremony as a guru of International Society for Krishna Consciousness he would begin with purification using achamana (holy water) and concludes with a sermon on the importance of chanting of the holy names in the life of new initiate.

== History ==
=== Direct initiations ===
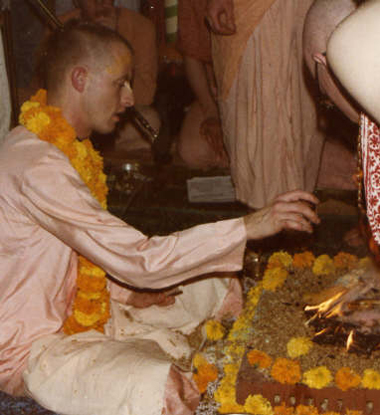
Satsvarupa das Goswami during ISKCON diksa ceremony in 1979.

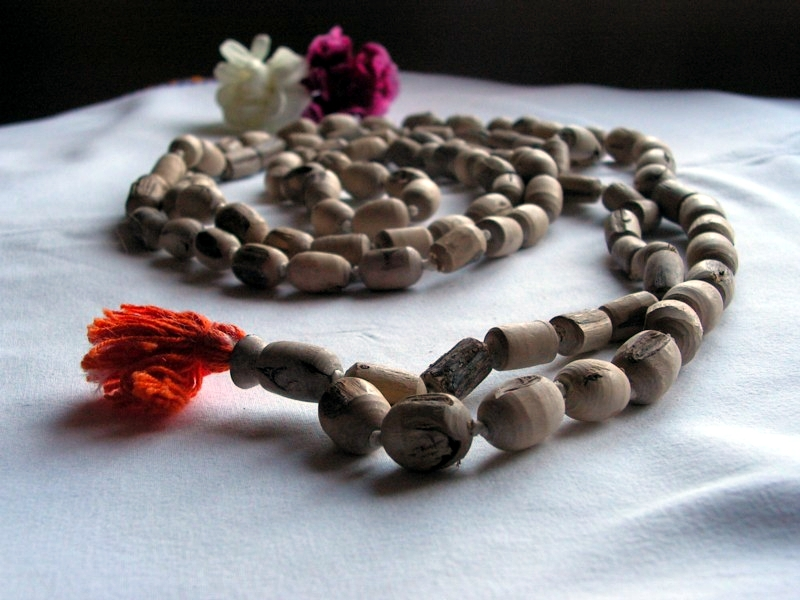
Chanting beads, normally of tulasi wood given by an ISKCON guru at the initiation to an ISKCON devotee of Krishna.

The history of initiations in ISKCON is started with the foundation of the society in 1966 and develops through a number of periods from the initial date to present times. During the first initiations in September 1966 disciples were given names, asked to remain strictly vegetarian and asked to chant 25 rounds of japa. Soon additional requirements followed, but the number of prescribed rounds of Hare Krishna japa was reduced to the minimum 16.

At my initiation, Prabhupāda told me to chant twenty-five rounds, but shortly afterwards he reduced the number to sixteen. After my initiation I faithfully executed Prabhupāda's order to chant sixteen rounds a day.

— Satsvarupa Dasa Goswami.

Some devotees shaved their heads after the first initiation. First second initiation was in Boston, 9 May 1968 where only male devotees were initiated. However next day saw a number of women initiated too.

From the period of the first initiation in 1966 until early 1970 Srila Prabhupada would organize all initiations personally. At this stage Hare Krishna movement was rather small in numbers and most of the devotees were located in the United States.

=== Early deviations ===
At a festival at New Vrindaban, West Virginia, on Janmastami day 1970, four recently initiated sannyasis, Brahmananda, Gargamuni, Subala and Visnujana, were preaching that "Prabhupada is God." All four were temporarily banned from preaching within ISKCON'.

=== Proxy initiations ===
Starting from 1971 Prabhupada would start delegating the function of chanting of beads and doing yajna to his disciples. He would often initiate by mail and every temple president had a cassette of Prabhupada chanting the Pancharatrika gayatri mantra which was played in the ear of the new second initiate and that was as good as hearing the Agamic gayatri mantra from Srila Prabhupada himself. From the beginning of January 1973 Revatinandana and Kirtanananda were instructed also to chant on the beads of new initiates while Prabhupada would continue to deal with the "matter of brahmana initiations", however sometimes the mantra was given personally by disciples too.

=== Initiations in 1977 ===
In 1977 that was also changed by Prabhupada, and even the function of the second initiation was delegated to a few selected disciples. In the middle of May 1977, while in Hrishikesh, his health had turned for the worse and Prabhupada called all his GBC members to Vrindavana for instruction. The discussion of 28 May was recorded. There was a backlog of candidates and on 9 July a letter by his secretary, Tamal Krishna Goswami, was sent out, and that named eleven senior disciples who would now be responsible for giving initiations to the new candidates. At this point the new candidates need no longer write to him and the recommendations don’t have to come to him for confirmation.

=== After death ===
A number of scholars have documented the struggle for authority created by Prabhupada's departure. Two supporters of ISKCON, Shriman Narayan, the former Governor of Gujarat and a prominent industrialist Ram Krishna Bajaj raised issues of the appointment of a single successor from among his followers. Prabhupada answered that all his disciples would succeed him.

==== Period of no initiations ====
The period from the date of death until the March 1978 annual meeting saw no initiations in ISKCON outside of Kirtanananda Swami's zone. Annual meeting of Governing commission of ISKCON was scheduled before Gaura Purnima festival in March and Prabhupada long established that the GBC are his "direct representatives to act as the instrument for the execution of the will of His Divine Grace".

==== Early Zonal acharyas period ====
From 1978 until 1982, only eleven devotees were allowed to initiate new disciples and give brahmana (or second) initiation to existing ISKCON devotees, who became known as Prabhupada's disciples despite receiving sampradaya mantra from new ISKCON gurus. There was noticeable difference between these newly appointed ISKCON gurus and Prabhupada. The new ISKCON gurus, known as Zonal acharyas, were all young and immature, Kirtanananda Swami was the eldest at 40—many were still in their twenties—and some had only been devotees for five years at the time of their appointment. Yet they had not only become the movement's elders, they were catapulted to an absolute status. Beginning in 1980, less than three years after Prabhupada's death, guru controversies arose in rapid succession. In general, ISKCON was led by young men who, until the formation of the first schisms, wielded much power despite their lack of maturity. In the words of one GBC member: "In Prabhupada's time the only problem was that there was only one real adult in the movement."

==== Mid Zonal acharyas period ====
In 1982, a few new gurus were added to the list, including Gopala Krishna Goswami and Bhaktisvarupa Damodar Swami. All gurus at this stage were assigned honorific names, such as Srila Gurudeva, Srila Vishnupada, Srila Gurupada, Srila Acharyadeva, Srila Bhagavatpada, Srila Bhaktipada etc., they also accepted daily worship on a Vyasasana, the throne was allocated to each person, but a collective Vyasasanas were specially constructed for gatherings. When one of the eleven gurus, Jayatirtha, left for the Gaudiya Math by waking out the Mayapur campus towards Swami Bhakti Rakshak Sridhar, the latter tried to mediate between the GBC and Jayatirtha, who recently took sannyasa, but that increased tensions with Gaudiya Math and Sridhara Swami's followers serving in ISKCON. That year, 1982, GBC expelled Jayatirtha from ISKCON and a sub-committee was sent in the middle of the meetings to his GBC zone to prevent the crisis. His disciples had locked themselves in a separate building near Bhaktivedanta Manor and would not engage in negotiations. Later a separate committee was formed to appoint new ISKCON gurus for his zone. During this period at least one of the eleven gurus had suggested lowering the worship received, but this motion was not passed.

==== Zonal Guru reform ====
A number of devotees, all directly initiated by Prabhupada, were observing that many controlling positions were being lost to disciples of new gurus. Additionally, one of the gurus was conditionally suspended during the August 1985 GBC meetings at New Vrindaban for sexual misconduct. An informal group headed by Ravindra Svarupa Dasa and others was formed in 1984 to investigate and gather information about possible deviations in different regions.

This campaign resulted in Temple Presidents meeting in New Vrindavana, September 1985, headed by Bahudaka Das, the President of the North American Temple Presidents, Ravindra Svarupa Dasa, Vice President and Krishna Gopal Das, the Secretary. The group issued a threat of a no confidence vote towards the Governing Body Commission and demand that all power to be returned to direct disciples of Prabhupada.

By late 1986, a number of senior GBCs, including Tamal Krishna Goswami and Satsvarupa Das Goswami, became active supporters of the reform. However, in November 1985 European management assembly had issued a protest against the demands of the North American temple presidents and issued a joint statement. The reformers aimed at removing dedicated vyasasanas from the temple space, stopping daily guru puja ceremonies for new gurus and reforming use of honorifics among others, reserving use of His Divine Grace,-pada and -deva honorifics only towards Prabhupada himself. A demand to include new GBCs and new ISKCON gurus was issued and 1986 saw both resignations of a number of Zonal gurus and increased number of new gurus and GBCs.

The end of 1985 also saw an attack on most senior ISKCON guru, Kirtanananda Swami, who refused to accept lowering of the worship and insisted that he should retain the title of Founder/acharya of New Vrindavana. Following this conflict between this largest ISKCON community and the reformers New Vrindavana was officially expelled from ISKCON in 1988, all reformers shortly became new ISKCON gurus and many of them were elected as the new GBC. (Bozeman. 2000)

=== Gaudiya Math leaders ===
Many deviations or guru related schisms are centered on charismatic individual leadership. After the pre-1977 departure of Siddhaswarupa, a number of ISKCON devotees started following variety of Gaudiya Math gurus, all of whom were individual leaders of separate parallel institutions. One of the leaders of the schismatic groups was Bhaktivedanta Narayana Maharaja. While Narayana Maharaja's large following was restricted to non-ISKCON Indians prior to 1991, with an exception of a few ISKCON Vrindavana residents, nearly all of his post-1991 Western followers were previously ISKCON members, and since the majority of his Western followers have left ISKCON in 1995 after the GBC action, these followers have turned to ISKCON for fresh recruits escalating the conflict. Following many years of apparent confrontation in April 2010 ISKCON's Governing Body Commission has released a forty-page document that clarifies the relationship between Srila Prabhupada and Narayana Maharaja. ISKCON news's description of the document said:

"The document follows up a meeting between Narayana Maharaja and several senior members of the GBC in October 2009 at the sacred town of Govardhana, India. During the meeting, ISKCON leaders apologized to Narayana Maharaja for their failure to communicate with him in a proper and timely manner in 1995, regarding policies they had just established concerning members of ISKCON taking instruction from other gurus outside of their society.

In our Govardhan meeting last October we expressed our respect to Narayana Maharaja as a senior Vaisnava. We offered him our heartfelt apologies for our failure to communicate with him properly. He graciously accepted our apologies. He then requested the GBC to rescind the policies established in 1995, particularly in regard to himself.

While the GBC desires to show all courtesy due Narayana Maharaja and his followers, it is not able to grant Narayana Maharaja this request. The GBC remains firmly convinced that Narayana Maharaja persistently misrepresents Srila Prabhupada by claiming that Prabhupäda, on his last day, entrusted in Narayana Maharaja special directions to assume a unique, ongoing role in the spiritual leadership of ISKCON."

=== The Ritvik Idea ===
As news of ISKCON gurus’ misdeeds spread in the late 1980s, some ISKCON members as ISKCON Revival Movement began to question the validity of Prabhupada's having appointed members to the role of the spiritual master. Because no disciple can be equal to or more than Jagadguru Srila Prabhupada a Mahabhagavata Acharya in Gaudiya Vaishnava Parampara. So in Parampara system only Five prominent Acharyas are considered and worshiped (A C Bhaktivedanta Swami, Bhaktisiddhanta Saraswati, Goura Kishora Das Babaji, Bhaktivinoda Thakur, Jagannatha Das Babaji). Members in early 1990s attempted to prove that there was no need for any new gurus; rather, Prabhupada's disciples could initiate newcomers on Prabhupada's behalf as proxies for Prabhupada (the Sanskrit word ऋत्विक् ritwik or ritvik means "officiating priest").

=== A. C. Bhaktivedānta Swāmi Prabhupāda as Shiksha-Guru ===
As early as 1988, some followers of Srila Prabhupāda, such as The Vaishnava Foundation co-founded by Kailāsa Candra dāsa, had rejected claims that Srila Prabhupāda ever officially ordered anyone to become a Diksha-Guru. This orthodox stream holds that the diksha initiation process implemented within “ISKCON”, in Gaudiya Math and by “Ritvik” leaders all deviate from the teachings of the sastras, as well as the guru-vani of the Madhva-Gaudiya Sampradya. They encourage pure devotees to shun affiliation with such entities. New devotees, according to this view, are to submit to Srila Prabhupāda as their Shiksha-Guru, faithfully follow the rules and regulations of the scriptures, and patiently await the appearance of a qualified diksha-guru Acharya.

== See also ==
- Gaudiya Vaishnavism
- Bhaktivedanta Book Trust
- List of Hindu gurus and sants
- Oxford Centre for Hindu Studies
- Bhaktivedanta College
- List of International Society for Krishna Consciousness members and patrons

== References and Links ==
- Bozeman, John M. 2000: Field Notes: ISKCON's Extensive Reform Efforts, Nova Religio 3,2: 383-387.
- Brzezinski, January 1996 – 1997: The Parampara Institution in Gaudiya Vaisnavism, Journal of Vaishnava Studies 5,1: 151-182.
- Dasa, Gaura-keshava. 1998: Guru Ashraya. A Report to the GBC on Guru Issues.
- Dasa, Raghupati. 1998: Lokanatha Disciple Hits Back at Report.
- Dasa, Sri Rama. 2001: Proposal to Restructure the ISKCON GBC.
- Shinn, Larry (1987). The dark lord: cult images and the Hare Krishnas in America. Philadelphia: Westminster Press. pp. 44–45. ISBN 0-664-24170-0.
- Ketola, Kimmo (2008). The founder of the Hare Krishnas as seen by devotees: a cognitive study of religious charisma. Brill. pp. 234 pages. ISBN 978-90-04-16613-4.
- Goswami, Tamal Krishna 1997: 'The Perils of Succession Heresies of Authority and Continuity In the Hare Krishna Movement', Cults and Society, Vol. 1, 1, 2001. also in ISKCON Communications Journal 5,1: 13-44.
- GBC Body, ISKCON. 1995: Gurus and Initiation in ISKCON. Law of the International Society for Krishna Consciousness. Mayapura: GBC Press.
- ISKCON Studies Conference, The Guru: Person, Position, Possibilities. Italy. 2009.
- GBC Body, ISKCON. ISKCON GBC Addendum "Clarification of the process." March 1978
- Dasa, Bahudak, Letter to Ravindra Svarup, 4 December. 1984.
- ISKCON Zonal Ministry of Public Affairs, European Assembly Meeting: Guru Reforms, Paris, Nov. 8-10 1985.
- Das, Adi Kesava, Guru Reform paper tabled to GBC Body, 1985.
- Sastric Avisory Committee, Female Diksa Gurus ISKCON position on female diksa gurus.
- Goswami, Satsvarupa dasa. 1996 Guru Reform Notebook. (GN Press)
- Rocheford Jr., E. Burke 1998: "Prabhupada Centennial Survey. Final Report". Submitted to the GBC on 18 November 1998.
