= Visnujana Swami =

Vishnujana Swami (IAST: Viṣṇujana Svāmī; June 2, 1948 - March 16, 1976), born Mark Stephen D'Atillo, was a disciple of A. C. Bhaktivedanta Swami Prabhupada, and a sannyasi within the International Society for Krishna Consciousness (commonly known as the 'Hare Krishnas' or ISKCON). He made recordings of himself singing the Hare Krishna mantra.

== Life ==
He was born as Mark Stephen Datillo on June 2, 1948, in San Jose, California to parents Maureen (née Desmet) (1924-2017) and Joseph D'Attilo (1923-2006). At the age of seventeen, he moved to San Francisco along with his girlfriend, whom he then married. In 1966–1967 Vishnujana first came into contact with the Hare Krishnas, and by 1968 he had received initiation from Srila Prabhupada and became a full-time member of the movement. On July 20, 1970, he was ordained a sannyasi.

== Career ==
Vishnujana played the harmonium and mridanga. Musical recordings of Vishnujana would later be released in 1995

By 1973, he led a group of Hare Krishnas, the Radha-Damodara Traveling Sankirtan Party (named after the particular murtis (deities) carried on the bus), in a proselytizing bus trip across the USA.

In March 16, 1976, during the Gaura Purnima festival in India, Vishnujana Swami died.

In 1999, a biography of Vishnujana Swami entitled Radha-Damodara Vilasa was published by Vaiyasaki das Adhikari.

== Discography ==
| Year | Title | Label |
|---|---|---|
| 1995 | Vishnujana Swami - Bhajans | Bhaktivedanta Book Trust |
| 1995 | Vishnujana Swami - Kirtans | Bhaktivedanta Book Trust |
| 2005 | Vishnujana Swami Vintage-Recording | SecretJeevas |

== Sources ==
- Broo, Måns (2003), As good as God: the guru in Gauḍīya Vaiṣṇavism, Åbo Akademi University Press, ISBN 951-765-132-5
- Tamal Krishna Goswami (1984), Servant of the Servant, Bhaktivedanta Book Trust
- Vaiyasaki Dasa (1999), Radha-Damodara Vilasa: The Inner Life of Vishnujana Swami and Jayananda Prabhu. Volume 1 1967-1972, Srvanam-Kirtanam Press, ISBN 0-9655784-3-7
- Lokanātha Swami (2001), Festivals: Śrīla Prabhupāda at the Māyāpur-Vr̥ndāvana festivals, Padayātrā Press, ISBN 81-901132-1-6
- Riddha Dāsa (1997), Destination South Africa: the birth of the Hare Krishna movement in South Africa, 1972-1975, Visnu Garuda Books, ISBN 1-901593-00-2
- Satsvarupa Dasa Goswami (1998), You Cannot Leave Boston: My Letters from Srila Prabhupada, GN Press, ISBN 0-911233-71-7
- Satsvarūpa Dāsa Gosvāmī (1981), Śrīla Prabhupāda-līlāmṛta: a biography of His Divine Grace A. C. Bhaktivedanta Swami Prabhupāda. Vol. 3, Only He Could Lead Them: San Francisco/India 1967, Bhaktivedanta Book Trust, ISBN 0-89213-110-1
- Satsvarūpa Dāsa Gosvāmī (1982), Śrīla Prabhupāda-līlāmṛta: a biography of His Divine Grace A. C. Bhaktivedanta Swami Prabhupāda. Vol. 4, In Every Town and Village: Around the World 1968-1971, Bhaktivedanta Book Trust, ISBN 0-89213-115-2
- Satsvarūpa Dāsa Gosvāmī (1983), Srīla Prabhupāda-līlāmṛta: a biography of His Divine Grace A. C. Bhaktivedanta Swami Prabhupāda. Vol. 5, Let There Be a Temple: India/Around the World 1971-1975, Bhaktivedanta Book Trust, ISBN 0-89213-119-5
- Satsvarūpa Dāsa Gosvāmī (1983), Srīla Prabhupāda-līlāmṛta: a biography of His Divine Grace A. C. Bhaktivedanta Swami Prabhupāda. Vol. 6, Uniting Two Worlds: Around the World / Return to Vrindavana 1975-1977, Bhaktivedanta Book Trust, ISBN 0-89213-106-3
- Satsvarupa Dasa Goswami (1984), Your ever well-wisher, Bhaktivedanta Book Trust, ISBN 0-89213-133-0
- West Publishing Co. (1991), "Northeastern reporter. Second series", Northeastern Reporter, 571
- Gauridasa Pandit Dasa (June 6, 1999), "Visnujana Swami's Birthday", Vaishnava News Network, archived from the original on November 6, 2008
