= Ranchor Prime =

British scholar of ecology and Hinduism

Ranchor Prime is a British author, researcher on Hindu environmental issues, and a Hindu religious scholar. He has written books on Hinduism and ecology. He is a disciple of A. C. Bhaktivedanta Swami Prabhupada. Prime has translated the Bhagavad Gita into English. It was published with illustrations by B. G. Sharma as The Illustrated Bhagavad Gita: A New Translation with Commentary.

Prime is an advisor on religion and conservation to the Alliance of Religions and Conservation, and he is co-founder and director of Friends of Vrindavan, an environmental charity active in Britain and India. He is also a member of the International Consultancy on Religion, Education and Culture (ICOREC).

== Biography ==
=== Early years ===
Ranchor was born as Richard Prime in the 1950s in Leeds. He was brought up within the Roman Catholic tradition. From a very early age he was "saturated with Catholic devotion". He lived in a cathedral, lived with Benedictine monks and was a choirboy.

While studying at Chelsea College of Art and Design, he "very quickly lost faith in the materialistic sort of life". He started to look for something deep and spiritual, and along with his friends used LSD and other drugs. At the same time, he became interested in the "mystic East", which provided "a tremendous spiritual tradition but one that was different to the West".

In the 1970s he joined ISKCON, popularly known as the Hare Krishna movement. Richard came in contact with Hare Krishna mantra through the musical Hair, that had then just arrived in London. One of the centerpieces of the musical was the whole cast dancing on stage and singing Hare Krishna. Later, Richard's sister bought the record, which caught his imagination. After that, he and his friends used to sing Hare Krishna "without really knowing what it was about". Around the same time, A. C. Bhaktivedanta Swami Prabhupada had sent six of his very early disciples from America to London. Later, they recorded Hare Krishna mantra with The Beatles on the Radha Krishna Temple album. In radio interviev with Alex Chadwick Ranchor Prime recalls: "I saw the devotees once or twice, the Hare Krishna devotees, singing on Kings Road in Chelsea. A friend of mine said, "Why don't you come along, they're really nice people." I met them, and it was one of those moments in life when I knew that I belonged here with these people". Richard recalls, that it took him about three days to become a Hare Krishna monk.

I just knew this is where I belonged. I was ready to just drop everything, but out of consideration for other people, I went to have a long discussion with the principal of the art college, who told me it was a very bad idea. And I respectfully listened to him and said, "Well, I'm sorry but I must do this." And then my father suggested that I talk this over with the Benedictine monks. So I went on his request and stayed for a week in a Benedictine monastery not far from London [...] I had a wonderful time staying with the Benedictines, this is the Abbey in Sussex, while they were saying their morning rosary, I was chanting Krishna on my beads and I took long walks with most monks in the community, and talked over my decision and told them that I really feel that God is calling me to do this. At end of a week, the Abbot of the monastery heard that I was planning to go back to the temple, to join the Krishna temple, so he asked to see me. I went to see him and he said that "some of the monks, a few of them have come to me and suggested that Richard is going to join Krishna temple, we would like to have prayer vigil through the night to pray for his soul because, we're worried." And the Abbot said, "I told them, there's no need to worry, because he's doing the right thing," and he told me, "If I was your age, I'd do the same." So I never felt any conflict at all between, because ultimately the important thing Jesus Christ was teaching us was to love God - by loving God you can love one another, and that's exactly the same that Krishna teaches. There's no need to be any conflict whatsoever, in my mind.

He was initiated by ISKCON's founder A. C. Bhaktivedanta Swami Prabhupada and received name Ranchora Dasa, which means "servant of Krishna". Ranchor means, in Krishna's case, "a person not willing to fight on this one occasion." On one celebrated occasion, Krishna did not want to fight and left the battlefield without fighting, so he's called Ranchor.

=== Environmental work in India ===
In 1975 Ranchor Prime came to India for the first time, where he got "quite a lot of culture shock". He got very sick and depressed, finding it "a difficult place to handle". During his first visit to India, he made a pilgrimage to the holy city of Vrindavan, the birthplace of Krishna. "It was quite basic. We didn't have a lot of facilities in those days for Western visitors to India. It was a new idea really, for western pilgrims to come. Some hippies had come, but not really pilgrims in that way. But I persevered, and when I got back to the West it took a couple of years to digest, I think, the experience of Vrindavan".

Over the years, he came to Vrindavan from time to time until fifteen years later he became deeply involved in environmental work there. Partly, it was because he saw "the divine homeland of Krishna being so dilapidated". At the same time, back in England he started working professionally with environmentalists, particularly with World Wildlife Fund on education programs working with religious networks all over the world of different faiths, how to draw on their own traditional teachings about nature. According to Ranchor Prime "All religions contain powerful traditions and teachings about how to live in this world in a way that is sympathetic to nature because it is part of God's creation. Every religious tradition has that..."

Once he started getting involved in that, he began to think more deeply about the Krishna tradition's relationship with nature. As a result, he embarked on writing a book on Hinduism and ecology, and that brought him to Vrindavan "with a completely fresh pair of eyes". "Instead of just thinking, well, this must be the way it is and there's nothing I can do, I began thinking, well, why has it become dilapidated, why is it not being looked after, and what could possibly change things? And I looked for people to talk to, people who lived here, had lived here all their lives, who perhaps may have also been thinking in that way".

Ranchor Prime approached the World Wide Fund for Nature in Geneva and proposed to them a three-year project based in Vrindavan that would try to draw out the lessons which Hinduism had to teach about ecology, and try to apply them, in a way to have "a positive effect on all the millions of pilgrims who come to Vrindavan so they could take away some positive lessons with them - and also then provide a model project that could be applied elsewhere".

It was not easy to make World Wildlife Fund agree to finance the project. Since it is an environmental organization, it does not support religious projects. World Wildlife Fund had to be persuaded that "this was not essentially a religious project, but this was a project about caring for nature". Finally the WWF agreed to fund the project. In funding Ranchor's project, WWF "saw the opportunity to highlight the ecological values of the cultures and religious traditions where the projects are funded". Funding was granted for three years, to run from 1991 through 1994, some $40,000 per year.

Being familiar with the environmental situation in Vrindavan, Ranchor Prime took part in "a major effort" to reforest the area of Vrindavan. He conceived a plan with Sevak Sharan, a longtime resident of the area, to plant trees along the eleven-kilometer parikrama path that encircles the holy town. The importance of the parikrama path is indicated by the fact that it is traveled by over two million pilgrims per year. In succeeding months, ISKCON donated the use of one and a half acres beside the pilgrimage path for a nursery to plant and raise 10,000 trees of local origin. The project was formally initiated on 21 November 1991, the festival day of Vrinda Devi, the goddess representing the local flora and regarded as a queen of Vrindavan. All present at the ceremony took the following pledge:

The forest of Vrindavan is the sacred playground of Radha and Krishna. However, we, the people of this region, have cut its trees, polluted its Yamuna river, and spoilt its dust with our rubbish and sewage. I pledge that from now on I will do all within my power to protect Vrindavan from further destruction and to restore it to its original beauty.

The first stage of the project was to encourage community involvement so that the planted trees would be protected and would survive. Some two thousand trees and shrubs were planted along a two kilometer segment of the parikrama path. Stage two included further planting along the entire pathway, and continued outreach efforts to involve local population. Several environmental problem have been dealt with along the way.

After the funding came to an end, Ranchor started his own charity to continue the work, which is called Friends of Vrindavan. Presently, it is engaged in raising money in the West to continue supporting work in India. Ranchor Prime:

I didn't think it was going to be simple, and it's going to take perhaps a generation, two generations really to turn the tide I think, but I do believe it will be turned. It's not just us, there are many people now taking up this work, and as the burden, the stress which is largely because of increasing population - in the last 50 years the population of India has tripled, probably the population of Vrindavan has multiplied by more than that - so that creates huge pressures, and it's going to take a long time to change those, but as the pressure increases so does the urgency to find a solution.

== Selected bibliography ==
Books

- Prime, Ranchor; O'Brien, Joanne; Palmer, Martin (1992), A Wealth of Faiths: Economics and Religion, World Wide Fund for Nature UK, ISBN 0-947613-85-4
- Prime, Ranchor (1997), Ramayana: A Journey, Welcome Rain, ISBN 1-55670-801-7
- Prime, Ranchor; Mbitu, Ngangar (1997), Essential African Mythology: Stories That Change the World, Thorsons, ISBN 1-932771-02-6
- Prime, Ranchor (2002), Vedic Ecology: Practical Wisdom for Surviving the 21st Century (illustrated ed.), Springer Science+Business Media, ISBN 1-886069-65-4
- Prime, Ranchor (2002), Prince of Dharma: The Illustrated Life of Buddha (illustrated by B. G. Sharma ed.), Mandala Publishing, ISBN 1-886069-81-6
- Prime, Ranchor (2003), The Illustrated Bhagavad Gita: A New Translation With Commentary, Barron's Educational Series, ISBN 0-7641-2223-1
- Prime, Ranchor (2003), Hinduism (illustrated ed.), Chrysalis Education, ISBN 1-59389-126-1
- Prime, Ranchor (2003), Hinduism and Ecology: Seeds of Truth, Motilal Banarsidass, ISBN 81-208-1249-2
- Prime, Ranchor (2004), Ramayana: A Tale of Gods and Demons (illustrated by B. G. Sharma ed.), Springer Science+Business Media, ISBN 1-932771-02-6
- Prime, Ranchor (2006), Mahavira: Prince of Peace (illustrated by B. G. Sharma ed.), Mandala Publishing, ISBN 1-932771-27-1
- Prime, Ranchor (2009), When the Sun Shines, Bhaktivedanta Book Trust, ISBN 978-1-84599-070-1
- Prime, Ranchor (2009), Cows and the Earth, Fitzrovia Press, ISBN 978-0-9561846-9-6
- Prime, Ranchor (2010), Bhagavad Gita: Talks Between the Soul and God, Fitzrovia Press, ISBN 978-0-9561846-4-1
- Prime, Ranchor (2012), Birth of Kirtan, Mandala Publishing, ISBN 978-1-60887-107-0
- Prime, Ranchor (2017), The Eight Elements, Fitzrovia Press, ISBN 978-0-9570722-1-3

Articles

- Ranchor Dasa (1994), "A League of Devotees: My Search for Universal Religion", ISKCON Communications Journal, 1 (2), archived from the original on 18 March 2006
