= Graham Schweig =

American scholar of comparative theology

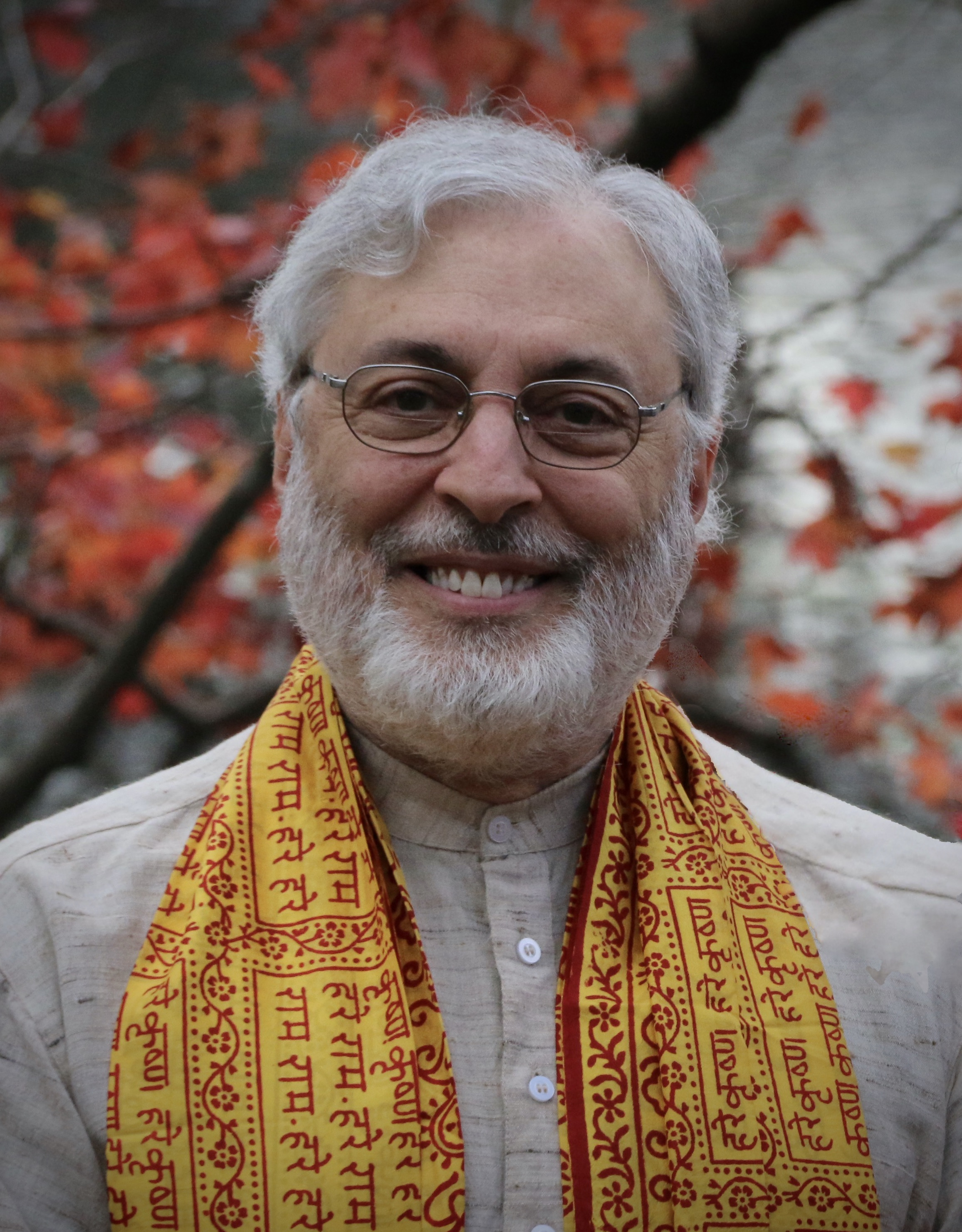
Graham M. Schweig, PhD

Graham M. Schweig is an American scholar of comparative theology of religion, philosophy, and the history of Yoga and Bhakti. He was born in Manhattan, New York and raised in Washington, DC. He joined the faculty at Christopher Newport University in Virginia, in August, 2000, and is currently Professor of Religion and Director of Studies in Religion there. He is also Distinguished Teaching and Research Faculty at The Center for Dharma Studies at the Graduate Theological Union in Berkeley, California, beginning June, 2017.

Schweig first attended the Peabody Institute of the Johns Hopkins University for three years, but went on and earned his B.A. in Religion and Interdisciplinary Studies from American University. He then earned an M.A. in South Asian Studies from the University of Chicago. And eventually, an M.T.S. (Master of Theological Studies) and a Th.M. (Master of Theology) from Harvard University, as well as his doctorate in Comparative Religion from Harvard University. He was also a resident fellow of the Center for the Study of World Religions at Harvard.

Schweig has held teaching positions at Duke University and was also a Visiting Associate Professor of Sanskrit at the University of Virginia while teaching at Christopher Newport University. Since 2007, Schweig has presented over three dozen invited lectures in his field at the Smithsonian Institution in Washington, DC. Schweig is an "experienced registered yoga teacher" at the 500 hour level (ERYT-500) as well as "Yoga Alliance Continuing Education Provider" (YACEP) with Yoga Alliance, and he has held numerous teacher training workshops in the areas of yoga philosophy, history of yoga, Sanskrit for yoga teachers, and advanced trainings in meditation for teachers of yoga.

Schweig has over one hundred publications, such as journal articles, encyclopedia articles, reviews, book chapters, along with several books in the field. Among his books are, DANCE OF DIVINE LOVE: India's Classic Sacred Love Story: The Rasa Lila of Krishna, which was published in 2005 by Princeton University Press, BHAGAVAD GĪTĀ: The Beloved Lord's Secret Love Song, which was published in 2010 by HarperOne / HarperCollinsPublishers, BHAGAVAD GĪTĀ CONCORDANCE: A Comprehensive Word Reference with English and Sanskrit Indexes, published in 2024 by Columbia University Press.

== Select Bibliography ==
- Graham M. Schweig, Bhagavad Gītā: The Beloved Lord's Secret Love Song. — 1st ed. — San Francisco: Harper One / Harper Collins Publishers, 2007. — 368 p. — ISBN 0-06-075425-7
- Graham M. Schweig, Bhagavad Gītā Concordance: A Comprehensive Word Reference with English and Sanskrit Indexes – New York: Columbia University Press, 2024 – ISBN 978-0-231-14132-1
- Graham M. Schweig, Dance of Divine Love: the Rāsa Līlā of Krishna from the Bhāgavata Purāṇa, India's Classic Sacred Love Story / introduced, translated and illuminated by Graham M. Schweig. — 1st ed. — Princeton, NJ: Princeton University Press, 2005. — xxiii, 390 p. — ISBN 0-691-11446-3
- Graham M. Schweig Dance of Divine Love: The Rāsa Līlā of Krishna from the Bhāgavata Purāṇa. India's Classic Sacred Love Story. — 2nd ed. — Motilal Banarsidass Publishers, 2007. — xxiii, 390 p. — ISBN 81-208-3140-3
- Graham M. Schweig, et al. Asceticism, Identity, and Pedagogy in Dharma Traditions. — illustrated. — Deepak Heritage Books, 2006. — xxix, 189 p. — (Indic Heritage Series. Contemporary Issues in Constructive Dharma Vol. 3). — ISBN 0-937194-50-6
- Graham M. Schweig, Posthumous Editing of a Great Master's Work: Special Focus on the Writings of A. C. Bhaktivedanta Swami Prabhupāda – Lanham, Md: Lexington Books, An Imprint of Rowman & Littlefield, 2024 – ISBN 978-1-66693-947-7.
- Graham M. Schweig Synthesis and Divinity: Shri Chaitanya's Philosophy of Achintya-bhed-abheda-Tattva // T. D. Singh & Ravi V. Gomatam Synthesis of Science and Religion: Critical Essays and Dialogues. — San Francisco: Bhaktivedanta Institute, 1987. — pp. 420–429. — ISBN 0-941525-01-5.
- Graham M. Schweig Sparks from God: A Phenomenological Sketch of Symbol // Joseph H. Smith & Susan A. Handelman Psychoanalysis and Religion (Volume 11 of Psychiatry and the Humanities). — Johns Hopkins University Press, 1990. — pp. 174-. — ISBN 0-8018-3895-9.
- Graham M. Schweig Viśvanātha's Gurvaṣṭakam and the Understanding of Guru in Chaitanyaite Vaishnavism // Journal of Vaishnava Studies. — Nyack, NY: A Deepak Publishing, 2003. — Vol. 12. — No. 1. — pp. 113–126.
- Graham M. Schweig Bhajan // Peter J. Claus, Sarah Diamond & Margaret Ann Mills South Asian Folklore: An Encyclopedia: Afghanistan, Bangladesh, India, Nepal, Pakistan, Sri Lanka. — Taylor & Francis, 2003. — pp. 58–59. — ISBN 0-415-93919-4.
- Graham M. Schweig Krishna, the Intimate Deity // Edwin Bryant and Maria Ekstrand The Hare Krishna Movement: The Post-Charismatic Fate of a Religious Transplant. — New York: Columbia University Press, 2004. — pp. 13–30. — ISBN 0-231-12256-X.
- Graham M. Schweig Gangamata Goswamini (18th cent. CE): Hindu Vaishnava ruler, renunciant // Phyllis G. Jestice Holy People of the World: A Cross-Cultural Encyclopedia, Volume 3. — ABC-CLIO, 2004. — pp. 292. — ISBN 1-57607-355-6.
- Graham M. Schweig Gopi/The Gopis: Legendary Hindu devotees // Phyllis G. Jestice Holy People of the World: A Cross-Cultural Encyclopedia, Volume 3. — ABC-CLIO, 2004. — pp. 316–317. — ISBN 1-57607-355-6.
- Graham M. Schweig Dying the Good Death: The Transfigurative Power of Bhakti // Anna S. King & J. L. Brockington The Intimate Other: Love Divine in Indic Religions. — Orient Blackswan, 2005. — pp. 369–408. — ISBN 81-250-2801-3.
- Graham M. Schweig The Divine Feminine in the Theology of Krishna // Edwin F. Bryant Krishna: A Sourcebook. — Oxford; New York: Oxford University Press, 2007. — pp. 441–474. — ISBN 0-19-514891-6.
- Graham M. Schweig Bhagavad Gita // Yudit K. Greenberg Encyclopedia of Love in World Religions, Volume 1. — ABC-CLIO, 2008. — pp. 76–79. — ISBN 1-85109-980-8.
- Graham M. Schweig Gita Govinda // Yudit K. Greenberg Encyclopedia of Love in World Religions, Volume 1. — ABC-CLIO, 2008. — pp. 247–249. — ISBN 1-85109-980-8.
- Graham M. Schweig Prema // Yudit K. Greenberg Encyclopedia of Love in World Religions, Volume 1. — ABC-CLIO, 2008. — pp. 478–479. — ISBN 1-85109-980-8.
