= Gaura Purnima =

Hindu observance

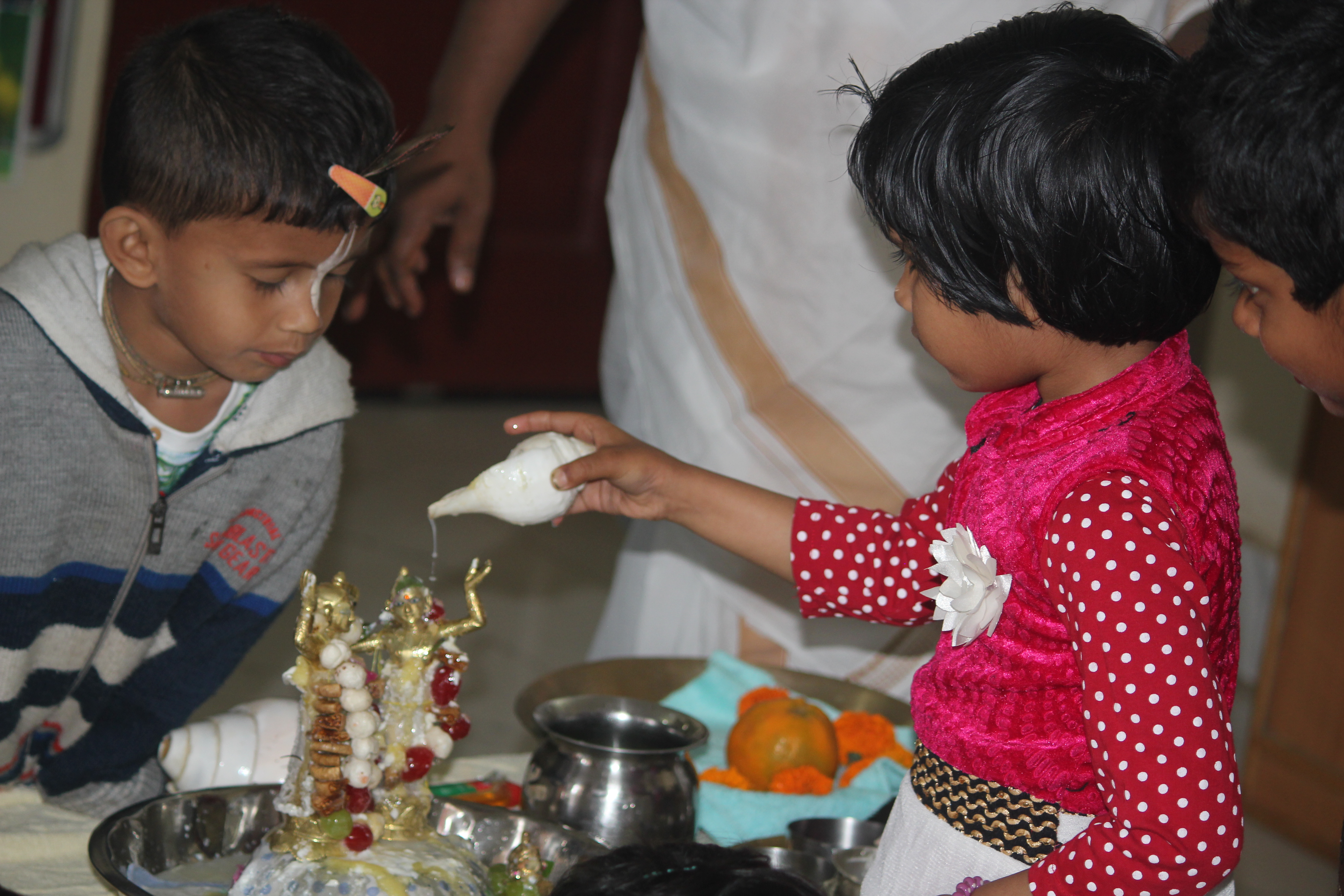
- Gaura Purnima Abhishekam at ISKCON temple
- Observed by: Gaudiya Vaishnavism followers especially ISKCON, Bengali Hindus
- Type: Hinduism, ISKCON
- Significance: Birth of Chaitanya Mahaprabhu
- Observances: Fasting, Kirtan
- Date: Variable, determined by the Hindu calendar
- 2025 date: March 14
- 2026 date: March 3
- 2027 date: March 22
- Related to: Krishna Janmastami

Gaura Purnima is a Vaishnava festival that celebrates the birth of Chaitanya Mahaprabhu (1486–1534), who founded Gaudiya Vaishnavism and is consideredas an incarnation of Krishna. It occurs on the purnima (full moon day) in the Hindu month Phalguna, usually falling in March or April. It was celebrated on March 3 on 2025.

The day holds great significance for followers of ISKCON (International Society for Krishna Consciousness). In ISKCON temples, the celebrations include kirtan and the abhishek of Mahaprabhu (performed with a variety of fruit juices, flowers, panchamritam, and panchagavyam), along with discourses on the life and teachings of Chaitanya Mahaprabhu. The rituals also feature Maha Aarti, the offering of Chhappan Bhog (consisting of 56 varieties of food items), and the distribution of Mahaprasad to devotees.

== See also ==
- Chaitanya Mahaprabhu
- ISKCON
- Gaudiya Vaishnavism
- Nabadwip
- Festivals of West Bengal
