= Diksha =

Practice in Hinduism

Initiation (dīkṣā) of a sacrificer (yajamāna) in a Vedic Soma-yajña

Diksha (Sanskrit: दीक्षा, IAST: dīkṣā) also spelled diksa, deeksha or deeksa in common usage, translated as "preparation or consecration for a religious ceremony", is giving of a mantra or an initiation by the guru (in Guru–shishya tradition) of Indian religions such as Hinduism, Buddhism, and Jainism. Diksha is given in a one-to-one ceremony, and typically includes undertaking a serious spiritual discipline.

Dīkṣā can be of various types, through the teacher's sight, touch, or word, with the purpose of purifying the disciple or student. Initiation by touch is called sparśa dīkṣā. The bestowing of divine grace through diksa is sometimes called śaktipāta. Another type of dīkṣā, into a monastic order, involves a vow of celibacy, the renunciation of personal possessions, and the abandonment of worldly duties, including family ties. Dīkṣā has the same meaning in Jainism. Dīkṣā is also called Charitra or Mahanibhiskraman in Jainism.

In Hinduism, initiation takes the form of one of several rituals, depending on the individual and the tradition involved.

Vishnu Yamala (tantra) says: "The process that bestows divya jñānaṃ (transcendental, spiritual knowledge) and destroys sin (pāpa), the seed of sin and ignorance, is called dīkṣā by the spiritual persons who have seen the Truth (desikais tattva-kovidaih)."

== Etymology ==
The word dīkṣā is derived from the Sanskrit root dā ("to give") plus kṣi ("to destroy") or alternately from the verb root dīkṣ ("to consecrate").

== Initiation in Hindu Traditions ==
In Hindu traditions, dikṣā refers to the formal ritual of initiation whereby a disciple (śisya) is admitted into a specific religious tradition, lineage (paramparā), or monastic order (sampradāya) by a spiritual preceptor(guru) or consecrated master (ācārya). Through dikṣā, a guru initiates a disciple into an unbroken chain of spiritual transmission known as paramparā, which traces its lineage back to a founding master or directly to the deity. On initiation the disciple undertakes to abide by the values and doctrines of the community, is imparted a secret mantra specific to that tradition and may be given a new name.

Unlike life-cycle rites(samskāra) or household duties(dharma), sectarian initiation is supererogatory- an additional, voluntary commitment undertaken specifically for spiritual salvation.Through this the disciple hopes to attain spiritual salvation either during this lifetime or upon death, depending upon which specific tradition he is initiated into.

After initiation, a sampradaya might require celibacy and only include disciples who renounce the world, or it might have a wider social base, accepting householders of both genders and all castes. In initiation into world-renouncing orders, initiates may perform funeral rites (antyesti). The rite indicates that the renunciate is socially 'dead' and is no longer bond by the three worldly goals of life (purusartha): dharma (social duty), artha (wealth) and kama (pleasure). Upon initiation, the renunciate receives a new monastic name, adopts an ascetic dress symbolising celibacy and total dedication to liberation (moksa).

In the Mahabharata, Panchashika is initiated Kapila's kinship structure by being adopted by a woman of the clan.

Some of the devotional traditions in which dikṣā is conferred are Saiva, Shakta and Vaishnava.

== Shaivism ==
In Shaivism, dikṣā (initiation) takes various forms. Cākṣuṣī dīkṣā involves the guru imparting energy through a spiritually charged gaze. Sparṣa dīkṣā is given by placing the right hand on the initiate's head, while Vācikī dīkṣā involves chanting the saṃhitāmantra aloud, preceded by the withdrawal of the guru's senses in meditation. Mānasī dīkṣā is the mental equivalent of Vācikī dīkṣā. Śāstrī dīkṣā occurs during the study of the scriptures. Yoga dīkṣā is bestowed when the disciple realizes Śiva-tattva through yoga. Hautrī dīkṣā is initiation through agnikārya (sacred fire ritual), which, when internal, is called Jñānavatī dīkṣā and when external, is called Kriyāvatī dīkṣā. Kriyāvatī dīkṣā is further divided into sabīja and nirbīja, with nirbīja having subcategories of sadyo nirvāṇada and dehapātānte nirvāṇada, and sabīja into loka dharminī and śiva dharmini, with loka dharminī further divided into nirādhikāra and sādhikāra.

== Tantra ==
Tantra mentions five types of dīkṣā: initiation by a ritual or samaya-diksa; sparsa-diksa is an initiation by touch and is done without a ritual; vag-diksa is done by word or mantra; sambhavi-diksa arises from the perception of external the appearance of the guru; and mano-diksa refers to initiation performed in the mind.

The Bengali saint Anandamayi Ma often gave sparśa dīkṣā (divine touch) or dṛk dīkṣā(through her look), through which she bestowed śaktipāta (divine grace).

== Shakta ==
Dīkṣā for Shaktas is described in various texts such as Śāradātilaka Tantra (chapters 3–5), Prapañcasāra Tantra (chapters 5–6), and Śrītattva-Cintāmaṇi (chapters 2–5). These works describe four types of dīkṣā rituals: Kriyāvatī, Varṇamayī, Kalāvatī, and Vedhamayī.

- Kriyāvatī dīkṣā involves the guru taking the caitanya of the disciple into himself and uniting it with his own, purifying it, and then returning it to the disciple. The guru then offers the pūrṇāhuti and recites the mūlamantra.
- Varṇamayī dīkṣā involves the guru putting the letters (varṇa) into the body of the disciple and withdrawing them from the various parts of the body. The elements of the body dissolve and the disciple then attains a divine body. With the caitanya of the disciple having become one with the Paramatma, the guru transfers the varṇa back into the disciple completing the dīkṣā.
- Kalāvatī dīkṣā involves the guru uniting the five kalā (which are the powers of the bhūta), namely nivṛtti, pratiṣṭhā, vidyā, śānti, and śāntyatīta, with the appropriate parts of the disciple's body.
- Vedhamayī dīkṣā involves the piercing of the mystical lotuses present in different parts of the body. The guru meditates on the deities and transfers different letters of the alphabet to the deity at each stage, uniting that deity with that lotus. This is successively done until Śakti is penetrated into the Paramatma along with the self of the disciple, resulting in the disciple gaining knowledge and becoming Shiva.

=== Ramakrishna Mission ===
The Ramakrishna Mission, originating from Ramakrishna and Swami Vivekananda, gives its initiation through mantra-dīkṣā. The initiate is expected to be knowledgeable about the sect, its practices and its history. To accomplish that, the initiate is made to read four books (namely Sri Ramakrishna – Life and Teachings, Sri Sarada Devi – Life and Teachings, Swami Vivekananda – His Life and Legacy, and The Gospel of Sri Ramakrishna) that encompass these aspects. If the initiate is deemed worthy, then the leader of the mission gives mantra-dīkṣā using the Ramakrishna Mantra, resulting in the initiate leading the life of a renunciant.

== Vaishnav ==
=== Pushtimarga ===
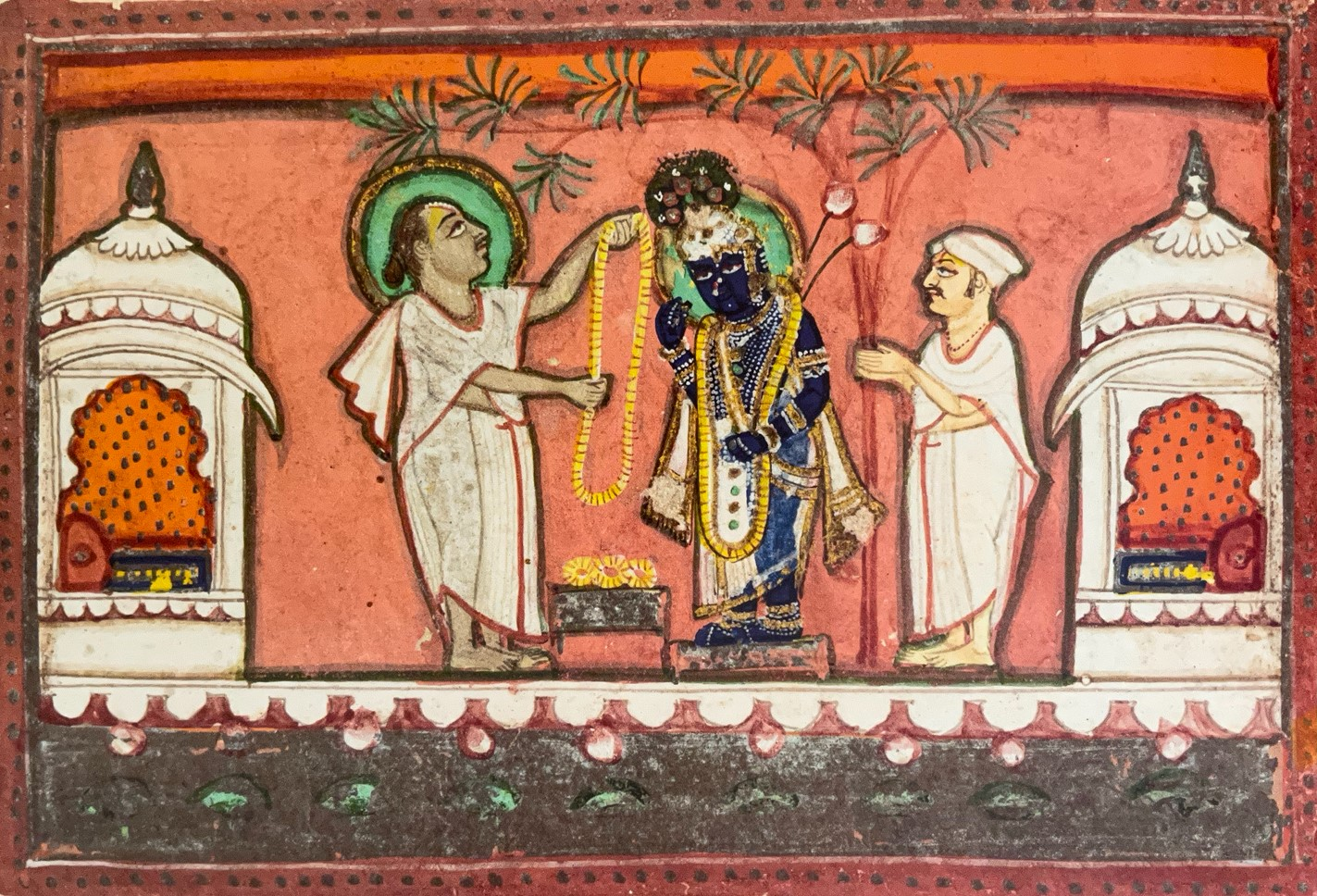
Vallabha (left) giving Kr̥ṣṇa (center) a sacred thread after having received the Brahmasambandha mantra.

The Pushtimarga Sampradaya initiates its devotees through a two-step process. The first part, known as śaraṇa mantropadeśa, is administered in infancy or at a later age if requested. A descendant guru of Vallabhacharya has the initiate repeat the aṣṭākṣara mantra three times, and is given a kaṇṭhī. The second part, known as Brahma-sambandha, takes place before marriage or once the initiate is considered mature enough to grasp its significance. The guru administers the brahma-sambandha mantra, completing the initiation.

=== Gaudiya ===
For members of ISKCON (part of the Gaudiya Vaishnava tradition) the first dīkṣā, or harināma-dīkṣā initiation, is performed as part of a fire sacrifice in which grains, fruit, and ghee are offered into the sacred fire.

=== Swaminarayana ===
Dīkṣā takes place in the Swaminarayan Sampradaya in three ways: (1) brahmachari, (2) sadhu/bhagvati, and (3) parshadi. This diksha is administered by the acarya for the Vadtal and Ahmedabad dioceses and by the guru for the other sects. The initiate bathes, has the hair cut, and comes before the guru. As part of a Vedic ritual, the initiate receives the guru mantra, which translates to "I take refuge in Swaminarayana". The initiate is then given the sacred thread, new clothes, a pagh, a bowl for eating, along with a new name.

== Jainism ==
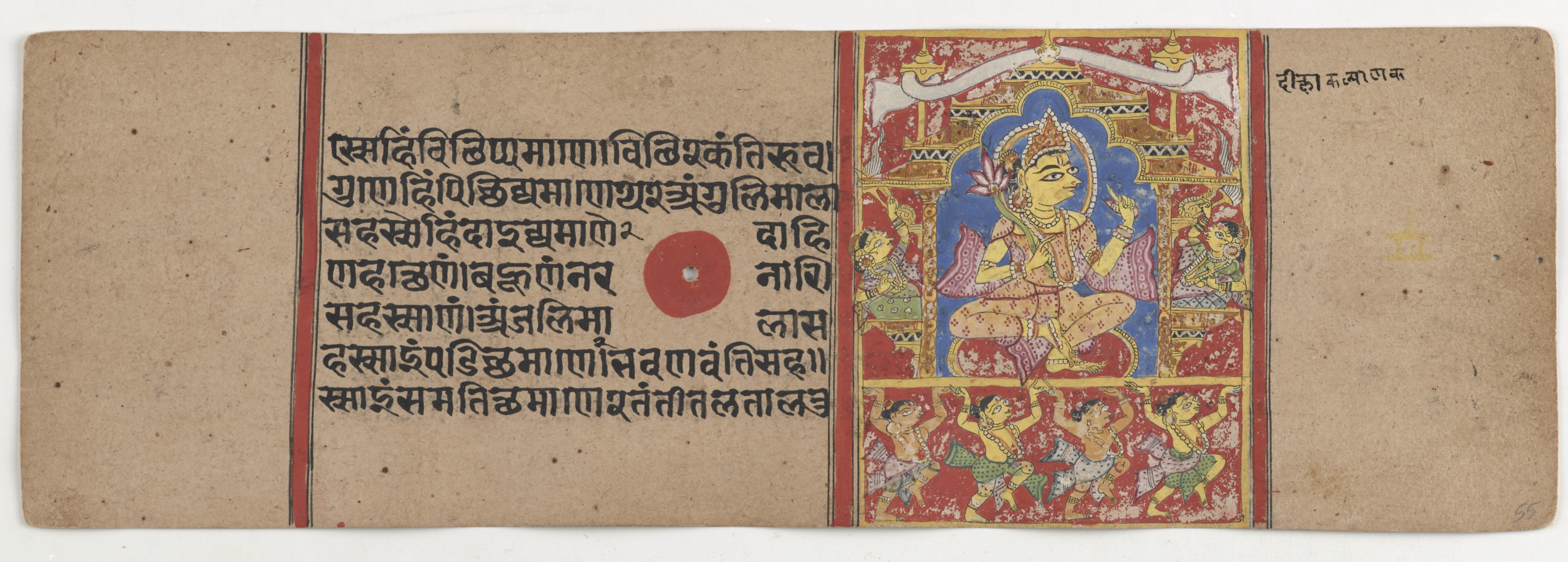
The Initiation Ceremony of Mahavira, Folio from the Kalpa Sutra and Kalacharyakatha.

To join the Jain ascetic community, novices initially undergo a period of training in which they memorize key texts and learn the principles of ascetic life. During the initiation ceremony, the presiding senior ascetic bestows a new name and symbolic implements: Śvetāmbaras receive robes, an alms bowl, a whisk, a staff, and sometimes a mouth-shield (in the case of Sthānakvāsī and Terāpanthī initiates), while Digambaras, who adopt nudity, are given only a whisk and a water pot. Traditionally, novices pulled out their hair as a sign of renunciation, though shaving the head is now customary. After initiation, ascetics join a lineage tracing back to Mahāvīra (for Digambaras) or his disciple Sudharman (for Śvetāmbaras) and are guided by senior ascetics who oversee their conduct and scriptural learning.

== Other living examples ==
Other living traditions and sects approach dīkṣā in various ways.

- Transcendental Meditation (TM) began initiation under the guidance of Maharishi Mahesh Yogi in the late 1950s. New members were initiated through a "devotional ritual (puja) whose focus was Brahmananda Saraswati and the Shankaracharya lineage. Initiates were given a specially suited mantra, and taught how to practice meditation."
- The Saiva Siddhanta Yoga Order (of Hinduism Today's Himalayan Academy) invites spiritually inclined young men under 24 (or under 23 outside the USA) to pursue a monastic path. The initiation process begins with a written introduction to the Satguru, followed by a guided aspirancy and supplicancy period involving celibacy, spiritual study, and temple service, progressing to renewable two-year vows and ultimately, lifetime monastic vows under the guidance of the Satguru.

== Sources ==
- Bennett, Peter John (1983). Temple Organisation and Worship Among the Puṣṭimārgīya Vaiṣṇavas of Ujjain (PDF) (PhD thesis). University of London. p. 130-131.
- Bhuteshananda, Swami (2001). "Spiritual Initiation Requires Preparation". Hinduism Today. Hawaii: Himalayan Academy Publications.
- Coward, Harold G.; Goa, David J. (2004). Mantra: hearing the divine in India and America. Columbia University Press. ISBN 978-0-231-12960-2.
- Deepa, D. (2014). Temple Management in the Āgamas (PhD thesis). University of Madras. p. 132-134. hdl:10603/200379.
- Dundas, Paul (2002). The Jains. Psychology Press. ISBN 978-0-415-26605-5.
- Gallagher, Eugene V.; Ashcraft, W. Michael (2006). Introduction to new and alternative religions in America. Westport, Conn: Greenwood Press. p. 23. ISBN 0-275-98713-2.
- Grimes, John A. (1996). A concise dictionary of Indian philosophy. SUNY Press. ISBN 978-0-7914-3067-5.
- Hallstrom, Lisa Lassell (1999). Mother of Bliss: Ānandamayī Mā (1896-1982). Oxford University Press US. pp. 140–144. ISBN 978-0-19-511647-2.
- Humes, Cynthia; Forsthoefel, Thomas (2005). "Maharishi Mahesh Yogi: Beyond the TM Technique". Gurus in America. New York: State Univ. of New York. ISBN 9780791465745.
- Jaini, Padmanabh S. (1998). The Jaina Path of Purification. Motilal Banarsidass Publishers. ISBN 978-81-208-1578-0.
- Jnanadananda, Swami. "Spiritual Initiation or Mantra-Diksha". Ramakrishna Math Hyderabad.
- Kanta, Surya (1954). "Tāntric Dīkṣā". Annals of the Bhandarkar Oriental Research Institute. 35 (1/4): 10–19. ISSN 0378-1143. JSTOR 41784913.
- McDaniel, June (1989). The madness of the saints: ecstatic religion in Bengal. Chicago: Univ. of Chicago Press. ISBN 0-226-55723-5.
- Pandey, Vraj Kumar (2007). Encyclopaedia of Indian philosophy. Anmol Publications. ISBN 978-81-261-3112-9.
- Prajnananda, Paramahamsa (2006). Jnana Sankalini Tantra. Motilal Banarsidass Publishing House. ISBN 978-81-208-3145-2.
- Vivekjivandas, Sadhu (2010). Hinduism: an Introduction (1 ed.). Ahmedabad: Swaminarayan Aksharpith. ISBN 978-81-7526-434-2.
- Williams, Raymond B. (1984). The New Face of Hinduism: The Swaminarayan Religion (1 ed.). Cambridge: Press Syndicate of the University of Cambridge. ISBN 0-52127473-7.

== See also ==
- Abhisheka
- Brahmin
- Dvija
- Initiation
- Rite of passage
- Parampara
- Prana Pratishtha
- Ordination
- Shakti
- Shaktipata
- Tantra
