= Harappan language =

Language of the Bronze Age civilization of the Indus Valley

Harappan
- Indus language
- (undeciphered)
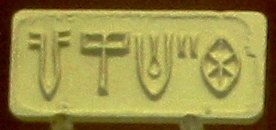
- Impression of an Indus stamp seal, showing a string of five "Harappan script" glyphs; the Indus script is interpreted by some scholars as the writing system of the Harappan language.
- Native to: Indus Valley Civilisation
- Region: Indus Valley
- Extinct: c. 1300 BC or later
- Language family: unclassified
- Writing system: Indus script

Language codes
- ISO 639-3: xiv
- Glottolog: hara1272

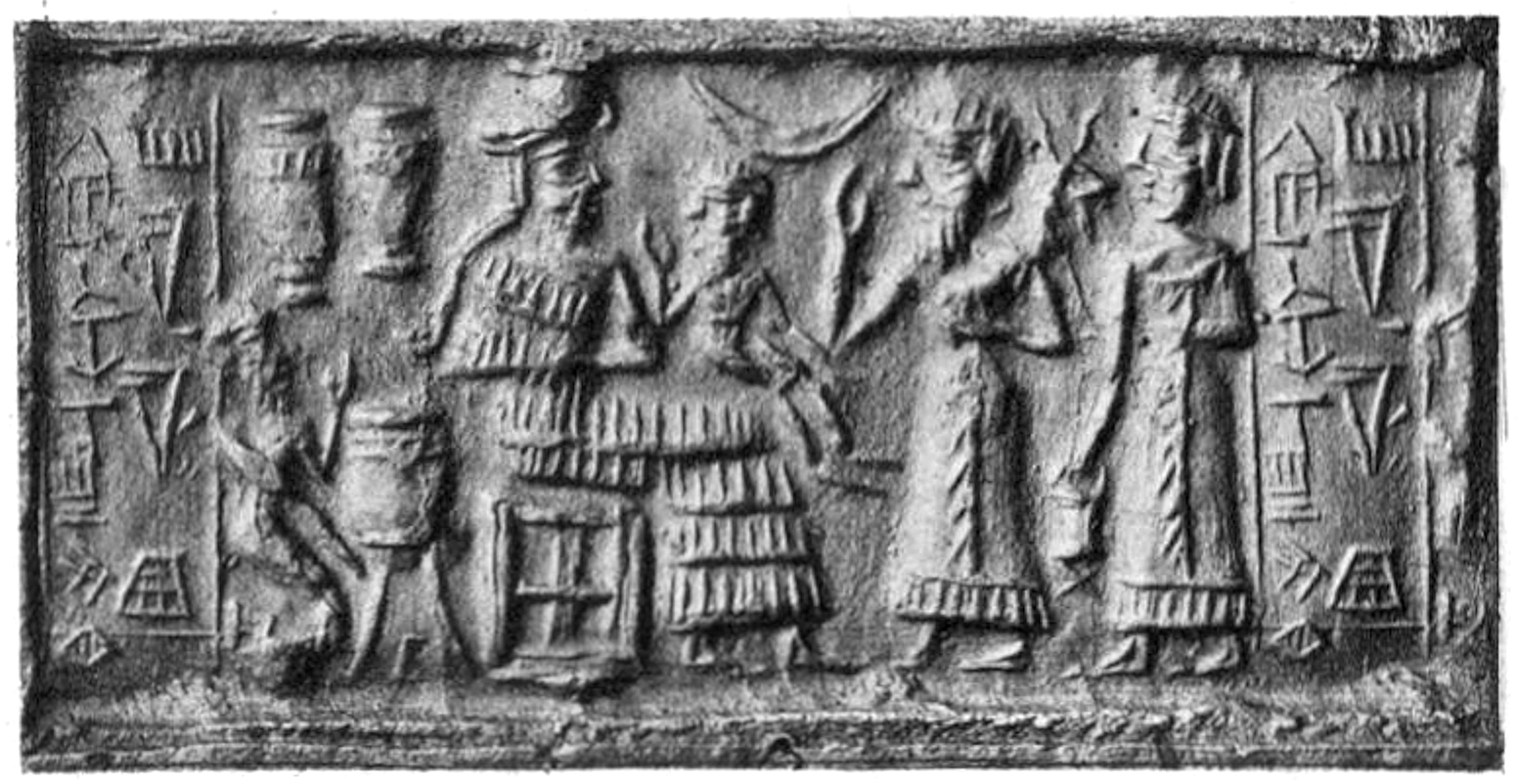
Impression of an Akkadian Empire cylinder seal with inscription: "Shu-ilishu, interpreter of the language of Meluhha"; Louvre Museum, reference AO 22310.

The Harappan language, also known as the Indus language, is the unknown language or languages of the Bronze Age (c. 3300 to 1300 BC) Harappan civilisation (Indus Valley civilisation, or IVC). The Harappan script is yet undeciphered; it has not even been demonstrated to be a writing system, and therefore the language remains unknown. The language being yet unattested in readable contemporary sources, hypotheses regarding its nature are based on possible loanwords, the substratum in Vedic Sanskrit, and some terms recorded in Sumerian cuneiform (such as Meluhha), in conjunction with analyses of the Harappan script.

There are some possible loanwords from the language of the Indus Valley civilisation. Meluḫḫa or Melukhkha (Sumerian: 𒈨𒈛𒄩𒆠 Me-luḫ-ḫa^{KI}) is the Sumerian name of a prominent trading partner of Sumer during the Middle Bronze Age. Its identification remains an open question, but most scholars associate it with the Indus Valley Civilisation. Asko Parpola identifies Proto-Dravidians with the Harappan Culture and the Meluhhan people mentioned in Sumerian records. In his book Deciphering the Indus Script, Parpola states that the Brahui people of Pakistan are remnants of the Harappan culture. According to him, the word "Meluhha" derives from the Dravidian words mel ("elevated") and akam ("place"). Parpola also relates Meluhha with Balochistan, which he calls the "Proto-Dravidian homeland". He also relates Meluhha with the transient word Mleccha, a Vedic word used to mean "barbarian" and used by the incoming Indo-Aryan-speaking population for the native Harappan population.

== Identification ==
There are a number of hypotheses as to the nature of this unknown language:

- A prevalent hypothesis places it within or near the Dravidian languages, perhaps identical with Proto-Dravidian itself. Proposed by Henry Heras in the 1950s, the hypothesis has gained some plausibility and is endorsed by Kamil Zvelebil, Asko Parpola and Iravatham Mahadevan. A 2021 research paper argues that Proto-Dravidian was spoken in the Indus Valley based on the Dravidian word for "tooth" (or "tusk"), as well as genetic migration patterns.
- A "language isolate", i.e. a language with no living continuants (or perhaps a last living reflex in the moribund Nihali language). In this case, the only trace left by the language of the Indus Valley civilisation would be historical substratum influence, in particular the substratum in Vedic Sanskrit.

=== Multiple languages ===
The Indus script only indicates that it was used to write one language (if any), but it is quite possible that multiple languages were spoken in the IVC, much as Sumerian and Akkadian co-existed in Mesopotamia for centuries. Jane R. McIntosh suggests one such possibility: Para-Munda was originally the main language of the civilization, especially in the Punjab region. Later, the proto-Dravidian immigrants introduced their language to the area in the 5th millennium BC. The Dravidian language was spoken by the new settlers in the southern plains, while Para-Munda remained the main language of those in Punjab.

=== Other theories ===
- Michael Witzel suggested as an alternative, that an underlying, prefixing language similar to Austroasiatic, notably Khasi; he called it "para-Munda" (i.e. a language related to the Munda subgroup or other Austroasiatic languages, but not strictly descended from the last common predecessor of the contemporary Munda family). Witzel argued that the Rigveda showed signs of this hypothetical Harappan influence in the earliest historic level, and Dravidian only in later levels, suggesting that speakers of Austroasiatic were the original inhabitants of Punjab and that the Indo-Aryans encountered Dravidian speakers only in later times. The theory was since further supported by Franklin Southworth.. As of 2019, Witzel prefers to leave the question of the original Indian language(s) open until better reconstructions for Dravidian and Munda substrate components in Indo-Aryan languages have been done.
- Indo-European languages: generally believed to be arriving after 1800 BCE, but recent genetic and linguistic study suggests that the language family emerged from the Fertile Crescent as early as 6000 BCE and likely spread to South Asia.

== See also ==
- Elamo-Dravidian languages
- Indo-Mesopotamia relations
- Megalithic graffiti symbols
