= Krishna Rao =

Krishna Rao or Krishnarao is an Indian full name based on the given name Krishna and the surname Rao.

- A. N. Krishna Rao (1908–1971), one of the well-known writers in Kannada language
- Bhavaraju Venkata Krishna Rao (born 1930), Indian cricketer
- Dronamraju Krishna Rao (born 1937), Indian geneticist
- K. V. Krishna Rao (1923-2016), chief of Indian army and governor of Jammu & Kashmir, Nagaland, Manipur and Tripura
- Mandali Venkata Krishna Rao (1926–1997), Indian politician
- U. Krishna Rao (died 1961), Indian politician of the Indian National Congress and member of the Legislative Assembly of Madras state
- Krishna Rao (director), film/television director and cinematographer
- Krishna Rao Voomaji Rao Ghorpade, better known as K. V. Ghorpade, Indian pathologist
- Krishna Rao (administrator) (died 1857), acting Diwan of Travancore
- Krishna Rao (archaeologist) (born 1930), Indian archaeologist and writer
- Krishnarao Jaisim, Indian architect
- Shamsher Bahadur I (Krishna Rao), Maratha noble

== See also ==
- Krishna (disambiguation)
- Rao (disambiguation)
