= Krishna (disambiguation) =

Krishna is a Hindu deity.

Krishna may also refer to:

== Buddhist ==
The name comes from a Sanskrit word (कृष्ण, kṛṣṇa) that means 'black' or 'dark blue'. Certain other figures within Hinduism also have names transliterated as Krishna. These include (with added phonetic spellings);

- Vyasa - Kṛṣṇa Dvaipāyana (the dark one born on an island)
- Draupadi - Kṛṣṇā Pānchali, कृष्णा, Krishnaa (the dark one the princess of Panchala, feminine form)
- Arjuna - he is called Kṛṣṇa in one instance toward the end of his life
- Durga - she is called Kṛṣṇā in the Virataparva (feminine form)
- Krishnaism

=== Related ===
- Krishna Janmashtami, a Hindu festival.
- Krishna Yajurveda (Black Yajurveda), one of the two samhitas (collections) of Yajurveda, Hindu religious text
- Krishna, the Supreme Personality of Godhead, also known as Kṛṣṇa book
- The Krishnas, International Society for Krishna Consciousness (popularly called the "Hare Krishnas"), a Gaudiya Vaishnava religious movement
  - Hare Krishna (mantra), a 16-word Vaishnava mantra brought to international attention by the Society

== Geography ==
- Krishnaveni (disambiguation) or Krishna River
  - Krishna River, a river in the Deccan plateau of India
- Krishna district, a district of Andhra Pradesh, named after Krishna River
- Krishna Wildlife Sanctuary, a wildlife refuge in Andhra Pradesh
- Godavari-Krishna mangroves, a mangrove ecosystem formed by the delta of river Krishna
- Krishnanagar, Nadia, a city in West Bengal

== Film and TV ==
- Krishna (1996 Hindi film), a 1996 Hindi film starring Sunil Shetty and Karishma Kapoor
- Krishna (1996 Tamil film), a 1996 Tamil language film directed by Raja Krishnamoorthy
- Krishna (2006 film), a 2006 animated feature, the first one in Hindi
- Krishna (2007 film), a 2007 Kannada film starring Ganesh and Pooja Gandhi
- Krishna (2008 film), a 2008 Telugu film starring Ravi Teja and Trisha Krishnan
- Krishna, the Malayalam-dubbed version of the 2008 Telugu film Parugu
- Shri Krishna (1993 TV series), a TV series produced by Ramanand Sagar, Anand Sagar, and Moti Sagar
- Krishna Pandit, a fictional character portrayed by Darshan Kumar in the 2022 Indian film The Kashmir Files

== People ==
- Kṛṣṇa Daivajña, a 16th-17th century astrologer-astronomer-mathematician
- Krishna (Satavahana dynasty), c. 1st century BCE king of Deccan region in India
- Krishna I (756–774), king of the Rashtrakuta Empire of India after Dantidurga
- Krishna II (878–914), king of the Rashtrakuta Empire of India after Amoghavarsha I
- Krishna III (939–967), King of the Rashtrakuta Empire of India after Amoghavarsha III
- Krishna of Devagiri ( c. 1246–1261), Yadava king of India
- Lal Krishna Advani, Indian politician
- S. M. Krishna (1932–2024), politician from Karnataka
- Krishna (politician) (1941–2021), politician from Karnataka
- Krishna (Kannada actor), Kannada film actor
- Krishna (Malayalam actor), Malayalam film actor
- Krishna (Tamil actor), Tamil film actor
- Krishna (Telugu actor), Indian Telugu film actor
- Krishna (TV actor) (born 1982), Indian film and television actor
- Krishna (director), Krishnan K.T. Nagarajan, Indian director of Tamil films
- Krishna Beuraa, Indian playback singer
- Krishna Bhagavaan, Indian Telugu film actor
- Krishna Bhanji, the birth name of actor Sir Ben Kingsley
- Krishna Chandra Bhattacharya, Hindu philosopher at Calcutta University
- Krishna Deva Raya (1509–1529), emperor of the Vijayanagara Empire
- Krishna Foster (born 1970), American environmental chemist
- Krishna Kumar (actor), Tamil and Malayalam film actor
- Krishna Kumari (actress) (1933–2018), Indian Telugu film actress
- Krishna Menon (1897–1974), Indian Defence Minister during the Sino-Indian War
- Prasidh Krishna, Indian cricketer
- Krishna Rao (disambiguation)
- Krishna Savjani (born 1947), Malawian lawyer
- Krishna Sekhar, Tamil film actor
- Krishna Vamsi, Indian Telugu film director
- Krishna Rani (born 2001), Bangladeshi footballer
- Roy Krishna, Fijian professional footballer
- Tottempudi Krishna, Indian Telugu film director
- KRSNA (rapper) (Krishna Kaul), Indian rapper known as KR$NA
- Jiddu Krishnamurti (1895–1986), Indian philosopher
- Krishna Prasad Bhattarai, 29th Prime Minister of Nepal, also called Kisoonji
- Shree Krishna Shrestha, Nepali film actor

== Other ==
- Krishna Express, a train of the Indian South Central Railway
- Krishna Patrika, a Telugu language newspaper
- Krishna University, a university in Machilipatnam, Krishna district, Andhra Pradesh, India
- USS Krishna (ARL-38)
- Krishna, a 1971 horror novel by Indian writer Narayan Dharap

== See also ==
- Krsna (disambiguation)
- Krish (disambiguation)
- Krishnaiah (disambiguation)
- Krishnayya (disambiguation)
- Krishnappa (disambiguation)
- Kishan (disambiguation)
- Kanha (disambiguation)
- Black God (disambiguation)
- Shyam (disambiguation)
- Shyama (disambiguation)
- Krushna, an Indian name, alternative spelling of Krishna
- Rajadhi Raja Raja Kulothunga Raja Marthanda Raja Gambeera Kathavaraya Krishna Kamarajan, a 1993 Indian film by Balu Anand
- INS Krishna
