= Are Avaaj Konacha =

Are Avaaj Konacha अरे आवाज कोणाचा
- Directed by: Hemant Deodhar
- Written by: Adv. Anish Padekar.
- Screenplay by: Pratap Gangavane
- Produced by: Commonman Films
- Starring: Dr. Amol Kolhe; Uday Tikekar; Tushar Dalvi; Yashodhan Bal; Aishrya Narkar; Vishakha Subhedar; Manoj Joshi; Atharv Karve; Vidyadhar Joshi
- Release date: 18 October 2013
- Country: India
- Language: Marathi

Are Avaaj Konacha (Marathi: अरे आवाज कोणाचा) is a 2013 Marathi movie directed by Hemant Deodhar. The film will emphasize on the life of karyakarta, their problems, the challenges they face during addressing the problems of society, political pressures.

== Plot ==
Are Avaaj Konacha .... ?, a slogan best known and said during many political campaigns by several opinion leaders. For years together this slogan has brought everyone together.... One inner voice ...one slogan ....'Are avaaj konacha......?'

With change in time and high exposure the charm of our own ideologies of togetherness is lost. But even in such a lifestyle, there are few people in this society who have kept themselves rooted with utmost sincerity, with no selfish motives and with absolute urge to eradicate anti social elements from the society and support everyone for their well-being, these set of people are called KARYAKARTA (Social Worker), people who take an effort to solve the unanswered problems of the common man.

== Cast ==
- Dr. Amol Kolhe As Uday Sawant
- Uday Tikekar As Annasaheb
- Tushar Dalvi As Nanasaheb
- Aishwarya Narkar As Uday's Mother (Aai)
- Vishakha Subhedar As Tai
- Manoj Joshi As Commissioner
- Atharva Karve As Child Uday Sawant
- Vidyadhar Joshi As Advocate Bhosale
- Yashodhan Bal As Mr Ganu

== Soundtrack ==
No.	Title	Singer(s)	Length
1	"Jaighosh Chale Tujha Morya"	Neha Rajpal, Vivek Naik, Harshal Garud	5:43
2	"Are Avaaj Konacha"	Neha Rajpal, Krushna	3:16
3	"Aamhi Mavle Mavle"	Anand Shinde	4:14
4	"Re Swami Raya"	Hariharan	5:42
