= Krsna (disambiguation) =

Krishna or Krsna is a major deity in Hinduism.

Krsna may also refer to:

- KRSNA (rapper), stage name stylised as KR$NA, formerly known as YoungProzpekt, Indian rapper and songwriter
- Krsna Solo (born Amitav Sarkar), Indian music composer, singer-songwriter and a music producer

== See also ==
- Krishna (disambiguation)
- Hare Krsna TV, an international media network and 24x7 free to air TV channel launched in India
- Kršna Glava, a village in the municipality of Ub, Serbia
