= Ahmuvan =

Possible name of an Indus Valley Civilization deity

Ahmuvan has been suggested as the name of an Indus Valley Civilization deity. The deity is pictured on Indus Valley tablets as an elongated anthropomorphic figure with three protuberances in the head. This deity is suggested to be associated with the Tamil god Murugan. Since the material is scarse and the Indus script is hard to interpret, the suggestions as yet are rather tentative, "bold guesses".
