= Kishen =

Kishen is a given name and a surname. Notable people with the name include:

- Lal Kishen Advani (born 1927), Indian politician, 7th Deputy Prime Minister of India
- Kishen Das, Indian actor, content creator and YouTuber
- Kishen Kamania (born 1994), Tanzanian cricketer
- Kishen Singh Kapoor (1873–1936), mathematician, author and teacher
- Prem Kishen (born 1953), Indian actor, turned TV and film produce
- Ravi Kishen (born 1969), Indian actor, politician, film producer and TV personality
- Swaroop Kishen (1930–1992), Indian Test cricket umpire
- Kishen Kower (princess) (1794–1810), Rajput princess of the Udaipur State of India
- Kishen Maharaj (1923–2008), Indian tabla player, member of the Benares gharana of Hindustani classical music
- Kishen Narsi (born 1939), vice-chairman of the executive committee of the International Boxing Association
- Kishen Pattnaik (1930–2004), Indian social leader, socialist thinker, author and activist
- Kishen Pershad GCIE (1864–1940), Indian noble who served as Prime Minister of Hyderabad twice
- Kishen Singh, former national polo player from India
- Kishen Singh (explorer) (1850–1921), native Indian explorer employed by the Survey of India
- Kishen Velani (born 1994), English cricketer

== See also ==
- Kishen Chand Law College, private law school in Rajpura Chungi in Jammu and Kashmir
- Kishen Kanhaiya, 1990 Indian Hindi action comedy film
- Jai Kishen, 1994 Bollywood action drama film
- Kishen ganga, a river in the Kashmir region of Pakistan and India
- Kisen
- Kishan (disambiguation)
- Kishin (disambiguation)
