= Dasa =

Sanskrit term found in ancient Indian texts

Dāsa is originally a Sanskrit word found in ancient Indian texts, including the Rigveda, Pali canon, and Arthashastra. The Sanskrit term Dasa (or Das) generally translates to devotee, disciple, votary, or one engaged in selfless service or seva. It is primarily used as a surname and as an honorific title across communities to signify humility, servitude, and devotion.

Dāsa, in some contexts, is also related to dasyu or asura, which have been translated by some scholars as "demon", "slave," "servant," or "barbarian," depending on the context in which the word is used.

== Etymology ==
Dāsa first appears in Vedic texts from the second millennium BCE. There is no consensus on its origins.

Karl Heinrich Tzschucke in 1806, in his translations of the Roman geographer Pomponius Mela, noted etymological and phonological parallels between dasa and the ethnonyms of the Dahae – Persian داها Dāhā; Sanskrit Dāsa; Latin Dahae; Greek Δάοι Daoi, Δάαι, Δᾶαι Daai and Δάσαι Dasai – a people who lived on the south-eastern shores of the Caspian Sea in ancient times (and from whom modern Dehestan/Dehistan takes its name).

Monier Monier-Williams in 1899, stated that the meaning of dāsa varies contextually and means "mysterious forces", "savages", "barbarians" or "demons" in the earliest layer of Vedic literature – in other contexts, is a self-effacing way to refer oneself as "worshipper" or "devotee aiming to honor a deity", or a "servant of god". In later Indian literature, according to Monier-Williams, usage of dasa is used to refer to "a knowing man, or a knower of the universal spirit". In the latter sense, dāsa is masculine, while the feminine equivalent is dāsi. Some early 20th century translators, such as P. T. Srinivasa Iyengar (1912), translate dasa as "slave".

Kangle in 1960, and others suggest that, depending on the context, dāsa may be translated as "enemy", "servant" or "religious devotee". More recent scholarly interpretations of the Sanskrit words dāsa or dasyu suggest that these words used throughout the Vedas represents "disorder, chaos and dark side of human nature", and the verses that use the word dāsa mostly contrast it with the concepts of "order, purity, goodness and light." In some contexts, the word dāsa may refer to enemies, in other contexts it may refer to those who had not adopted the Vedic beliefs, and yet other contexts it may refer to mythical enemies in the battle between good and evil.

In Pali texts, the term dāsa is mentioned to denote a slave. Dasa in Buddhist texts can mean "servant". In Pali language, it is used as suffix in Buddhist texts, where Amaya-dāsa was translated by Davids and Stede in 1925, as a "slave by birth", Kila-dasa translated as a "bought slave", and Amata-dāsa as "one who sees Amata (Sanskrit: Amr̥ta, nectar of immortality) or Nibbana (Sanskrit: Nirvāṇa)".

Dr. Bhimrao Ambedkar, explores whether Dasa were a native tribe aboriginal to India by finding the connection between their mention in Rig Ved and the Azhi-Dahaka of the Zend Avesta. The name Azhi-Dahaka is a compound name which consists of two parts. Azhi means serpent or dragon and Dahaka comes from the root "Dah" meaning "to sting, to do harm". He states that Dasa in Sanskrit could easily mean Daha in Avesta, as 'Sa' in former translates to 'Ha' in latter. Apart from this similarity, the description of both their physical appearance is mentioned to be 'three-headed' and 'six-eyed'.

Michael Witzel compares the etymological root of dasa to words from other Indo-European languages that imply "enemy, foreigner", including the Avestan dahåka and dŋha, Latin dahi and Greek daai.

Asko Parpola in 2015, has proposed that dasa is related to the ancient Iranian and proto-Saka word daha, which means "man". This is contrasted with arya, the word for "man" used by, and of, Indo-Iranian people from Central Asia.

== Identification of Dasa ==
=== As people ===
Max Müller proposed that dāsa referred to indigenous peoples living in South Asia before the arrival of the Aryans.

Michael Witzel in his review of Indo-Iranian texts in 1995, states that dasa in the Vedic literature represented a North Iranian tribe, who were enemies of the Vedic Aryans, and das-yu meant "enemy, foreigner." He notes that these enemies could have apparently become slaves if captured.

Asko Parpola states that dāsa referred only to Central Asian peoples. Vedic texts that include prayers for the defeat of the dāsa as an "enemy people", according to Parpola, possibly refers to people from the so-called Bactria–Margiana Archaeological Complex (BMAC), who spoke a different language and opposed Aryan religious practices. Parpola uses archaeological and linguistic arguments to support his theory. Among the evidences cited were recent BMAC excavation results where forts in circular shapes were found, the shape described in the early parts of the Rigveda as the enemy forts of Indra. He also found that Rigvedic words with vocalic r̥ in their first syllable - for instance, r̥bīsa- “oven” or śr̥gāla- “jackal” - are likely loanwords from the unknown BMAC language.

Some scholars have also or instead connected the name Dahae to the Sanskrit word Dasa (Sanskrit दास Dāsa) – a people mentioned in ancient Hindu texts, such as the Rigveda – as enemies of the Ārya. Dasa appears to share the same root as the Sanskrit dasyu, meaning "hostile people" or "demons" – as well as the Avestan dax́iiu and Old Persian dahyu or dahạyu, meaning "province" or "mass of people".

=== As spiritual entity ===
Authors like Sri Aurobindo believe that words like Dāsa are used in the Rigveda symbolically and should be interpreted spiritually, and that Dasa does not refer to human beings, but rather to demons who hinder the spiritual attainment of the mystic. Many Dāsas are purely mythical and can only refer to demons. There is for example a Dāsa called Urana with 99 arms (RV II.14.4), and a Dāsa with six eyes and three heads in the Rigveda.

Aurobindo commented that in the RV III.34 hymn, where the word Arya varna occurs, Indra is described as the increaser of the thoughts of his followers: "the shining hue of these thoughts, sukram varnam asam, is evidently the same as that sukra or sveta Aryan hue which is mentioned in verse 9. Indra carries forward or increases the "colour" of these thoughts beyond the opposition of the Panis, pra varnam atiracchukram; in doing so he slays the Dasyus and protects or fosters and increases the Aryan "colour", sahatvi dasyun pra aryam varnam avat."

According to Aurobindo (The Secret of the Veda), RV 5.14.4 is a key for understanding the character of the Dasyus:

Agni born shone out slaying the Dasyus, the darkness by the light, he found the Cows, the Waters, Swar. (transl. Aurobindo)

Aurobindo explains that in this verse the struggle between light and darkness, truth and falsehood, divine and undivine is described.

== Hindu Texts ==
=== Rig Veda ===
Dāsa and related words such as Dasyu are found in the Rig Veda. They have been variously translated, depending on the context. These words in some context represent "disorder, chaos and dark side of human nature", and the verses that use the word dasa mostly contrast it with the concepts of "order, purity, goodness and light." In other contexts, the word dasa refers to enemies and in other contexts, those who had not adopted the Vedic beliefs.

A. A. Macdonell and A. B. Keith in 1912 remarked that, "The great difference between the Dasyus and the Aryans was their religion... It is significant that constant reference is made to difference in religion between Aryans and Dasa and Dasyu."

==== Dasa with the meaning of Barbarians ====
Rig Veda 10.22.8 describes Dasyus as "savages" who have no laws, different observances, a-karman (who do not perform rites) and who act against a person without knowing the person.

अकर्मा दस्युरभि नो अमन्तुरन्यव्रतो अमानुषः ।
त्वं तस्यामित्रहन्वधर्दासस्य दम्भय ॥८॥

Around us is the Dasyu, riteless, void of sense, inhuman, keeping alien laws.
Baffle, thou Slayer of the foe, the weapon which this Dasa wields.
– Translated by Ralph Griffith

The Dasyu practising no religious rites, not knowing us thoroughly, following other observances, obeying no human laws,
Baffle, destroyer of enemies [Indra], the weapon of that Dasa.
– Translated by H. H. Wilson

— Rigveda 10.22.8

==== Dasa with the meaning of Demons ====
Within the Vedic texts, Dasa is the word used to describe supernatural demonic creatures with many eyes and many heads. This has led scholars to interpret that the word Dasa in Vedic times meant evil, supernatural, destructive forces. For example, Rigveda in hymn 10.99.6 states,

स इद्दासं तुवीरवं पतिर्दन्षळक्षं त्रिशीर्षाणं दमन्यत् ।
अस्य त्रितो न्वोजसा वृधानो विपा वराहमयोअग्रया हन् ॥६॥

The sovereign Indra attacking him overcame the loud shouting, six eyed, three headed Dasa,
Trita invigorated by his strength, smote the cloud with his iron-tipped finger.

— Rigveda 10.99.6, translated by H. H. Wilson

==== Dasa with the meaning of Servant ====
Dasa is also used in Vedic literature, in some contexts, to refer to "servants", a few translate this as "slaves", but the verses do not describe how the Vedic society treats or mistreats the servants. R. S. Sharma, in his 1958 book, states that the only word which could possibly mean slave in Rigveda is dāsa, and this sense of use is traceable to four verses out of 10,600 verses in Rigveda, namely 1.92.8, 1.158.5, 10.62.10 and 8.56.3. The translation of word dasa to servant or slave varies by scholars. HH Wilson, for example, translates Dasa in Rigvedic instances identified by Sharma, as servant rather than slave, as in verse 10.62.10:

उत दासा परिविषे स्मद्दिष्टी गोपरीणसा । यदुस्तुर्वश्च मामहे ॥१०॥

Yadu and Indra speaking auspiciously, and possessed of numerous cattle, gave them like servants, for the enjoyment.

— Rigveda 10.62.10, Translated by HH Wilson

R. S. Sharma translates dasi in a Vedic era Upanishads as "maid-servant".

==== Aryan-Dasa conflict ====
Hermann Oldenberg states that no distinction between historical events and mythology existed for the Vedic poets. For them, the conflict between the Aryans and Dasas extended into the realms of gods and demons with the hostile demon being on the same level as the hated and despised savages.

Bridget Allchin and Raymond Allchin suggest Indo-Aryans were not the only inhabitants of the region when they arrived to Sapta-Sindhava or land of seven rivers and their encounter with Dasyu was not entirely peaceful.

Ram Sharan Sharma states that the Rig-Vedic society was primarily organized on basis of tribe, kin and lineage. The "Aryan" tribes mentioned by the Rig Veda therefore may not have been of the same ethnicity, but may have been united by a common language and way of life. He states that while it has been argued that Dasyu and Dasa were not non-Aryans, it is more true in the case of the latter. Further the Dasas are said to be organized into tribes called viś, a term used for Vedic people or tribes. The god Indra is said to be the conqueror of Dasas, who appear mostly human. There are more references to the destruction of Dasyus by Indra instead of Dasas. He is said to have protected the Aryan varna by killing them. The Aryans also fought between themselves. The god Manyu is invoked to overcome both Aryans and Dasyus. Indra is asked to fight against the godless Dasyus and Aryans, who are the enemies of his followers. (X, 88, 3 & XX, 36, 10).

The fight between Aryans and their enemies consisted mostly of fortresses and walled settlements of the latter. Both Dasas and Dasyus were in the possession of them. Sharma states that this reminds us of the later discovery of fortifications of Harappan settlements, though there is no clear archaeological evidence of mass-scale confrontation between Aryans and Harappans. He adds that the Aryans seemed to be attracted to their wealth over which regular warfare took place. The worshiper in the Rig Veda expects that those who offered no oblation should be killed and their wealth be divided (I, 176, 4). However, it was the cattle which held the most importance to Aryans who were cattle-herders. For example, it is argued that Kikatas didn't need cows because they made no use of milk products in sacrifice.

Sacrifice played an important part in Aryan way of life, however the Dasyus or Dasas did not offer sacrifices. An entire passage in the seventh book of Rig Veda uses adjectives such as akratün, aśraddhān and ayajñān applied to Dasyus emphasizes their non-sacrificing character. Indra is asked to discriminate between them and the sacrificing Aryas. Sharma states that the word anindra (without Indra) may refer to Dasyus, Dasa and Aryan dissenters. Per the Aryan view, the Dasyus practiced black magic and Atharva Veda refers to them as evil spirits to be scared away from the sacrifice. The Atharva Veda states that the god-blaspheming Dasyus are to be offered as victims. The Dasyus are believed to be treacherous, not practicing Aryan observances, and are hardly human.

Tony Ballantyne states that Rig Veda depicts the cultural differences between the Aryan invaders and non-Aryans of Indus valley. He states that although the inter-Aryan conflict is prominent in its hymns, a cultural opposition is drawn between Aryans and the indigenous people of North India. According to him, it depicts the indigenous tribes such as the Pani and Dasas as godless, savage and untrustworthy. Panis are cattle thieves who seek to deprive Aryans of them. He states Dasas were savages, whose godless society, darker complexion and different language were culturally different from Aryans. They are called barbarians (rakshas), those without fire (anagnitra) and flesh-eaters (kravyad). The Aryas were on the other hand presented as noble people protected by their gods Agni and Indra. He adds that their names were extended beyond them to denote savage and barbarian people in general. He concurs that this continued into later Sanskritic tradition where dasa came to mean a slave while Arya meant noble.

Asko Parpola identifies the Dasyus with the Bactria–Margiana Archaeological Complex (BMAC) and states that term Dasyu might originate from the word Daha which was originally a noun meaning a "male person, man or a hero", and is connected to the Old Iranian language word dahyu. He identifies Tripura with the BMAC settlements like Dashly-3 in northern Afghanistan which had forts with three concentric walls, a tradition which survived in Bactria until Achaemenid times. In addition, he states that the description of Rig Veda about the Aryans always losing to the Asuras who had forts in the earlier part of the text was due to them encountering the forts of the BMAC. The Rig Veda also describes the opulence and power of the Dasyus, who defend their cattle with sharp weapons, horses and chariots. Parpola identifies with the riches of the BMAC and their finely decorated weapons. In addition, the statement of Rig Veda about Dasas worshipping Asuras who were later worshipped in Zorastarianism, with the foremost being Varuna who had a counterpart in Ahura Mazda, and Mitra-Varuna corresponding to Mithra-Ahura. Based on Rig Vedic hymns, Parpola states that Aryans adopted some of the Asuras as gods to please their new Dasyu subjects, and the attestation of both Indra and Varuna in the Mitanni oath of 1380 BCE shows that amalgamation of Aryans and Dasas happened before the former migrated to South Asia.

=== Later Vedic texts ===
The three words Dasa, Dasyu and Asura are used interchangeably in almost identical verses that are repeated in different Vedic texts, such as the Rig Veda, the Saunaka recension of Atharva Veda, the Paippalada Samhita of the Atharva Veda and the Brahmanas text in various Vedas. Such comparative study has led scholars to interpret Dasa and Dasyu may have been a synonym of Asura (demons or evil forces, sometimes simply lords with special knowledge and magical powers) of later Vedic texts.

Sharma states that the word dasa occurs in Aitareya and Gopatha Brahmanas, but not in the sense of a slave.

=== Arthashastra ===
Kautilya's Arthashastra dedicates the thirteenth chapter on dasas, in his third book on law. This Sanskrit document from the Maurya Empire period (4th century BCE), has been translated by several authors. Shamasastry's translation in 1915, Kangle's translation in the 1960s and Rangarajan's translation in 1987 all map dasa as slave. However, Kangle suggests that the context and rights granted to dasa by Kautilya, such as the right to the same wage as a free labourer and the right to freedom on payment of an amount, distinguish this form of slavery from that of contemporary Greece. Edmund Leach points out that the Dasa was the antithesis of the concept of Arya. As the latter term evolved through successive meanings, so did Dasa: from "indigenous inhabitant" to "serf," "tied servant," and finally "chattel slave." He suggests the term "unfreedom" to cover all these meanings.

According to Arthashastra, anyone who had been found guilty of nishpatitah (Sanskrit: निष्पातित, ruined, bankrupt, a minor crime) may mortgage oneself to become dasa for someone willing to pay his or her bail and employ the dasa for money and privileges.

According to Arthashastra, it was illegal to force a dasa (slave) to do certain types of work, to hurt or abuse him, or to force sex on a female dasa.

Employing a slave (dasa) to carry the dead or to sweep ordure, urine or the leavings of food; forcing a slave to be naked; hurting or abusing him; or violating the chastity of a female slave shall cause the forfeiture of the value paid for him or her. Violation of the chastity shall at once earn their liberty for them.

— Arthashastra, Translated by Shamasastry

When a master has connection (sex) with a pledged female slave (dasi) against her will, he shall be punished. When a man commits or helps another to commit rape with a female slave pledged to him, he shall not only forfeit the purchase value, but also pay a certain amount of money to her and a fine of twice the amount to the government.

— Arthashastra, Translated by Shamasastry

A slave (dasa) shall be entitled to enjoy not only whatever he has earned without prejudice to his master's work, but also the inheritance he has received from his father.

— Arthashastra, Translated by Shamasastry

== Buddhist texts ==
Words related to dasa are found in early Buddhist texts, such as dāso na pabbājetabbo, which Davids and Stede translate as "the slave cannot become a Bhikkhu". This restriction on who could become a Buddhist monastic is found in Vinaya Pitakam i.93, Digha Nikaya, Majjhima Nikāya, Tibetan Bhiksukarmavakya and Upasampadajnapti.

In Buddhist scriptures, slavery is a backdrop to the narratives, and dasas (slaves) were among the donations to the monastic community. Various terms were used, like "bondsmen," "proper slave," and "proper bondman", and individuals were treated as property and could be donated as such to monks and monasteries. In various Vinayas, The Buddha permits the offering and utilization of household servants and slaves, along with land, mats, livestock, tools, and medicinal items. At times, slaves were tasked with carrying out actions that were explicitly prohibited for monks

== Other uses ==
=== Use of religious "devotees" ===
In Tamil dasa is commonly used to refer to devotees of Vishnu or Krishna.

In Gaudiya Vaishnavism, devotees often use dasa (meaning slave of Krishna) as part of their names, as in Hari Dasa.

=== As a surname or byname ===
Dasa or Das is also a surname or middle name found among Hindus and Sikhs, typically in northern half of India, where it literally means "votary, devotee, slave of God." For example, Mohandas Gandhi's first name, Mohandas, means slave of Mohan or Krishna. Also, the name Surdas means slave of Sur or Deva. In the past, many saints of the Bhakti movement added it to their names, signifying their total devotion or surrender to God.

== Comparative linguistics ==
Dasa and related terms have been examined by several scholars. While the terms Dasa and Dasyu have a negative meaning in Sanskrit, their Iranian counterparts Daha and Dahyu have preserved their positive (or neutral) meaning. This is similar to the Sanskrit terms Deva (a "positive" term) and Asura (a "negative" term). The Iranian counterparts of these terms (Daeva and Ahura) have opposite meanings.

Asko Parpola states the original Dasa is related to the Old Persian word Daha which also means "man", but refers specifically to a regional ethnic minority of Persia. Parpola contrasts Daha with Arya, stating that the latter also referred to "man" but specifically to the incoming Indo-Iranians from Central Asia. The Vedic text that include prayers to help defeat the "Dasa as enemy people", states Parpola, may refer to the wars of the Indo-Iranians against the bearers of the Bactria–Margiana Archaeological Complex (BMAC) culture. The latter spoke a different language and opposed Indo-Iranian religious practices. Parpola uses archaeological and linguistic arguments to support his theory, but his theory is controversial.

== See also ==
- Déisi
- Mleccha
