= Kishangarh (disambiguation) =

Kishangarh is a city in Ajmer district, Rajasthan.

Kishangarh may refer to several places:

- Kishangarh, Alwar, a city in Alwar district, Rajasthan
- Kishangarh Renwal, a city in Jaipur district, Rajasthan
- Kishangarh Village, a village in Delhi

== See also ==
- Kishan (disambiguation)
