= Krishnappa =

Krishnappa is an Indian male given name and may refer to:

- Bidaram Krishnappa, Carnatic musician
- Kumara Krishnappa Nayak, ruler of the Madurai Nayak dynasty, India
- Tubaki Krishnappa Nayak, army commander in service of the Vijayanagar Empire
- B. Krishnappa, professor in India
- Krishnappa Gowtham, Indian cricketer
- Budhi Kunderan, full name Budhisagar Krishnappa Kunderan, Indian cricketer
- Anantharamu Krishnappa, Indian writer and publisher
- M. V. Krishnappa, Indian politician
- M. Krishnappa (Born 1918), Indian politician
- M. Krishnappa (Born 1953), Indian politician
- M. Krishnappa (Born 1962), Indian politician
- Raja Krishnappa Bairya, a fictional character in the Indian KGF film series

== See also ==
- Krishna (disambiguation)
