= Hare Krsna TV =

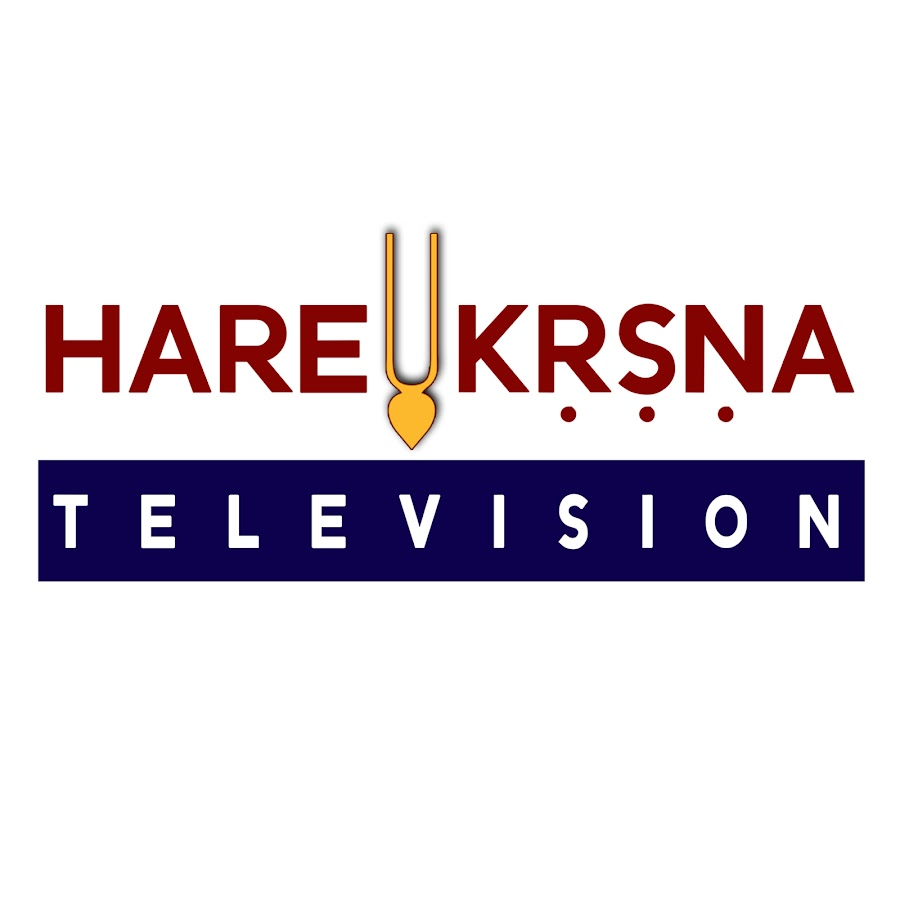
- HareKrsna Television
- Country: India
- Broadcast area: Worldwide
- Network: cable television network
- Headquarters: Srishti Complex, B-001, Dhruva Srishti CHS Ltd, Srishti Sector-2, Mira Road (East), Thane Maharashtra 401107

Programming
- Picture format: 4:3 (SDTV) 16:9 (HDTV)

Ownership
- Owner: Owned by Hare Krsna Content Broadcast Pvt. Ltd (HKCBPL). Licensed by Ministry of Information and Broadcasting, Government of India KSHAMA BIMAL SHAH BIMAL CHANDRAKANT SHAH

History
- Launched: 2016; 10 years ago

Links
- Website: hktv.in//

Hare Krsna Content Broadcast Pvt. Ltd (HKCBPL), is an international media network and TV channel. The media network broadcasts non-denominational, cultural programmes offered by ISKCON and other Spiritual Organizations.

== History ==
The channel was launched on Janmashtami 2016, on the eve of the 50th anniversary of ISKCON for celebrating the various cultural elements of planet earth.

‘Hare Krsna’ TV is free to air, non commercial linear satellite television channel which broadcasts content about International Society for Krishna Consciousness (ISKCON) on Television and OTT Platforms. The channel is owned by Hare Krsna Content Broadcast Pvt. Ltd. The channel is licensed by Ministry of Information and Broadcasting, Government of India.

== Programming ==
Hare Krsna TV Free to Air Channel features content from across 600 ISKCON centers globally and displays events, music, kirtans, yatras, lectures, bhajans, talks, documentaries, food shows, entertaining stories, children's shows, lifestyle content, Geeta discourses, Vedic analysis, and so forth.

=== Notable hosts and speakers ===
- Srila Prabhupada
- Jayapataka Swami
- Radhanath Swami
- Sivarama Swami
- Indradyumna Swami
- Bhakti Charu Swami
- Kadamba Kanana Swami
- Gaur Gopal Prabhu

== Watch Hare Krsna TV On ==
- Dish TV # 1061
- GTPL # 571
- Siti
- Hathway # 834
- Den # 885
- NXT DIGITAL # 978 (InCable # 864)
