= Kishan =

Kishan may refer to:

- Kishan, Iran, a village in Markazi Province, Iran
- Kishan Shrikanth, Indian actor
- Keşan, a town and district in Turkey

== See also ==
- Krishna (disambiguation)
- Kishangarh (disambiguation)
- Kishen also Kishan, an Indian male given name, derived from Krishna
