= Egbert Richter-Ushanas =

Egbert Richter (also publishing under the pen name of Richter-Ushanas, after uśánas, a Vedic rishi) is a German freelance writer and lecturer, author of self-published (Egbert Richter Verlag, registered in Bremen) treatises on Yoga, Vedanta, Esotericism and mythology, translations of some Upanishads, the Bhagavad Gita and the Yoga Sutras of Patanjali as well as original poetry. In his 1992 decipherment claim of the Indus script, he argues that the script is "based very largely on intuition, and this quality is also required for reading it", likening the process of "decipherment" to meditation, concluding that the Rbhus, who Richter alleges were priests of the Harappan civilization, invented the Indus script under the influence of Sumerian cuneiform. Werner (1999) confesses himself "at a loss how to evaluate" Richter's work, admitting the author has thorough knowledge of the various sources he uses, but at the same time completely lacks academic method, discipline or experience.

== Publications ==
=== Philosophical essays and poetry ===
- 1969, Der Perlenfischer. Gedichte, Haikus, Epigramme ISBN 3-924942-07-2
- 1976, Schöngarstige Betrachtungen. Satyrische Gedankengänge zur Lösung von Ungleichungen mit mehreren Bekannten ISBN 3-924942-05-6
- 1987, Die sakrale Liebe im Alten und Neuen Testament im Alten Orient und im Rig-Veda. Eine mythosgeschichtliche Untersuchung, ISBN 3-924942-14-5
- 1992, Jesus der Nazoräer. Ein dramatisches Gedicht , ISBN 3-924942-21-8
- Jesus der Nazoräer. Die Lebensgeschichte des Nazoräers Jesus aus Galiläa nach den biblischen Quellen mythosophisch dargestellt in 12 Bildern ISBN 3-924942-09-9
- 1996, Eros und Mythos - Das Hohelied Salomos. Aus dem Hebräischen übersetzt und in Dialogform gebracht , ISBN 3-924942-19-6
- 2005, Der Geschlechterkampf. Dokumentation einer intergenerationellen Beziehung aus philosophischer und juristischer Sicht ISBN 3-924942-48-X
- 2003, Der Philosoph und das andere Geschlecht. Eine wissenschaftliche Untersuchung über die geistigen Ursachen und Folgen eines körperlich-seelischen Missverständnisses ISBN 3-924942-31-5
- 2003, Wissenschaft und Selbsterkenntnis. Vierundzwanzig Aufsätze zu Philosophie und Religionswissenschaft, Pädagogik, Literatur- und Musikwissenschaft aus indischer und abendländischer Sicht ISBN 3-924942-28-5
- 2005, Die Dreigestalt des Seins und der Androgyne Kosmische Mensch, ISBN 3-924942-46-3
- 2005, Das verborgene Testament. Ein politisches Märchenspiel nach indischen Quellen ISBN 3-924942-56-0
- 2011, Bhagavadgītā - Gesang des Erleuchteten (= IKB Band 60), Verlag Traugott Bautz, Nordhausen 2005

=== Yoga, Vedanta and Sanskrit literature ===
- Das Stillhalten der Fackel - Mandukya-Upanisad mit Gaudapas Karika, 2nd ed. 1985 ISBN 3-924942-12-9
- 1990, Im Wandel das Bleibende. Acht Upanishads ISBN 3-924942-18-8
- 1992, Bhartrihari - Hundert Gedichte über die Liebe und über die Entsagung, ISBN 3-924942-23-4
- 1998, Bhagavadgita - Gesang des Erleuchteten ISBN 3-924942-29-3
- Raja Yoga - Patanjalis Yoga-Sutra - Ein Beitrag zur praktischen Philosophie, 3rd ed. (2001) ISBN 3-924942-20-X, 4th ed (2006) ISBN 3-924942-58-7
- 2002, Das Buch des Waldes. Indische Sagen und Mythen, ISBN 3-924942-11-0, 2nd ed. ISBN 3-924942-45-5
- 2003, Das Pañcatantra in der Fassung des Tantr khy yika. Ein Lehrbuch zur politischen Moral, aus dem Sanskrit übersetzt und aus religionswissenshaftlicher Sicht erläutert, ISBN 3-924942-36-6
- 2005, Die Philosophie der Bhagavadgîtâ. in der indischen Tradition und im Abendland, ISBN 3-924942-41-2
- 2005, Die Dialog-Hymnen des Rg-Veda. Eine Untersuchung zum vedischen Frauenbild, ISBN 3-924942-44-7

=== Decipherments ===
- The Cosmic Man and the Tree of Language. A Contribution to the Deciphering of the Indus Script and the Anthropology of the Ancient Orient ISBN 3-924942-30-7
- 1992 Der fünfte Veda. Die Indus-Siegel im Vergleich zum Rig-Veda. Ein Beitrag zur Entzifferung der Indus-Schrift ISBN 3-924942-17-X,
  - English translation, The Fifth Veda. The Indus Seals in Comparison with the Rig-Veda ISBN 3-924942-16-1
  - review: Karel Werner, Bulletin of the School of Oriental and African Studies, University of London (1999)
- 2000, Die Schrifttafeln der Osterinsel. In der Lesung Metoros und Ure Vaeikos ISBN 3-924942-90-0
  - English: The Inscribed Tablets of Easter Island in the reading of Metoro and Ure Vaeiko. A Contribution to the Decoding of the Rongorongo-Writing (2004) ISBN 3-924942-35-8
- 2001, The Indus Script and the Rg-veda, ISBN 81-208-1405-3
- 2002, Two Systems of Symbolic Writing. The Indus Script and the Easter Island Script ISBN 3-924942-95-1 online version
- 2005, Die Wortschrift der Indus-Kultur. in der vedischen Überlieferung und in den Mythen Europas und des alten Orients, ISBN 3-924942-43-9
- 2005, The Message of the Indus Seals and Tablets as preserved in the Rg-Veda and the adjacent Traditions. A contribution to the decoding of the Indus Script and to the Anthropology of the Ancient Orient ISBN 3-924942-47-1
- 2005, Der Diskus von Phaistos und die Heilige Hochzeit von Theseus und Ariadne : ein Beitrag zur Entschlüsselung der minoischen Hieroglyphen im Vergleich mit der etruskischen und der Indus-Schrift ISBN 3-924942-55-2
  - English: The Disk of Phaistos and the Sacred Marriage of Theseus and Ariadne. A contribution to the decoding of the Minoan hieroglyphs ISBN 3-924942-54-4
- 2005, The Sacred Marriage and the Swastika on Indus Seals and Tablets. A study on the foundations of human culture, ISBN 3-924942-42-0
