= INS Krishna =

INS Krishna or is the name of following ships if the Indian Navy, named for the Krishna river.

- HMIS Kistna, WW2-era Black Swan-class sloop which served in the Royal Indian Navy. renamed INS Krisna post Indian independence.
- INS Krisna (F46), Leander class Frigate purchased as a training vessel by the Indian navy in 1995
- INS Krishna (2026), under construction lead ship of the Krishna-class training ship

== See also ==
- Krishna (disambiguation)
