= Steve Farmer (historian) =

American historian

Steve Farmer is an American historian, noted for his research on Indus script.

In 2000, he called out N. S. Rajaram, charging him of fabricating the Indus valley seals in order to find a meaning in them and claiming the existence of horse in Indus valley civilization. Him, together with Michael Witzel had subsequently made an offer of $1,000 to any researcher of the field who can defend the claims of Rajaram. On Indus script he further noted, "to view the Indus symbols as part of an ‘undeciphered script’ isn't a view anyone outside the highly politicised world of India believes".

During California textbook controversy over Hindu history, he was among the academics who wrote to State Board of Education, California, to oppose proposed changes by Hindu nationalist groups.
