= Krishnaveni =

Krishnaveni or Krishna Veni may refer to:

- Krishna River, the third biggest river in India
- Krishnaveni (actress) (1924–2025), an Indian actress, singer and producer in Telugu cinema
- Krishnaveni (film), an Indian Telugu-language film about the life of a woman suffering from hysteria
- Krishnaveni (TV series), an Indian Telugu-language TV series broadcast by Star Maa
- Jikki Krishnaveni (1935–2004), singer in South Indian films

== See also ==
- Krishna (disambiguation)
