= Michael Witzel =

German-American philologist (born 1943)

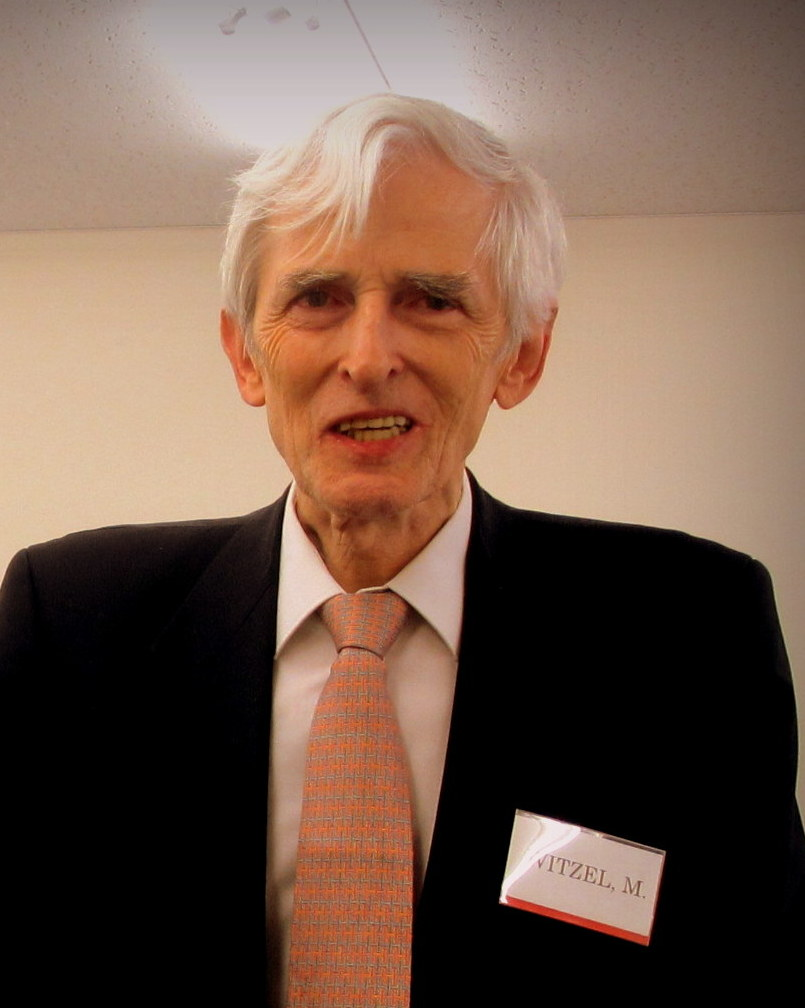
- Born: July 18, 1943 (age 83); Schwiebus, Gau March of Brandenburg, Greater German Reich
- Occupations: Philologist, linguist, Indologist

Academic work
- Institutions: Harvard University
- Website: michaelwitzel.org

Michael Witzel (born July 18, 1943) is a German-American philologist, comparative mythologist and Indologist. Until his retirement, Witzel was the Wales Professor of Sanskrit at Harvard University and the editor of the Harvard Oriental Series (volumes 50–100). He has researched a number of Indian sacred texts, particularly the Vedas.

== Biography ==
Michael Witzel was born on July 18, 1943, in Schwiebus, Germany (modern Świebodzin, Poland). He studied indology in West Germany from 1965 to 1971 under Paul Thieme, H.-P. Schmidt, K. Hoffmann, and J. Narten, as well as in Nepal (1972 to 1973) under Mīmāmsaka Jununath Pandit. From 1972 to 1978, he led the Nepal-German Manuscript Preservation Project and the Nepal Research Centre in Kathmandu.

Witzel has taught at Tübingen (1972), Leiden (1978–1986), and at Harvard (1986~2022), and has been the Wales Research professor since 2022. He has had visiting appointments at Kyoto (twice), Paris (twice), and Tokyo (twice). He has been teaching Sanskrit since 1972.

Witzel is editor-in-chief of the Electronic Journal of Vedic Studies and the Harvard Oriental Series. Witzel has been president of the Association for the Study of Language in Prehistory since 1999, as well as of the International Association for Comparative Mythology since 2006.

He was elected to the American Academy of Arts and Sciences in 2003 and was elected honorary member of the German Oriental Society in 2009. In 2013 he was appointed Cabot fellow of the Faculty of Arts and Sciences at Harvard University, receiving recognition for his book on comparative mythology.

== Philological research ==
The main topics of scholarly research are the dialects of Vedic Sanskrit, old Indian history, the development of Vedic religion, and the linguistic prehistory of the Indian subcontinent.

=== Early works and translations ===
Witzel's early philological work deals with the oldest texts of India, the Vedas, their manuscripts and their traditional recitation; it included some editions and translations of unknown texts (1972). such as the Katha Aranyaka. He has begun, together with T. Goto et al. a new translation of the Rigveda into German (Books I-II, 2007, Books III-V 2012), Books VI-VII (2022).

=== Vedic texts, Indian history, and the emergence of the Kuru kingdom ===
After 1987, he has increasingly focused on the localization of Vedic texts (1987) and the evidence contained in them for early Indian history, notably that of the Rigveda and the following period, represented by the Black Yajurveda Samhitas and the Brahmanas. This work has been done in close collaboration with Harvard archaeologists such as R. Meadow, with whom he has also co-taught. Witzel aims at indicating the emergence of the Kuru Kingdom in the Delhi area (1989, 1995, 1997, 2003), its seminal culture and its political dominance, as well as studying the origin of late Vedic polities and the first Indian empire in eastern North India (1995, 1997, 2003, 2010).

He studied at length the various Vedic recensions (śākhā) and their importance for the geographical spread of Vedic culture across North India and beyond. This resulted in book-length investigations of Vedic dialects (1989), the development of the Vedic canon (1997), and of Old India as such (2003, reprint 2010).

=== Pre-Vedic substrate languages of Northern India ===
The linguistic aspect of earliest Indian history has been explored in a number of papers (1993, 1999, 2000, 2001, 2006, 2009) dealing with the pre-Vedic substrate languages of Northern India. These result in a substantial amount of loan words from a prefixing language ("Para-Munda") similar to but not identical with Austroasiatic (Munda, Khasi, etc.) as well as from other unidentified languages. In addition, a considerable number of Vedic and Old Iranian words are traced back to a Central Asian substrate language (1999, 2003, 2004, 2006). This research is constantly updated, in collaboration with F. Southworth and D. Stampe, by the SARVA project including its South Asian substrate dictionary.

=== Comparative mythology ===
In recent years, he has explored the links between old Indian, Eurasian and other mythologies (1990, 2001–2010) resulting in a new scheme of historical comparative mythology that covers most of Eurasia and the Americas ("Laurasia", cf. the related Harvard, Kyoto, Beijing, Edinburgh, Ravenstein (Netherlands), Tokyo, Strasbourg, St.Petersburg, Tübingen, Yerevan conferences of IACM). This approach has been pursued in a number of papers. A book published in late 2012, The Origins of the World's Mythologies, deals with the newly proposed method of historical comparative mythology at length; (for scholarly criticism see and for periodic updates see) It has been called a magnum opus, which should be taken seriously by social anthropologists, and was praised by professor of Sanskrit Frederick Smith, who wrote that

Witzel's thesis changes the outlook on all other diffusionist models [...] His interdisciplinary approach not only demonstrates that it has a promising future, but that it has arrived and that finally one can actually speak of a science of mythology.

Bruce Lincoln concluded that Witzel in this publication theorizes "in terms of deep prehistory, waves of migration, patterns of diffusion, and contrasts between the styles of thought/narration he associates with two huge aggregates of the world's population [which] strikes me as ill-founded, ill-conceived, unconvincing, and deeply disturbing in its implications."

=== Criticism of "Indigenous Aryans" ===
Witzel published articles criticizing what he calls "spurious interpretations" of Vedic texts and decipherment of Indus inscriptions such as that of N.S. Rajaram. Working with Steven Farmer, Witzel exposed a fabricated horse seal attributed to the Indus Civilization in an attempt to link it with Vedic India.

=== Indus script ===
Witzel has questioned the linguistic nature of the so-called Indus script (Farmer, Sproat, Witzel 2004). Farmer, Sproat, and Witzel presented a number of arguments in support of their thesis that the Indus script is non-linguistic, principal among them being the extreme brevity of the inscriptions, the existence of too many rare signs increasing over the 700-year period of the Mature Harappan civilization, and the lack of random-looking sign repetition typical for representations of actual spoken language (whether syllable-based or letter-based), as seen, for example, in Egyptian cartouches.

Earlier, he had suggested that a substrate related to, but not identical with, the Austro-Asiatic Munda languages, which he, therefore, calls para-Munda, might have been the language of (part of) the Indus population.

Asko Parpola, reviewing the Farmer, Sproat, and Witzel thesis in 2005, states that their arguments "can be easily controverted". He cites the presence of a large number of rare signs in Chinese and emphasizes that there is "little reason for sign repetition in short seal texts written in an early logo-syllabic script". Revisiting the question in a 2007 lecture, Parpola takes on each of the 10 main arguments of Farmer et al., presenting counter arguments. He states that "even short noun phrases and incomplete sentences qualify as full writing if the script uses the rebus principle to phonetize some of its signs". All these points are rejected in a lengthy paper by Richard Sproat, "Corpora and Statistical Analysis of Non-Linguistic Symbol Systems" (2012).

=== Shorter papers ===
Shorter papers provide analyses of important religious (2004) and literary concepts of the period, and its Central Asian antecedents as well as such as the oldest frame story (1986, 1987), prosimetric texts (1997), the Mahabharata (2005), the concept of rebirth (1984), the 'line of progeny' (2000), splitting one's head in discussion (1987), the holy cow (1991), the Milky Way (1984), the asterism of the Seven Rsis (1995, 1999), the sage Yajnavalkya (2003), supposed female Rishis in the Veda (2009,) the persistence of some Vedic beliefs, in modern Hinduism (1989 2002, with cultural historian Steve Farmer and John B. Henderson), as well as some modern Indocentric tendencies (2001-).

Other work (1976-) deals with the traditions of medieval and modern India and Nepal, including its linguistic history, Brahmins, rituals, and kingship (1987) and present day culture, as well as with Old Iran and the Avesta (1972-), including its homeland in Eastern Iran and Afghanistan (2000).

== Conferences ==
Witzel has organized a number of international conferences at Harvard such as the first of the intermittent International Vedic Workshops (1989, 1999, 2004; 2011 at Bucharest, 2014 at Kozhikode, Kerala), the first of several annual International Conferences on Dowry and Bride-Burning in India (1995 sqq.), the yearly Round Tables on the Ethnogenesis of South and Central Asia (1999 sqq) and, since 2005, conferences on comparative mythology (Kyoto, Beijing, Edinburgh, Ravenstein (Netherlands), Tokyo, Harvard, Tokyo). as well as at Strasbourg, St.Petersburg, Tübingen and Yerevan.

At the Beijing conference he founded the International Association for Comparative Mythology.

== California textbook controversy over Hindu history ==
In 2005, Witzel engaged other academics and activist groups to oppose changes to California state school history textbooks proposed by US-based Hindu groups, (Note: Proposed changes included: * presenting the Indus Valley Civilisation as an Aryan or Vedic society, denying the Indo-Aryan migrations; * downplaying "caste and gender-hierarchies in ancient India"; * ignoring the rich diversity of Hindu-traditions and deities, presenting Hinduism as essentially monotheistic, "emphasiz[ing] a Vedic form of Hinduism.") mainly "the Rashtriya Swayamsewak Sangh (RSS)-linked organisations" The Vedic Foundation (VF) and Hindu Education Foundation (HEF).

Witzel and his allies argued that the changes were not of a scholarly but of a religious-political nature, (Note: Meenakshi Ganjoo: "[Witzel] requested the Board of Education to reject the "Hindutva recommended" changes. Witzel wrote to the CBE President, "The proposed revisions are not of a scholarly but of a religious-political nature and are primarily promoted by Hindutva supporters and non-specialist academics writing about issues far outside their area of expertise." About 50 international scholars specializing in Indian history and culture, including Indian historian Romila Thapar and D. N. Jha, endorsed the letter.") reflecting a limited view on Hinduism which excludes non-Vaishna traditions. (Note: Limited view: * Witzel: "The proposed edits come out of a very sectarian approach to history [...] They view all of Hinduism through one narrow lens [...] It's people on the very fringe who want to dispute these points." * Witzel: "California has been hijacked by a saffron agenda, worse by a sectarian saffron agenda. In this case, a strident Vaishnava one that excludes Shaiva, Devi, Tantric, Lingayat and other forms of Hindu worship and Darshana... The new CA [California] history textbooks will reflect that." In a letter to the Board of Education, Vinay Lal, a history professor at the University of California at Los Angeles, wrote: "As far as I am aware, the Hindu Education Foundation and Vedic Foundation and their supporters do not number among their ranks any academic specialists in Indian history or religion other than Professor Bajpai himself. It is a remarkable fact that, in a state which has perhaps the leading public research university system in the United States, these two foundations could not find a single professor of Indian history or religion within the UC system (with its ten campuses) to support their views. Indeed, it would be no exaggeration to say that they would be hard pressed to find a single scholar at any research university in the United States who would support their views.) Parents supportive of the changes said they wanted a "fair representation of their culture," explaining that "the current textbooks make their children ashamed."

Witzel was appointed to an expert panel set up to review the changes, which was opposed by the HEF and the VF, claiming "that Witzel knew little about Hinduism and ancient Indian history," and accusing him of "leftist leanings" and being biased against Hinduism, allegations he rejects. While the expert panel rejected most of the changes, the CBE nevertheless accepted most of them, under pressure of Hindu-organisations. After further protest by scholars of South Asia, the CBE eventually rejected most of the changes proposed by the HEF and VF.

The HEF campaign was dismissed by critics as "one driven by the sectarian agenda of the Sangh Parivar, a term commonly used to describe the Hindu nationalist triumvirate of India's Bharatiya Janata Party, the Rashtriya Swayamsevak Sangh and the Vishwa Hindu Parishad." In a letter to the Board of Education, Vinay Lal, a history professor at the University of California at Los Angeles, wrote:

As far as I am aware, the Hindu Education Foundation and Vedic Foundation and their supporters do not number among their ranks any academic specialists in Indian history or religion other than Professor Bajpai himself. It is a remarkable fact that, in a state which has perhaps the leading public research university system in the United States, these two foundations could not find a single professor of Indian history or religion within the UC system (with its ten campuses) to support their views. Indeed, it would be no exaggeration to say that they would be hard pressed to find a single scholar at any research university in the United States who would support their views.

== Works ==
Witzel's written works include the following:

1. The Origins of the World's Mythologies
2. Textual Criticism in Indology and in the European Philology during the 19th and 20th centuries
3. Inside the texts, Beyond the Texts. New Approaches to the Study of the Vedas,
4. The Home of Aryans
5. Substrate Languages in Old Indo-Aryan
6. Aryan and non-Aryan Names in Vedic India.
7. Which of Us are Aryans? Rethinking the Concepts of Our Origins

== See also ==
- List of indologists

== Sources ==
- Bose, Purnima (Spring 2008). "Hindutva Abroad: The California Textbook Controversy". The Global South. 2 (1): 11–34. doi:10.2979/GSO.2008.2.1.11.
- Ganjoo, Meenakshi (2006). "Re-written history raises intellectual temper in California". Outlook, January 17, 2006. Archived from the original on October 11, 2014.
- Kurien, Prema A. (December 2006). "Multiculturalism and "American" Religion: The Case of Hindu Indian Americans". Social Forces. 85 (2). The University of North Carolina Press: 723–741. doi:10.1353/sof.2007.0015.
- Normand, Vrinda (2006). "Battling the Past". Metroactive.com.
- Rajagopal, Raju (2006). "Now, Multicultural Hindutva". Outlook India.
- Ranganathan, Deepa (2006). "Hindu history ignites brawl over textbooks". Education. sacbee.com. Archived from the original on June 25, 2008.
- Taneja, Nalina (January 14–27, 2006). "A saffron assault abroad". Frontline. 23 (1). Archived from the original on February 20, 2012.
- Visveswaran, K.; Witzel, Michael; Majrekar, Nandini; Bhog, Dipta; Chakravarti, Uma (2009). "Hindutva View of History. Rewriting Textsbook in India and the United States" (PDF). Georgetown Journal of International Affairs: 101–112.
