= Krishnayya =

Krishnayya or Krishnaiah (Teluguaya)

- Samatam Krishnayya, was a poet, historian and ayurvedic doctor.
- N. V. Krishnaiah, was a communist politician from Andhra Pradesh, India.
- R. Krishnaiah or Ryaga Krishnaiah, is a leader of Andhra Pradesh Backward Castes.
- Intlo Ramayya Veedilo Krishnayya is a 1982 Tollywood film.
