= Indus script =

Symbols of the Indus Valley Civilisation

Indus script (Harappan)
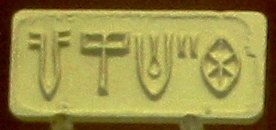
- Seal impression showing a typical inscription of five characters
- Script type: Undeciphered , possibly Bronze Age writing or proto-writing
- Period: c. 2800–1900 BCE (Note: Kenoyer (2006), pp. 10–11: "By around 2800 BC, during the Kot Diji Phase at Harappa, the use of script on seals and inscribed pottery indicates the presence of an Early Indus script.") (possible proto-script from c. 3500 BCE) (Note: Bryant (2001), p. 178: "what appears to be proto‐Indus writing on shards of pottery from the Ravi phase that are as early as 3500 B.C.E.") (rarely, later "graffiti" till c. 1300 BCE)
- Direction: Right-to-left script, boustrophedon
- Languages: Unknown, possibly Harappan language

ISO 15924
- ISO 15924: Inds (610), Indus (Harappan)

The Indus script, also known as the Harappan script and the Indus Valley script, is a corpus of symbols produced by the Indus Valley Civilisation. Most inscriptions containing these symbols are extremely short, making it difficult to judge whether or not they constituted a writing system used to record the Harappan language or languages which are presumed to have been spoken. Despite many attempts, the script has not yet been deciphered. There is no known bilingual inscription to help decipher the script, which shows no significant changes over time. However, there appear to be variations in what might be termed syntax depending upon location.

The first publication of a seal with Harappan symbols dates to 1875, in a drawing by Alexander Cunningham. By 1992, an estimated 4,000 inscribed objects had been discovered, some as far afield as Mesopotamia due to existing Indus–Mesopotamia relations, with over 400 distinct signs represented across known inscriptions.

Some scholars, such as G. R. Hunter, S. R. Rao, John Newberry, and Krishna Rao have argued that the Brahmi script has some connection with the Indus system. Raymond Allchin has somewhat cautiously supported the possibility of the Brahmi script being influenced by the Indus script, but this connection has not been proven. Another possibility for the continuity of the Indus tradition is in the megalithic graffiti symbols of southern and central India and Sri Lanka, which probably do not constitute a linguistic script, but may have some overlap with the Indus symbol inventory. Linguists such as Iravatham Mahadevan, Kamil Zvelebil, and Asko Parpola have argued that the script had a relation to a Dravidian language.

== Corpus ==
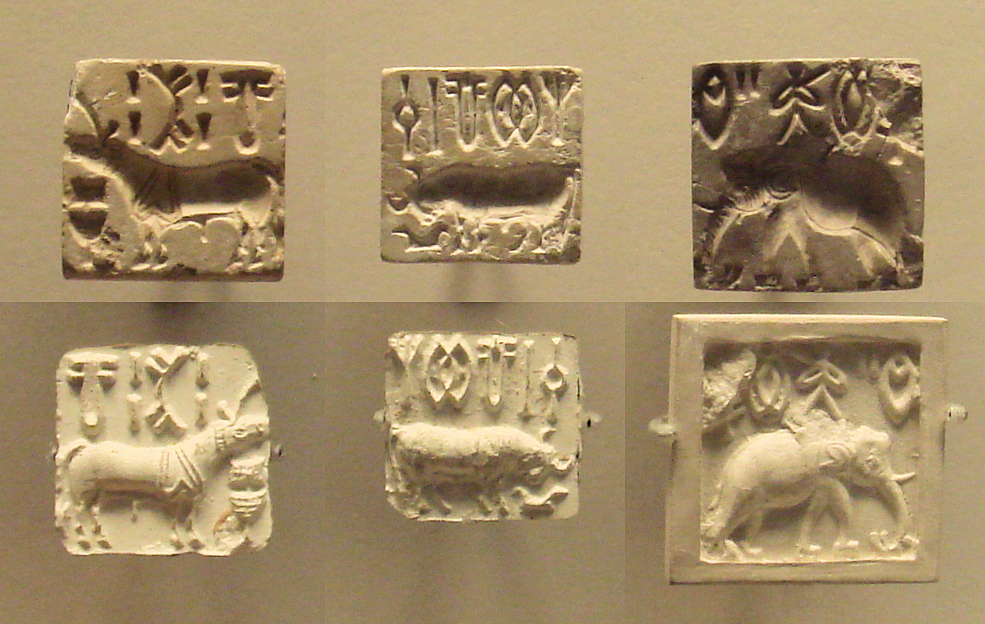
Three stamp seals and their impressions bearing Indus script characters alongside animals: "unicorn" (left), bull (centre), and elephant (right); Guimet Museum, Paris

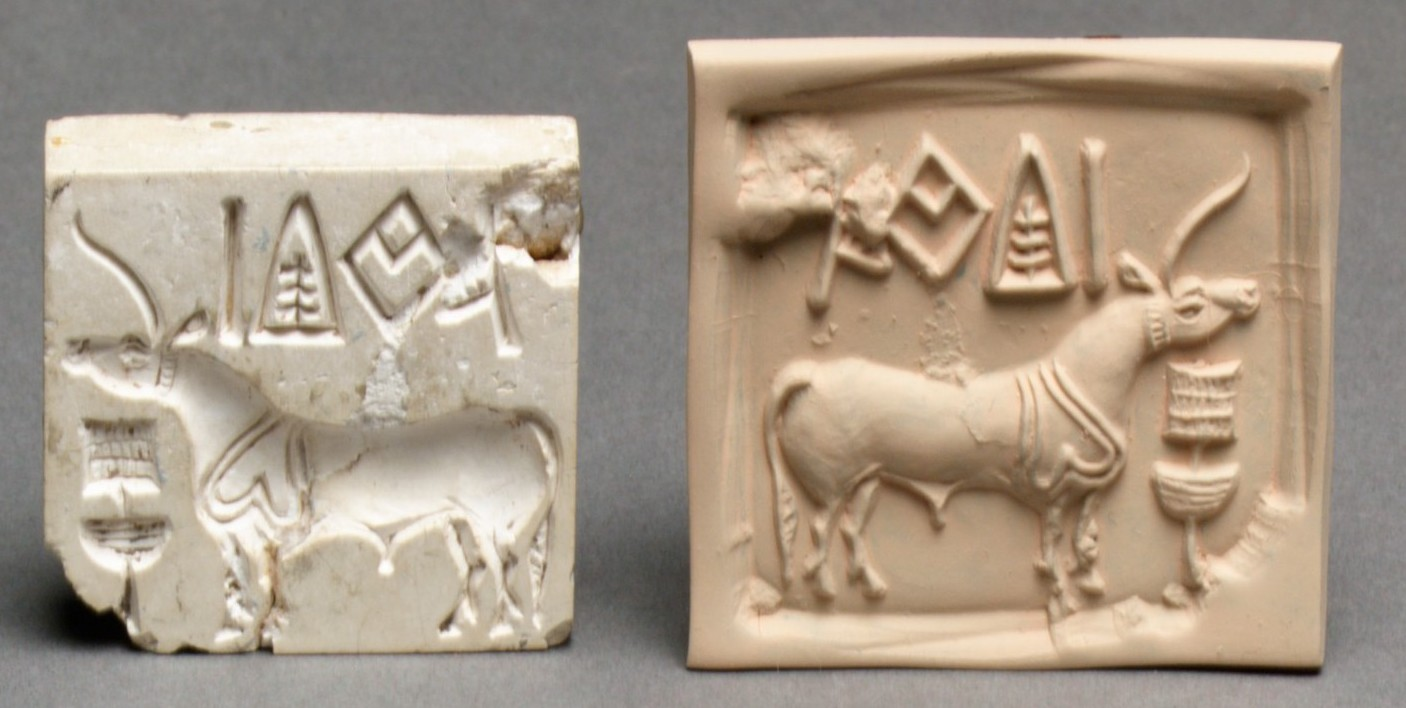
"Unicorn" seal with Indus inscription, and a modern impression; Met Museum

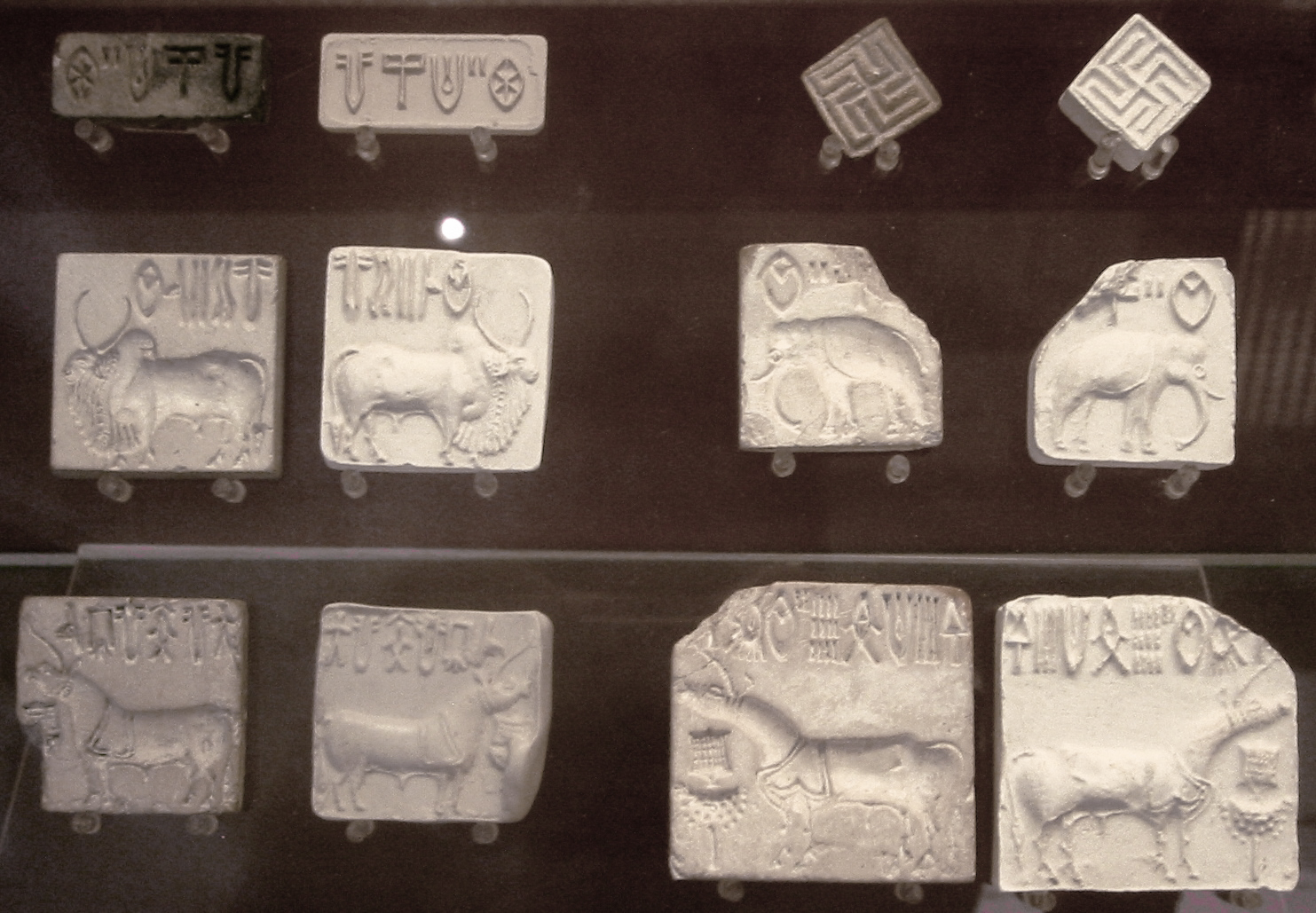
Collection of seals and their impressions; British Museum

By 1977 at least 2,906 inscribed objects with legible inscriptions had been discovered, and by 1992 a total of approximately 4,000 inscribed objects had been found. In 2025, it was reported around 5,000 inscriptions have been excavated since 1924.

Indus script symbols have primarily been found on stamp seals, pottery, bronze and copper plates, tools, and weapons. The majority of the textual corpus consists of seals, impressions of such seals, and graffiti markings inscribed on pottery. Seals and their impressions were typically small in size and portable, with most being just 2–3 centimetres in length on each side. No extant examples of the Indus script have been found on perishable organic materials like papyrus, paper, textiles, leaves, wood, or bark.

=== Early Harappan ===
Early examples of the Indus script have been found on pottery inscriptions and clay impressions of inscribed Harappan seals dating to around c. 2800–2600 BCE during the Early Harappan period, and emerging alongside administrative objects such as seals and standardised weights during the Kot Diji phase of this period. However, excavations at Harappa have demonstrated the development of some symbols from potter's marks and graffiti belonging to the earlier Ravi phase from c. 3500–2800 BCE.

=== Mature Harappan ===
In the Mature Harappan period, from about c. 2600–1900 BCE, strings of Indus signs are commonly found on flat, rectangular stamp seals as well as written or inscribed on a multitude of other objects including pottery, tools, tablets, and ornaments. Signs were written using a variety of methods including carving, chiselling, embossing, and painting applied to diverse materials such as terracotta, sandstone, soapstone, bone, shell, copper, silver, and gold. As of 1977, Iravatham Mahadevan noted that about 90% of the Indus script seals and inscribed objects discovered so far were found at sites in Pakistan along the Indus River and its tributaries, such as Mohenjo-daro and Harappa, (Note: 1540 from Mohenjodaro, 985 from Harappa, 66 from Chanhudaro) while other sites located elsewhere account for the remaining 10%. (Note: 165 from Lothal, 99 from Kalibangan, 7 from Banawali, 6 from Ur in Iraq, 5 from Surkotada, 4 from Chandigarh) Often, animals such as bulls, water buffaloes, elephants, rhinoceros, and the mythical "unicorn" (Note: The commonly depicted "unicorn" is most likely a bull drawn in profile as to obscure one horn behind the other.) accompanied the text on seals, possibly to help the illiterate identify the origin of a particular seal.

=== Late Harappan ===
The Late Harappan period, from c. 1900–1300 BCE, followed the more urbanised Mature Harappan period, and was a period of fragmentation and localisation which preceded the early Iron Age in the Indian subcontinent. Inscriptions have been found at sites associated with the localised phases of this period. At Harappa, the use of the script largely ceased as the use of inscribed seals ended around c. 1900 BCE; however, the use of the Indus script may have endured for a longer duration in other regions such as at Rangpur, Gujarat, particularly in the form of graffiti inscribed on pottery. Seals from the Jhukar phase of the Late Harappan period, centred on the present-day province of Sindh in Pakistan, lack the Indus script, however, some potsherd inscriptions from this phase have been noted. Both seals and potsherds bearing Indus script text, dated c. 2200–1600 BCE, have been found at sites associated with the Daimabad culture of the Late Harappan period, in present-day Maharashtra.

=== Post-Harappan ===
Numerous artefacts, particularly potsherds and tools, bearing markings inscribed into them have been found in Central India, South India, and Sri Lanka dating to the Megalithic Iron Age which followed the Late Harappan period. These markings include inscriptions in the Brahmi and Tamil-Brahmi scripts, but also include non-Brahmi graffiti symbols which co-existed contemporaneously with the Tamil-Brahmi script. As with the Indus script, there is no scholarly consensus on the meaning of these non-Brahmi symbols. Some scholars, such as the anthropologist Gregory Possehl, have argued that the non-Brahmi graffiti symbols are a survival and development of the Indus script into and during the 1st millennium BCE. In 1960, archaeologist B. B. Lal found that a majority (Note: 47 out of 61 signs surveyed.) of the megalithic symbols he had surveyed were identifiably shared with the Indus script, concluding that there was a commonness of culture between the Indus Valley Civilisation and the later Megalithic period. Similarly, Indian epigraphist Iravatham Mahadevan has argued that sequences of Megalithic graffiti symbols have been found in the same order as those on comparable Harappan inscriptions and that this is evidence that language used by the Iron Age people of south India was related to or identical with that of the late Harappans.

== Characteristics ==
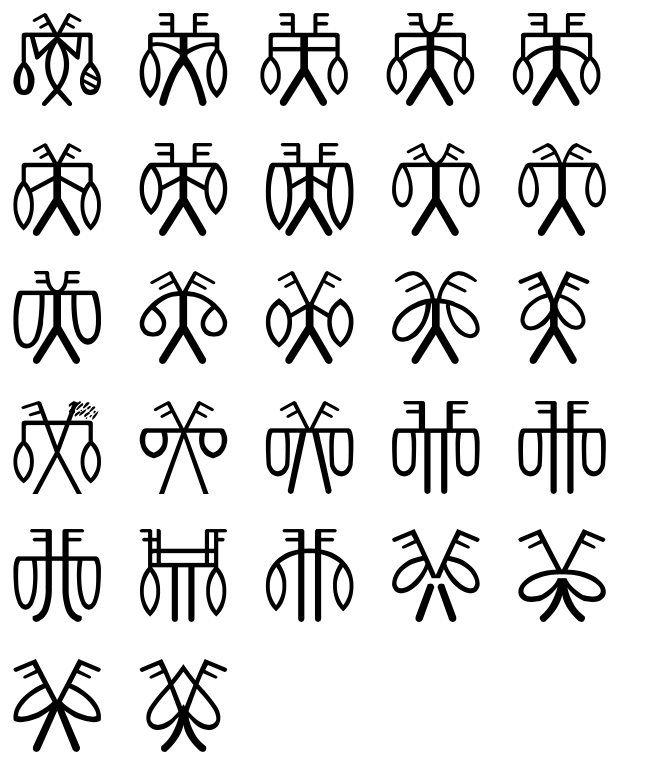
Variations of 'sign 4'; (Note: 'Sign 4' is a compound of 'sign 1', depicting a person carrying two burdens, and 'sign 311', the "jar" sign. Numbering convention for the Indus script by Asko Parpola. For an alternative numbering scheme, refer to Mahadevan (1977).) such variation makes distinguishing signs from allographical variants difficult, and scholars have proposed different ways to classify elements of the Indus script.

The characters are largely pictorial, depicting objects found in the ancient world generally, found locally in Harappan culture, or derived from the natural world. However, many abstract signs have also been identified. Some signs are compounds of simpler pictorial signs, while others are not known to occur in isolation, being known only to occur as components of more complex signs. Some signs resemble tally marks and are often interpreted as early numerals.

=== Number and frequency ===
The number of principal signs is over 400, which is considered too large a number for each character to be a phonogram, and so the script is generally believed to be logo-syllabic. The precise total number of signs is uncertain, as there is disagreement concerning whether particular signs are distinct or variants of the same sign. In the 1970s, the Indian epigrapher Iravatham Mahadevan published a corpus and concordance of Indus inscriptions listing 419 distinct signs in specific patterns. (Note: Mahadevan's 1977 sign list originally included 417 signs but in a late addendum to the list, he added 2 additional signs, identified in then recently discovered inscriptions, which he had not been able to include in the sign list before publishing.) However, in 2015, the archaeologist and epigrapher Bryan Wells estimated that there were around 694 distinct signs.

Of the signs identified by Mahadevan, 113 occur only once (they are hapax legomena), 47 occur only twice, and 59 occur fewer than five times. Just 67 signs account for 80 percent of usage across the corpus of Indus symbols. The most frequently used sign is the "jar" sign, identified by Parpola as 'sign 311'.

=== Writing direction ===
Most scholars agree that the Indus script was generally read from right to left, though some exceptions wherein the script is written left to right or in a boustrophedon mode are also known. Although the script is undeciphered, the writing direction has been deduced from external evidence, such as instances of the symbols being compressed on the left side as if the writer is running out of space at the end of the row. In the case of seals, which create a mirror image impression on the clay or ceramic on which the seal is affixed, the impression of the seal is read from right to left, as is this case with inscriptions in other cases.

=== Relationship to other scripts ===
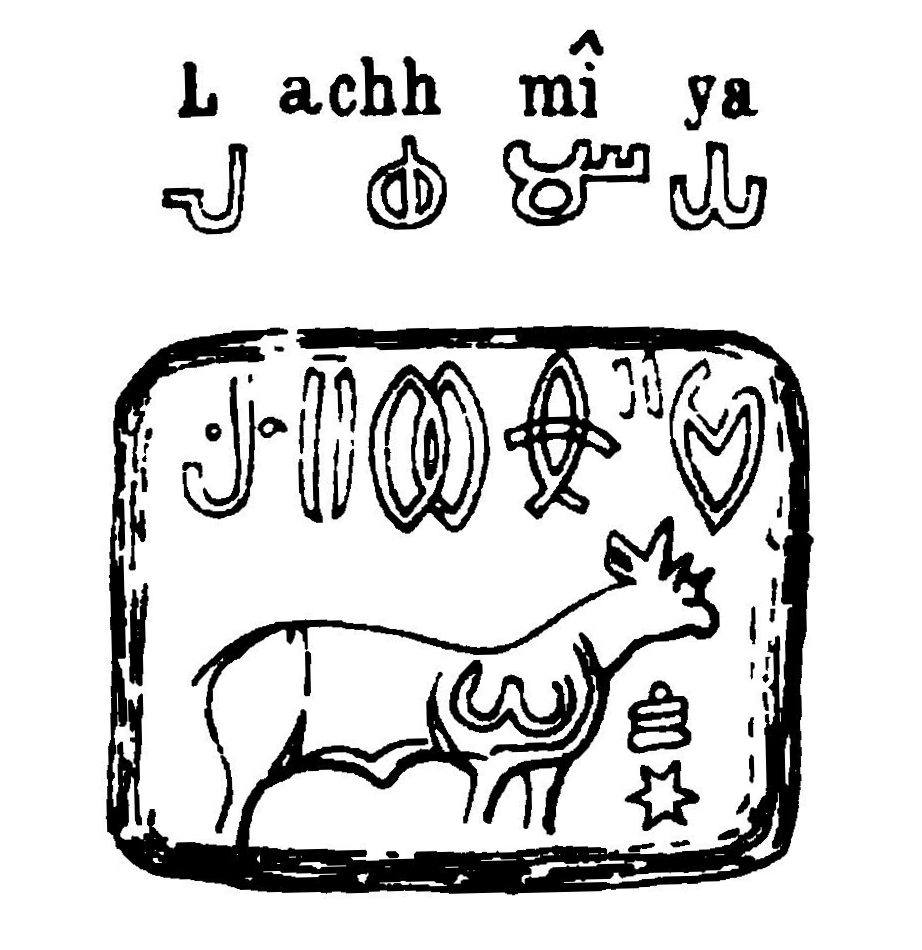
A proposed connection between the Brahmi and Indus scripts, made in the 19th century by Alexander Cunningham, an early proponent for the hypothesis of an indigenous origin of Brahmi

Some researchers have sought to establish a relationship between the Indus script and Brahmi, arguing that it is a substratum or ancestor to later writing systems used in the region of the Indian subcontinent. Others have compared the Indus script to roughly contemporary pictographic scripts from Mesopotamia and the Iranian plateau, particularly Sumerian proto-cuneiform and Elamite scripts. However, researchers now generally agree that the Indus script is not closely related to any other writing systems of the second and third millennia BCE, although some convergence or diffusion with Proto-Elamite conceivably may be found. A definite relationship between the Indus script and any other script remains unproven.

==== Comparisons with Brahmi ====
Researchers have compared the Indus Valley script to the Brahmi and Tamil-Brahmi scripts, suggesting that there may be similarities between them. These similarities were first suggested by early European scholars, such as the archaeologist John Marshall and the Assyriologist Stephen Langdon, with some, such as G. R. Hunter, proposing an indigenous origin of Brahmi with a derivation from the Indus script.

==== Comparisons with Proto-Elamite ====
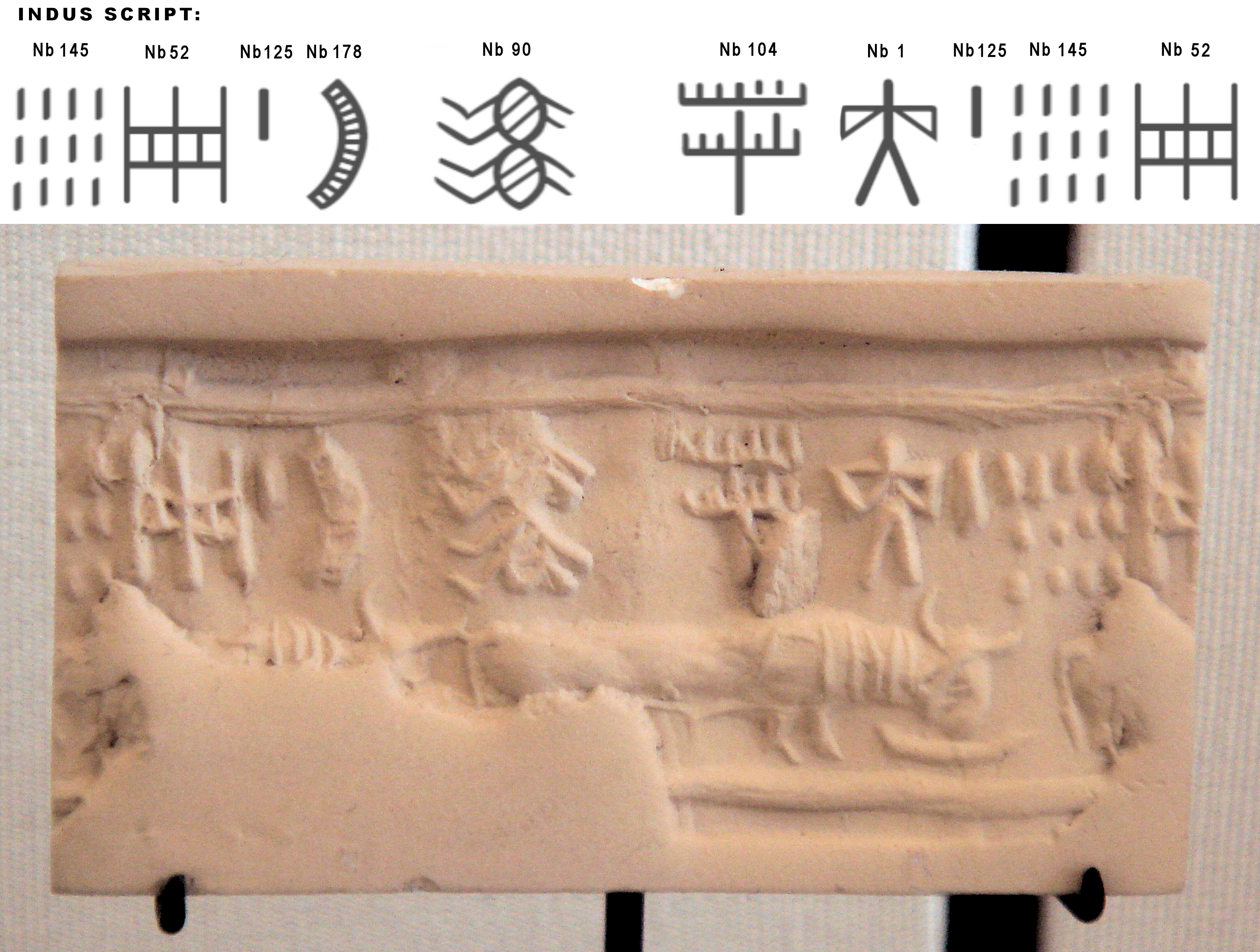
Indus characters (Note: Numbered according to the convention for the Indus script proposed by Asko Parpola.) from an impression of a cylinder seal discovered in Susa (modern Iran), in a stratum dated to 2400–2100 BCE; an example of ancient Indus–Mesopotamia relations.

Researchers have also compared the Indus Valley script with the Proto-Elamite script used in Elam, an ancient Pre-Iranian civilisation that was contemporaneous with the Indus Valley civilisation. Their respective scripts were also contemporaneous, and both were largely pictographic. About 35 Proto-Elamite signs may possibly be comparable to Indus signs. Writing in 1932, G. R. Hunter argued, against the view of Stephen Langdon, that the number of resemblances "seem to be too close to be explained by coincidence".

== Theories and attempts at decipherment ==
=== Decipherability ===
The following factors are usually regarded as the biggest obstacles to successful decipherment:

- Inscriptions are very short. The average length of the inscriptions is around five signs,. Inscriptions vary between just one and seven lines, with single lines being the most common.
- There are doubts whether the Indus script records a written language or is instead a system of non-linguistic signs or proto-writing similar to merchant's marks and house marks, and to the contemporary accounting tokens and numerical clay tablets of Mesopotamia. Due to the brevity of inscriptions, some researchers have questioned whether Indus symbols can even express a spoken language.
- Even when interpreted as written language, it is unknown whether each sign generally represents a whole word, part of a word (such as a morpheme or syllable), or part of a sentence.
- The spoken Harappan language has not been identified, so, assuming the script is a written language, the language the script is most likely to express is unknown. However, an estimated 300 loanwords in the Rigveda may provide evidence of substrate language(s) which may have been spoken in the region of the Indus civilisation. (Note: Witzel (1999) underlines the prefixing nature of these words and calls them Para-Munda, a language related to but not belonging to Proto-Munda.)
- No digraphic or bilingual texts, like the Rosetta Stone, have been found.
- No names, such as those of Indus rulers or personages, are known to be attested in surviving historical records or myths, as was the case with rulers like Rameses and Ptolemy, who were known to hieroglyphic decipherers from records attested in Greek. (Note: (..)ibra, a partial name of a king of Meluhha, a place associated with the Indus Civilisation, is briefly attested in an Akkadian inscription, but no full names are attested.)

Over the years, numerous decipherments have been proposed, but there is no established scholarly consensus. The few points on which there exists scholarly consensus are the right-to-left direction of the majority of the inscriptions, numerical nature of certain stroke-like signs, functional homogeneity of certain terminal signs, and some generally adopted techniques of segmenting the inscriptions into initial, medial, and terminal clusters. Over 100 (mutually exclusive) attempts at decipherment have been published since the 1920s, and the topic is popular among amateur researchers. (Note: For example, see Egbert Richter and N. S. Rajaram.)

In 2025, Tamil Nadu Chief Minister M. K. Stalin announced a $1 million (USD) prize for deciphering the Indus Valley Script, stating that "Archaeologists, Tamil computer software experts and computer experts across the world have been making efforts to decipher the script but it remains a mystery even after 100 years."

=== Dravidian language ===
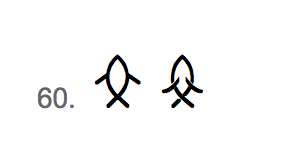
The Indus script 'fish sign', associated with the Dravidian reading mīn, has been interpreted as its homophone, meaning "star", per the rebus principle in the context of some Indus inscriptions

Although no clear consensus has been established, there are those who argue that the Indus script recorded an early form of the Dravidian languages (Proto-Dravidian). Early proponents included the archaeologist Henry Heras, who suggested several readings of signs based on a proto-Dravidian assumption.

Based on computer analysis, the Russian scholar Yuri Knorozov suggested that a Dravidian language is the most likely candidate for the underlying language of the script. The Finnish scholar Asko Parpola led a Finnish team in the 1960s–80s that, like Knorozov's Soviet team, worked toward investigating the inscriptions using computer analysis. Parpola similarly concluded that the Indus script and Harappan language "most likely belonged to the Dravidian family". A comprehensive description of Parpola's work up to 1994 is given in his book Deciphering the Indus Script. Supporting this work, the archaeologist Walter Fairservis argued that Indus script text on seals could be read as names, titles, or occupations, and suggested that the animals depicted were totems indicating kinship or possibly clans. The computational linguist Rajesh P. N. Rao, along with a team of colleagues, performed an independent computational analysis and concluded that the Indus script has the structure of a written language, supporting prior evidence for syntactic structure in the Indus script, and noting that the Indus script appears to have a similar conditional entropy to Old Tamil.

These scholars have proposed readings of many signs; one such reading was legitimised when the Dravidian homophonous words for 'fish' and 'star', mīn, were hinted at through drawings of both the things together on Harappan seals. In a 2011 speech, Rajesh P. N. Rao said that Iravatham Mahadevan and Asko Parpola "have been making some headway on this particular problem", namely deciphering the Indus script, but concluded that their proposed readings, although they make sense, are not yet proof.

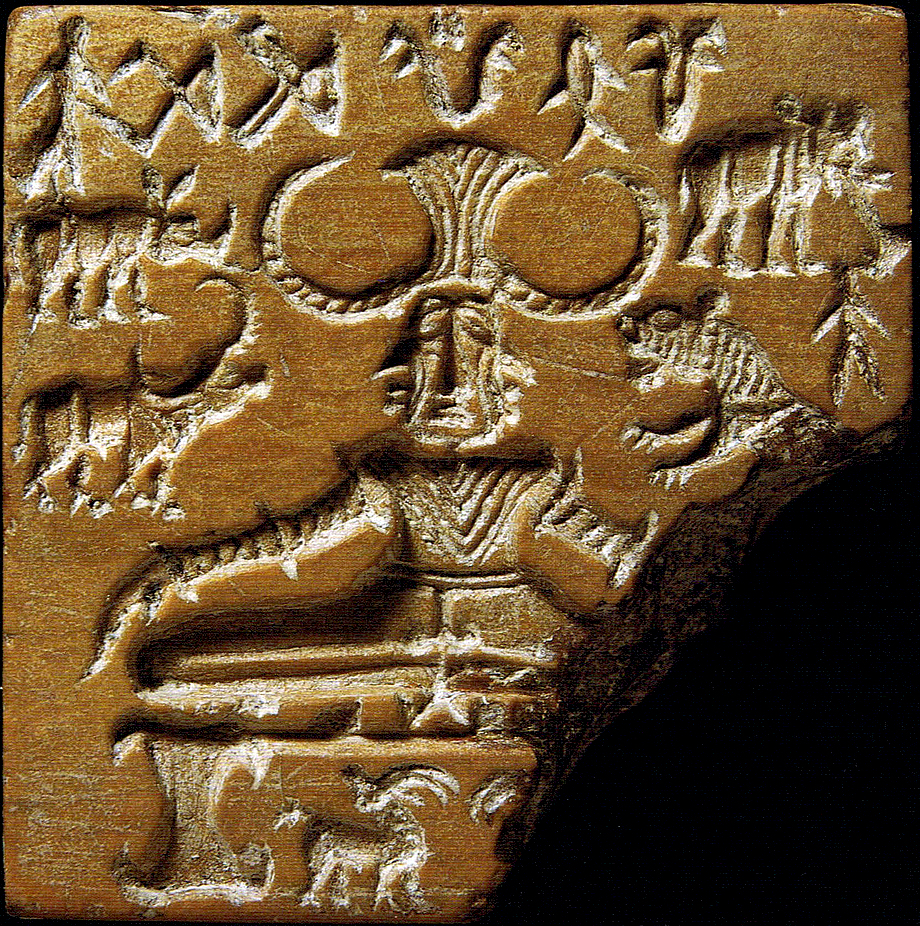
Indus script on a stamp seal depicting a buffalo-horned figure surrounded by animals, dubbed the 'Lord of the Beasts' or 'Paśupati' seal (c. 2350–2000 BCE). (Note: Mahadevan has compared this seal to sign 7, which resembles a human figure with horns, arguing the comparison supports, among other evidence, a suggested Dravidian phonetic reading of the sign, kaṇṭh(a). Numbering convention for the Indus script by Asko Parpola.)

In his 2014 publication Dravidian Proof of the Indus Script via The Rig Veda: A Case Study, the epigraphist Iravatham Mahadevan identified a recurring sequence of four signs which he interpreted as an early Dravidian phrase translated as "Merchant of the City". Commenting on his 2014 publication, he stressed that he had not fully deciphered the Indus script, although he felt his effort had "attained the level of proof" with regard to demonstrating that the Indus script was a Dravidian written language.

=== Non-Dravidian languages ===
==== Indo-Aryan language ====
Perhaps the most influential proponent of the hypothesis that the Indus script records an early Indo-Aryan language is the Indian archaeologist Shikaripura Ranganatha Rao, who in his books, Lothal and the Indus Civilization (1973) and The Decipherment of the Indus Script, wrote that he had deciphered the script. While dismissing most such attempts at decipherment, John E. Mitchiner commented that "a more soundly-based but still greatly subjective and unconvincing attempt to discern an Indo-European basis in the script has been that of Rao". (Note: With reference to Rao (1973), chapter 10.) S. R. Rao perceived a number of similarities in shape and form between the late Harappan characters and the Phoenician letters, and argued that the Phoenician script evolved from the Harappan script, and not, as the classical theory suggests from the Proto-Sinaitic script. He compared it to the Phoenician alphabet, and assigned sound values based on this comparison. Reading the script from left to right, as is the case with Brahmi, he concluded that Indus inscriptions included numerals (Note: Given as aeka, dwi, tra, chatus, panta, happta/sapta, dasa, dvadasa, shata (1, 2, 3, 4, 5, 7, 10, 12, 100)) and were "Sanskritic".

S. R. Rao's interpretation helped to bolster Hindu nationalist and Aryan indigenist views propagated by writers, such as David Frawley, who hold the conviction that Indo-Aryan peoples are the original Bronze Age inhabitants of the Indian subcontinent and that the Indo-European language family originated in India. However, there are many problems with this hypothesis, particularly the cultural differences evident between the Indus River Civilisation and Indo-European cultures, such as the role of horses in the latter; as Parpola put it, "there is no escape from the fact that the horse played a central role in the Vedic and Iranian cultures". Additionally, the Indus script appears to lack evidence of affixes or inflectional endings, which Possehl has argued rules out an Indo-European language such as Sanskrit as the language of the Indus script.

==== Munda language ====
A less popular hypothesis suggests that the Indus script belongs to the Munda family of languages. This language family is spoken largely in central and eastern India, and is related to some Southeast Asian languages. However, much like the Indo-Aryan language, the reconstructed vocabulary of early Munda does not reflect the Harappan culture, therefore, its candidacy for being the language of the Indus Civilisation is dim.

=== Non-linguistic signs ===
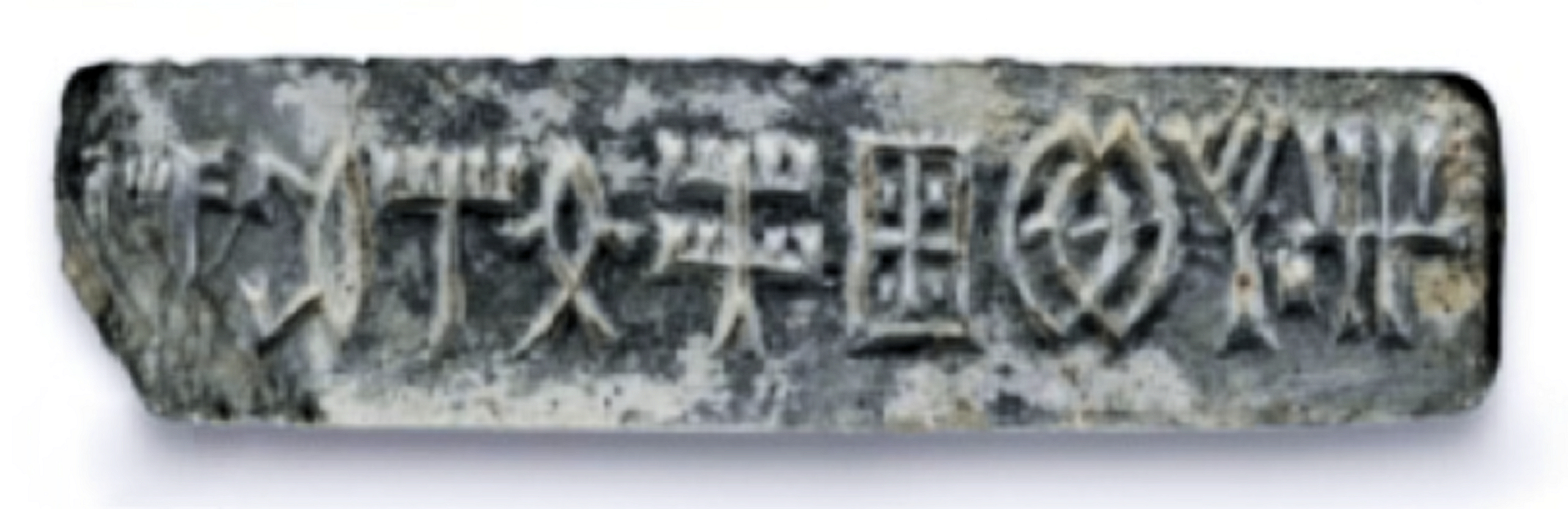
Indus script tablet recovered from Khirasara, Indus Valley

A sequence of Indus characters from the northern gate of Dholavira, dubbed the Dholavira Signboard

An opposing hypothesis is that these symbols are nonlinguistic signs which symbolise families, clans, gods, and religious concepts, and are similar to components of coats of arms or totem poles. In a 2004 article, Steve Farmer, Richard Sproat, and Michael Witzel presented a number of arguments stating that the Indus script is nonlinguistic. The main ones are the extreme brevity of the inscriptions, the existence of too many rare signs (which increase over the 700-year period of the Mature Harappan civilisation), and the lack of the random-looking sign repetition that is typical of language.

Asko Parpola, reviewing the Farmer et al. thesis in 2005, stated that their arguments "can be easily controverted". He cited the presence of a large number of rare signs in Chinese and emphasised there was "little reason for sign repetition in short seal texts written in an early logo-syllabic script". Revisiting the question in a 2008 lecture, Parpola took on each of the 10 main arguments of Farmer et al., presenting counterarguments for each.

A 2009 paper published by Rajesh P. N. Rao, Iravatham Mahadevan, and others in the journal Science also challenged the argument that the Indus script might have been a nonlinguistic symbol system. The paper concluded the conditional entropy of Indus inscriptions closely matched those of linguistic systems like the Sumerian logo-syllabic system, Rig Vedic Sanskrit etc., but they are careful to stress that by itself does not imply the script is linguistic. A follow-up study presented further evidence in terms of entropies of longer sequences of symbols beyond pairs. However, Sproat argued there existed a number of misunderstandings in Rao et al., including a lack of discriminative power in their model, and argued that applying their model to known non-linguistic systems such as Mesopotamian deity symbols produced similar results to the Indus script. Rao et al.'s argument against Sproat's arguments and Sproat's reply were published in Computational Linguistics in December 2010. The June 2014 issue of Language carries a paper by Sproat that provides further evidence that the methodology of Rao et al. is flawed. Rao et al.'s rebuttal of Sproat's 2014 article and Sproat's response are published in the December 2015 issue of Language.

== Unicode ==
Indus Script Font
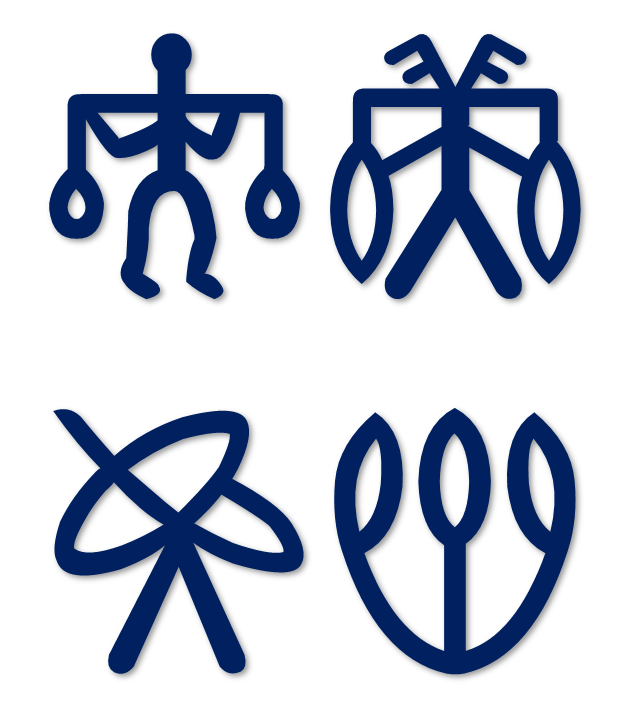
- NFM Indus Script Font
- Designer: National Fund for Mohenjo-daro
- Date created: 2016
- Date released: 2017
- License: Proprietary

The Indus symbols have been assigned the ISO 15924 code "Inds". Michael Everson submitted a completed proposal for encoding the script in Unicode's Supplementary Multilingual Plane in 1999, but this proposal has not been approved by the Unicode Technical Committee. As of February 2022, the Script Encoding Initiative still lists the proposal among the list of scripts that are not yet officially encoded in the Unicode Standard (and ISO/IEC 10646).

The Indus Script Font is a Private Use Areas (PUA) font representing the Indus script. The font was developed based on a corpus compiled by Indologist Asko Parpola in his book Deciphering the Indus Script. Amar Fayaz Buriro, a language engineer, and Shabir Kumbhar, a developer of fonts, were tasked by the National Fund for Mohenjo-daro to develop this font, and they presented it at an international conference on Mohenjo-daro and the Indus Valley Civilisation on 8 February 2017.

== See also ==
- Related topics
  - Early Indian epigraphy
  - Lipi (script)
  - Meluhha
  - Outline of ancient India
  - Sindhology
- History
  - History of ancient numeral systems
  - History of India
  - History of Pakistan
  - History of writing
  - List of languages by first written account
- Other similar topics
  - Anaikoddai seal
  - Edicts of Ashoka
  - Protohistory
  - South Indian Inscriptions
  - Undeciphered writing systems
