= Indradyumna Swami =

American Hindu preacher (born 1949)

Personal life
- Born: Brian Tibbitts; May 20, 1949 (age 77) Palo Alto, California
- Website: https://www.indradyumnaswami.com

Religious life
- Religion: Gaudiya Vaishnavism
- Initiation: Diksa–1971, Sannyasa–1979

Senior posting
- Teacher: AC Bhaktivedanta Swami Srila Prabhupada
- Post: ISKCON Guru, Sannyasi

Indradyumna Swami (IAST: Indra-dyumna Svāmī) is an initiating guru in the International Society for Krishna Consciousness (also known as ISKCON or the Hare Krishna movement), which belongs to the Gaudiya-Vaishnava sampradaya. He is a disciple of His Divine Grace A.C. Bhaktivedanta Swami Prabhupada (Srila Prabhupada) who introduced the Gaudiya Vaisnava, or Bhakti Yoga, tradition to the western world and formalized its spread by founding ISKCON in 1966.

Indradyumna Swami travels around the world, spreading Krishna consciousness through lectures and large-scale kirtan and festival events. He shares his experiences and realizations as a traveling monk through his ongoing diary series (The Diary of a Traveling Monk), long-standing video lecture series, extensive photography stemming from his preaching tours and travels to sacred pilgrimage sites in India, and other books written by him or based on his lectures.

== Early years ==
Indradyumna Swami was born as Brian Tibbitts on May 20, 1949, in Palo Alto, California. As a young man, he enlisted in the United States Marine Corps, thinking that helping to stop the spread of communism in Vietnam would bring about greater peace in the world. However, he was honorably discharged as a conscientious objector just a year later when he realized he did not believe in the war. Shortly thereafter, in 1970, he met members of ISKCON in Detroit, Michigan and moved into the local temple, joining its efforts to spread Krishna consciousness and distribute books written by his soon-to-be guru. In December 1971 he was formally initiated by A.C. Bhaktivedanta Swami Prabhupada, the Founder-Acharya of ISKCON, and given the name Indradyumna Dasa.

== Worldwide Travels and Festival Programs ==
Indradyumna Swami left the United States in 1972, journeying to Europe where he helped open new Bhakti Yoga centers and temples in France, Italy, Switzerland, and Belgium. In 1979, when he was 29, he took a vow of lifelong dedication to missionary activities as a celibate monk, entering the renounced order of sannyasa as Indradyumna Swami. In the early 1980s he served as the temple president at the New Mayapur château temple and farm near Châteauroux in France.

Taking to heart the direct instruction he received from his guru, A.C. Bhaktivedanta Swami Prabhupada, to "preach boldly and have faith in the holy names," Indradyumna Swami has circled the globe over 35 times in spreading Krishna consciousness, traveling to countries such as Russia, Mongolia, Siberia, and China, among many others. He is especially known for his large-scale festival programs, such as his annual Festival of India tour in Poland, the annual U.S.-based Sadhu Sanga Kirtan retreat (which attracts around 2,000 attendees each year), and the Rishikesh Kirtan Fest, a kirtan and spiritual culture event dedicated to introducing the many yoga practitioners who gather in Rishikesh to the spiritual tenets and practices of Bhakti Yoga.

In 1990, Indradyumna Swami coordinated the very first annual Festival of India tour in Poland. The festivals seek to introduce people to the ancient spiritual culture surrounding Bhakti Yoga through a feast of entertainment and education involving presentations and lectures on sacred texts such as the Bhagavad-gita, classical Indian dance performances and theatrical performances based on stories from the Vedic and Vaisnava canon of literature, graphic exhibits, stalls showcasing books written by Srila Prabhupada, and distribution of vegetarian sanctified food, or prasadam. The events are attended by between 5,000 and 10,000 people at a time. Since its founding, the "Festival of India" tour has traveled to ten countries spanning six continents.

Since 1996, Indradyumna Swami and the Polish Festival of India team have participated in the Przystanek Woodstock free music festival organized over the first weekend in August each year by Great Orchestra of Christmas Charity. Dubbed Europe's largest annual open-air event, Przystanek Woodstock has been attended by over a million people in recent years. Within this busy setting, Indradyumna Swami and the Festival of India team of more than 500 volunteers set up a spiritual sanctuary called "Krishna's Village of Peace".

Since 2021, concerned with the preservation of the Gaudiya Vaisnava canon, Indradyumna Swami has undertaken the responsibility of helping to restore and maintain the sacred scriptures found in the Vrindavan Research Institute, which houses more than 32,000 Gaudiya Vaisnava scriptures, including many original writings of important early Gaudiya Vaisnava writers and thinkers, such as Srila Rupa Goswami, Srila Jiva Goswami, Srila Sanatana Goswami and Srila Narottam das Thakur.

Indradyumna Swami currently acts as a spiritual guide for hundreds of thousands of people in the world including his disciples, followers, and well-wishers. When he is not managing festivals, writing, and lecturing, he interfaces with many spiritual and political leaders, including the Dalai Lama, the King of the Zulu Nation and the late Nelson Mandela. He spends the rest of his time traveling to various holy places in India and residing in the holy land of Vrindavan. His annual Kartika parikrama event, which involves visiting many different holy sites within Vrindavan during the sacred month of Kartika, draws hundreds of Bhakti Yoga practitioners each year, who then immerse themselves in kirtana (congregational chanting of the holy names of Krishna) and lectures on the spiritual significance of the sacred places visited.

== Writings and Lectures ==
Indradyumna Swami has been writing his well-known Diary of a Traveling Monk series since 1995.

To reach an ever-larger audience, in 2020, Indradyumna Swami began a weekly YouTube lecture series focusing on Sri Vrindavan Dhama, the sacred abode of Lord Krishna, located in the Mathura district of Uttar Pradesh, India. A new and ongoing book series entitled, The Traveling Monk In Sacred Places, is based on this lecture series.

== Books ==
=== Diary of a Traveling Monk, ongoing series ===
- Diary of a Traveling Preacher, Vol. I & II (May 1995 – November 1996); Torchlight Publishing. — 296 p.
- Diary of a Traveling Preacher, Vol. III (January 2001 – September 2001); Torchlight Publishing. — 251 p.
- Diary of a Traveling Preacher, Vol. IV (September 16, 2001 – April 19, 2003); Torchlight Publishing. — 183 p.
- Diary of a Traveling Preacher, Vol. V (May 2003 – November 2004); Torchlight Publishing. — 210 p.
- Diary of a Traveling Preacher, Vol. VI (November 2004 – December 2005); Torchlight Publishing. — 221 p.
- Diary of a Traveling Preacher, Vol. VII (January 2006 – November 2006); Torchlight Publishing. — 204 p.
- Diary of a Traveling Preacher, Vol. VIII (January 2007– January 2008); Torchlight Publishing. — 158 p.
- Diary of a Traveling Preacher, Vol. IX (January 2008 – November 2008); Torchlight Publishing. — 149 p.
- Diary of a Traveling Monk, Vol. X (November 2008 – October 2009); Torchlight Publishing. — 152 p.
- Diary of a Traveling Monk, Vol. XI (November 2009 – March 2012); Torchlight Publishing. — 161 p.
- Diary of a Traveling Monk, Vol. XII (October 2011-March 2012); online only
- Diary of a Traveling Monk, Vol. XIII (August 2012-December 2013); online only
- Diary of a Traveling Monk, Vol. XIV (February 2014-November 2018); online only
- Diary of a Traveling Monk, Vol. XV (February 2019-August 2022); online only

=== The Traveling Monk in Sacred Places, ongoing series ===
- Govardhana; Publisher: Thomson Press (2019) — 261 p.
- The Sacred Forests of Vrindavan: Western Bank of the Yamuna; Publisher: Thomson Press (2023) — 247 p.

=== Other works ===
- Vraja Lila; Publisher: Torchlight Publishing (1994) — 96 p.
- Daso 'Smi - I Am Your Servant (1994)
- Drums Along the Amazon; Publisher: Torchlight Publishing (2019), ISBN 978-1-937731-31-1
