= Krishna Rao (archaeologist) =

Indian archaeologist and writer (born 1930)

Krishna Rao is an Indian archaeologist and writer born in 1930.

He received his master's degree from Andhra University in 1953, and a postgraduate degree in archaeology in 1967 from the Archaeological Survey of India. For a time, he was in charge of the Amaravathi Museum in Andhra Pradesh, India.

== Published works ==
Indus Script Deciphered (1982) was published by Agam Kala Prakashan, Delhi, India.

In this book, Rao noted similarities between Sumerian pre-cuneiform writing, and Indus script, and proposed that Indus script encoded Sanskrit and a number of other languages. Rao theorized that Indus script consisted of ideograms and syllable signs, rather than being a pure syllabary like Brahmi script.
