= Kishen Narsi =

- Born: Kishen Mangaldas Narsi; 1939 (age 86–87); Mumbai
- Occupation: Boxing referee

Kishen Mangaldas Narsi (born 1939) is an International Referee and vice-chairman of the executive committee of the International Boxing Association (AIBA) who has officiated in three Olympics. He has been appointed an International Technical Official by the AIBA for the forthcoming London Olympics.

== Early life ==
Narsi went to St. Xavier's College, Mumbai and was the Sports Captain of the college. He has also captained the boxing team of the University of Mumbai and turned out for Bombay Gymkhana in hockey. Apart from sports, he is a marketing professional.

== Career ==
He was an official for boxing at the Asian Games – Bangkok (1978), Delhi (1982), and a Referee and Judge at the Olympics – Los Angeles (1984), Seoul (1988) and Barcelona (1992), besides the Commonwealth Games, the Asian and the World Boxing Championships.

== Honours ==
- AIBA's Best Technical Delegate of the Year (2009).
