= Krishnarao Jaisim =

Krishnarao Jaisim is an architect and the former chairman of the Indian Institute of Architects, Karnataka Chapter. His work has been featured in The New York Times, The Hindu, The Times of India, The Deccan Herald, and on HGTV.

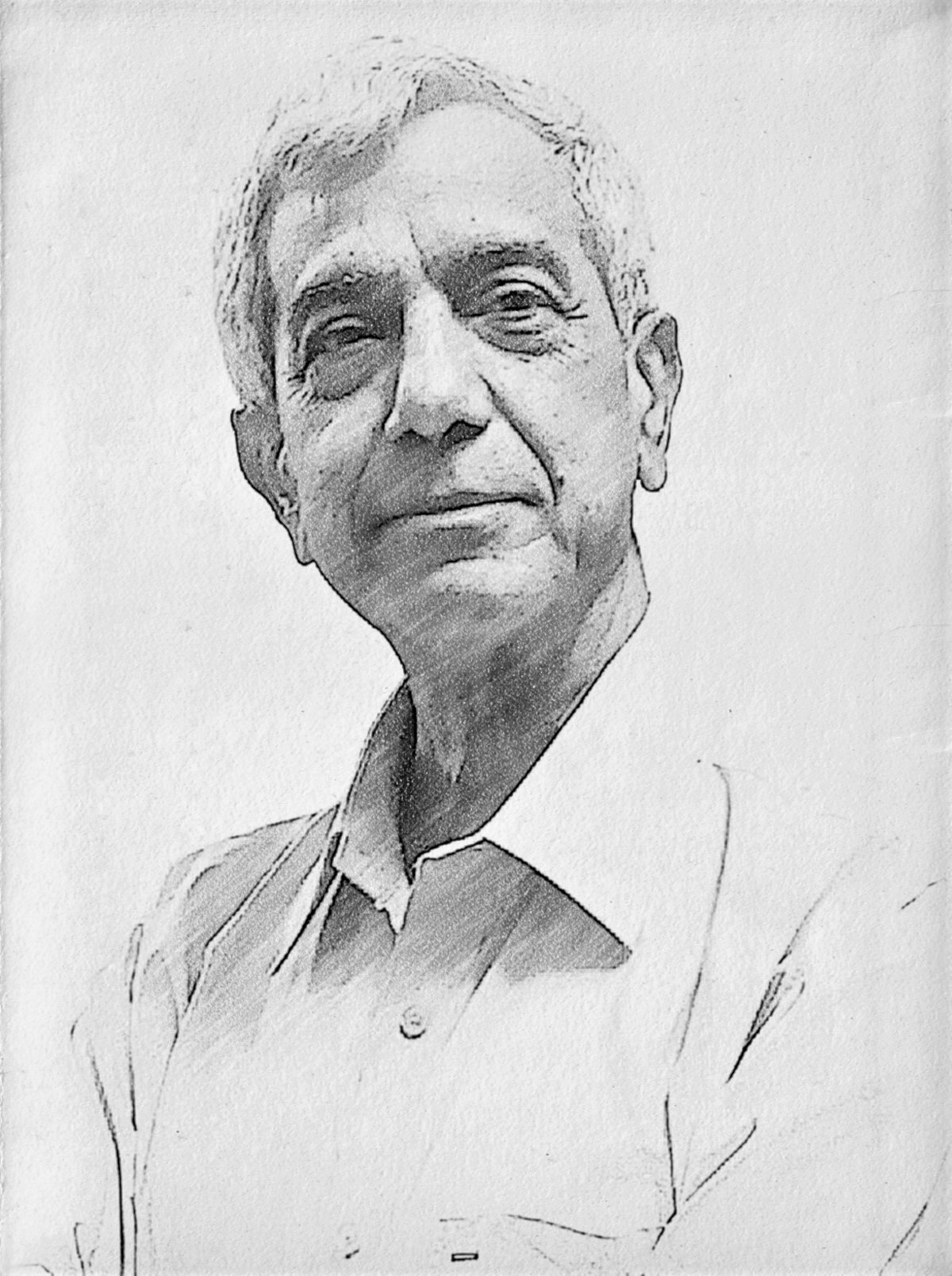
Krishnarao Jaisim.

== Career ==
Jaisim attended Madras Christian College School (1960 batch). He completed his university education in architecture in 1966, from Madras University. From 1966 to 1970, he worked with the architectural firm of LM Chitale & Son, Madras.

In 1970, inspired by Ayn Rand's novel, The Fountainhead, he started an architecture practice under the name "Jaisim-Fountainhead". The practice grew from 1970 to 1975, winning a National Competition for the Cochin Stadia, Presidents Nomination for the Small Industries Pavilion and the ‘TAJ Fisherman’s Cove’. From 1975 to 1980, the firm began working overseas, and ventured into other areas of building, such as the import and distribution of building materials, running scheduled contracts, and running a stone crusher and fabrication unit. In 1980 he returned to India and settled in Bangalore.

== Personal life ==
Jaisim was married 1970 to Geeta (now President of University Women's Association). He has a daughter, Ashwini Jaisim.

== Awards and positions ==
Chairman's Award - one of the prestigious awards (only two other have relieved this before) CIVIL AWARD - for contribution by an Architect to Civil and Structural Engineering in the built environment for innovative practices.

- J K Award– Architect of the Year 1992
- Outstanding Contribution to the Interior Architecture – Durian Society Interiors Design Award 2004
- International Gold Star Millennium Award –2007 – International conference on Indo – Nepal Friendship & Economic Co-operation at Kathmandu
- Life Time Achievement Award 2007 for Outstanding Performance in the field of Architecture awarded by PAA
- Convener the Indian Institute of Architects – National Convention in Bangalore
- Convener – Workshop on Innovative, Cost & Energy Effective Construction Methods and Systems
- Chairman - Indian Institute of Architects – Karnataka chapter
- Fellow - United Writer's Association
- Fellow - Indian society of lighting engineers
- Fellow – The Indian Institution of Valuers, India
- Registered - Council of Architecture
- Charter President – Rotary Club – Cubbon Park
- Past President – Practicing Architects Association
- Member (Treasurer) - Board of Governors –INSTRUCT
- Professor (Design chair) – BMS College – Dept. of Architecture
- Visiting Professor to Colleges of Architecture
- Adjunct Professor – M.I.T
