= Krushna =

Krushna is a Hindic name, a variant of Krishna. It may refer to the following notable people:

- Krushna Abhishek (born 1983), Indian film actor and comedian
- Krushna Chandra Gajapati (1892–1974), Indian politician
- Krushna Chandra Kar (1907–1995), Indian poet and literary critic
- Krushna Ghoda (1953–2015), Indian politician
