= Asko Parpola =

Finnish Indologist (born 1941)

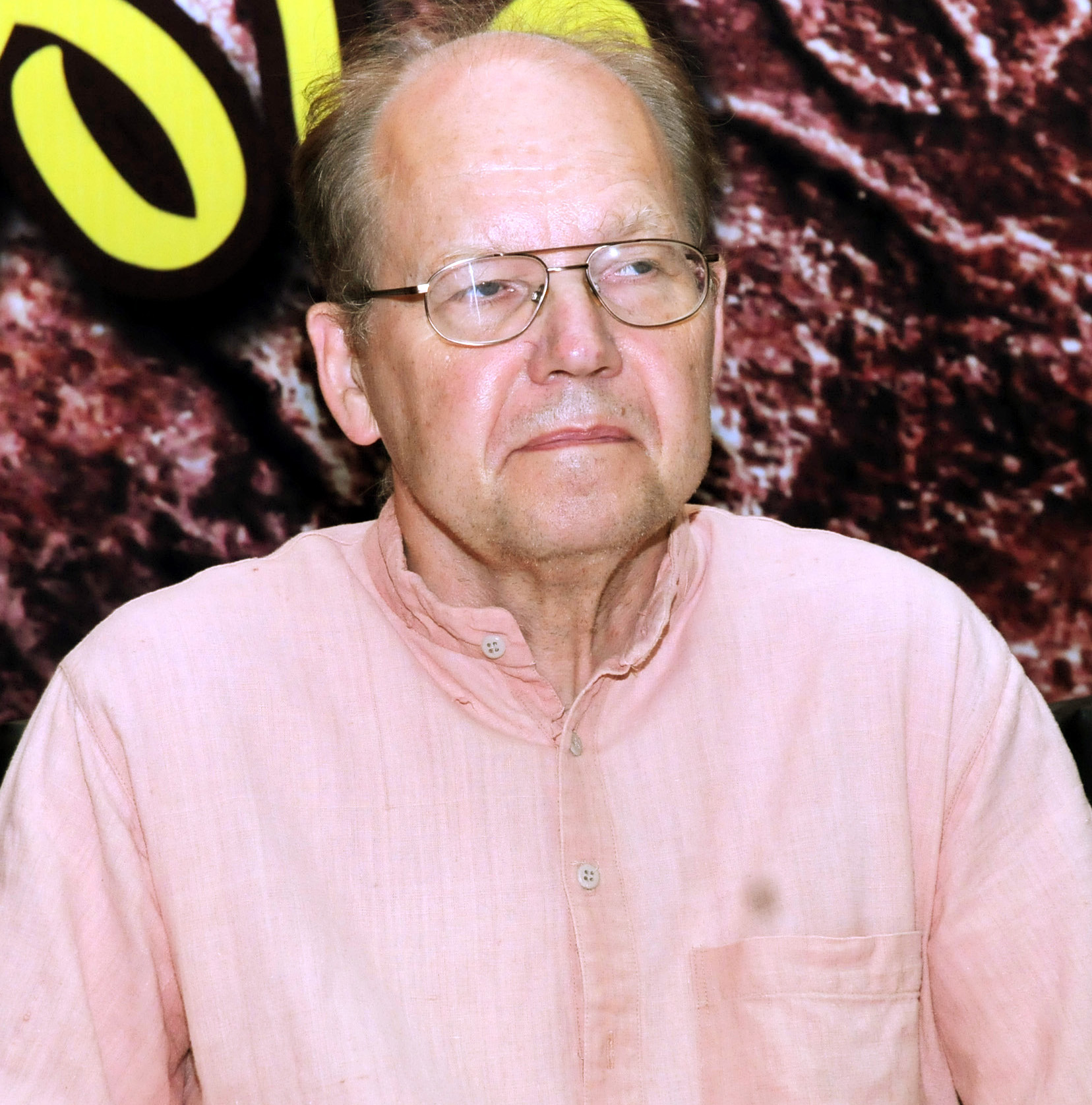
- Parpola at the World Classical Tamil Conference 2010
- Born: July 12, 1941 (age 85); Forssa, Kanta-Häme, Finland
- Occupation: Indologist
- Spouse: Marjatta Parpola
- Relatives: Simo Parpola (brother); Armas Salonen (maternal uncle); K. E. Salonen (maternal grandfather)

Asko Heikki Siegfried Parpola (born 12 July 1941, in Forssa) is a Finnish Indologist, current Professor Emeritus of Indology at the University of Helsinki. He specializes in the Indus Valley Civilization, specifically the study of the Indus script.

== Biography ==
Parpola is a brother of the Akkadian language epigrapher Simo Parpola. He is married to Marjatta Parpola, who has authored a study on the traditions of Kerala's Nambudiri Brahmins.

== Scholarship ==
Parpola's research and teaching interests fall within the following topics:

- Indus Civilization / Indus script and religion / Corpus of Indus Seals and Inscriptions
- Veda / Vedic ritual / Samaveda / Jaiminiya Samaveda texts and rituals / Purva-Mimamsa
- South Asian religions / Hinduism / Saiva and Sakta tradition / Goddess Durga
- South India / Kerala / Tamil Nadu / Karnataka
- Sanskrit / Malayalam / Kannada / Tamil / Prehistory of Indian languages
- Prehistoric archaeology of South Asia and (in broad sense) Central Asia / Coming of the Aryans

Two significant contributions of Parpola, to the field of decipherment of the Indus script, are the creation of the now universally used classification of Indus valley seals, and the proposed, and much-debated, decipherment of the language of the script.

=== Dravidian hypothesis ===
According to Parpola the Indus script and Harappan language are "most likely to have belonged to the Dravidian family". Parpola led a Finnish team in the 1960s–80s that vied with Knorozov's Soviet team in investigating the inscriptions using computer analysis. Based on a proto-Dravidian assumption, they proposed readings of many signs, some agreeing with the suggested readings of Heras and Knorozov (such as equating the "fish" sign with the Dravidian word for fish "min") but disagreeing on several other readings. A comprehensive description of Parpola's work until 1994 is given in his book Deciphering the Indus Script. He states in his book that the Brahui people of Pakistan are remnants of the Harappan culture.

== Publications ==
Books

- 1980: Från Indusreligion till Veda. Studier i de äldsta indiska religionerna, Copenhagen: Akademisk Forlag.
- 1985: The Sky-Garment: A study of the Harappan religion and its relation to the Mesopotamian and later Indian religions. Helsinki: The Finnish Oriental Society.
- 1994: Deciphering the Indus Script, Cambridge University Press, ISBN 9780521430791
- 1994: Sanskritin peruskurssi, Helsinki: Suomen Itämainen Seura (3rd edn. 2003).
- 2005: Intian kulttuuri, Keuruu: Otava.
- 2015: The Roots of Hinduism: The Early Aryans and the Indus Civilization, Oxford University Press, ISBN 978-0-19-022692-3

Selected articles

- 1988: ‘The coming of the Aryans to Iran and India and the cultural and ethnic identity of the Dāsas’, Studia Orientalia, vol. 64, pp. 195–302. The Finnish Oriental Society.
- 1995: ‘The problem of the Aryans and the Soma: Textual-linguistic and archaeological evidence’, in The Indo-Aryans of Ancient South Asia: Language, Material Culture and Ethnicity. Ed. George Erdosy. Berlin/NY: Walter de Gruyter, 1995, pp. 353–81.
- 1998: ‘Aryan languages, archaeological cultures, and Sinkiang: where did Proto-Iranian come into being and how did it spread?’, in The Bronze Age and Early Iron Age Peoples of Eastern Central Asia, vol. 1: Archeology, migration and nomadism, linguistics, ed. Victor H. Mair. Washington, D.C.: Institute for the Study of Man, pp. 114–47.
- 1999: ‘The formation of the Aryan branch of Indo-European’, in Archaeology and Language III: Artefacts, Languages and Texts, eds. Roger Blench & Matthew Spriggs, London/NY: Routledge, pp. 180–210.
- 2002: ‘From the dialects of Old Indo-Aryan to Proto-Indo-Aryan and Proto-Iranian’, in Indo-Iranian Languages and Peoples, Oxford University Press, pp. 43–102.
- 2004: ‘The Nâsatyas, the chariot and Proto-Aryan religion’, Journal of Indological Studies, vol. 2004-2005, n. 16–17, pp. 1–63.
- 2005: ‘Study of the Indus script’, Transactions of the International Conference of Eastern Studies, vol. 50, pp. 28–66. Tokyo: Toho Gakkai.
- 2008: ‘Is the Indus script indeed not a writing system?’, in Airāvati: Felicitation volume in honour of Iravatham Mahadevan, Chennai: Varalaaru, pp. 111–31.
- 2012: ‘Formation of the Indo-European and Uralic (Finno-Ugric) language families in the light of archaeology: Revised and integrated “total” correlations’, A linguistic map of prehistoric northern Europe, vol. 266, pp. 119–84.
- 2017: with Christian Carpelan, ‘On the emergence, contacts and dispersal of Proto-Indo-European, Proto-Uralic and Proto-Aryan in an archaeological perspective’, in Language and Prehistory of the Indo-European Peoples: A Cross-Disciplinary Perspective, Museum Tusculanums Forlag, pp. 77–87.

=== Reception ===
Parpola's long journal article The Coming of the Aryans is widely cited by historians and scholars of Indo-European Studies. Colin Renfrew, who has reviewed the article, called it a "richly annotated and well-illustrated essay," which brings together a number of different lines of arguments, including literary and archaeological. It contains rich and interesting insights into a variety of topics, including the "amalgamation of the Aryan and Dasa religions," and the Nuristani language. However, Renfrew found Parpola's methodology wanting because, to him, it did not clearly lay out the structure of the argument and the underlying assumptions. He listed the underlying assumptions as the one that the Aryans considered themselves immigrants in the lands described in their texts and the one that the Dasas were themselves immigration populations. He considered both these propositions to be doubtful. (Note: Renfrew himself had suggested that Indo-European speakers had migrated from Anatolia to Baluchistan in 6000 BC, bringing the techniques of agriculture to the Indian subcontinent.)

== Awards ==
Asko Parpola received the Kalaignar M. Karunanidhi Classical Tamil Award for 2009 on June 23, 2010, at the World Classical Tamil Conference at Coimbatore. In 2015, he was awarded India's Presidential Award of Certificate of Honour in Sanskrit.

He is an honorary member of the American Oriental Society and, since 1990, a member of the Finnish Academy of Science and Letters.
