= List of Iyers =

This is a list of Iyers. Iyers are Hindu Brahmins of Tamil origin who are Smarthas or followers of the Smritis. They mostly believe in the Advaita philosophy propounded by Adi Sankara.

Prior to the 1800s, almost all prominent members of this community hailed from religious or literary spheres. Syama Sastri and Muthuswamy Dīkshitar, who are part of the "Trinity of Carnatic music" were probably the first verified historical personages from the community, as the accounts or biographies of those who lived earlier appear semi-legendary in character. During the British Raj, Iyers and Iyengars dominated the services by their predominance in the legal and administrative professions. Most of the Dewans of the princely state of Travancore during the 19th century were Tamil Brahmins (Iyers and Iyengars). Some of the prominent individuals of the period as Seshayya Sastri, Sir T. Muthuswamy Iyer, Sir P. S. Sivaswami Iyer, Shungrasoobyer, Sir K. Seshadri Iyer, Sir S. Subramania Iyer and C. P. Ramaswamy Ayyar all had a legal background. At the same time, they were also intimately associated with the Indian National Congress and the Indian independence movement. The most prominent freedom fighter from the community was Subrahmanya Bharati. Following independence, Iyers have diversified into a number of fields dominating the domain of classical arts in particular.

== Saints, religious and spiritual leaders ==
- Abirami Pattar (c. 18th century AD), Tamil saint and poet. Author of Abirami Anthathi and Hindu religious works in Tamil.
- Appayya Dikshita (1520–1593), Saivite saint and religious scholar who re-established Advaita philosophy's predominance in the South.
- Bharati Krishna Tirtha (1884–1960), the Shankaracharya of Puri. He also popularized Vedic mathematics.
- Sambandar (c. 7th century AD), One of the 63 Nayanmars. One of the authors of Tirumurai.
- Chandeshvara Nayanar, one of the 63 Nayanmars.
- Chandrashekarendra Saraswati (1894–1994), former pontiff of the Kanchi Mutt.
- Sundarar (c. 8th century AD), One of the Nayanmars and author of the Periya Puranam.
- Jayendra Saraswathi (1935-2018), former pontiff of the Kanchi mutt.
- Manikkavacakar (c. 9th century AD), One of the Nayanmars. Author of Tiruvacakam
- Nambiyandar Nambi (c. 11th century AD), Saivite ascetic and poet. One of the authors of the Tirumurai.
- Siva Sri Paskarakurukkal, Sri Lankan Tamil priest resident in Germany, responsible for building the second biggest Hindu temple of Europe, the Sri Kamatchi Ampal Temple.
- Ramana Maharshi (1879–1950), saint and spiritual leader of Mount Arunachala.
- Seshadri Swamigal (1870–1929), Siddha or religious mendicant who lived in the forests of Arunachala.
- Sivananda Saraswati (1887–1963), yogi who lived in Rishikesh, in the foothills of Himalayas. He popularized Hatha Yoga in North America
- Sadasiva Brahmendra, Adhistanam at Nerur, near Kaur (died 1755)
- Shuddhananda Bharati (1897-1990)

== Scientists and academics ==
- L. K. Ananthakrishna Iyer (1861–1937), Indian anthropologist.
- Sir C. V. Raman (1888–1970), Indian physicist. Awarded the 1930 Nobel Prize in Physics for his work on the dispersion of light.
- Subrahmanyan Chandrasekhar (1910–1995), American physicist of Indian origin. Awarded the 1983 Nobel Prize in Physics. Nephew of Sir C. V. Raman.
- Prof. Venkatraman Ramakrishnan (b: 1952), Nobel Prize in Chemistry, 2009
- Prof. G. N. Ramachandran, (1922-2001), Bio-physicist

== Journalists and writers ==
- Thi. Janakiraman (1921–1983), Tamil novelist.
- K. V. Krishna Iyer (1894–1986), Indian historian. Author of standard reference books on Kerala History.
- Naccinarkiniyar (c. 10th century AD), Tamil writer who wrote a commentary on the Tholkappiyam.
- R. K. Narayan (1906–2001), Indian writer.
- Ulloor Parameswara Iyer (1877–1959), Malayalam poet.
- R. K. Laxman, (1921-2015), cartoonist
- K. V. Jagannathan (KIVAJA), (1906-1988), editor of Kalaimagal
- Kalki Krishnamurthy (1899-1954), Tamil writer and editor of Kalki magazine
- Cho Ramaswamy, (1934-2016), editor of Tuglak
- G. Subramania Iyer (1855-1916), first editor of Hindu
- S. S. Vasan, (1904-1969), owner/editor of Ananda Vikatan, a Tamil magazine
- Kalki Sadasivam, (1902-1997), founder of Kalki, a Tamil Magazine

== Advocates and social activists ==
- Sir S. Ramachandra Iyer, Chief Justice of the Madras High Court (1961–1964).
- C. S. Ranga Iyer (1895–1963), Indian journalist, politician and Indian independence activist. Proposed the Untouchability Abolition Bill in the Imperial Legislative Council (India) (now Lok Sabha) in 1932.
- Sir P. S. Sivaswami Iyer (1864–1946), Indian lawyer. Advocate General of Madras Presidency from 1907 to 1911.
- P. R. Sundaram Iyer (1862–1913), Indian lawyer and founder of Madras Law Journal. Grandfather of cinematographer P. C. Sreeram.
- M. Subbaraya Iyer (1885–1963), Indian lawyer and educationist.
- Pennathur Subramania Iyer (1860–1901), Indian lawyer, politician and philanthropist. Founder of P. S. Charities.
- Sir S. Subramania Iyer (1842–1924), Second Indian Judge of the High Court of Madras and one of the founders of the Home Rule movement in South India.
- A. Vaidyanatha Iyer (1890–1955), Indian activist. Participated in the Indian independence movement and organized the temple entry movement in the Meenakshi Temple in Madurai. President of the Tamil Nadu Harijan Seva Sangh.

== Indian Independence Movement ==
- U. V. Swaminatha Iyer (1855–1942), a Tamil scholar and researcher
- G. Subramania Iyer (1855–1916), Freedom fighter and founder of "The Hindu" English newspaper.
- Subramaniya Siva (1884–1925), Freedom fighter and close associate of Bharathi and V.V.S.Iyer
- S. A. Swaminatha Iyer (1849–1899), Indian lawyer and freedom-fighter.
- Kovai Subri (1898-1993), Tamil freedom fighter and devotional song writer

== Artists and musicians ==
- Rukmini Devi Arundale (1904–1986), danseuse and artist. Popularized Bharatanatyam. Founder of Kalakshetra
- Muthuswami Dikshitar (1775–1835), Composer. Formed the "Great Trinity of Carnatic Music" along with Thyagarajar and Shyama Shastri.
- Ranjani–Gayatri, sisters, Carnatic vocalists and violinists
- Karaikudi Sambasiva Iyer (d. 1958), Veena player, Sangeet Natak Akademi Fellowship (1952)
- E. Krishna Iyer (1897–1968), Indian lawyer, freedom-fighter, classical artist and activist who fought for the revival of Bharatanatyam.
- Janani Iyer (born 1987), Tamil film actress from Chennai
- Madurai Mani Iyer (1912–1968), singer of Carnatic music
- Patnam Subramania Iyer (1845–1902), composer of Carnatic music.
- Semmangudi Srinivasa Iyer (1907–2003), singer of Carnatic music
- Shankar Mahadevan, Music director
- K. V. Narayanaswamy (1923–2002), Singer of Carnatic music.
- Padma Subrahmanyam (born 1943), Bharatanatyam dancer from Chennai
- V. Selvaganesh (born 1966), Indian percussionist and carnatic musician. Son of T. H. Vinayakram.
- Syama Sastri, Composer. Formed the "Great Trinity of Carnatic Music" along with Muthuswami Dikshitar and Thyagarajar.
- Sikkil Sisters, Sikkil Kunjumani (born 1930) and Sikkil Neela (b. 1940), Carnatic vocalists.
- Tyagaraja (1767–1847), Composer of Carnatic music. Formed the "Great Trinity of Carnatic Music" along with Muthuswami Dikshitar and Shyama Shastri.
- Manambuchavadi Venkatasubbayyar (1803–1862), Carnatic musician and student of Thiagaraja.

== Military ==
- Ramaiyan (c. 17th century AD), Army general in the service of Thirumalai Nayak. Led the Madurai Nayak troops in the 1639 war against the Sethupathi of Ramnad. Subject of the ballad Ramayyan Ammanai.
- Nilakanta Krishnan Vice Admiral of Indian Navy

== Politicians and administrators ==
- Krishna Gopalayyan, Diwan of Travancore from 1768 to 1776.
- V. S. Krishna Iyer (born 1922), Indian politician and freedom-fighter. Member of Lok Sabha from Bangalore South (1984–1989)
- Mani Shankar Aiyar (born 1941), Indian politician from the Indian National Congress. Union Minister of Panchayat Raj, Youth Affairs and Sports.
- T. S. Narayana Iyer, Indian lawyer and civil servant. Diwan of Cochin kingdom from 1925 to 1930.
- C. R. Pattabhiraman (1906–2001), Indian lawyer and politician. Member of Lok Sabha for Kumbakonam (1957–1967). Eldest son of Sir C. P. Ramaswami Iyer.
- R. Ramasubbier, Indian politician, theosophist and Indian independence activist. Member of the Madras Legislative Council from 1892 to 1894.
- C. P. Ramaswami Iyer (1879–1966), Indian lawyer, administrator and statesman. Advocate General of State of Madras (1920–1923), Diwan of Travancore (1936–1947).
- Ramayyan Dalawa, Dewan of Travancore from 1737 to 1756. Strategic advisor to Maharaja Martanda Varma during the Battle of Colachel against the Dutch.
- K. Seshadri Iyer, (1845–1901) Diwan of Mysore from February 1883 to March 1901, the longest tenure for any Dewan of the princely state. Regarded as the "maker of modern Bangalore".
- T. V. Seshagiri Iyer (1860–1926), Indian lawyer and politician. Member of the Madras Legislative Council 1923-1926. Founder of the India Boat Club in Kodaikanal.
- A. Seshayya Sastri (1828–1903), Indian administrator. Dewan of Travancore from 1872 to 1877 and Pudukkottai from 1878 to 1894.
- M. R. Sethuratnam Iyer, Indian politician. Minister of Development in the government of P. Subbarayan from 1928 to 1930.
- S. Shungrasoobyer (1836–1904), Dewan of Travancore from 1892 to 1898.
- Jana Krishnamurthi (1928–2007), Indian politician and one of the co-founders of BJP. Served as the 7th National President of BJP (2001–2002); Member of Rajya Sabha from Gujarat (2002-2007); Law Minister of India (2002-2003)
- Subramanian Swamy (1939- ), six times MP, ex Minister of the Central Government & Professor of Economics
- T. N. Seshan, (1932 - ) ex-Election Commissioner of India
- T. S. Krishnamurthy, (1941- ) ex-Election Commissioner of India
- Subramaniam V. Iyer, (1957- ) Chief Operating Officer of the Multilateral Investment Guarantee Agency
- Nilakanta Mahadeva Ayyar (1899- 1971)- Indian Civil Service awarded Order of the Indian Empire

== Sports people ==
- Vishwanathan Anand, chess Grand Master
- Ravichandran Ashwin, cricket player
- Shreyas Iyer, cricket player
- Ramanathan Krishnan, tennis player
- Ramesh Krishnan, tennis player
- Venkatesh Iyer, cricket player
