= Hinduism in Germany =

German Hindus

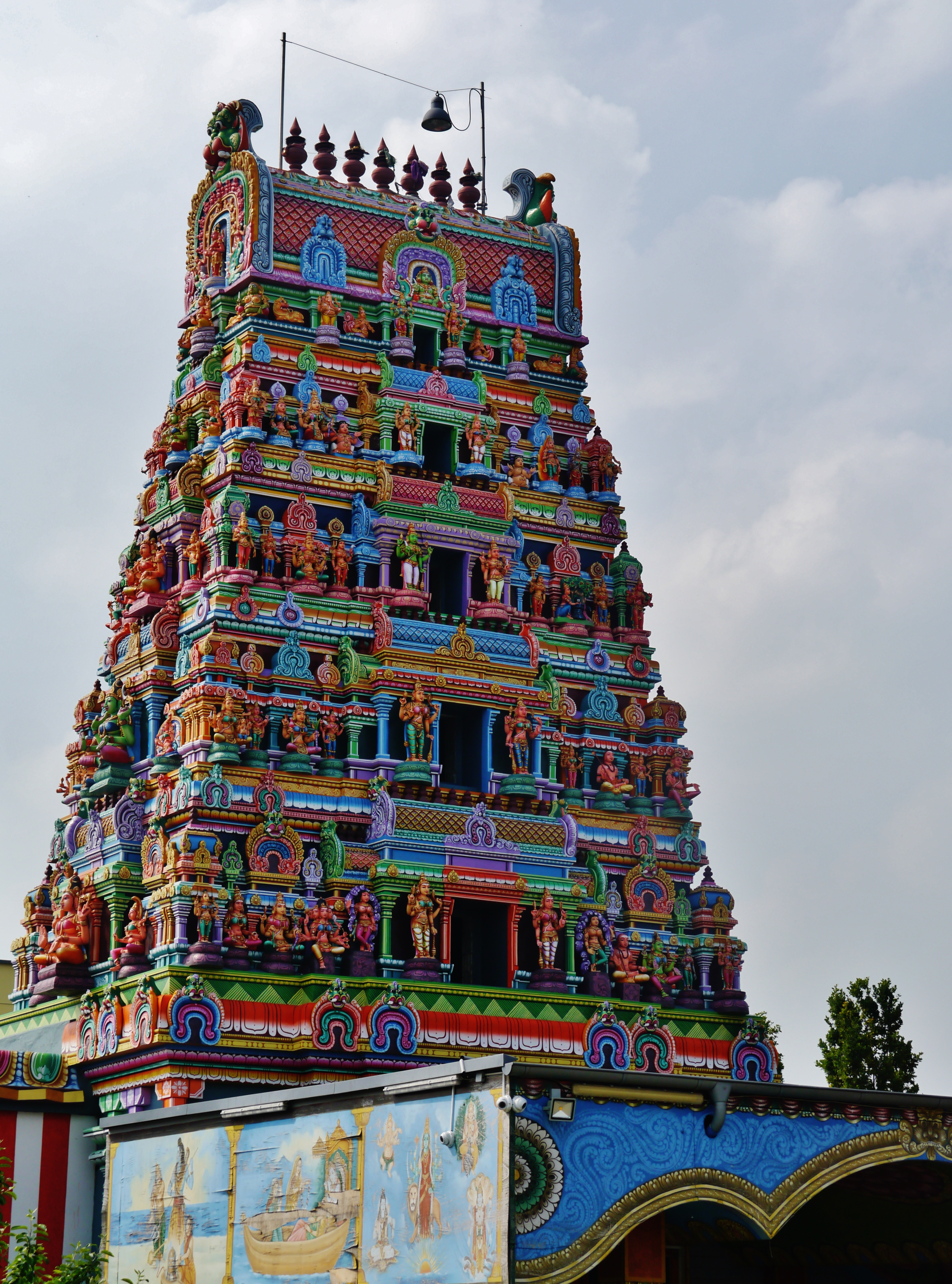
- Sri Kamakshi Amman temple in Hamm

Total population
- c.130,000 (2017)

Religions
- Shaivism (majority); Vaishnavism, Shaktism (minority)

Scriptures
- Agamas, Bhagavad Gita and Vedas

Languages
- Sanskrit (sacred); Hindi, Tamil, Pashto, Dari, Balinese, German, English (Majority)

Hinduism is a minority religion in Germany practiced by an estimated 100,000 to 150,000 people, or an estimated 0.12% of the population.

It is the country’s fourth-largest religion after Christianity, irreligion, and Islam. The community is highly diverse, consisting primarily of Sri Lankan Tamil Hindus (refugees since the 1980s), Indian Hindus (post-1950s migrants and recent skilled workers), smaller Afghan Hindu and Balinese groups, and a number of German/European converts.

Germany's encounter with Hinduism has a unique history. Unlike Britain's colonial relationship with India, Germany’s engagement with Hinduism grew mainly out of academic and philosophical fascination.

== History ==
=== German Indology and Hindu Philosophy ===
German interest in Hinduism first grew out of the Romantic movement's deep fascination with ancient India. Indian literature captured the imagination of writers and thinkers. In 1791, Georg Forster published the first German translation of Kālidāsa’s famous play Śākuntalā (based on William Jones's English version). This work captivated major literary figures, including Johann Gottfried Herder and Johann Wolfgang von Goethe, who famously wrote an epigram praising the drama. In 1808 Friedrich Schlegel’s Über die Sprache und Weisheit der Indier (On the Language and Wisdom of the Indians) argued that Sanskrit was the root of a shared Indo-European language family. This theory shaped European intellectual thought and helped drive the creation of formal academic departments for Indological research.

=== Friedrich Max Mueller and the translation of the Vedas ===
Friedrich Max Müller (1823–1900), born in Dessau, was one of the leading scholars who introduced ancient Hindu texts to European audiences. After studying Sanskrit under Franz Bopp in Berlin and Eugène Burnouf in Paris, he moved to England in 1846. With patronage from the East India Company, he produced the first critical edition of the Rigveda (including Sāyaṇa's 14th-century commentary), published in six volumes between 1849 and 1874. He later edited the Sacred Books of the East (1879–1910), a 50-volume series of English translations of major religious texts from Hinduism, Buddhism, Zoroastrianism, and other Asian traditions.

== Demographics ==
=== Indian Hindus ===
Hindu migration from India to Germany started picking up in the 1950s and continued at a fairly slow pace through the 1970s. Most of the early arrivals were men, typically students and professionals, such as physicians and engineers. They generally came from upper middle-class backgrounds and many have gone on to build successful careers and businesses. Even though plenty of them were financially comfortable, they did not leave much of a visible religious footprint. Most worship happened quietly in private homes, and the only Indian Hindu temple in Frankfurt at the time turned out to be short-lived. By the 2000s, the Indian Hindu population in Germany had grown to an estimated 60,000–80,000.

=== Sri Lankan Hindus ===
From the late 1970s, Sri Lankan Tamils formed another stream of Hindu migration to Germany. Unlike Indian migrants, much of the Sri Lankan Tamil migration came primarily from asylum seekers amid the island’s escalating ethnic conflict and civil war. Around 74% of these asylum seekers were Hindu. In 1978, approximately 1,300 Sri Lankans (mainly students) were living in Germany, however after the outbreak of war in 1983, arrivals increased sharply, with 17,400 Sri Lankan refugees applying for asylum in 1985 alone. By 2003, there were 64,000 Tamils living in Germany. In 2023 it was estimated that around 42,000–45,000 Hindus in Germany were Sri Lankan Tamils.

When migrant Tamil Hindus first arrived in the 1980s there were very few places of worship and religious institutions for Hindus were virtually non-existent. They quickly established places of worship, many initially situated in cellars, flats, and former warehouses. By 2011, they had founded approximately 34 Hindu temples. These temples are predominantly located in North Rhine-Westphalia, where the Tamil Hindu diaspora concentrated. Martin Baumann states that the establishment of religious places of worship for the Sri Lankan Hindu community allowed for integration into German society as well as the maintenance of one's own identity. These temples were 'hardly known and noticed by the public'.

=== Afghan Hindus ===
Afghan Hindus form a smaller refugee-origin community in Germany, the population of Afghan Hindus is approximately 7,000-10,000. Many arrived from the 1980s onward, following the Soviet–Afghan War and later persecution under the Taliban. Afghan Hindus established temples in Hamburg, Frankfurt, Cologne and Essen. The community has faced asylum challenges. In 2005 the United States Commission on International Religious Freedom urged the U.S. to press Germany against deporting Afghan Hindu refugees due to risks of violence and persecution in Afghanistan. The USCIRF considered the Afghan Hindu population as one of the most severely persecuted groups under the Taliban.

=== Hindus of other ethnicities ===
Besides Indian and Sri Lankan Tamil Hindus, there are approximately 7,500 white Hindus.

== Temples ==
The presence of Hindu temples in Germany is closely associated with immigration, in particular the arrival of Sri Lankan Tamils since the 1980s. Martin Baumann, a religious studies scholar, recorded four Tamil Hindu temples in Germany in 1989; by 2009 that number had risen to twenty-five.

The Sri Kamadchi Ampal Temple in Hamm, founded by Sri Lankan Tamil priest Siva Sri Paskarakurukkal, was consecrated in 2002. The temple is dedicated to the goddess Kamakshi and was built largely by Sri Lankan Tamil refugees. Several prominent Hindu temples are also located in Berlin. The Sri Mayurapathy Murugan Temple in Britz was consecrated in 2013, while the Sri Ganesha Hindu Temple in Neukölln was consecrated in June 2026 after more than two decades of planning. Other notable Tamil temples include the Sri Muthumariamman Temple in Hanover, consecrated in 2009.

Temples established by migrant communities have also attracted native Germans. At the Sri Kamadchi Ampal Temple in Hamm, a small German congregation has developed around the chief priest. Wilke describes this congregation as being on friendly terms with the Sri Lankan Tamil congregation. The Krishna temple in Bielefeld has likewise attracted many German devotees.

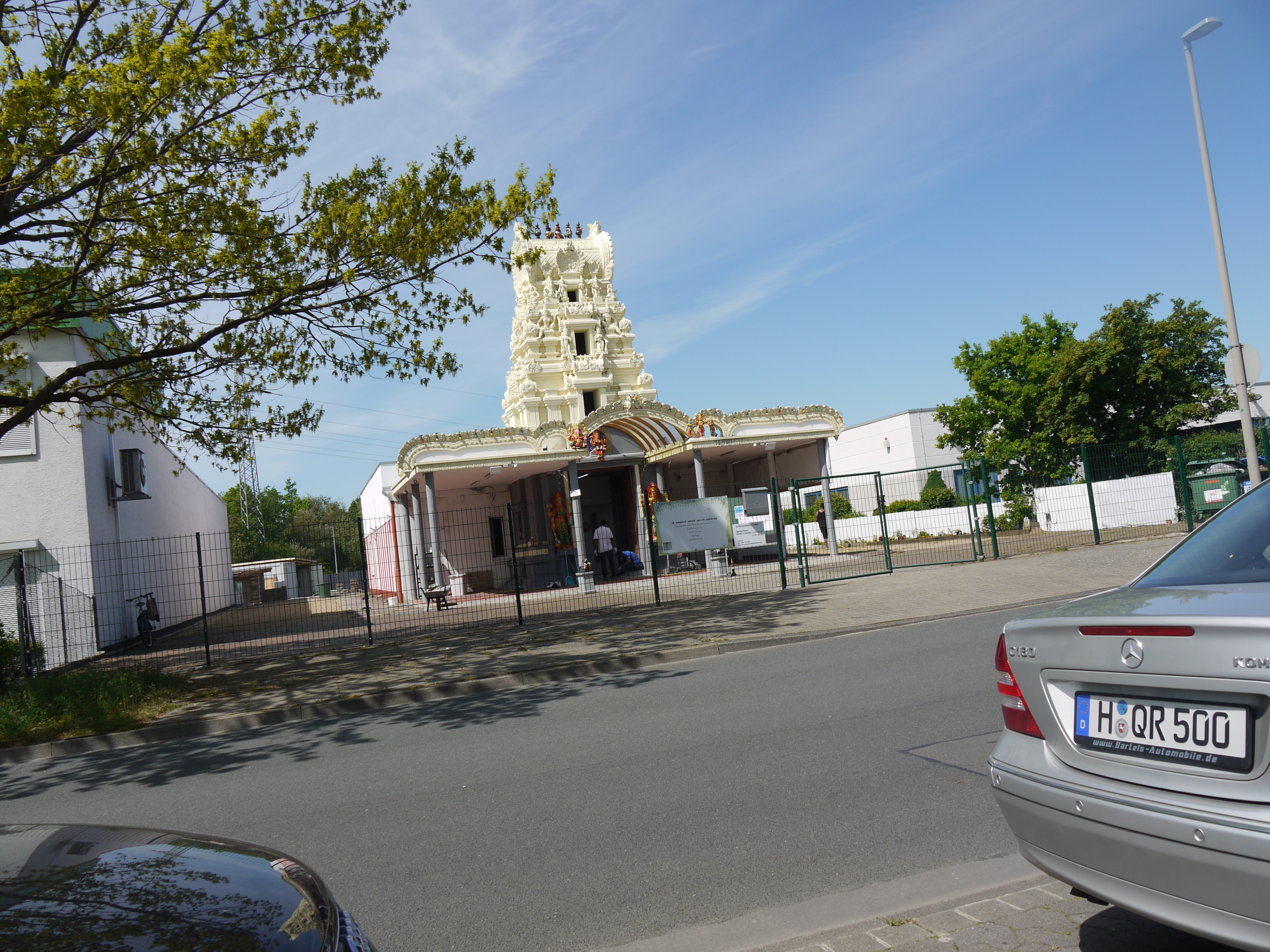
Sri Muthumariamman Temple

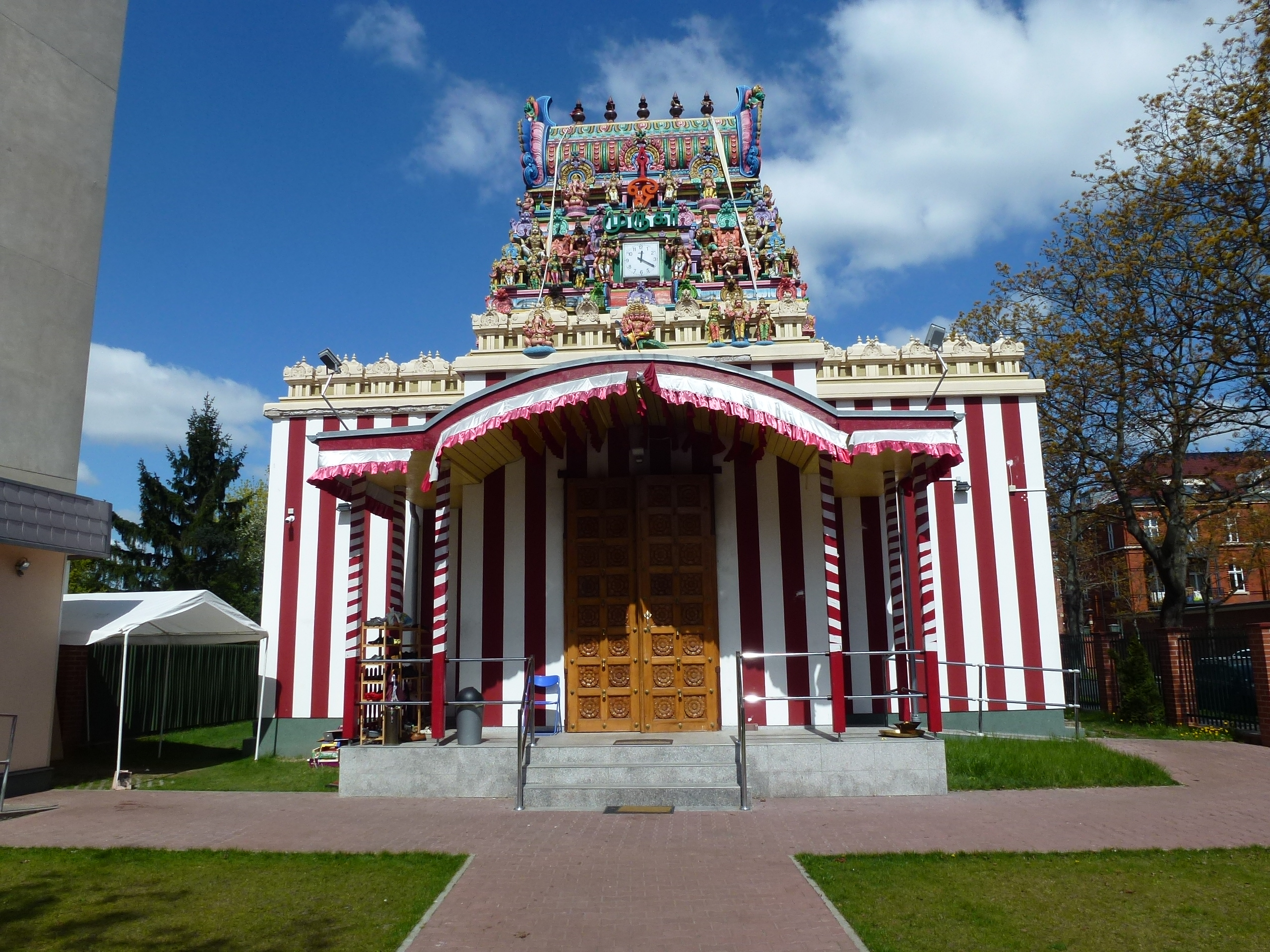
Britz Blaschkoallee Sri Mayurapathy Murugan Temple

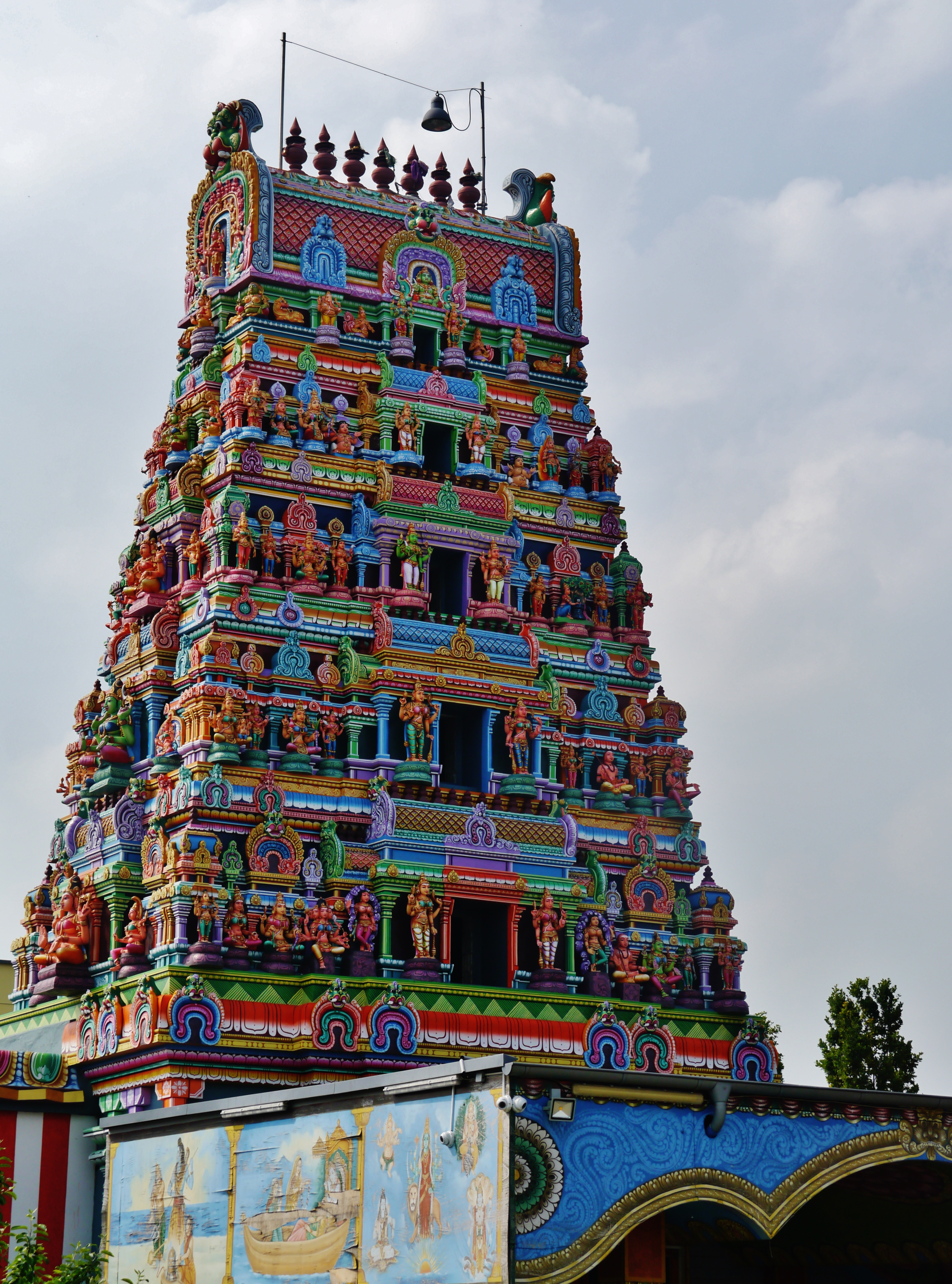
Sri Kamadchi Ampal Temple in Hamm

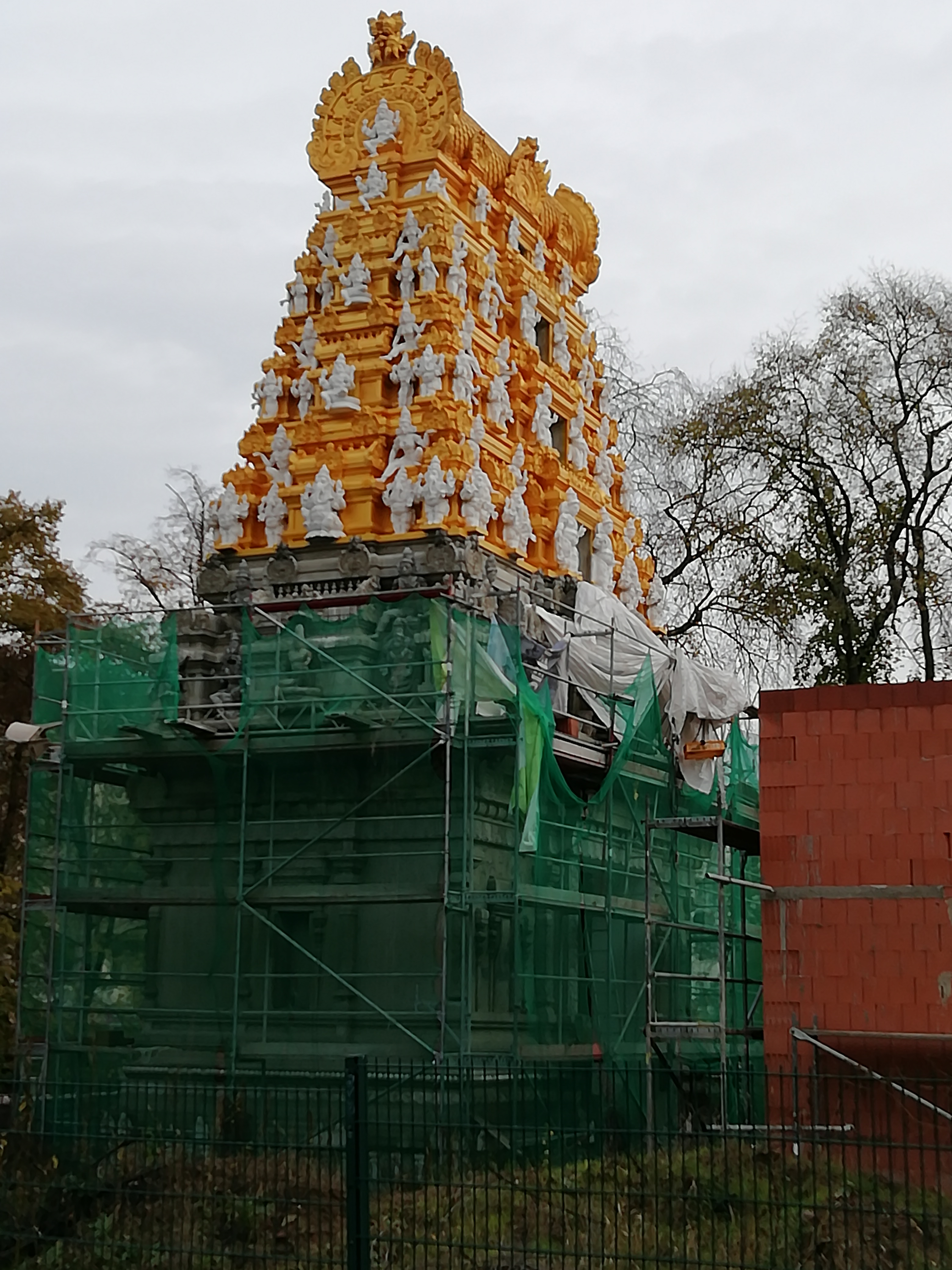
Sri Ganesha Hindu Temple in Berlin-Neukölln

== Denominations and organizations ==
Germany has over 50–100 Hindu temples and worship sites, the large majority are Tamil. Many began as makeshift spaces and evolved into purpose-built structures.

=== ISKCON ===
Among the Indian-based Hindu movements that drew young Germans in the 1960s and 1970s, ISKCON has been the group most consistently engaged in opening temples. Annette Wilke notes that, apart from ISKCON and, to a much smaller degree, the Sathya Sai Baba movement, other newer Hindu-based organisations have shown little interest in temple building. Since the 1980s ISKCON has run a temple, Simhachalam, located in Jandelsbrunn within the Bavarian Forest.

=== Balinese Hinduism ===
There are about 700 Balinese Hindu families living in Germany, with the one temple located in Hamburg in front of the Museum of Ethnology, Hamburg and the second, Pura Tri Hita Karana located in Erholungspark Marzahn, Berlin. It is a functioning Hindu temple located in the Balinese Garden of the park and is one of the few Hindu temples of Balinese architecture built outside Indonesia.

== Cultural influence of Hindu thought in Germany ==
Hinduism's cultural influence in Germany has also extended beyond contemporary immigrant religious communities. From the late eighteenth century, Sanskrit literature and Hindu religious texts became important subjects in German Romanticism, comparative philology and Indology.

Beyond the historical philosophical engagement with Hindu thought by German intellectuals, elements of Hindu and broader Indian culture have gained significant popularity in contemporary German society. Yoga is particularly widespread, and a nationally representative study estimated that 15.7 million Germans either practice yoga or are interested in doing so. Ayurveda and meditation have also been adopted in health and alternative medicine contexts. Hindu religious festivals have also gained some public visibility, for example, through Diwali events in Berlin.

Germany’s older tradition of Indology remains visible in university teaching and research on Hindu and South Asian religious traditions. Universities including Heidelberg, Hamburg and Göttingen maintain programs in Indology or South Asian studies covering Sanskrit, Indian religions and philosophy.

== Legal status and public life ==
Most Hindu congregations in Germany are organised as registered associations (eingetragene Vereine). In 2017, North Rhine-Westphalia granted the Sri Kamadchi Ampal Temple association the rights of a Körperschaft des öffentlichen Rechts (corporation under public law). The association later adopted the name Hinduistische Gemeinde in Deutschland. This status allows it, among other things, to levy a religious tax on its members.

Legal issues, in particular immigration, have also affected Hindu refugee communities. Many Sri Lankan Tamils lived for years on temporary residence permits before naturalisation became more common. Afghan Hindus faced possible deportation in the mid-2000s, when Hamburg and other states moved to return Afghans. The Central Council of Afghan Hindus and Sikhs, founded in 2002, as well as the USCIRF campaigned against such deportations.

== Notable German Hindus ==
- Claudia Ciesla, Bollywood actress
- Walther Eidlitz, writer, poet, Indologist
- Hansadutta Swami
- Mother Meera
- Siva Sri Paskarakurukkal
- Mathias Rust
- Sadananda
- Sacinandana Swami
- Sivananda Radha Saraswati - German-born yoga guru, born Sylvia Demitz
- Georg Feuerstein - Indologist

== See also ==
- Indians in Germany
- Religion in Germany
- Hinduism in Luxembourg
