= Hinduism in the West =

Total population
- c. 7.2 million▲ (~1% of the total population)

Regions with significant populations
- United States: 3,369,976
- United Kingdom: 1,066,894
- Canada: 828,195
- Australia: 684,002
- Italy: 223,000
- Netherlands: 210,000
- New Zealand: 153,534
- Germany: 130,000
- France: 120,000
- Spain: 75,000

Religions
- Hinduism; Notable Individuals; Followed mostly by converted and immigrant Hindus identified as American Hindus, European Hindus, Australian Hindus, British Hindus etc.

Scriptures
- Bhagavad Gita and Vedas

Languages
- Sacred language: Sanskrit; Predominant spoken languages: English; Dutch; French; German; Italian; Russian; Spanish; and other official languages; Hindi and its dialects; Bengali; Gujarati; Kannada; Kashmiri; Konkani; Maithili; Malayalam; Marathi; Nepali; Punjabi; Pashto; Sindhi; Tamil; Telugu; Indian Languages; Balinese; Cham; Indonesian; Javanese; Malay; Caribbean Hindustani; Caribbean English; Mauritian Creole; Fiji Hindi and other Asian languages (among diaspora)

The reception of Hinduism in the Western world began in the 19th century, at first at an academic level of religious studies and antiquarian interest in Sanskrit.

== History ==
=== 18th century ===
During this time, most British and American writers conceptualized all religions through the taxonomy of Christianity, Judaism, Islam, and Heathens. Termed "Hindoo religion," it was subsumed by the blanket label of heathenism.

Beginning in the 1780s, American merchants took religious items from India along with trade goods. For example, the East India Marine Society (EIMS) in Salem, Massachusetts took statues of Rama and Sita for their collection, which represented Hinduism as the "Oriental east."

An exchange of ideas has been taking place between the western world and Asia since the late 18th century as a result of colonization of parts of Asia by Western powers. This also influenced western religiosity. The first translation of Upanishads, published in two parts in 1801 and 1802, significantly influenced Arthur Schopenhauer, who called them the consolation of his life. He drew explicit parallels between his philosophy, as set out in The World as Will and Representation, and that of the Vedanta philosophy as described in the work of Sir William Jones. Early translations also appeared in other European languages. Influenced by Śaṅkara's concepts of Brahman (God) and māyā (illusion), Lucian Blaga often used the concepts marele anonim (the Great Anonymous) and cenzura transcendentă (the transcendental censorship) in his philosophy.

Paul Deussen, influenced by Schopenhauer, elevated Indian philosophy, particularly Advaita Vedanta, within German idealism and Indology. His works, including those on history of philosophy and Upanishad translations, portrayed Vedanta as the core of Indian thought, shaping 20th century scholarship. Deussen upheld Advaita as the original truth and acknowledged variations like Visistadvaita and Dvaita. He proposed a six-stage regression model tracing philosophy's decline from monistic idealism to realism and theism, paralleling Indian and Greek traditions.

=== 19th-20th century ===
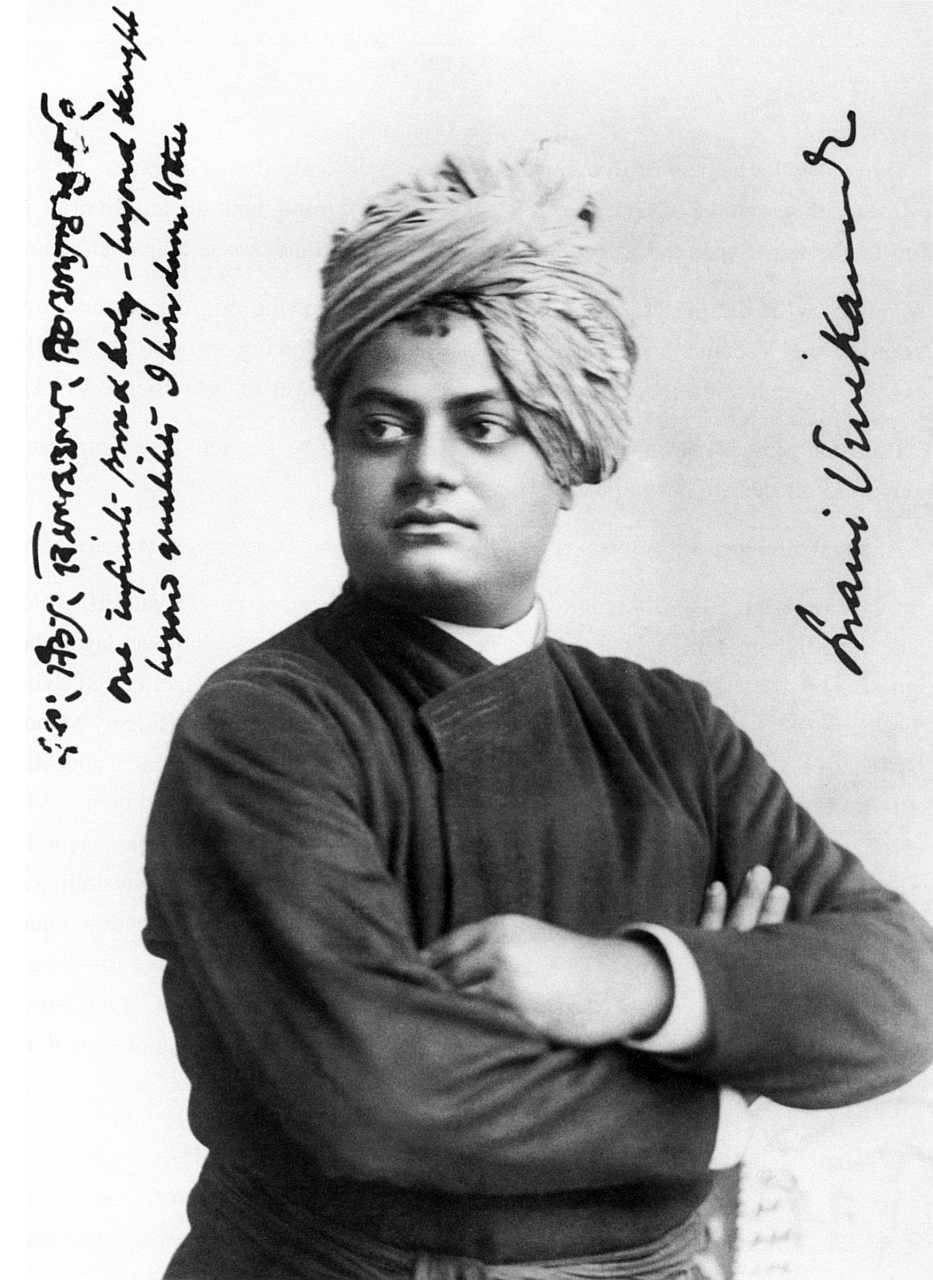
Swami Vivekananda was a key figure in the introduction of the Indian philosophies of Vedanta and Yoga to the Western world.

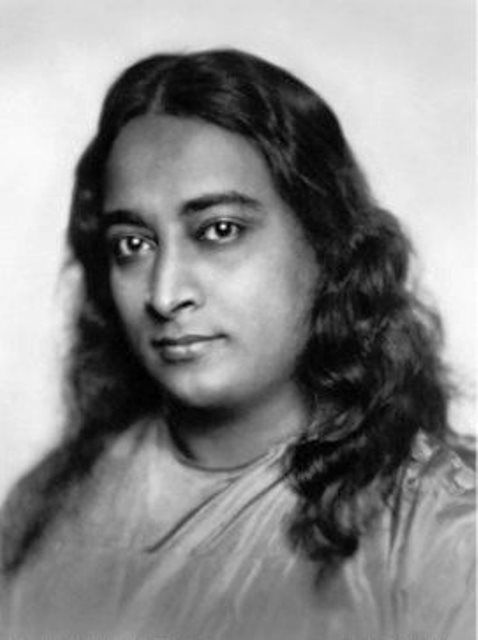
Paramahansa Yogananda founded the Self-Realization Fellowship (SRF) in the United States.

During the British colonial period, the British substantially influenced Indian society, but India also influenced the western world. An early champion of Indian-inspired thought in the West was Arthur Schopenhauer who in the 1850s advocated ethics based on an "Aryan-Vedic theme of spiritual self-conquest", as opposed to the ignorant drive toward earthly utopianism of the superficially this-worldly "Jewish" spirit.

Ralph Waldo Emerson and Henry David Thoreau turned to translations of the Vedas, Upanishads, Bhagavad Gita, Vishnu Sarma, and Vishnu Purana as an alternative to the main forms of Protestantism present around them. However, early engagement between American thinkers and Hindu ideas in the 19th century was also shaped by Orientalism, often reducing the Hindu religion to mystical abstraction or primitive superstition.

Vivekananda introduced a form of yoga to America that fit Western audience's want for techniques that focused on getting results.

In the early 20th century, Western occultists influenced by Hinduism include Maximiani Portaz – an advocate of "Aryan Paganism" – who styled herself Savitri Devi and Jakob Wilhelm Hauer, founder of the German Faith Movement. It was in this period, and until the 1920s, that the swastika became a ubiquitous symbol of good luck in the West before its association with the Nazi Party became dominant in the 1930s. In 1920, Yogananda came to the United States as India's delegate to an International Congress of Religious Liberals convening in Boston; the same year he founded the Self-Realization Fellowship (SRF) to disseminate worldwide his teachings on India's ancient practices and philosophy of Yoga and its tradition of meditation.

=== Neo-Hindu movements 1950s–1980s ===
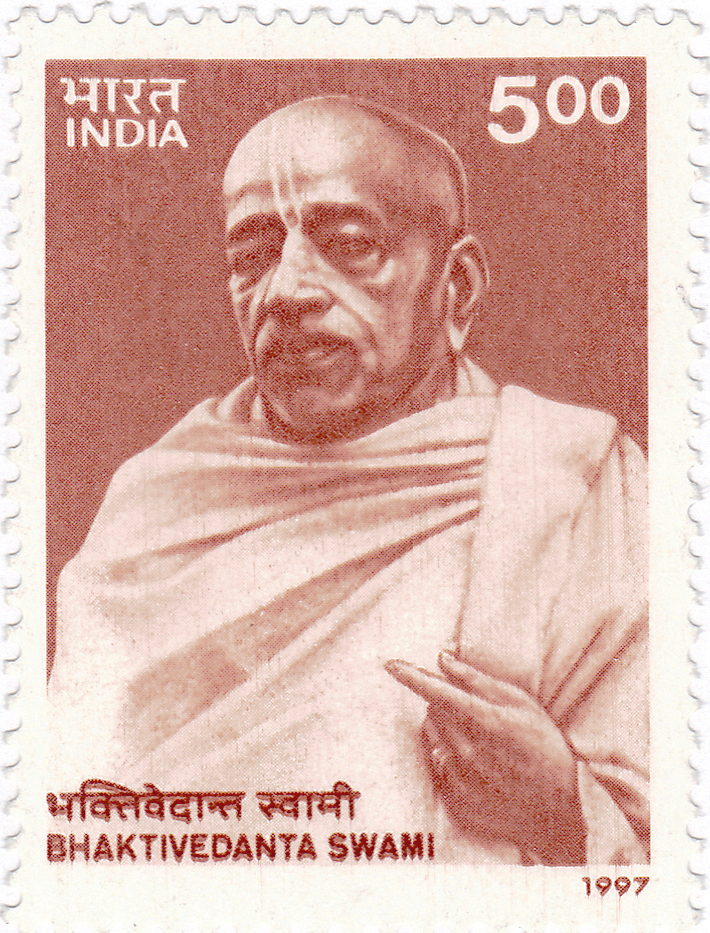
Swami Prabhupada, founder preceptor (Acharya) of the International Society for Krishna Consciousness (ISKCON), commonly known as the "Hare Krishna Movement" in the Western world.

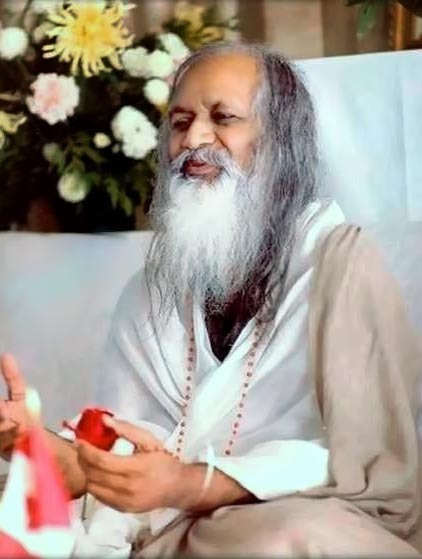
Maharishi Mahesh Yogi, founder of the Transcendental Meditation movement and bringing Transcendental Meditation to the Western world.

During the 1960s to 1970s counter-culture, Sathya Sai Baba (Sathya Sai Organization), A.C. Bhaktivedanta Swami Prabhupada (ISKCON or "Hare Krishna"), Guru Maharaj Ji (Divine Light Mission) and Maharishi Mahesh Yogi (Transcendental Meditation movement) attracted a notable western following, founding religious or quasi-religious movements that remain active into the present time. This group of movements founded by charismatic persons with a corpus of esoteric writings, predominantly in English, is classed as founding, proselytizing religions, or "guru-ism" by Michaels.

Hatha Yoga was popularized from the 1960s by B.K.S. Iyengar, K. Pattabhi Jois and others. However, western practice of Yoga has mostly become detached from its religious or mystic context and is predominantly practiced as exercise or as alternative medicine.

Jaggi Vasudev, otherwise known as Sadhguru has been influential in the revival of New Age Hinduism in the West. By diverging from traditional ways of teaching Hinduism, Sadhguru offers a New Age Hinduism which resonates with second-generation South-Asian Americans who are navigating the intersection of their Indian roots and Western identity.

== Hindu migration to Western countries ==
Substantial Hindu emigration from India has taken place since the 1970s. Several million Hindus have moved from Islamic Republic of Pakistan & People's Republic of Bangladesh to North America and Western Europe to prevent religious persecution.

== Hinduism-derived elements in popular culture ==
Growing out of the enthusiasm for Hinduism in 1960s counterculture, modern western popular culture adopted elements of Hinduism which are now not considered necessary to practice in a religious context. For example, it is estimated that around 30 million Americans and 5 million Europeans regularly practice some form of Hatha Yoga, mainly as exercise. In Australia, the number of practitioners is about 300,000. In New Zealand, the number is also around 300,000.

Author Kathleen Hefferon comments that "In the West, a more modernized "New Age" version of Ayurveda has recently gained popularity as a unique form of complementary and alternative medicine".

"Vegetarianism, nonviolent ethics, yoga, and meditation—all have enjoyed spates of Occidental popularity in the last 40 years, often influenced by ISKCON directly, if not indirectly."

== Photo gallery ==
Pictures of Hinduism in the West
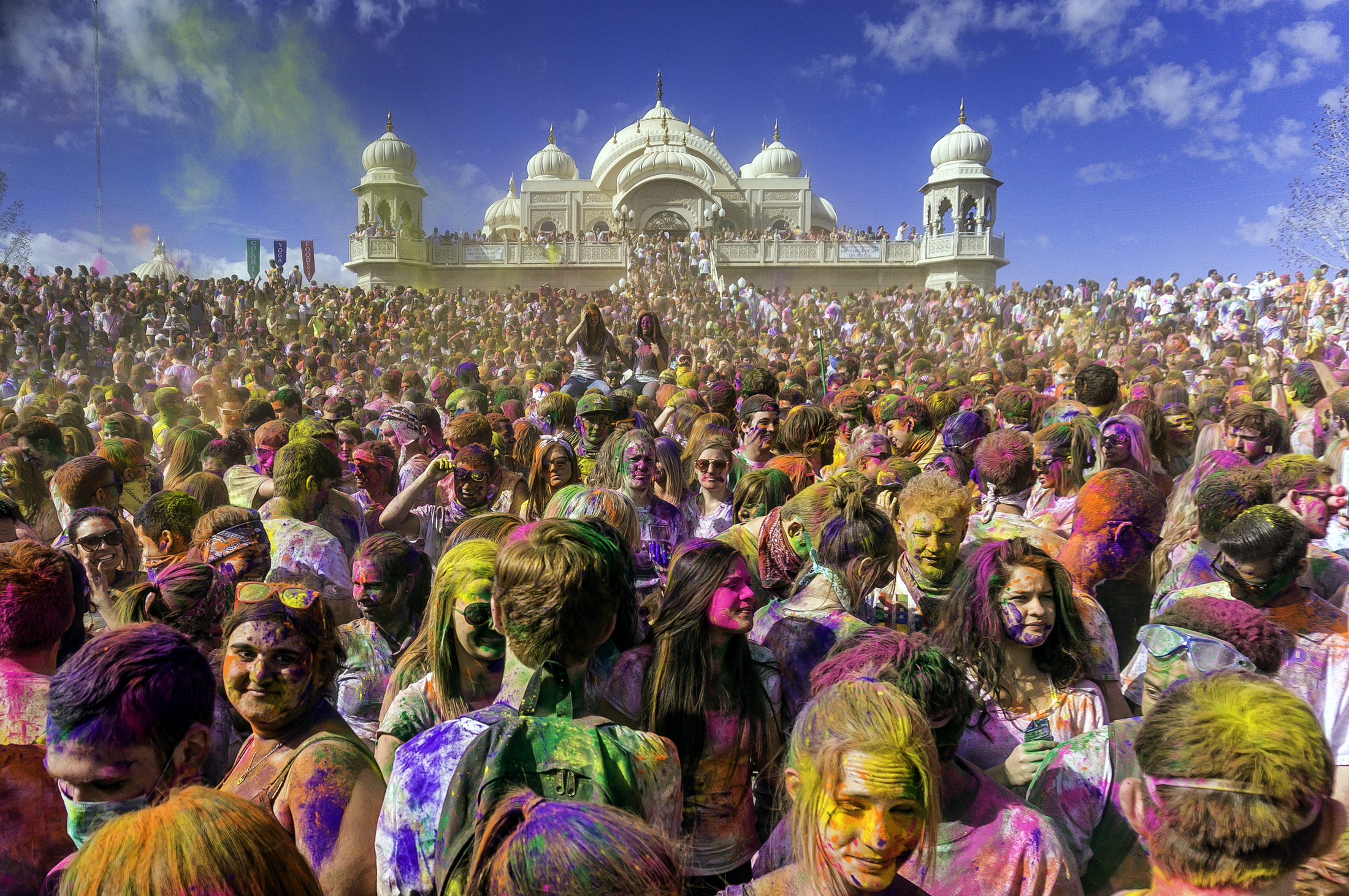
The Holi Festival in March 2013 at the Sri Sri Radha Krishna Temple in Utah County, Utah

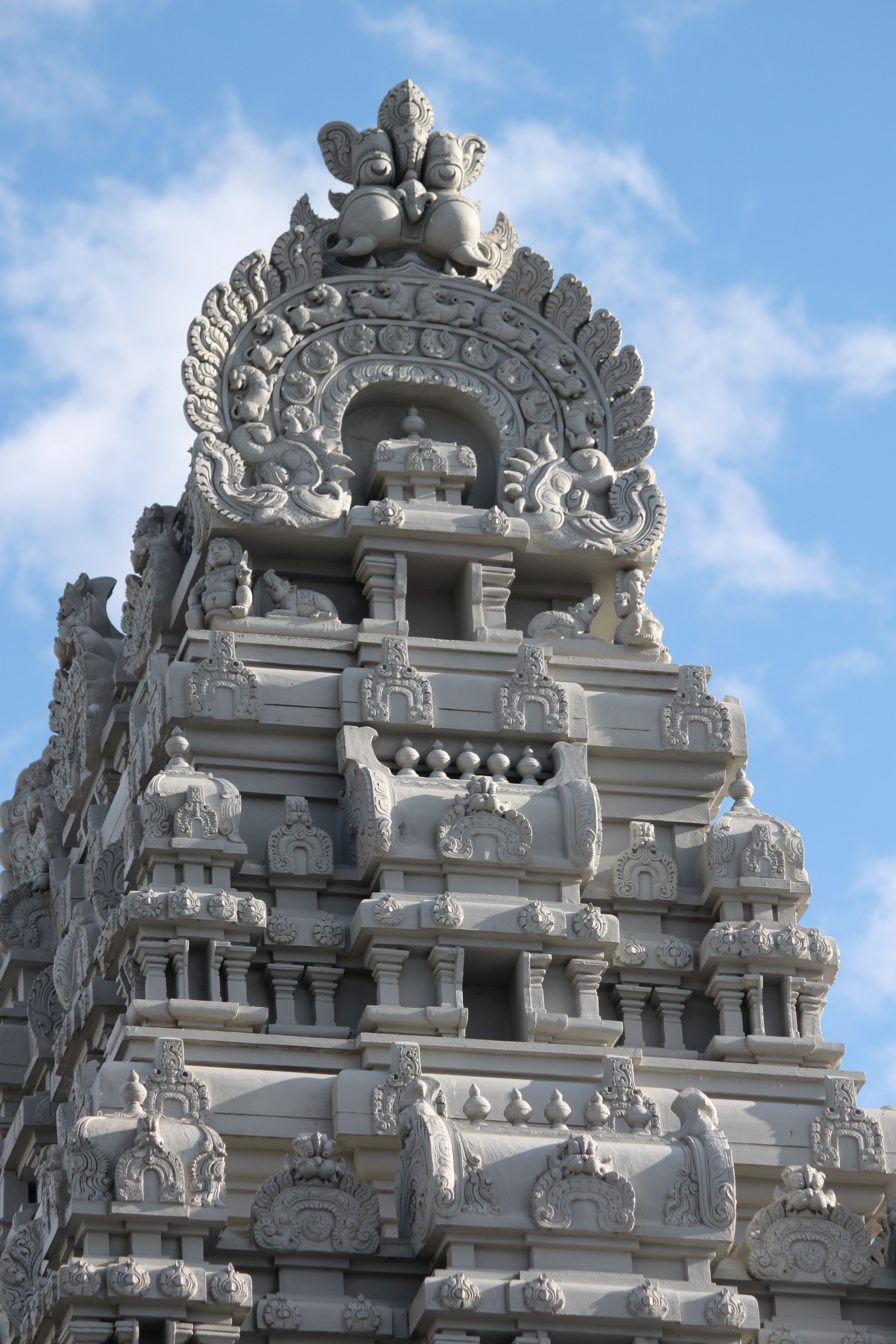
Ganesh Temple in Flushing, Queens, New York City, the oldest Hindu temple in the Western Hemisphere

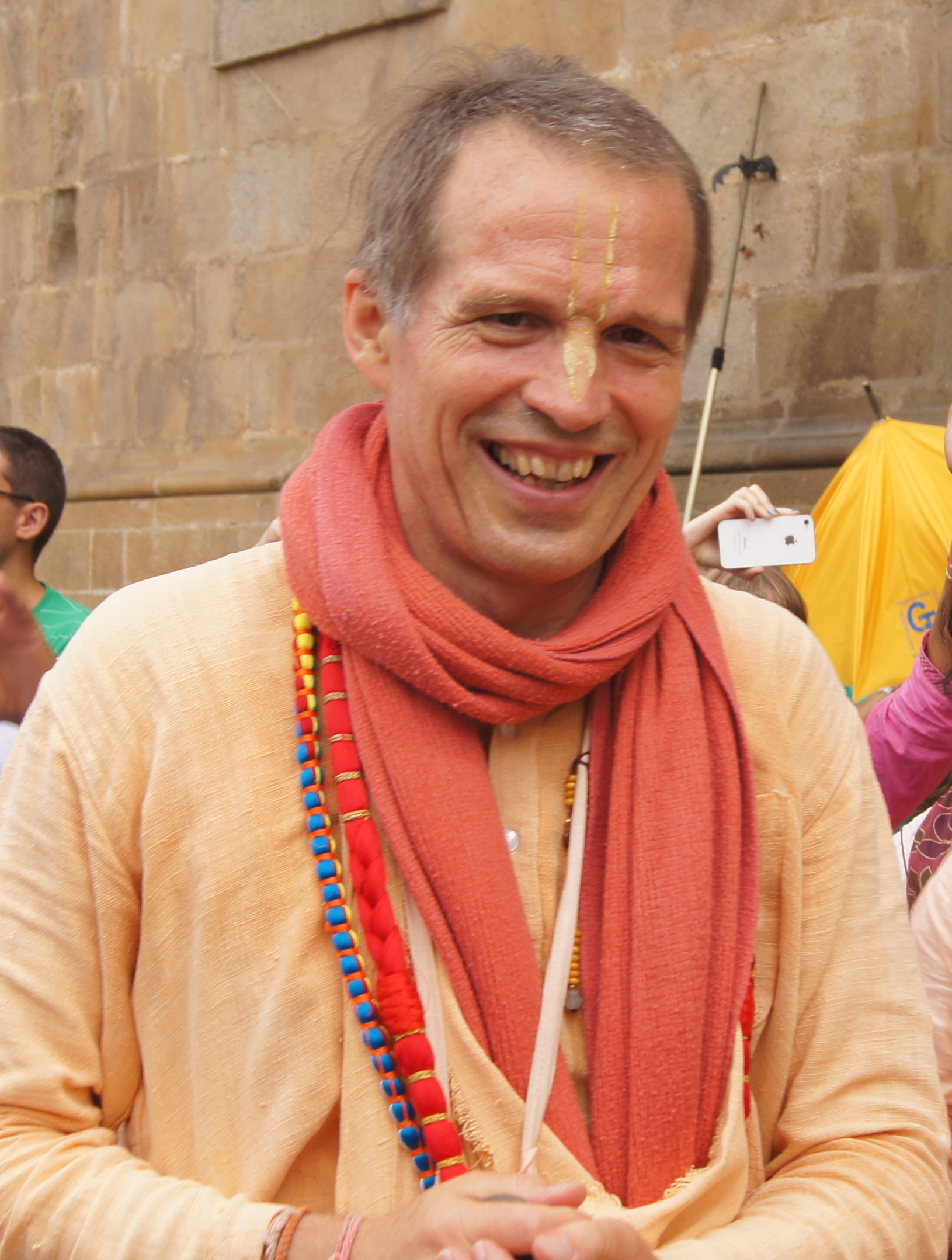
Sacinandana Swami

== See also ==
- Hindu reform movements
- Sanskrit in the West
- Esotericism in Germany and Austria
- Ramakrishna's impact
- Neo-Advaita
- Californian Hindu textbook controversy
- Category:Converts to Hinduism
- Hindu denominations
- Hindu Temple Society of North America, Flushing
- Hinduism in Australia
- Hinduism in Canada
- Hinduism in Europe
- Hinduism in New Zealand
- Hinduism in the United Kingdom
- Hinduism in the United States
- Indians in the New York City metropolitan area
- Invading the Sacred
- List of Hindu temples in the United States

Organizations

- Hindu University of America
- Parliament of the World's Religions
- Hindu American Foundation
- United States India Political Action Committee (USINPAC)
