= Sri Kamadchi Ampal Temple (Hamm) =

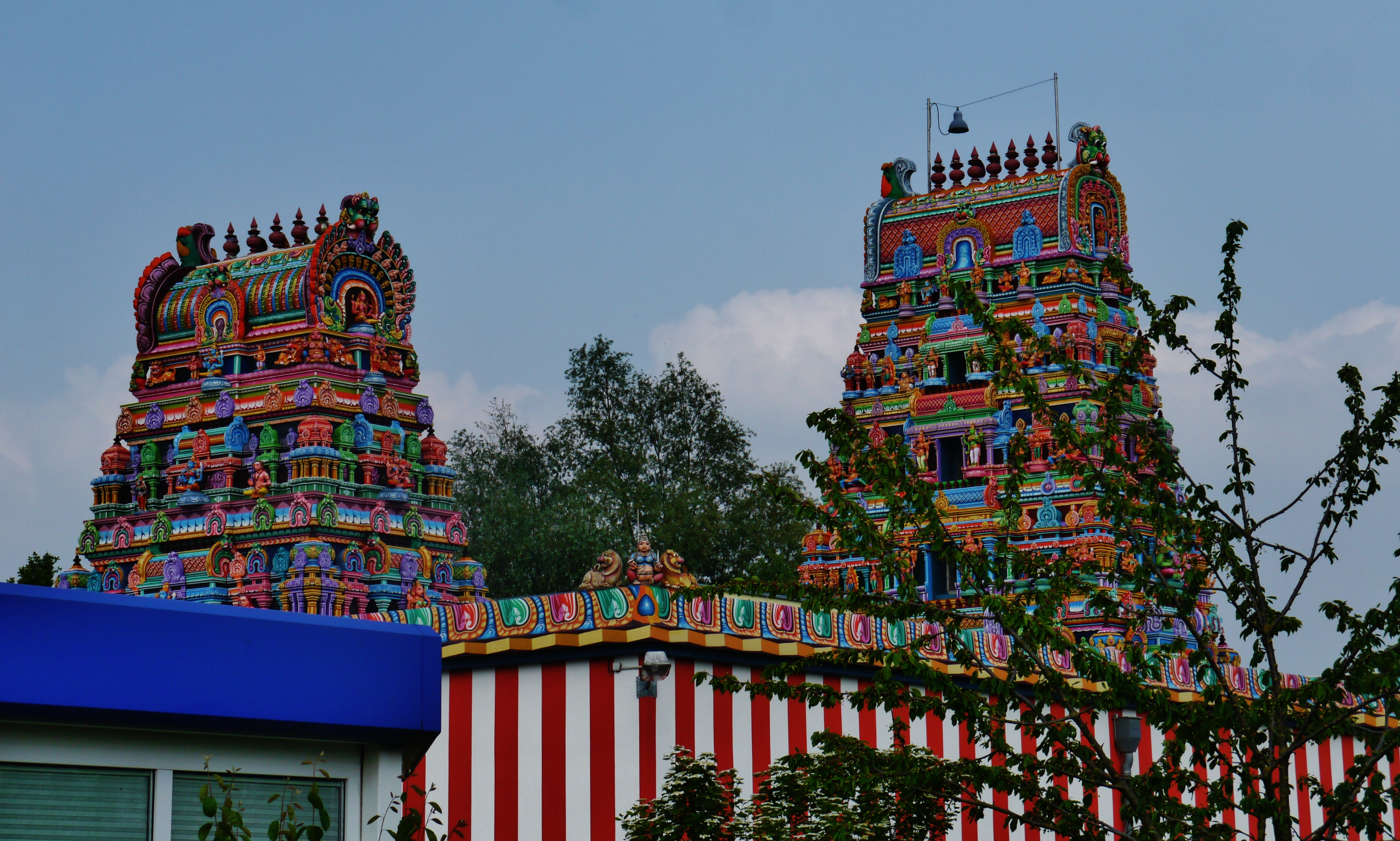
- Towers of Sri Kamadchi Ampal Hindu Temple, Hamm

- Location in Germany

Religion
- Affiliation: Hinduism
- Deity: Kamakshi

Location
- Location: Hamm, North Rhine-Westphalia
- Country: Germany
- Coordinates: 51.6871269°N 7.9509873°E

Architecture
- Type: Dravidian architecture

The Sri Kamadchi Ampal Temple (Tamil: ஸ்ரீ காமாக்ஷி அம்பாள் ஆலயம்) is a Hindu temple (mandir) in the city of Hamm, North Rhine-Westphalia, Germany. Dedicated to the goddess Kamakshi, a form of Tripura Sundari, it was built largely by Sri Lankan Tamil refugees and consecrated on 7 July 2002. The temple has been described by its community and in German media as the largest Dravidian-style (South Indian) Hindu temple in mainland Europe. It is regarded as the second-largest Hindu temple in Europe after the Neasden Temple in London.

== History ==
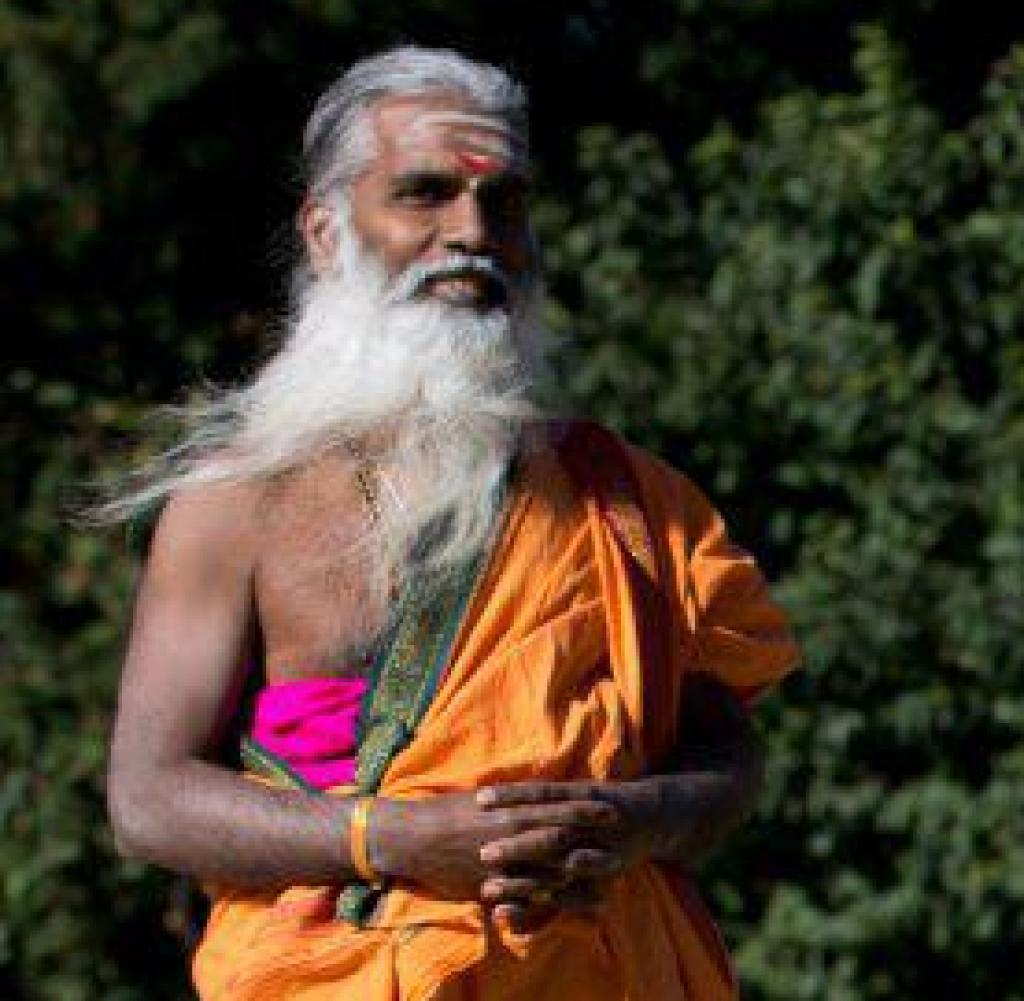
Siva Sri Arumugam Paskarakurukkal

The temple’s origins are connected to the Sri Lankan Civil War. Beginning in the mid-1980s, large numbers of Sri Lankan Tamils, many of them Hindu, fled to Western Europe as refugees. One such refugee was Siva Sri Arumugam Paskarakurukkal, a priest who had trained at the Kamakshi Amman Temple in Kanchipuram. After settling in Hamm, he established a small shrine in the basement of his rented apartment in 1989. At the time, only a handful of Hindu temples existed in Germany.

When the basement shrine no longer met building safety standards, the community moved in 1992 to a converted laundry building nearby. The annual festival, which included a public procession, attracted growing numbers of worshippers. This led to complaints from neighbours and the city council concluded that it should relocate from the residential area. A suitable site was found in an industrial estate in the Uentrop district. A provisional temple operated there from 1997. Construction of the present building began with the laying of the foundation stone in March 2000. The temple was inaugurated on 7 July 2002.

In 2017, the state of North Rhine-Westphalia granted the operating association the status of a Körperschaft des öffentlichen Rechts (corporation under public law), making it one of the first Hindu organisations in Germany to receive such recognition.

On 29 May 2026 the temple was re-consecrated following several months of renovation. Siva Sri Arumugam Paskarakurukkal performed the religious rites on the kalashas, and was accompanied by priests from abroad. The Westfälischer Anzeiger reported that approximately 400 people attended. This ceremony is performed every twelve years.

== Architecture ==
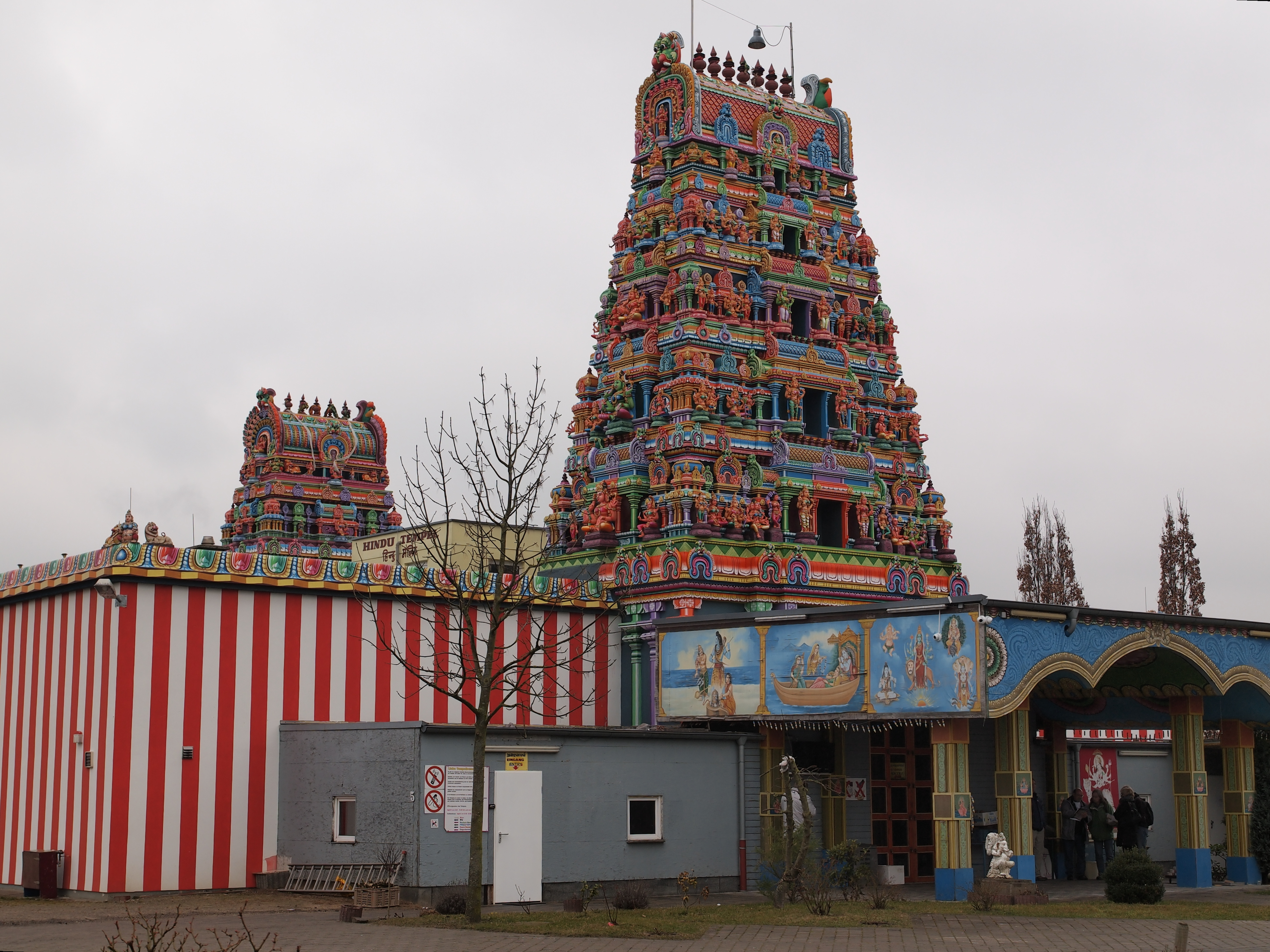

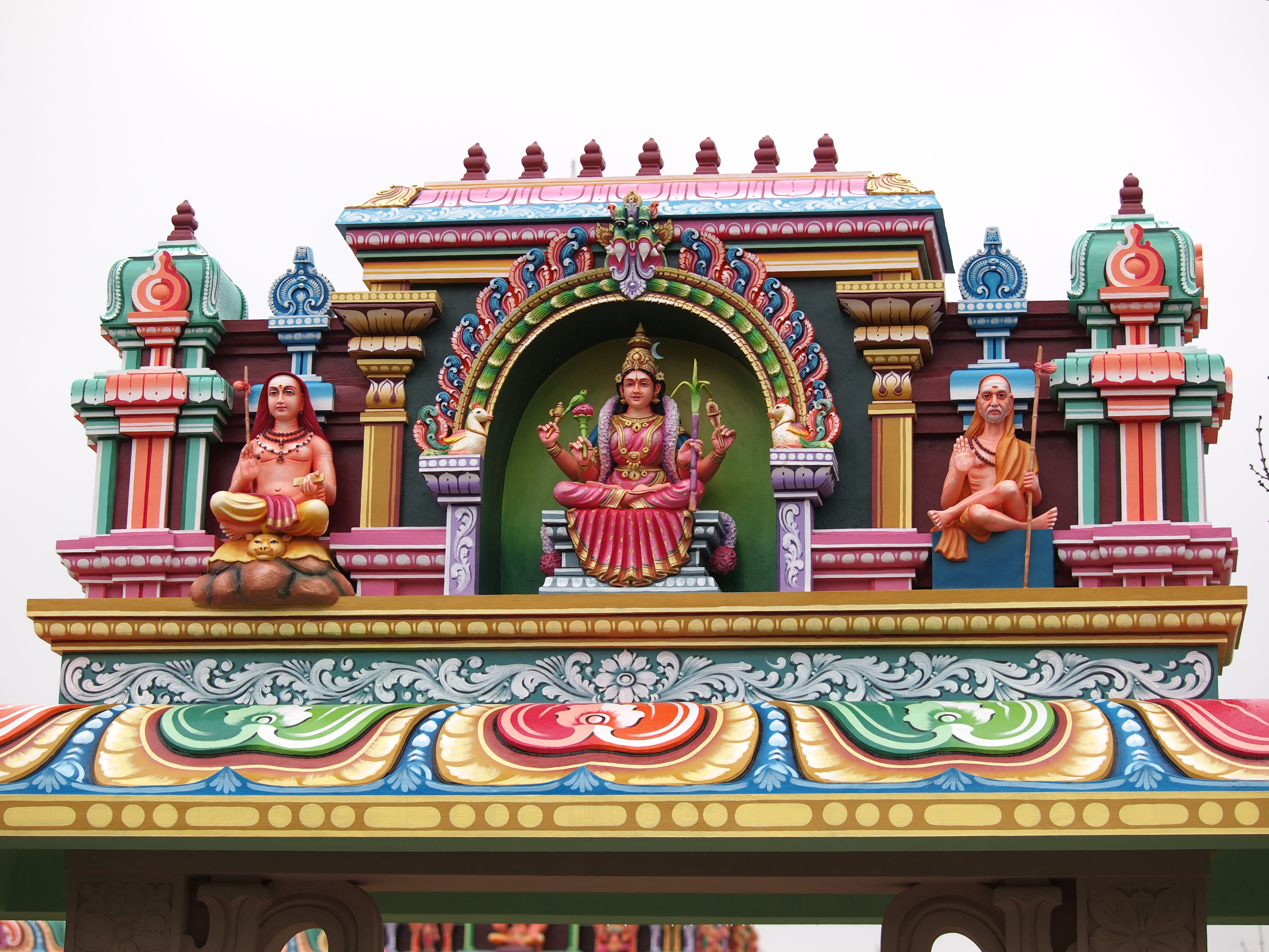

The temple was designed by local Hamm architect Heinz-Rainer Eichhorst in close collaboration with South Indian specialists. The temple was modeled on the Kamakshi Amman Temple in Kanchipuram, Tamil Nadu. Construction of the main hall cost roughly €1.5–1.7 million and was financed through donations from local Tamil worshippers. Craftsmen from India executed the sculptural program. The temple has a square footprint of 27 × 27 metres (729 m²). Its exterior is striped red and white in the South Indian style, the main entrance gopuram stands about 17 m tall, facing a smaller tower (vimana). More than 200 sculpted figures of deities adorn the building, and there are subsidiary shrines, including to Ganesha and Murugan. The industrial setting was chosen for reasons of cost, access and parking, and proximity to the canal which is used in festival rites.

== Deity ==
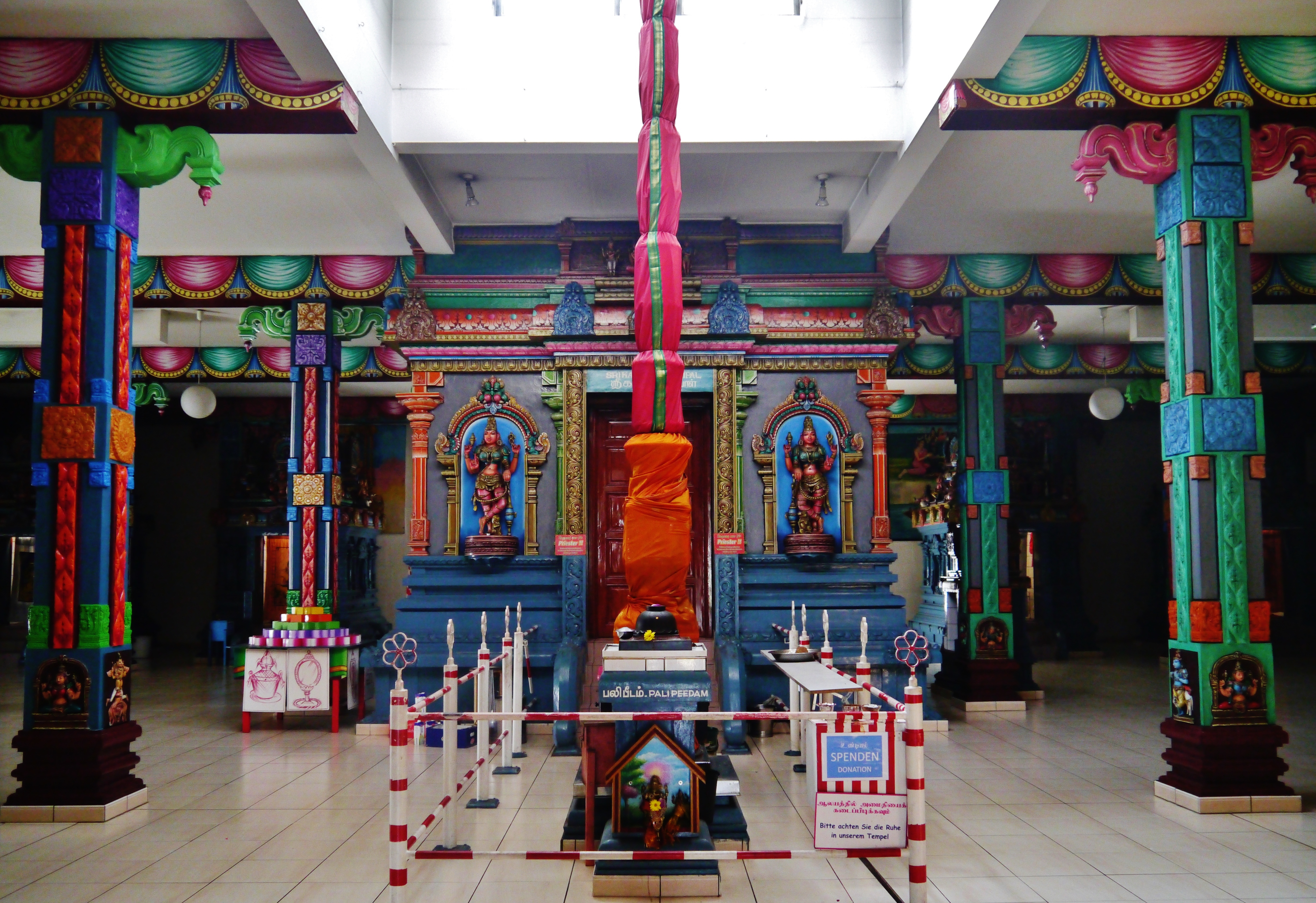

The temple is dedicated to the deity Kamakshi (Tamil: காமாட்சி, Kāmāṭci; Sanskrit: कामाक्षी, Kāmākṣī), a form of the Hindu goddess associated with the Kamakshi temple at Kanchipuram in Tamil Nadu. Her name is commonly interpreted as meaning 'she of loving eyes'. The goddess is shown seated in the lotus posture with four arms.

== Significance ==
The temple is regarded in the academic literature as an important example of Hindu institution-building among Sri Lankan Tamil refugees in Germany. The religious-studies scholar Martin Baumann presents the temple as a key site through which displaced Tamils have re-established religious practice and community life in their new society. Brigitte Luchesi has examined the temple’s annual festival as part of an emerging tradition of Tamil Hindu public processions in Germany. She notes that these events have served as a means for a refugee minority to claim a visible presence in public space.

It is included on the Ruhr region’s Route der Industriekultur heritage route and features in the Landschaftsverband Westfalen-Lippe’s documentation of post-war religious architecture. The city of Hamm promotes it as a local tourist attraction.

== See also ==
- Hinduism in Germany
- Sri Lankan Tamils
- Hinduism Europe
- Siva Sri Paskarakurukkal
