= Subri =

Subri may refer to

- Kovai Subri (1898–1993), Tamil freedom fighter
- Mohd Faiz Subri (born 1987), Malaysian football midfielder
- Subri Lake in Pakistan
