= Ramakrishna's influence =

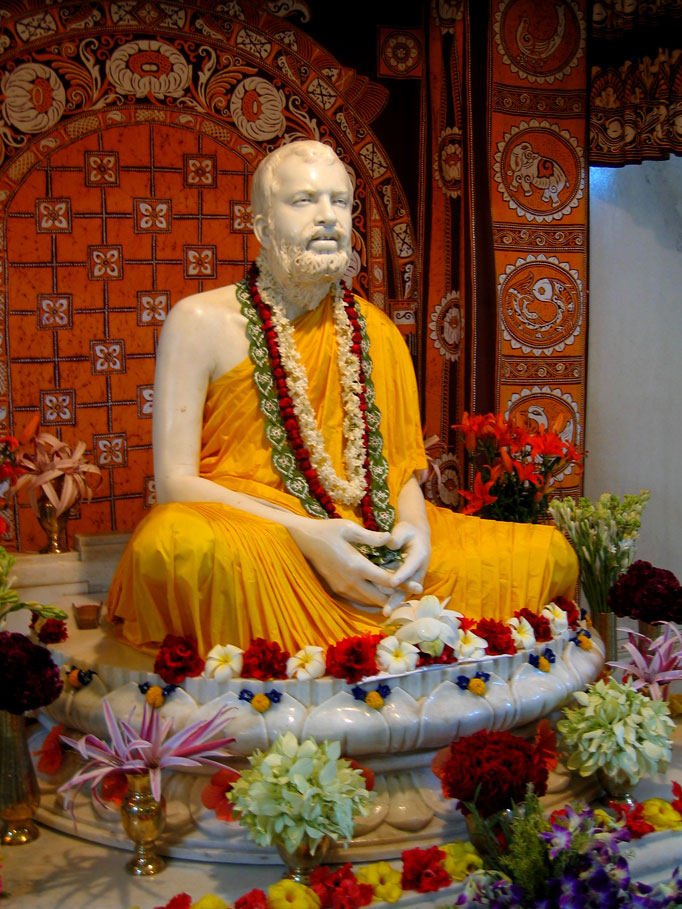
The marble statue of Ramakrishna at Belur Math

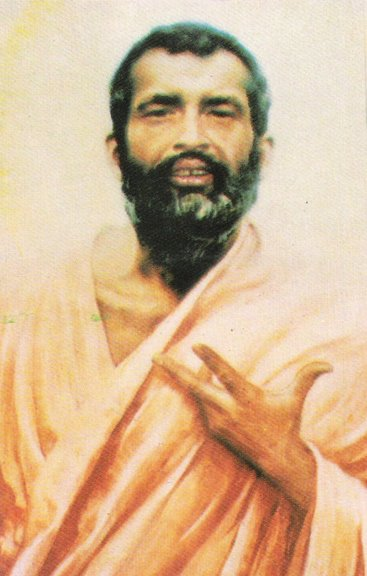
Portrait by František Dvořák

Ramakrishna (1836–1886) was an Indian Bengali Hindu mystic. Born as he was during a social upheaval in Bengal in particular and India in general, Ramakrishna and his movement—Ramakrishna Mission—played a leading role in the modern revival of Hinduism in India, and on modern Indian history.

== On Hinduism ==
Ramakrishna and his chief disciple Swami Vivekananda are regarded as two of the key figures in the Bengal Renaissance of 19th century. Ramakrishna played a leading role in the modern revival of Hinduism in India and the movement—Ramakrishna Mission—his inspiration has deeply influenced modern Indian history. Ramakrishna is also regarded as an influential figure on Keshab Chandra Sen and other Brahmos and on the elite of Calcutta, the bhadralok. Ramakrishna advocated bhakti and the Bhagavad Gita occupies an important place in his discourses. Ramakrishna preferred "the duality of adoring a Divinity beyond himself to the self-annihilating immersion of nirvikalpa samadhi", and he helped "bring to the realm of Eastern energetics and realisation the daemonic celebration that the human is always between a reality it has not yet attained and a reality to which it is no longer limited." He was given a name that is from the Vaishnavite tradition (Rama and Krishna are both incarnations of Vishnu), but was a devotee of Kali, the mother goddess, and known to have followed or practiced various other religious paths including Tantrism, Christianity, and Islam.

== On Indian nationalism ==
Rabindranath Tagore, Aurobindo Ghosh, and Mahatma Gandhi, have acknowledged Ramakrishna and Vivekananda's contribution to Indian Nationalism. This is particularly evident in Ramakrishna’s development of the Mother-symbolism and its eventual role in defining the incipient Indian nationalism.

== Vivekananda, Ramakrishna Math and Ramakrishna Mission ==
Vivekananda, Ramakrishna’s most illustrious disciple, is considered by some to be one of his most important legacies. Vivekananda spread the message of Ramakrishna across the world. He also helped introduce Hinduism to the West. He founded two organisations based on the teachings of Ramakrishna. One was Ramakrishna Mission, which is designed to spread the word of Ramakrishna. Vivekananda also designed its emblem. Ramakrishna Math was created as a monastic order based on Ramakrishna’s teachings.

The temples of Ramakrishna are called the Universal Temples. The first Universal Temple was built at Belur, which is the headquarters of the Ramakrishna Mission.

== Works related to Ramakrishna ==
In 2006, composer Philip Glass wrote The Passion of Ramakrishna — a choral work as a "tribute to Ramakrishna". It premiered on 16 September 2006 at the Orange County Performing Arts Center in Costa Mesa, California, performed by Orange County’s Pacific Symphony Orchestra conducted by Carl St. Clair with the Pacific Chorale directed by John Alexander. František Dvořák (1862–1927), a painter from Prague, inspired by the teachings of Ramakrishna made several paintings of Ramakrishna and Sarada Devi.
