= R. Ramasubbier =

Indian politician

R. Ramasubbier was an Indian politician who served as a member of the Madras Legislative Council for two consecutive terms from 1892 to 1894.
