= Subramaniam V. Iyer =

Subramaniam Vishwanathan Iyer
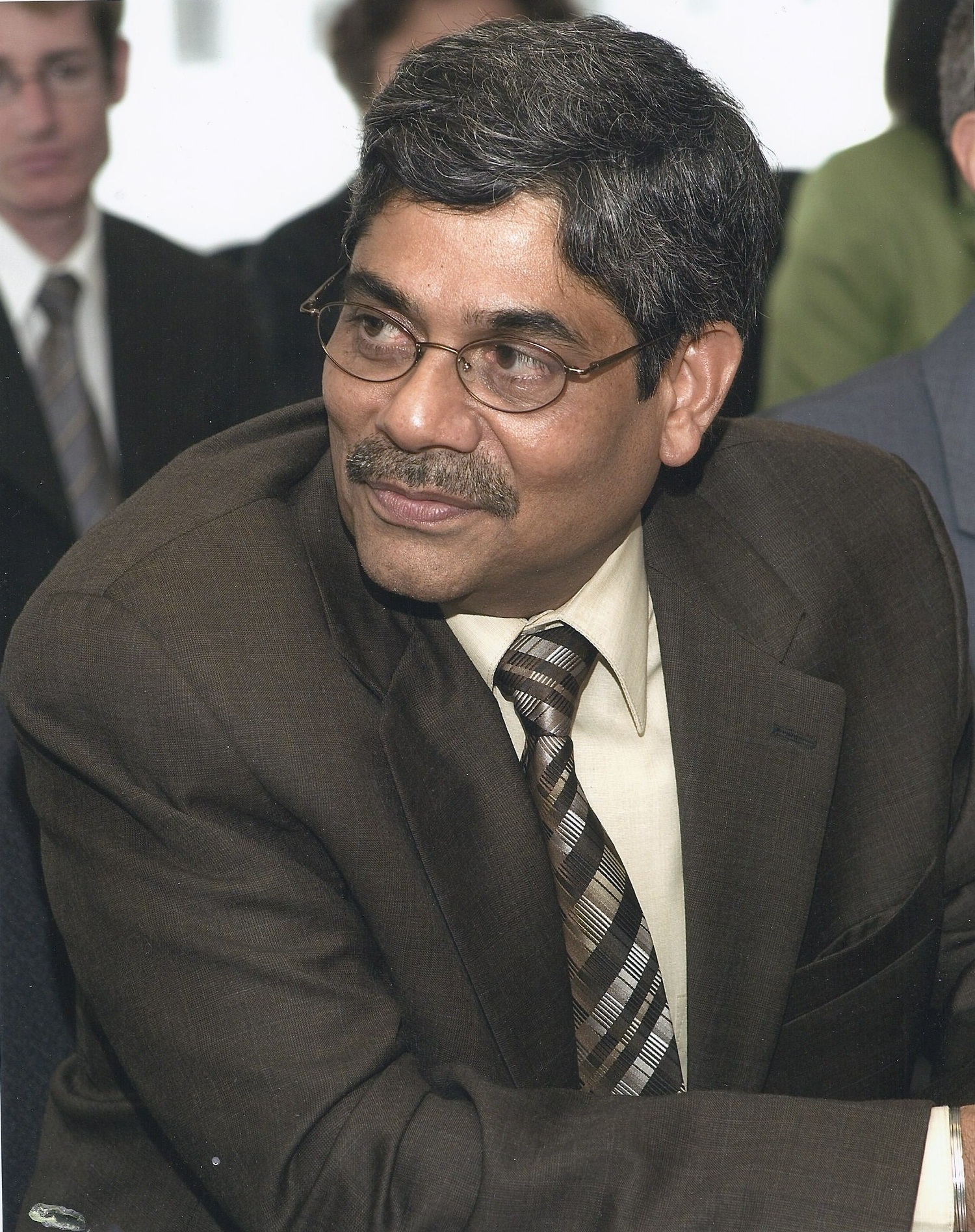

Vice President and COO, Multilateral Investment Guarantee Agency

Former Managing Director, Rio Tinto India

Personal details
- Born: 25 December 1957 (age 68) Jabalpur, India
- Education: Jabalpur University; Yale School of Management

Subramaniam Vishwanathan Iyer (born 25 December 1957), also known as S. "Vijay" Iyer, is the vice president and chief operating officer of the Multilateral Investment Guarantee Agency, the former managing director of Rio Tinto India, and had previously served as Director of Energy and Sustainable Development at the World Bank Group.

Iyer holds an MS in chemistry from Jabalpur University and a Masters in Management from the Yale School of Management.

== Career ==
=== Rio Tinto India ===
As managing director of Rio Tinto India, Iyer focused on strengthening the company's position in India and consolidating its operations. He brought a pronounced focus on sustainability and safety, building partnerships with other companies and more broadly within the Indian Mining Industry. As senior vice president of the Federation of Indian Mineral Industries (FIMI) and the chair of its Sustainability Mining Initiative, Iyer promoted sustainability initiatives and efforts aimed at lifting the public perception of mining in the country.

=== World Bank Group ===
==== Sustainable Energy for All ====
Iyer's primary focus as Energy Director of the World Bank Group was increasing access to clean energy for the poor through collaboration between the public and private sectors, primarily in Sub-Saharan Africa. Notable projects include the Bangladesh Solar Initiative, which provided solar power to over 2 million rural homes which were previously without electricity and lighting. Additionally, Iyer worked to increase electrification for thousands of rural poor in Senegal, Ethiopia, and Tanzania, and also implemented several biomass energy projects

==== Criticism ====
Despite the bank's efforts to increase electrification, Iyer drew criticism from environmental policy advocates in 2014 for asserting that fossil fuels are a viable option to increase electrification for Africa's poor. In response, Iyer maintained that renewable options were cost prohibitive for many regions in Africa that had no access to energy, and that in order for these cost barriers to be removed, the economic growth that results from initial electrification must first be realized.

=== District Collector Indore ===
Prior to joining the World Bank, Iyer served as District collector through the Indian Administrative Service in the city of Indore in Madhya Pradesh, India. During his term as Collector, Iyer worked to enhance government transparency, eliminate corruption in the police force, and restore historic sites in the greater Indore area.
