= Krishna Gopalayyan =

Indian administrator

Krishna Gopalayyan was an Indian administrator who served as the Diwan of Travancore from 1768 to 1776.
