= Hansadutta Swami =

German-American spiritual leader

His Grace Hansadutta Das
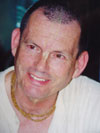
- Hansadutta in 1996

Personal life
- Born: Hans Jürgen Kary; 27 May 1941 Brunswick, Germany
- Died: 25 April 2020 (aged 78) California, U.S.

Religious life
- Religion: Hinduism
- Philosophy: Achintya Bheda Abheda
- Lineage: Brahma-Madhva-Gauḍīya Sampradāya
- Sect: Gauḍīya Vaiṣṇavavāda
- Monastic name: Hamsaduta Svāmī
- Ordination: Gauḍīya Sannyāsa, by Bhaktivedānta Swāmī
- Initiation: Gauḍīya Vaiṣṇava Dikṣa; US by Bhaktivedānta Swāmī

Religious career
- Teacher: Bhaktivedānta Swāmī
- Post: ISKCON Sannyasin, ISKCON Guru-Ācārya, ISKCON Governing Body Commissioner
- Period in office: 1977–83
- Predecessor: Bhaktivedānta Swāmī

Hansadutta Das (IAST: Haṁsadūta dāsa), formerly Hansadutta Swami (Haṁsadūta Svāmī), born 27 May 1941 died 25 April 2020), was a Gaudiya Vaishnava spiritual leader. An early member of, and later guru in, the International Society for Krishna Consciousness (ISKCON), he was one of the senior disciples of ISKCON founder A. C. Bhaktivedanta Swami Prabhupada.

He was born Hans Jürgen Kary and also known by the alias Jack London.

== Early disciple of A. C. Bhaktivedanta Swami ==
Hansadutta became an initiated disciple of A. C. Bhaktivedanta Swami a.k.a. Srila Prabhupada in March 1967.

He assisted with the pioneering of the Hare Krishna movement, opening centers and preaching in Canada: Montreal and Vancouver; Europe: Germany, Switzerland, Sweden, Denmark, Russia; in US: Boston, Berkeley; and in Asia: Turkey, Cairo, Afghanistan, Nepal, India, Sri Lanka, Philippines, Singapore and Malaysia.

He was one of the leaders in publication (printing and distribution) of A.C. Bhaktivedanta Swami's books, particularly in European languages, heading up the sales of books in Germany and North Europe, and in 1974 was appointed by A.C. Bhaktivedanta Swami to serve as lifetime trustee of the Bhaktivedanta Book Trust. He was also appointed as a member of ISKCON's Governing Body Commission, and took turns serving as A.C. Bhaktivedanta Swami's personal secretary. In 1976 Hansadutta took up the order of sannyasa.

While preaching in Sri Lanka in the year 1977, Hansadutta created a public sensation with his answer to a challenge by Dr. Abraham T. Kovoor, president of the Sri Lanka branch of the Rationalist Association, which exchange was published in the Colombo (Sri Lanka) Sunday Times. A.C. Bhaktivedanta Swami approved Hansadutta's proposal to print the exchange and instructed that it should be included in his own publication titled "Life Comes from Life".

== ISKCON Guru ==
In July 1977, Hansadutta was one of eleven disciples named by Bhaktivedanta Swami to act as "ritviks" (Vedic priests), or "initiating acaryas", who would initiate new disciples. Four months after Bhaktivedanta Swami died on 14 November 1977, as part of ISKCON's Zonal Acharya system, Hansadutta began initiating disciples primarily within zones assigned to him, namely North America, Sri Lanka, Malaysia and Philippines.

== Expelled from ISKCON ==
In 1980, Hansadutta was arrested for possession of illegal weapons. On 8 July 1983, the Governing Body Commission of ISKCON passed a resolution demoting Hansadutta from sannyasa and taking away his responsibilities in ISKCON.

== Ritvik representative of the Acharya ==
In 1993, Hansadutta published a collection of essays, letters and articles under the title Srila Prabhupada, His Movement and You, in which he presented arguments and evidence in support of continuation of the parampara (disciplic succession) as a "ritvik", or representative, of Bhaktivedanta Swami. At this time Hansadutta redirected all his former "disciples" to regard Bhaktivedanta Swami as their spiritual master, and began to initiate new disciples on behalf of Bhaktivedanta Swami, as "ritvik representative of the Acharya".

== BBT court case ==
In 1997, Bhaktivedanta Book Trust International, Inc. and ISKCON of California, Inc. initiated legal action against Hansadutta, seeking court declaration that Bhaktivedanta Swami's Bhaktivedanta Book Trust (California, 1972) was not a legal entity and/or Hansadutta was not a legal trustee of the Bhaktivedanta Book Trust. On 13 November 1998, Hansadutta agreed to a stipulated court settlement that effectively terminated any claims he might have had to being a trustee of the Bhaktivedanta Book Trust conditional upon receipt of an undisclosed cash settlement and license to publish the original, unrevised books of Bhaktivedanta Swami.

== Personal life ==
Hansadutta's parents immigrated from Germany to the United States when he was nine or ten years old. Hansadutta was raised in New York City. At the age of 17, he joined the Navy, where he served from 1957 to 1961. In the early 1960s he and his first wife, Himavati devi dasi, were aspiring artists living in Hoboken, New Jersey, when they met Hare Krishna devotees at 26, Second Avenue on the Lower East Side of Manhattan. In March, 1967 Hansadutta and Himavati moved to Montreal to assist with establishing the Hare Krishna center, and in May of the same year they were initiated by His Divine Grace A.C. Bhaktivedanta Swami Prabhupada, ISKCON Founder-Acharya, in New York. In 1976 Hansadutta took the order of sannyasa, and Himavati remarried a few years later. In 1984, Hansadutta married Lakshmi Kary, with whom he had three children. They later divorced. In 2003, Hansadutta suffered a heart attack. On 25 April 2020, Hansadutta died from pancreatic cancer.

== Publications ==
Books: --

- 1983 - The Hammer for Smashing Illusion, based on a translation of "Moha-Mudgara Stotra", more popularly known as "Bhaja Govinda" by Shankaracharya.
- 1984 - Kirtan: Ancient Medicine for Modern Man.
- 1985 - Fool's Paradise, ISBN 0-933593-05-8-(pbk).
- 1985 - The Book: What the Black Sheep Said, ISBN 0-933593-03-1-(pbk).

Papers, Compilations of Essays, Letters and Discussions: The following papers by Hansadutta address controversies in ISKCON, namely the ritvik controversy, Hansadutta's own alleged excommunication from ISKCON, and the influence of Narayan Maharaja of the Gaudiya Math on ISKCON members: --

- 1993 - Srila Prabhupada, His Movement and You
- 1993 - Excommunicated, Uncommunicated, Incommunicado
- 1994 - Gopimania

== Discography ==
Hansadutta recorded and produced a number of LPs and singles featuring Hare Krishna songs while in Germany, c. 1974, including the album "KRSNA Meditation" with vocals by His Divine Grace A.C. Bhaktivedanta Swami, which was recorded in a makeshift studio at Schloss Rettershof near Frankfurt, Germany. Later, in 1978 he produced an LP cover "Nothing to Lose But All To Gain". The LP cover "Nice but Dead" followed some time in 1981. The title seems to be a reference to the body, described as "nice but dead": according to Krishna teachings, notably Bhagavad Gita As It Is, only the soul is alive, while the body is at best "nice but dead". Production reportedly cost $35,000. The cover has been described as "a collection of guitar accompanied potshots at other gurus". In or around 1982, Hansadutta recorded and produced the LP cover "The Vision". The tracks are listed as:

- A1 The Vision 4:15
- A2 Protoplasmic Crud 3:22
- A3 Judas Goat 3:45
- A4 Oh Saragrati Vaisnava Soul 6:42
- B1 You're So Wise 4:17
- B2 Deluding Maya 3:54
- B3 Think Before You Drink 4:40
- B4 Srila Praphupada Is Your Name

These three covers generally fall into the category of country rock, funk, and folk and were of limited release.
