= Sacinandana Swami =

German Gaudiya Vaishnava guru and sannyasi

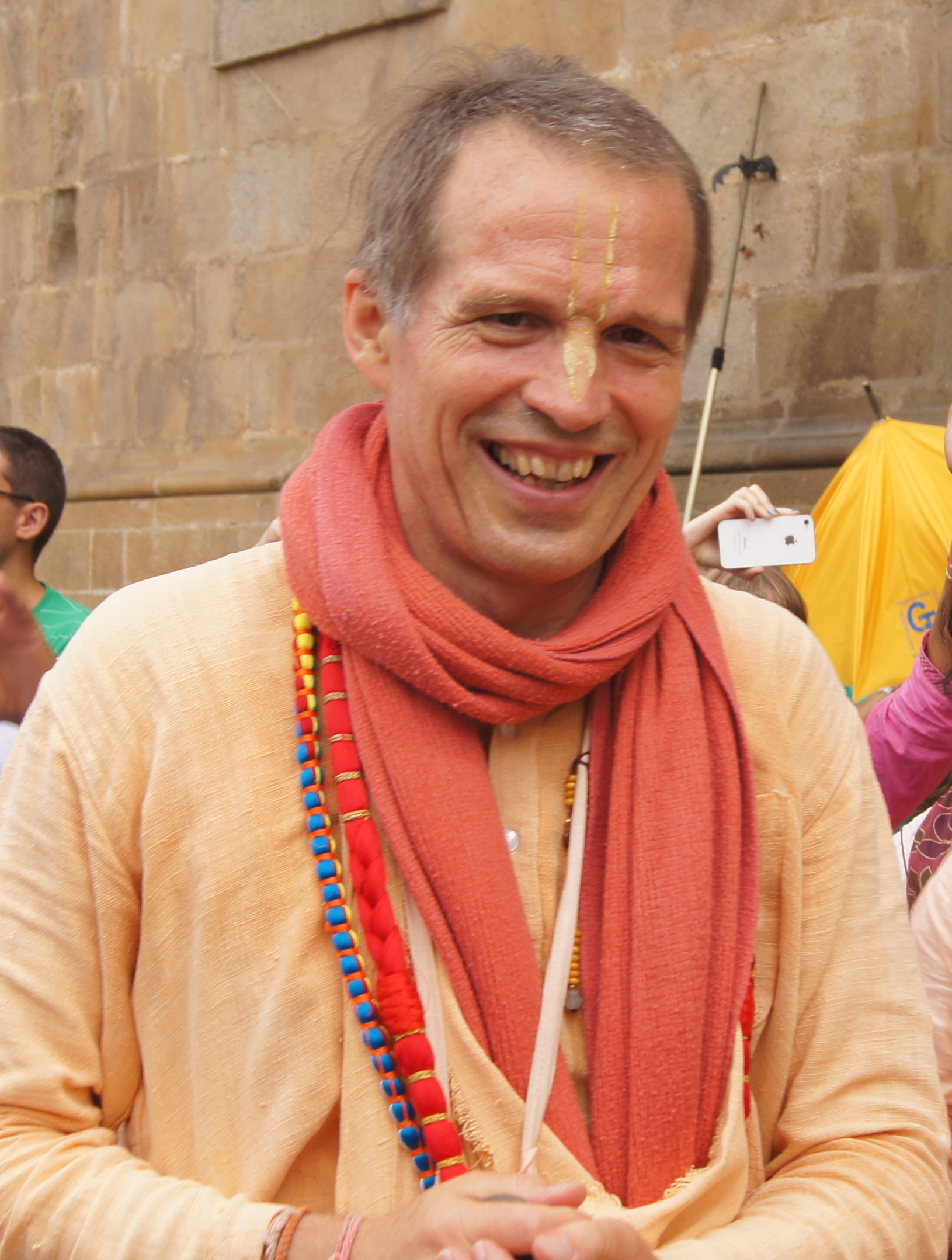
- Sacinandana Swami in 2012

Personal life
- Born: 1954 (age 71–72) Hamburg, West Germany
- Other name: Thorsten Pettersson
- Website: saranagati.net

Religious life
- Religion: Hinduism
- Initiation: Diksa–1972, Sannyasa–1989

Religious career
- Post: ISKCON Guru, Sannyasi

Sachinandana Swami (IAST: Śacī-nandana Svāmī; born 1954) is a Gaudiya Vaishnava guru, sannyasi, and one of the religious leaders of the International Society for Krishna Consciousness (commonly known as the Hare Krishnas or ISKCON).

== Biography ==
Of German origin, he joined ISKCON in 1970 and was initiated by the movement's founder, A. C. Bhaktivedanta Swami Prabhupada, in 1971. Sacinandana Swami is well known throughout ISKCON for his kirtana and public speaking. He teaches and writes prolifically on Vaishnavism and the Hare Krishna movement and has translated the Bhagavad Gita into German. His publications include The Nectarean Ocean of the Holy Name, The Gayatri Book, The Way of the Great Departure, The Art of Transformation, Spiritual Tonic, and The Living Name.

Sacinandana Swami first came in contact with Gaudiya Vaishnavism after seeing Hare Krishna devotees on German TV in the late 1960s. He later noted:

"One day, I remember it was in television. I was a fan of the Rolling Stones. One of the members, the guitarist, had died from an overdose of drugs. I cried tears – my model had died. After this, an exciting new group, the Radha Krishna Temple, came on and sang the Hare Krishna mantra. I immediately felt deep solace." –Sacinandana Swami

In 1970, a 16-year-old boy at the time, Sacinandana Swami "set off to introduce himself to the Hare Krishna community in Germany and began the life of learning, teaching and traveling that he continues to this day". In 1987 he became an initiating guru in ISKCON, and in 1989 took sannyasa. Sacinandana Swami has made a number pilgrimages to holy places in India, often travelling to Vrindavan for intensive 'japa' retreats. He also visited Badrinath, Kedarnath, Gangotri, Mount Kailash, Ahobilam, Srirangam, Melukote, and Tirupati throughout his travels.

In terms of educational development within ISKCON, Sacinandana Swami has conducted classes at the Vaisnava Institute for Higher Education and the Bhaktivedanta College project at Radhadesh. He also serves as the spiritual director of the Veda Academy, an internationally recognised university of Vedic sciences, arts, and philosophy active in eight countries.

In September 2009 Sacinandana Swami toured Bosnia and Herzegovina, Croatia and Serbia with American kirtan artist Krishna Das. In a TV interview in Bosnia and Herzegovina, Krishna Das said, "You know my friend Sacinandana Swami, we were talking a few years ago and I knew he travels through here often and I just wanted to come. So I said 'Let's go! Let's organise a tour.' I didn't think about it, you know. I just felt it would be great to come here, it would be a wonderful thing, so here we are."

== Bibliography ==
English

- Śacīnandana Swami The Gāyatrī Book. – 1st ed. – Vasati Verlag, 2005. – 340 p. – ISBN 978-3-937238-05-0
- Śacīnandana Swami The Art of Transformation. – Śaraṇāgati Publishing, 2005. – 86 p.
- Śacīnandana Swami Spiritual Tonic: Bhakti-rasayana. — Śaraṇāgati Publishing, 2006. — 164 p.
- Śacīnandana Swami The Nectarean Ocean of the Holy Name. — 2nd ed. — Śaraṇāgati Publishing, 2006. — 295 p.
- Śacīnandana Swami Nama Rahasya – The Confidential Secrets of Chanting the Holy Name in Perfection. — Śaraṇāgati Publishing, 2008. — 120 p.

German

- Śacīnandana Swami Der Nektarozean des Heiligen Namens. — Veda Akademy Verlag, 1997. — 248 p. — ISBN 3-932973-02-X
- Śacīnandana Swami Der Weg des großen Abschieds. Aus dem Tagebuch einer Pilgerreise in den Himalaja. — Gayatri Verlag, 1999. — 168 p. — ISBN 3-00-003904-X
- Śacīnandana Swami Der Weg des großen Abschieds. Aus dem Tagebuch einer Pilgerreise in den Himalaja. — 2., überarb. Aufl. — The Bhaktivedanta Book Trust, 2000. – 206 p. – ISBN 91-7149-431-6
- Śacīnandana Swami & Marcus Schmieke Das große Praxisbuch der Mantras: Nutzen Sie die Kraft spirituellen Klangs. — Freiburg: Nietsch, 2007. — 220 p. — ISBN 3-939570-01-X

Russian

- Шачинандана Свами Путь великих прощаний. Дневник паломника в Гималаи. — М.: Бхактиведанта Бук Траст, 2004. — 221 с. — 5000 экз. — ISBN 5-902284-07-4
- Шачинандана Свами Океан нектара святого имени. — 2-е изд. — М: Философская книга, 2003. — 368 с. — ISBN 5-8205-0039-3

Italiano

- Śacīnandana Swami. L'arte della trasformazione, Pixartprinting (VE), 2013, 75 p.
- Śacīnandana Swami. Nāma Rahasya. I segreti confidenziali per una perfetta recitazione del santo nome, Birografika Bori, 2014, 112 p.
