= Kovai Subri =

Indian revolutionary

Kovai Subri Iyer
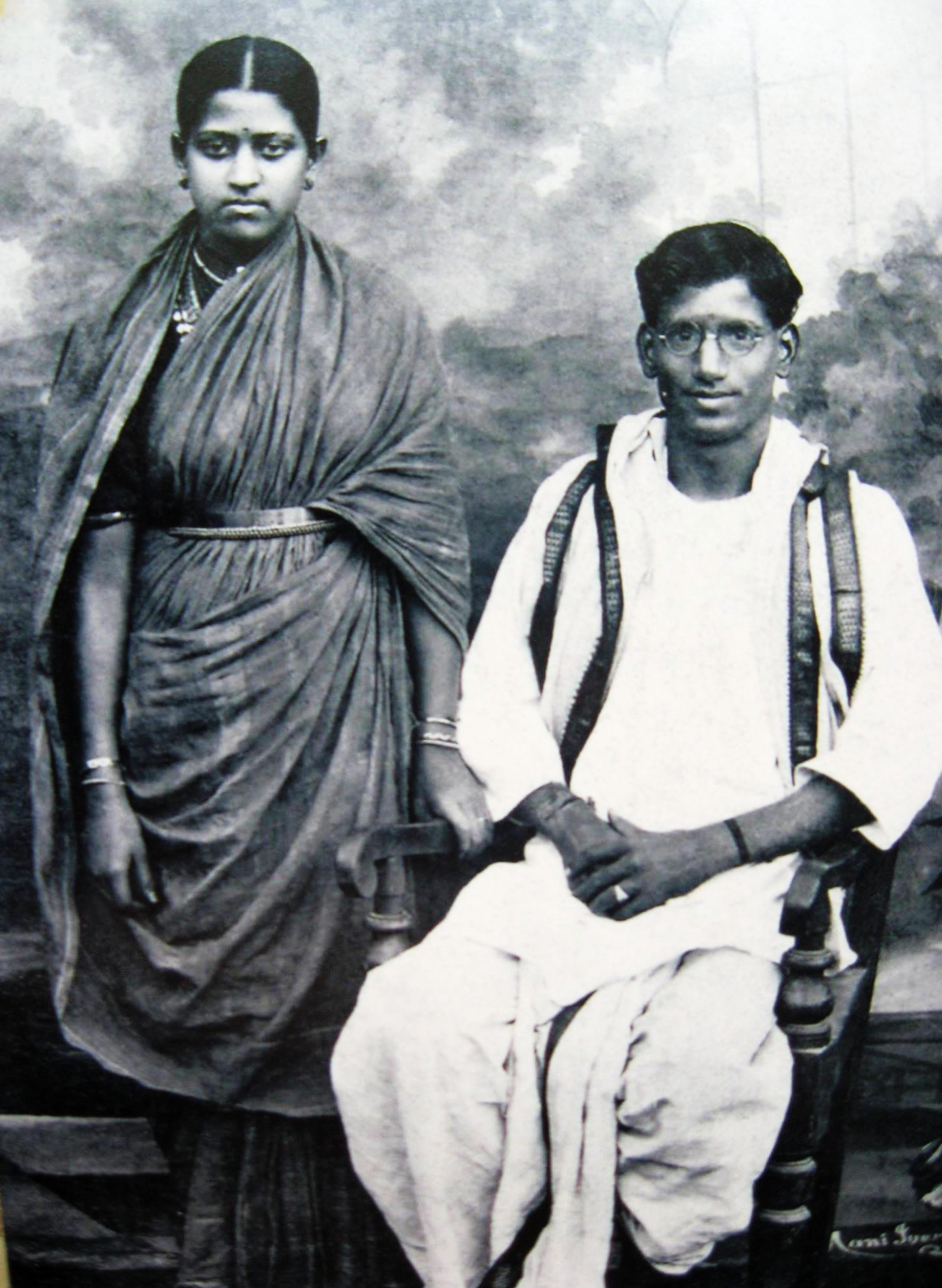
- Portrait of Kovai Subri with his wife Kamala
- Born: 20 April 1898
- Died: 1993 (aged 94–95)
- Occupations: Revolutionary leader, freedom fighter, political activist
- Movement: Indian Independence Movement

Kovai Subri (also K. Subramaniam and Soobri) was a Tamil revolutionary and freedom fighter during the Indian Independence Movement.

== Early life ==
Kovai Subri was born in Coimbatore in 1898. He was the fifth child of Parvathi and S.V.R. Krishna Iyer, an advocate in Coimbatore and was named Subramaniam, after the deity at Chennimalai. During his early years, Subri was drawn to the ideals of Gandhiji and decided to quit college to join the Indian Independence Movement.

== Freedom Struggle ==
At the age of 23, Subri joined the Town Congress Committee in Coimbatore as the secretary in 1921. Shortly afterwards, in 1923, he was imprisoned for a year for his participation in the Flag Satyagraha civil disobedience movement in Nagpur. In 1930, he joined the Salt Satyagraha. He was later imprisoned on five more occasions and spent a total of 5 years of his life in prison. He would later go on to start a Khadi centre at Padiyur village in Uthukuli.

Gandhiji affectionately referred to Subri as 'The loudspeaker' for his commanding voice as his translator for his public speeches during his tour of the Coimbatore and Nilgiris Districts. Gandhiji in an article in the Young India writes about Subri- "young and old, men and women dote on him. The secret is his childlike innocence and his spirit of service. He is a jewel of a young man. I would do anything if only to please Soobri.".

Noted freedom fighter, T. S. Avinashilingam Chettiar, regarded Subri as one of his closest associates in the freedom struggle and the background of the movement in Coimbatore district.

== Muruga Ganam ==
During his years in prison, Subri composed a collection of 426 devotional songs named Muruga Ganam in praise of Lord Muruga. Muruga Ganam was first published in 1980, and a CD was later released by Bharatiya Vidya Bhavan in 2011.

== Political career ==
As a member of the Congress Party, Kovai Subri served as the Municipal Chairman of Coimbatore Municipality from 1938 to 1942. During his tenure, he was instrumental in creating the Gandhi Park in the RS Puram area of the city. He was later elected as the MLA of the Coimbatore City Constituency from 1947 to 1952.

Subri later joined the Liberal Swatantra Party when it was launched by Rajaji in 1959.

== Personal life ==
On 14 November 1926, at the age of 28, Subri married Kamala (Kamalammal), the daughter of A. Natesa Iyer an advocate-cum teacher from Pollachi. Kamala joined Subri in his acts of civil disobedience and was arrested in 1930 along with their six-month-old daughter. Subri and Kamala died in 1993 exactly a week from each other.
