= Siva Sri Paskarakurukkal =

Sri Lankan Tamil priest

Shaivaite Hindu Priest Siva Sri Arumugam Paskarakurukkal
- சிவஸ்ரீ அருமுகம் பஷ்கரகுருக்கள்
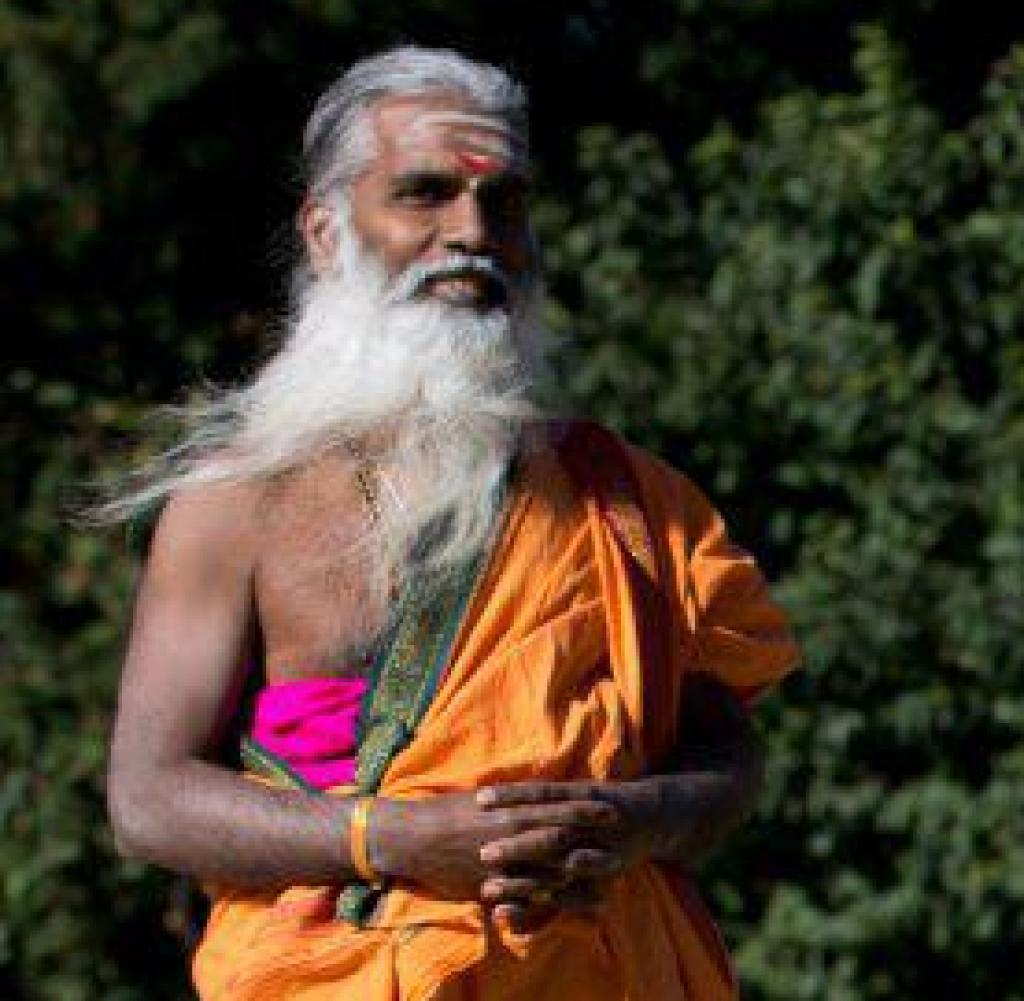
- Notable work: Hindu Temple in Germany

Siva Sri Arumugam Paskarakurukkal (Kurukkal meaning priest) is a German-based Sri Lankan Tamil priest and the present main priest of the Sri Kamadchi Ampal Temple in Hamm, the second largest Hindu temple in Europe.

== Life as young man ==
In the year 1985, Paskaran fled towards Europe and was in Kanchipuram to learn about priesthood, because of the Sri Lankan Civil War.

He learned becoming a priest in Kamakshi Amman Temple in Kanchipuram. He learned to love Kamakshi Amman and so he began worshipping her.

== Life in Germany ==
Sri Kamakshi Amman Temple Germany
- ஸ்ரீ காமாக்ஷி அம்மன் கோவில் ஜேர்மனி
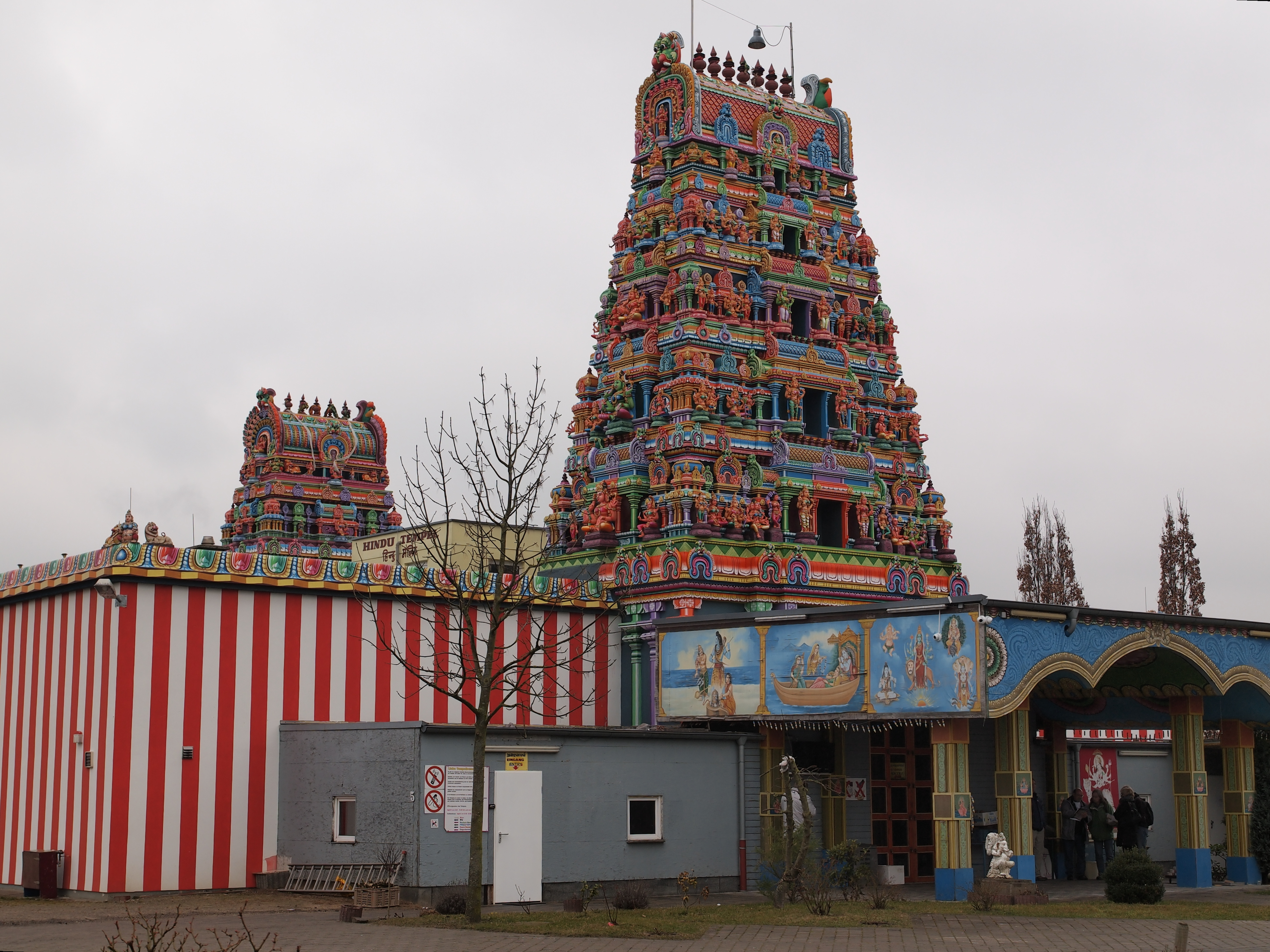
- Alternative names: Hindu Temple Hamm

General information
- Status: Completed
- Type: Hindu Temple
- Location: Siegenbeckstraße 5, 59071 Hamm, Hamm, Germany
- Construction started: 1999
- Inaugurated: 2002
- Cost: 2,000,000 EUR
- Owner: Siva Sri Arumugam Paskarakurukkal

Height
- Height: 17 m (56 ft) (gopuram)

Technical details
- Floor area: 729 m^{2} (7,850 sq ft)

Design and construction
- Architect: Heinz-Rainer Eichhorst

Website
- kamadchi-ampal.de

=== Arrival in Germany ===
As he arrived in West Germany, he applied for asylum. He could either stay in East Germany or West Germany. He chose West Germany in order to go to France, to his brother. When he got the train ticket towards France, he had nothing except the clothing he wore. In Train Station Hamm, he became hungry and thirsty, so he hopped off the train to search for food. He then found German strangers who bought him food, which later became his friends. He thinks this was a sign to stay in Germany.

=== Beginning of settling in Germany ===
His friends, the Vögedings took him into their apartment and he told them his story. He began working at a farm then worked as a dishwasher and servant in a restaurant. He learned German by interacting with the citizen. He built his first shrine in the basement of the apartment. As more and more people came to the pujas, it became louder and louder and disturbed the neighbours. He built a second shrine in an old laundry shop, which also disturbed neighbours and became too small.

=== Temple planning ===
He asked the Vögedings to help him. He wanted to build a Hindu temple in the industrial estate, as it is not so noisy there. But they did not know any architect to build it: so they opened up the telephone book and Paskaran took his finger and closed his eyes and pointed on a random name. It was: Heinz-Rainer Eichhorst. They called the architect and asked if he can build Hindu temples. Eichhorst said he could not and asked Paskaran to go to South India and visit the Kamakshi Amman Temple in Kanchipuram for 18 days to plan it. While Eichhorst was planning back home, Paskaran wanted to get married and found a woman in the refugee camp in Münster. Her name was Mathivani. Paskaran married her in 1994, where the Vögedings joined in as groomsmen. After that, Paskaran received the plans for the temple: around 4.000.000 DM (today: around 2.000.000 EUR). He could not afford it so he applied for loans. They were rejected because Paskaran had no safeties. So, he asked every person possible to donate. He raised the complete money. He bought a building ground at Siegenbeckstraße in Hamm and bought the house on the other street side to it. Eichhorst began constructing a small temporary temple right next to the house.

=== Building the new temple ===
In 1999 the first stones were laid and in 2002 the consecration happened. Back then, the gopuram was uncoloured. In 2014 the gopuram was coloured.

=== 2012 assault ===
Paskarakurukkal was attacked by five masked men in his house in Hamm-Uentrop on 9 November 2012. He and his family were tied with ropes. He was sprayed with pepper spray and was hit several times. 20 minutes after the robbers, who stole jewellery and money from the family, left the building, Paskarakurukkal's wife freed herself and called the police. The robbers also destroyed decorations and different sacred items in the nearby temple. There were no arrests.

== Other ==
=== Cultural Center for Hindus ===
Paskaran wanted to support Tamil and Hindu culture in Germany, so he is planning to build a culture center next to the temple. It is also build by Heinz-Rainer Eichhorst. It is a place for education and meditation. People can also celebrate festivals like weddings here. Non Hindus can also learn here about Hinduism in the library. The centre is still in construction. The construction started at the beginning of 2021.

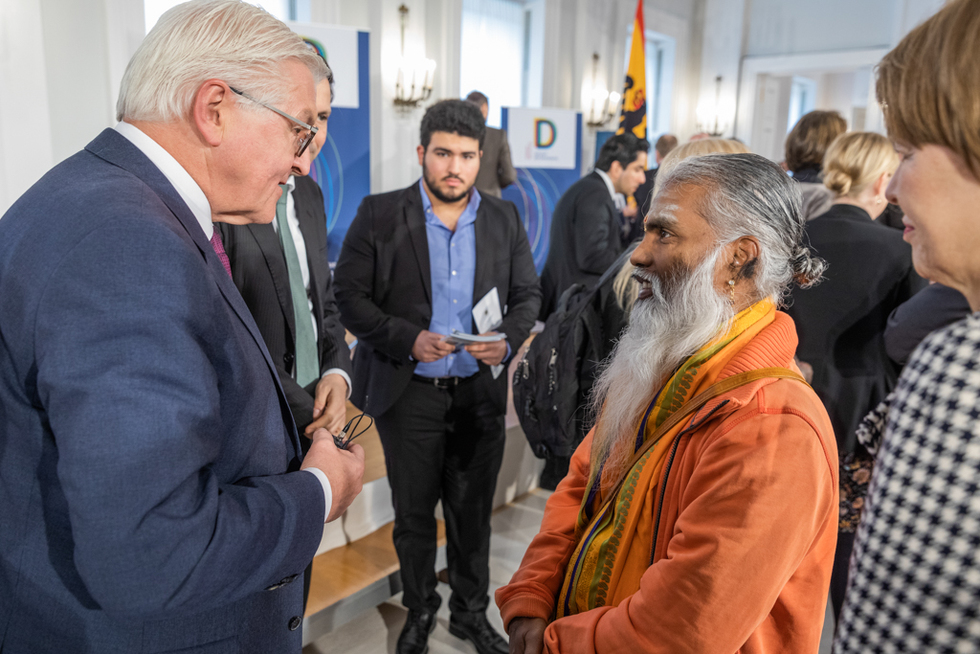
Paskaran talking with the federal president Steinmeier.

=== Hindu Funeral Site ===
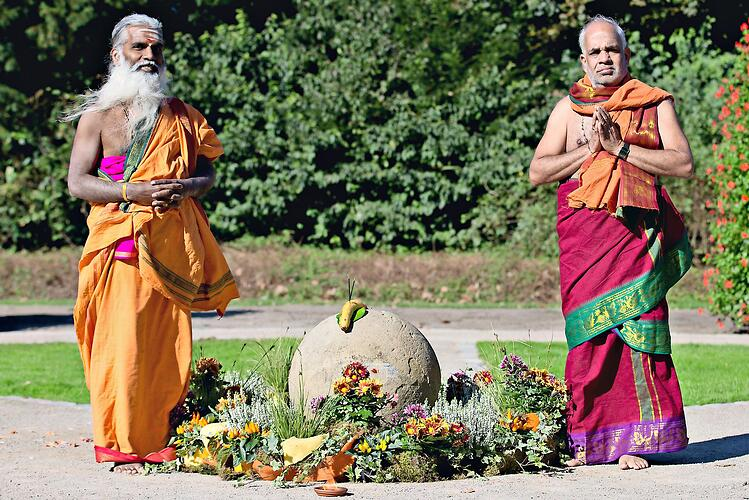
Paskaran with Jeyanthini Kurukkal (Priest of Hindu Temple in Gummersbach)

The Hindu Funeral Site in Hamm offers Hindu funerals, as per German law it is not allowed to immerse cremated ashes into water, so they are buried.
