= Satsvarupa dasa Goswami =

American poet and disciple of Bhaktivedanta Swami (born 1939)

His Holiness Satsvarūpa dāsa Goswāmī
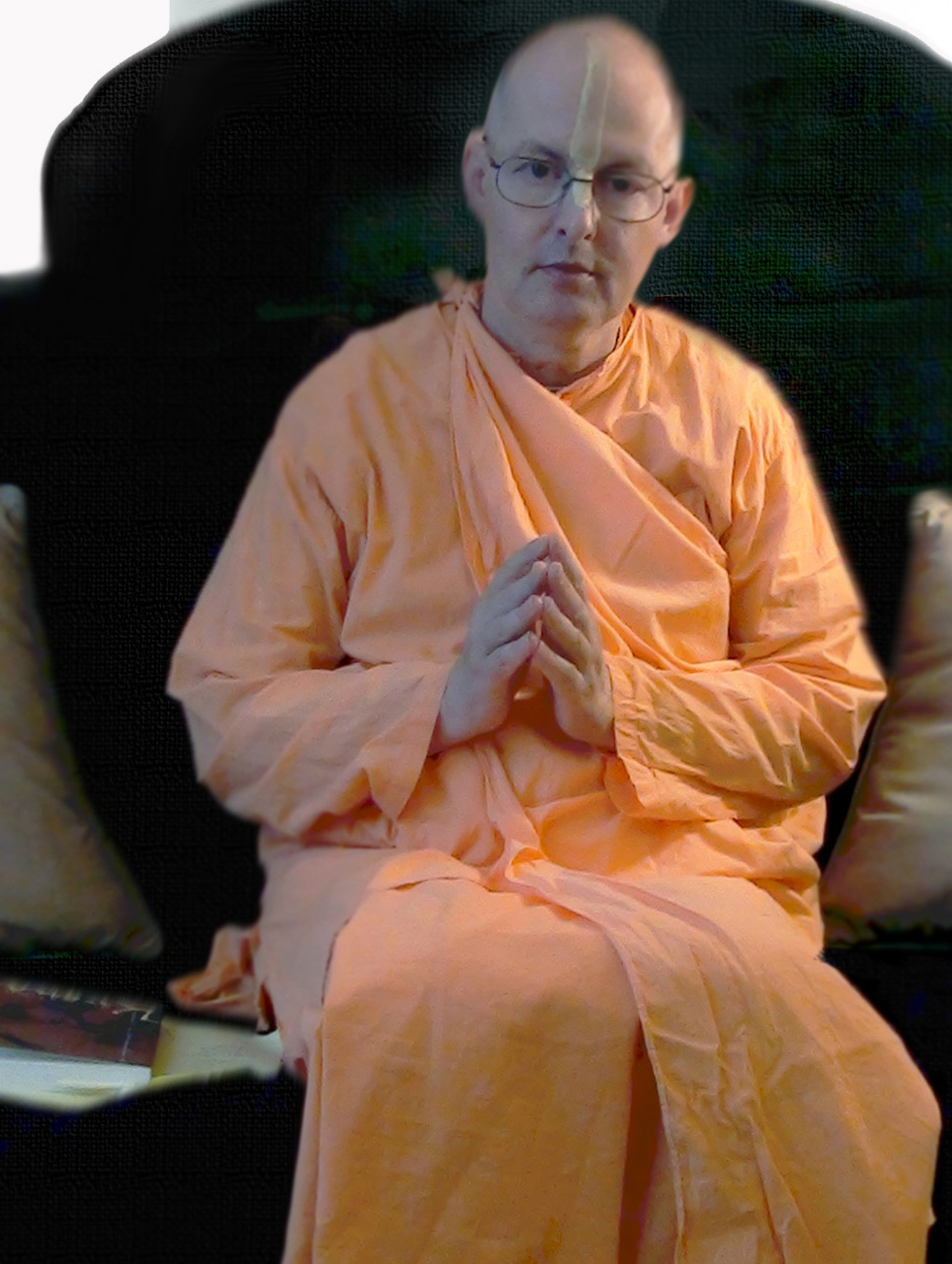
- Satsvarūpa dāsa Goswāmī
- Title: Guru

Personal life
- Born: Stephen Guarino; December 6, 1939 (age 86) New York
- Website: sdgonline.org

Religious life
- Religion: Hinduism
- Philosophy: Achintya Bheda Abheda
- Lineage: Brahma-Madhva-Gauḍīya Sampradāya
- Sect: Gauḍīya Vaiṣṇavavāda
- Monastic name: Satsvarūpa dāsa Goswāmī
- Ordination: Gauḍīya Sannyāsa, 1972, by Bhaktivedānta Swāmī
- Initiation: Gauḍīya Vaiṣṇava Dikṣa; 1966; New York, USA by Bhaktivedānta Swāmī

Religious career
- Teacher: A. C. Bhaktivedanta Swami Prabhupada
- Post: ISKCON Sannyasin, ISKCON Guru-Ācārya, ISKCON Governing Body Commissioner
- Period in office: 1972–present
- Predecessor: A. C. Bhaktivedanta Swami Prabhupada

Satsvarupa dasa Goswami (IAST: Sat-svarūpa dāsa Gosvāmī, Sanskrit: [sɐtˈsʋɐɽuːpɐ daːsɐ ɡoːˈsʋaːmiː], Devanagari: सत्स्वरूप दास गोस्वामी) (born Stephen Guarino on December 6, 1939) is a senior disciple of Bhaktivedanta Swami Prabhupada, who founded the International Society for Krishna Consciousness (ISKCON), better known in the West as the Hare Krishna movement. Serving as a writer, poet, and artist, Satsvarupa dasa Goswami is the author of Bhaktivedanta Swami's authorized biography, Srila Prabhupada-lilamrta. After Prabhupada's death, Satsvarupa dasa Goswami was one of the eleven disciples selected to initiate future disciples. Satsvarupa dasa Goswami is one of the first few Westerners ordained by Bhaktivedanta Swami in September 1966. He is a Vaishnava writer, poet, and lecturer, who published over a hundred books including poems, memoirs, essays, novels, and studies based on the Vaishnava scriptures.

== Honorifics ==
- His Holiness
- Srila Gurupada
- Paramahamsa
- Maharaja

== Early years ==
He was born Stephen Guarino, the elder of two children, to Italian Roman Catholic parents in Staten Island, New York and attended Brooklyn College.

In July 1966 he met A. C. Bhaktivedanta Swami who registered the ISKCON a month later. Bhaktivedanta Swami soon began assigning him typing tasks which Satsvarupa understood "to be yoga". On September 23, 1966, he was ordained in the new Gaudiya Vaishnava movement.

After Swami Bhaktivedanta died, he was one of eleven disciples selected to become an initiating guru in ISKCON.

== Writings ==
His writings were translated to over forty languages by the Bhaktivedanta Book Trust and Gita Nagari Press. He was also asked by Bhaktivedanta Book Trust to complete a number of works, started by A.C. Bhaktivedanta Swami. In his writings, Satsvarupa dasa Goswami advocates a lacto-vegetarian diet.

== Works ==
His books include Srila Prabhupada-Lilamrta, a biography of Prabhupada., He Lives Forever (1978) (lectures on the significance of Bhaktivedanta Swami) and five volumes of Prabhupada Nectar (1983–86) and a number of other titles. His memoir With Srila Prabhupada in the Early Days (1991) covers the early years of 1966–1969, his book Life With the Perfect Master (1983) describes the seven-month period in 1974, when he served as Bhaktivedanta's personal servant.

== Status in ISKCON ==
He became the most senior member of the movement. He was appointed as a ritvik (representative) by his preceptor. He was also one of the original members appointed as (GBC) Governing Body Commission created by Bhaktivedanta Swami in 1970 to gradually take over the management of ISKCON and was a trustee in the Bhaktivedanta's will for the management of ISKCON.

== History in ISKCON ==
=== Early days ===
After ISKCON's incorporation in July 1966 at 26 Second Avenue, Satsvarupa dasa was engaged as A. C. Bhaktivedanta Swami's personal typist and ISKCON secretary for the first year. He was one of the few devotees who maintained outside jobs to support the ISKCON temple at the beginning. Later he managed ISKCON Boston, and ISKCON Press which was later registered as Bhaktivedanta Book Trust. After assuming duties of a GBC (Governing Body Commissioner) in 1970, Satsvarupa was asked by Bhaktivedanta Swami to accept the order of sannyasa in 1972. He accepted sannyasa along with other GBC members, all of whom were originally married men, such as Tamala Krishna Goswami and Hridayananda das Goswami. At the time A.C. Bhaktivedanta Swami awarded him and other followers the title "Goswami" with the single line instruction: "Preach, preach, preach!" He has been listed among active promoters of ahimsa and vegetarianism among other Eastern religious teachers.

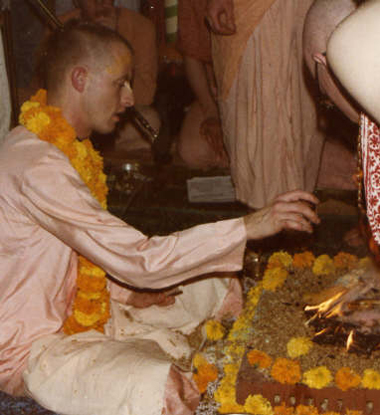
During diksa ceremony in 1979

=== Preaching and traveling ===
Main preaching activities by the means of traveling sankirtana parties were centered in United States. BBT (Bhaktivedanta Book Trust) Library Party headed by him in the mid-1970s was active in establishing distribution network mainly to the Universities of the United States, with some members of the team such as Bhakti Tirtha Swami and Suhotra Dasa traveling as far as Eastern Europe.

In 1974, Satsvarupa dasa Goswami was requested by Bhaktivedanta Swami to join him as traveling GBC servant, replacing previous servant Srutakirti Dasa and travelled as a menial servant around the globe.

=== Managing BTG ===
From the early days of ISKCON, the Back to Godhead was project required a lot of both contribution and supervision. Satsvarupa dasa Goswami was editor in chief and one of the main contributors to this magazine till 1991, when assisted editor Jayadvaita Swami took over as the editor in chief.

=== Dealing with early "zonal acarya" days ===
In accordance with ISKCON GBC Governing Body Commission resolutions March 1978 Satsvarupa dasa Goswami along with other eleven Governing Body Commissioners assumed duties and services of initiating disciples in assigned zones after the death of Bhaktivedanta Swami. Initial preaching areas in the United States and Caribbean were expanded with an addition of Ireland in 1982 where he became a zonal acharya. The assumption of equal status to Bhaktivedanta Swami and the title of "Guru-Acarya" are still surrounded in a controversy. While following the direction of Governing Body Commission, Satsvarupa dasa Goswami was one of the pioneers who attempted to reform the system, by assuming more humble and appropriate role of a guru as per recorded instructions of the "Founder-Acarya." While imitation of Bhaktivedanta Swami was criticised, despite these warnings, specifically by Satsvarupa dasa Goswami, such imitation sometimes resulted in curious side-effects and many devotees adopted Bhaktivedanta Swami's mannerisms. This remained evident especially among the older American devotees who even now speak with an Indian accent and display many of Bhaktivedanta Swami's gestures like turning one's head or moving one's hand in a certain way.

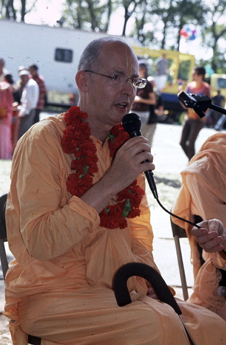
At the Houston Book Fair, 2005

=== Later years ===
In years 1978–1985 he took part in a controversial zonal acarya system in a position of an Acharya while initiating reform of a high standard of worship. In 1986–1987 a number of senior members and newly appointed GBC members with the support of Satsvarupa dasa Goswami reformed ISKCON guru system, lowering unprecedented level of worship reserved to initiating gurus in ISKCON. He was called as the "most vocal in the cause of reform" in ISKCON. Satsvarupa dasa Goswami recorded this period in his book Guru Reform Notebook (1987). Throughout the years that followed, up until the end of the century, new ISKCON guru system was further developed.

In 1999 Governing Body Commission confirmed GBC Emeritus status of his membership of the Governing Body of ISKCON.

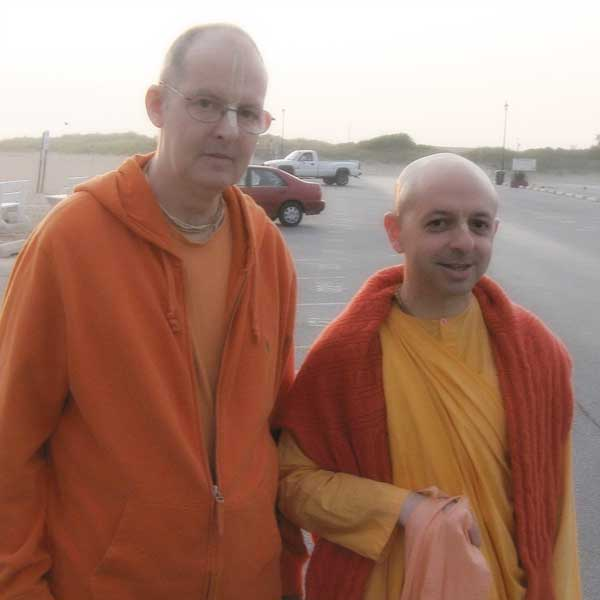
Satsvarupa dasa Goswami (left) with his disciple Yadunandana Swami, summer 2009

His extensive traveling in Europe in 1990s included areas of Scandinavia, Eastern, Central Europe and Italy, but mainly centered in preaching in Ireland and UK. In following years, his devotional life has included the creation of hundreds of paintings, drawings, and sculptures that capture and express the artist's vision of Krishna consciousness. His latest literary work is centered on his commentary on Bhagavata Purana known as A Poor Man Reads the Bhagavatam.

In 2002, he suffered a physical and emotional collapse from chronic migraine headaches, a condition that required immediate medical intervention and treatment. In consultation with the official governing body of the Krishna consciousness society, he agreed to cease initiating disciples. With the GBC consultation, he retained his Goswami title and continued in the sannyasa order and as an ISKCON guru.

Following a period of health recovery, at the age of 68, Satsvarupa dasa Goswami took residence in the East Coast United States where he is engaging in a number of preaching activities, such as regular lecturing and traveling to the holy dhamas. All of the associated preaching and traveling is complementing his main service of commenting and answering disciples' questions on the Bhaktivedanta Purports being published as the volumes of A Poor Man Reads the Bhagavatam and daily online journal.

== Select bibliography ==
- Readings in Vedic Literature: The Tradition Speaks for Itself. S.l.: Assoc Publishing Group. 1976. p. 240 pages. ISBN 978-0-912776-88-0.
- Srila Prabhupada Lilamrta Vol 1–2. Los Angeles, Calif.: Bhaktivedanta Book Trust. 2002. vol.1 1133 pages vol.2 1191 pages. ISBN 978-0-89213-357-4.
- Japa Reform Notebook. La Crosse, FL: GN Press. 1982. ISBN 978-0-911233-39-1.
- Journals and Poems vols. 1–3. 1982–1984.
- Prabhupada Lila. Potomac, Md.: Gītā-Nāgarī Press. 1983. ISBN 978-0-911233-36-0.
- Remembering Srila Prabhupada. Vol 1–4. Port Royal, PA: Gita-Nagari Press. 1983. ISBN 978-0-911233-13-1.
- Life with the Perfect Master. Port Royal, Pa.: Gita-nagari Press. June 1983. p. 111 pages. ISBN 978-0-911233-17-9.
- Vaisnava Behavior. Port Royal, PA: Gita-Nagari Press. January 1983. p. 242 pages. ISBN 978-0-911233-18-6.
- Prabhupada Nectar Vol 1–5. Port Royal, PA: Gītā-nāgarī Press. 2003. ISBN 978-0-911233-22-3.
- Reading Reform. Washington, D.C.: Gītā-Nāgārī Press. 1985. ISBN 978-0-911233-28-5.
- Under the banyan tree. Potomac, MD: Gītā-nāgarī Press. October 1986. p. 32 pages. ISBN 978-0-911233-35-3.
- Entering the Life of Prayer. USA?: GNP. 1987. ISBN 978-0-911233-97-1.
- Ista-gosthi vols. 1–3. 1988–1990.
- Prabhupada Meditations Vol 1–4. 1991.
- Begging for the Nectar of the Holy Name. Port Royal, Pa.: GN Press. December 1992. p. 340 pages. ISBN 978-0-911233-98-8.
- Living with the Scriptures. Philadelphia: Gītā-nāgarī Press. November 1990. ISBN 978-0-911233-26-1.
- Memories. Port Royal, PA: GN Press. 1997. ISBN 978-0-911233-69-8.
- Shack Notes: Moments While at a Writing Retreat. Port Royal, Pa.: GN Press. 1995. ISBN 978-0-911233-91-9.
- A Poor Man Reads the Bhagavatam. Vols. 1995–2008.
- Japa Walks, Japa Talks. Port Royal, PA: GN Press, Inc. 1995. p. 106 pages. ISBN 978-0-911233-58-2.
- One Hundred Prabhupada Poems. Port Royal, PA: GN Press. April 1995. p. 173 pages. ISBN 978-0-911233-59-9.
- Radio Shows. Port Royal, PA: GN Press. June 1995. p. 314 pages. ISBN 978-0-911233-60-5.
- Niti-Sastras: Sayings of Canakya and Hitopadesa As Quoted by Srila Prabhupada. Port Royal, Pa.: GN Press. July 1995. p. 4 pages. ISBN 978-0-911233-61-2.
- Churning the Milk Ocean. Port Royal, PA: GN Press. November 1995. p. 606 pages. ISBN 978-0-911233-63-6.
- The Daily News: All Things Fail Without Krsna. Port Royal, PA: GN Press. 1995. p. 97 pages. ISBN 978-0-911233-55-1.
- My Relationship With Lord Krishna. Port Royal, PA: GN Press, Inc. June 1995. p. 99 pages. ISBN 978-0-911233-57-5.
- Dear Sky: Letters from a Sannyasi. Port Royal, PA: GM Press. 1996. ISBN 978-0-911233-99-5.
- Gosvāmī, Satsvarūpa Dāsa (June 1996). From Copper to Touchstone: Favorite Selections from the Caitanya-Caritamrta. Satsvarupa dasa Goswami. ISBN 978-0-911233-66-7.
- Photo Preaching. Port Royal, PA: GN Press. June 1996. p. 101 pages. ISBN 978-0-911233-65-0.
- Gentle power: Collected poems, 1995–1996. Port Royal, PA: GN Press. 1996. p. 119 pages. ISBN 978-0-911233-67-4.
- The Wild Garden: Writings from 1990–1993. Port Royal, PA: GN Press. 1996. p. 355 pages. ISBN 978-0-911233-54-4.
- Gosvāmī, Satsvarūpa Dāsa (1998). The Qualities of Sri Krsna. Satsvarupa dasa Goswami. p. 152 pages. ISBN 978-0-911233-64-3.
- My Letters from Srila Prabhupada vols 1–3. Port Royal, PA: GN Press. 1986. ISBN 978-0-911233-84-1.
- Cc Asraya: A Diary While Attempting to Read Sri Caitanya-Caritamrta. Port Royal, PA: GN Press. November 1997. p. 200 pages. ISBN 978-0-911233-34-6.
- Every Day, Just Write vols. 1–19. 1997–2003.
- Passing Places, Eternal Truths. Port Royal, PA: GN Press. January 1998. ISBN 978-0-911233-31-5.
- The Waves at Jagannatha Puri and Other Poems. Washington, D.C.: Gita-nagari Press. June 1998. p. 130 pages. ISBN 978-0-911233-30-8.
- From Matter to Spirit: Paintings, Poems, and Improvisations. La Crosse, FL: GN Press. November 1999. ISBN 978-0-911233-39-1.
- From Imperfection, Purity Will Come About. Port Royal, PA: GN Press. May 1999. ISBN 978-0-911233-52-0.
- Vaisnava Compassion. La Crosse, FL: GN Press. June 2001. p. 170 pages. ISBN 978-0-911233-25-4.
- Stowies. La Crosse, Fl: GN Press. September 2002. p. 93 pages. ISBN 978-0-911233-04-9.
- Gosvāmī, Satsvarūpa Dāsa (October 2006). Write and Die. Satsvarupa dasa Goswami. ISBN 978-0-911233-85-8. The ISBN printed in the book (0-911233-85-7198) is invalid; it does not conform to ISBN standards.
- Visitors. Port Royal, PA.: GN Press. January 2007. p. 185. ISBN 978-0-911233-50-6.
- Gosvāmī, Satsvarūpa Dāsa (November 2008). Human at Best. Satsvarupa dasa Goswami. p. 386. ISBN 978-0-911233-95-7.

== See also ==
- Gaudiya Vaishnavism
- Bhaktivedanta Book Trust
- List of Hindu gurus and sants
- Shaunaka Rishi Das, Director of Oxford Centre for Hindu Studies
- Yadunandana Swami, Principal of Bhaktivedanta College, a disciple
