= Ravindra Svarupa Dasa =

American Hare Krishna leader

Ravindra Svarupa Dasa (IAST: Ravindra-svarūpa Dāsa; born William H. Deadwyler, III) is a religious studies scholar and a Hare Krishna religious leader. He was initiated by A. C. Bhaktivedanta Swami Prabhupada in 1971. He has been a member of ISKCON's Governing Body Commission since 1987, Chairman of that Commission's North American GBC Continental Committee, is the president of ISKCON of Philadelphia, and an ISKCON Guru. He holds an M.A. and Ph.D. in Religion from Temple University and a B.A. in philosophy from the University of Pennsylvania. He has written extensively on Vaishnava philosophy and used his education to further the discourse of Gaudiya Vaishnava Theology within the context of ISKCON. He is the author of Encounter with the Lord of the Universe: Collected Essays 1978-1983 (Washington, DC: Gita Nagari Press, 1984). He also is featured on Shelter's Attaining the Supreme, where he gives a lecture on a hidden track.

== Publications ==
- William H. Deadwyler Necessity and the Cosmic Organism: An Examination of Hartshorne's God — Philadelphia: Temple University, 1980. — 526 p.
- Ravīndra-svarūpa Dāsa Encounter With the Lord of the Universe: Collected Essays, 1978-1983 — Washington, DC: Gita-nagari Press, 1983. — viii, 118 p. — ISBN 0-911233-20-2.
- Ravīndra Svarūpa Dāsa The Scholarly Tradition in Caitanyite Vaisnavism: India and America // ISKCON Review. — 1985. — Vol. 1. — No. 1. — ISSN 0886-6910.
- William H. Deadwyler The Contribution of Bhagavata-Dharma Toward a 'Scientific Religion' and a 'Religious Science' // T. D. Singh, R. Gomatam Synthesis of Science and Religion — Critical Essays and Dialogues. — San Francisco: Bhaktivedanta Institute, 1987. — pp. 366-380. — ISBN 0-941525-01-5.
- William H. Deadwyler Patterns in ISKCON's Historical Self-Perception // David G. Bromley, Larry D. Shinn Krishna Consciousness in the West. — Lewisburg: Bucknell University Press, 1989. — pp. 55-75. — ISBN 0-8387-5144-X.
- William H. Deadwyler The Religions of Others in ISKCON's Eyes // Leonard Swidler, Paul Mojzes Attitudes of Religions and Ideologies Toward the Outsider: The Other. — Lewiston: Edwin Mellen Press, 1990. — ISBN 0-88946-270-4.
- William H. Deadwyler Saṁpradāya of Śrī Caitanya // Steven J. Rosen Vaiṣṇavism: Contemporary Scholars Discuss the Gauḍīya Tradition. — New York: Folk Books, 1992. — pp. 127-140. — ISBN 0-9619763-6-5.
- Ravīndra Svarūpa Dāsa Religion And Religions // ISKCON Communications Journal. — 1993. — Vol. 1. — No. 1. — ISSN 1358-3867.
- Ravīndra Svarūpa Dāsa Modern Historical Consciousness: Its Cause and Cure. Part I: The Great Chain // ISKCON Communications Journal. — 1994. — Vol. 1. — No. 2. — ISSN 1358-3867.
- Ravīndra Svarūpa Dāsa Modern Historical Consciousness: Its Causes and Cure. Part II: The Breaking of the Chain // ISKCON Communications Journal. — 1995. — Vol. 3. — No. 1. — ISSN 1358-3867.
- Ravīndra Svarūpa Dāsa A response to Daniel Acharuparambil, Hinduism in interreligious Dialogue, ICJ Vol. 4, No. 1 // ISKCON Communications Journal. — 1996. — Vol. 4. — No. 2. — ISSN 1358-3867.
- William H. Deadwyler The Devotee and the Deity: Living a Personalistic Theology // J. P. Waghorne, N. Cutler Gods of Flesh, Gods of Stone: The Embodiment of Divinity in India. — New York: Columbia University Press, 1996. — pp. 69-87. — ISBN 0-231-10777-3.
- Ravīndra Svarūpa Dāsa ISKCON and Varṇāśrama-Dharma: A Mission Unfulfilled // ISKCON Communications Journal. — 1999. — Vol. 7. — No. 1. — pp. 35-44. — ISSN 1358-3867.
- Ravīndra Svarūpa Dāsa Pillars of Success: The Principles and Practices of Reform in ISKCON // ISKCON Communications Journal. — 1999. — Vol. 7. — No. 2. — ISSN 1358-3867.
- Ravīndra Svarūpa Dāsa Restoring the Authority of the GBC // ISKCON Communications Journal. — 2000. — Vol. 8. — No. 1. — ISSN 1358-3867.
- Ravīndra Svarūpa Dāsa Rādhā, Kṛṣṇa, Caitanya: The Inner Dialectic of the Divine Relativity // The Journal of Vaiṣṇava Studies. — Folk Books, 2001. — Т. 10. — № 1. — pp. 5-26.
- William H. Deadwyler Cleaning House and Cleaning Hearts: Reform and Renewal in ISKCON // Edwin F. Bryant, Maria L. Ekstrand The Hare Krishna Movement: The Postcharismatic Fate of a Religious Transplant. — New York: Columbia University Press, 2004. — pp. 149-169. — ISBN 0-231-12256-X.
- William H. Deadwyler Bringing the Lord's Song to a Strange Land: Srila Prabhupada's Strategy of "Cultural Conquest" and Its Prospects // Graham Dwyer, Richard J. Cole The Hare Krishna Movement: Forty Years of Chant and Change. — London: I.B. Tauris, 2007. — pp. 103–120. — ISBN 1-84511-407-8.
