= Ferdinando Sardella =

Swedish religious scholar (born 1960)

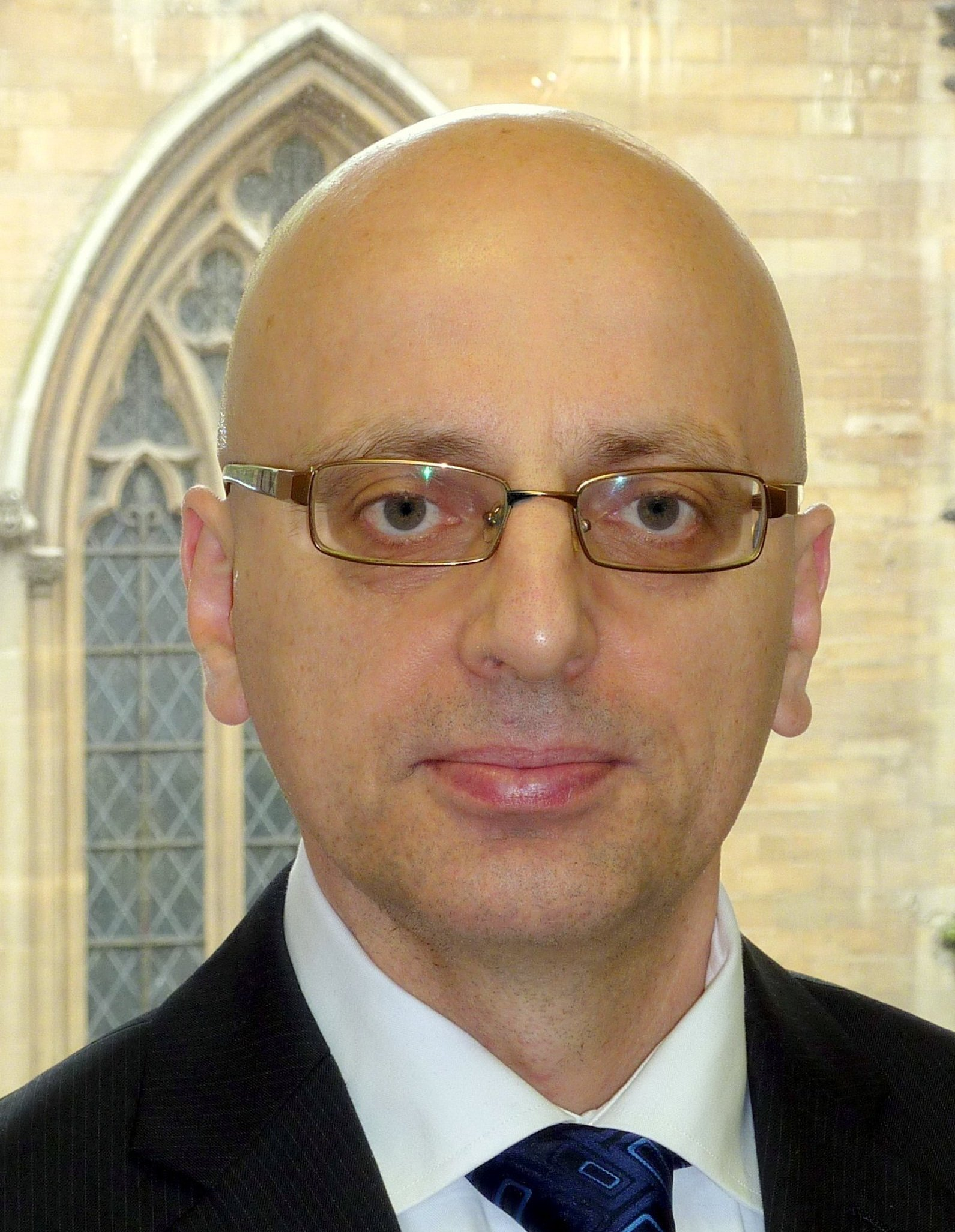
- Ferdinando Sardella, 2013
- Born: 1960 (age 65–66)
- Awards: Donner Institute award

Academic background
- Education: University of Gothenburg

Academic work
- Main interests: history of religion, religious studies, Hinduism

Ferdinando Sardella, born July 16, 1960, in Vicenza, Italy, is an Italian scholar of the history of religions, Hinduism, and religious studies, the former director and coordinator of the Forum for South Asia Studies at Uppsala University.

== Academic background ==
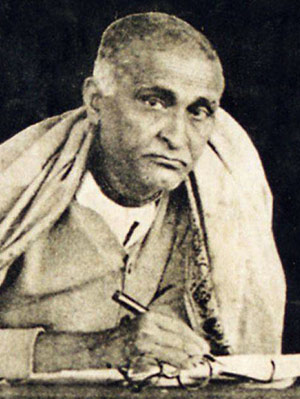
Bhaktisiddhanta Sarasvati (1874–1937), the subject of Sardella's monograph.

Sardella studied at the University of Gothenburg, and graduated with BA and B.Th. degrees. Following his MA in theology with the history of religions as his major subject, Sardella obtained a PhD degree in 2010 at his alma mater on Bhaktisiddhanta Sarasvati, a prominent Bengali proponent of the bhakti tradition of Gaudiya Vaishnavism in the 20th century and founder of a movement called the Gaudiya Math.

Exploring the Gaudiya Vaishnava bhakti school along with its philosophy and practice as taught by Bhaktisiddhanta, Sardella showed it to be a personalistic current that challenged the predominantly monistic perception of Hinduism in the West. Hitherto relatively unknown, this strand of Chaitanya bhakti later on gained global spread in the form of the International Society for Krishna Consciousness, or the Hare Krishna movement, inspired by Bhaktisiddhanta's teachings. In 2010 the Donner Institute, attached to Abo Akademi University, gave Sardella's dissertation their first newly established award for "outstanding research into religion". In 2013 the dissertation was published by Oxford University Press as a monograph that Gavin Flood in his review called "a significant contribution to scholarship not only of the modern Gaudiya Vaishnava movement but also of the religious history of Bengal within the last half of the colonial period".

Sardella currently serves as a postdoctorate researcher in the History of religions at the Department of Theology, and until February 1, 2014 was the director and coordinator of the Forum for South Asia Studies for the Humanities and Social Sciences at Uppsala University. He is a research fellow at the Oxford Centre for Hindu Studies in Great Britain, heading the Bengali Vaishnavism in the Modern Period research project. Sardella also serves as a senior lecturer on the History of Religions at the University of Gothenburg. He is an external expert for the Centre for the Study of Religion and Society at the Department of Sociology, Jadavpur University in Kolkata, in collaboration with Ruby Sain.

Sardella is a deputy member representing Sweden in the Nordic Centre in India, an association of leading universities and research institutions of Denmark, Finland, Iceland, Norway, and Sweden established in 2001 for facilitating cooperation in research and higher education between the Nordic countries and India.

== Areas of research ==
Sardella's areas of interest and specialization are: modern Hinduism, Buddhism, religions in South Asia (from both a local and a global perspective), new religious movements, religion and science, medieval bhakti movements, Bengali and Sanskrit studies, the history and sociology of religion, interreligious dialogue, comparative religion, globalization and postcolonial theory. His current research plans include projects that explore the globalization of Vaishnavism, covering the postcolonial period up to the turn of the 21st century.

== Publications ==
Sardella has authored a number of academic books, papers and chapters.

Books:

- Modern Hindu personalism: The History, Life, and Thought of Bhaktisiddhanta Sarasvati; Oxford University Press. (2013)
- The Sociology of Religion in India: Past, Present, and Future; Abhijeet Publications. (2013)
- Bhaktisiddhanta Sarasvati: the Context and Significance of a Modern Hindu Personalist. Diss. (2010)

Chapters:

- Text migration: The translation and modern reception of the Bhāgavata Purāna.The Bhagavata Purana by Ravi M. Gupta and Kenneth R.Valpey; Columbia University Press. (2013)
- Bhaktisiddhanta Saraswati. Brill's Encyclopedia of Hinduism. Knut A. Jacobsen (Editor-in-Chief), University of Bergen; Brill Publishers. (2013)
- Sweden. Brill's Encyclopedia of Hinduism. Knut A. Jacobsen (Editor-in-Chief), University of Bergen; Brill Publishers. (2013)
- Religious experiments in colonial Calcutta: Modern Hinduism and bhakti among the Indian middle class. Religion and the body, Tore Ahlbäck, Björn Dahla (red.), Åbo: Donner Institute for Research in Religious and Cultural History. (2011)
- Hinduism i Sverige (Swedish: Hinduism in Sweden). Religion i Sverige, Ingvar Svanberg and David Westerlund (red.). Stockholm, Sweden. (2008)
- Krishnarörelsen (Swedish: The Krishna movement). Religion i Sverige, Ingvar Svanberg and David Westerlund (red.). Stockholm, Sweden. (2008)
- Krishnaskolan, mellan öst och väst (Swedish: The Krishna School, between East and West) (2007)

Papers:

- Bhaktisiddhanta Sarasvati: A personalist view of nature. Journal of Vaishnava Studies. (2010)
- Shifts in Burmese Buddhism: The practice lineage of S. N. Goenka. Journal of Sociology, Kolkata, India. (2010)
- Bhaktisiddhanta Sarasvati (1874–1937). Journal of Vaishnava Studies. (2008)
- Neither man nor God: Perspectives on the guru in the Hare Krishna movement in Sweden. FINYAR, Umeå: Föreningen forskning och information om nya religiösa rörelser. (2005)
- Prinsessa och asket. Samtida tolkningar av Mirabai (Swedish: Princess and ascetic. Contemporary interpretations of Mirabai). Cakra: Journal for Indian Religions, Lund: Centrum för teologi och religionsvetenskap. (2004)

Book reviews:

- Hindu Widow Marriage, by Ishvarchandra Vidyasagar and Brian A. Hatcher (translator)

General articles:

- Upplysning i ett indiskt interneringsläger-Walter Eidlitz: en konvertits andliga sökande (Swedish: Enlightenment in an internment camp: Walther Eidlitz, a Convert's Spiritual Search)
- Kolkata, stad i förändring (Swedish: Kolkata: A changing city) (2005)

== See also ==
- Oxford Centre for Hindu Studies
