= Yadunandana Swami =

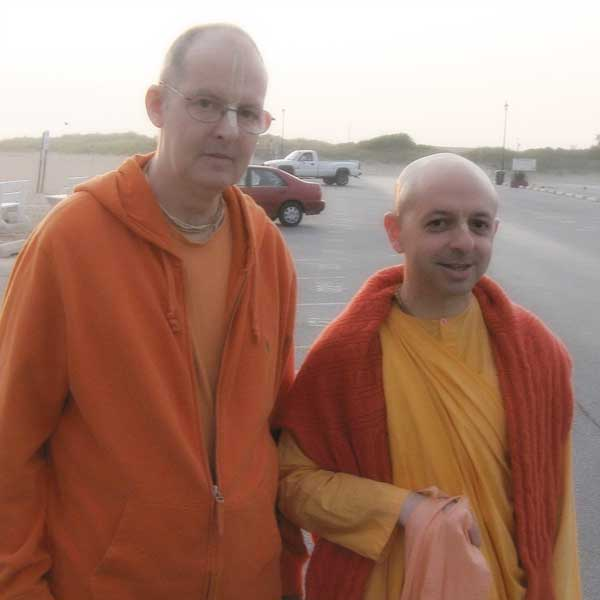
- Yadunandana Swami (right), 2009

Personal life
- Born: Spain
- Other name: Javier Pera López
- Website: http://www.yswami.com

Religious life
- Religion: Hinduism
- Initiation: Diksa–1978, Sannyasa–2009

Religious career
- Post: Principal Bhaktivedanta College, Sannyasi, Executive Member of Ministry of Educational Development of Governing Body Commission

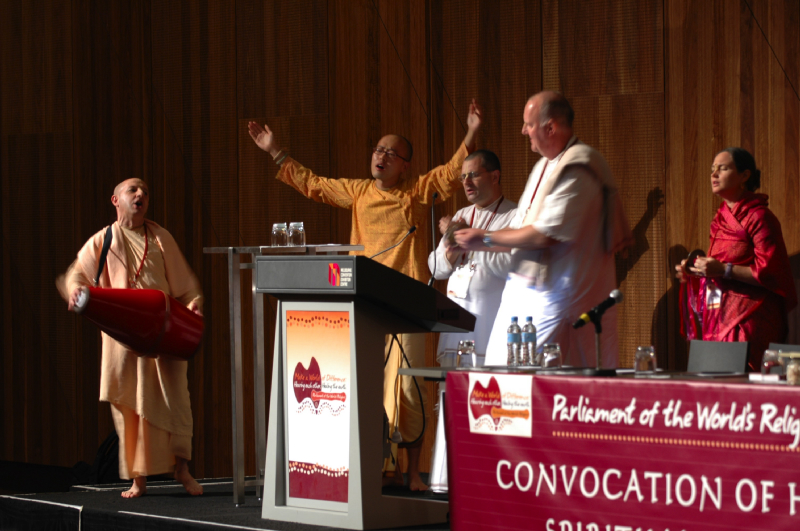
Yadunandana Swami leading the kirtana during 2009 Parliament of World's Religions in Melbourne.

Yadunandana Swami, Principal of Bhaktivedanta College, is the first Spanish second generation sannyasi of ISKCON. He was approved by ISKCON's GBC body, in February 2009, as an ISKCON sannyasa. He is one of the original developers of VTE (Vaisnava Training and Education) courses and is currently an Executive Member of Governing Body Commission Ministry of Educational Development.

Yadunandana Swami, a disciple of Satsvarupa dasa Goswami, is originally from Spain. Among other subjects, he teaches Bhaktivaibhava courses at Bhaktivedanta College and is specializing on History of sannyasa in ISKCON. On 10 March 2009 Yadunandana received sannyasa within the presence of current ISKCON sannyasa minister Prahladananda Swami, ceremony was introduced by his godbrother Hridaya Caitanya Dasa, Kadamba Kanana Swami performed the fire sacrifice and Jayadvaita Swami officially awarded danda staff. He has been described as one "of the best scholars in the field of ISKCON Studies" and has represented ISKCON, along with other senior swami of ISKCON, Indradyumna Swami, in the parliament (Maha Satsang) of World Religions. He was the first ISKCON speaker on Krishna Consciousness and the Environment in 2009 Parliament of World's Religions and 2011 World Yoga Masters Summit for Proclamation of the World Yoga Day.
