= Jessica Frazier =

American academic

Jessica Frazier is an American lecturer in theology and religion at Trinity College, Oxford, and a fellow of the Oxford Centre for Hindu studies. Her work explores key philosophical themes across cultures, from Indian concepts of being to 20th century phenomenology. She is particularly interested in questions about ontology, value, selfhood and human flourishing. Frazier is the founding editor of the Journal of Hindu Studies and a frequent contributor to BBC radio.

== Selected publications ==
- Frazier, Jessica (2024-08-14), "What Kind of 'God' do Hindu Arguments for the Divine Show? Five Novel Divine Attributes of Brahman", Sophia, Bloomsbury, ISBN 9781474251556
- Frazier, Jessica (2024-08-23), "Against Infinite Nothingness: Ultimate Ground vs Metaphysical Nihilism in Indian Philosophy", Neue Zeitschrift für Systematische Theologie und Religionsphilosophie, Dialogues in South Asian Traditions: Religion, Philosophy, Literature and History., vol. 66, Ashgate, ISBN 1409474550
- Frazier, Jessica (2009), Reality, religion, and passion : Indian and Western approaches in Hans-Georg Gadamer and Rupa Gosvami, Studies in comparative philosophy and religion., Lexington Books, ISBN 0739132199
