= Bhakti Tirtha Swami =

American Hindu writer (1950–2005)

Bhakti Tirtha Swami Krishnapada
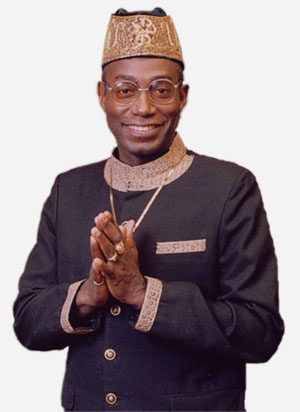

Personal life
- Born: February 25, 1950
- Died: June 27, 2005 (aged 55)
- Other names: John E. Favors, Toshombe Abdul, Ghanasyama Dasa (pre-sannyasa), Swami Krishnapada
- Website: Official Site

Religious life
- Religion: Hinduism
- Order: Sannyasa
- Philosophy: Achintya Bheda Abheda; Bhakti yoga
- Sect: Gaudiya Vaishnavism

Religious career
- Post: ISKCON Guru, Sannyasi
- Predecessor: A.C. Bhaktivedanta Swami Prabhupada

Bhakti Tirtha Swami (IAST: Bhakti-tīrtha Svāmī; February 25, 1950 – June 27, 2005), previously called John Favors and Toshombe Abdul and also known by the honorific Krishnapada (Kṛṣṇapāda), was a guru and governing body commissioner of the International Society for Krishna Consciousness (commonly known as the Hare Krishnas or ISKCON). He was the highest-ranking African American in ISKCON.

He wrote 17 books on religious topics and led community development projects in the United States and other countries. He was the founder and director of the Institute for Applied Spiritual Technology in Washington, DC, "a nonprofit, nondenominational organization whose membership represents a variety of spiritual paths and professional backgrounds". He traveled frequently and served as a spiritual consultant. He also served as chairman of the Third World Coalition. On February 7, 2006, the Council of the District of Columbia recognized him for dedication to social change for residents in the District of Columbia.

== Early life ==
Bhakti Tirtha Swami was born John Edwin Favors on February 25, 1950, into a Christian family living in Cleveland, Ohio, US. His parents instilled in him the values of self-confidence, religiosity and a spirit of generosity demonstrated by giving to persons less fortunate than oneself. As a child, John Favors appeared on television to preach Christianity.

== Education ==
Favors excelled in his academic achievements while attending East Technical High School in Cleveland and received a scholarship to attend the prestigious Hawken School, where he spent an additional year of college preparation in philosophy and political science. While at Hawken, he was a member of the football and wrestling teams.

In 1968 he came to Princeton University. While at Princeton, he partook as a leader in Martin Luther King Jr.'s civil rights movement being "at the forefront of political activism on campus, a leader of the Association of Black Collegians (ABC) and a founder of the Third World Center". He also served as a president of the student council. In 1972, he earned a B.A. in psychology and African American studies. Attending lectures at the university and reading books on different subjects, "he began feeling the futility of acquiring knowledge which would become obsolete very soon".

== International Society for Krishna Consciousness ==
After Princeton, he joined the Hare Krishna Movement and "began a career of worldwide travel, study, teaching, lecturing, and writing". On February 16, 1973, in Los Angeles he was initiated into the Gaudiya Vaishnava tradition by ISKCON's founder A. C. Bhaktivedanta Swami Prabhupada, whereupon he was given the name Ghanashyam Dasa (meaning servant of Krishna). In the 1970s, Ghanashyam Dasa preached Gaudiya Vaishnavism in Eastern Europe by distributing religious books and working with scholars.

On March 13, 1979, during Gaura-purnima festival at New Vrindaban, he was initiated into the Vaishnava sannyasa order of renunciation by Kirtanananda Swami and given the name Bhakti Tirtha Swami. In the same year, he visited Nigeria and to assist Brahmananda Swami in preaching in West Africa. In 1990, he was crowned as high chief in Warri, Nigeria. Later he went on to become a senior leader and one of the most prominent preachers within ISKCON and a member of its management body known as the Governing Body Commission.

He was the first person of African descent to become an initiating guru in the disciplic succession of the ancient Brahma-Madhva-Gaudiya Sampradaya. As a religious leader, Bhakti-tirtha Swami made a friendship with celebrities and served as a spiritual consultant, specializing in international relations and conflict resolution to high-ranking members of the United Nations and world leaders, including former President of South Africa Nelson Mandela and Zambia's president Kenneth Kaunda

Nori Muster (Ex-member of ISKCON) whom worked for ten years as a public relations secretary and editor of ISKCON's newspaper, the ISKCON World Review, recalls in her book:

By design, the ISKCON World Review was limited to pro-ISKCON good news from GBC zones around the world. We also printed profiles and covered activities of preachers in the movement. One of our favorites was Bhakti-tirtha, a Princeton graduate who once called himself Toshombe Abdul, president of his university's Association of Black Collegians. Bhakti-tirtha had a way of striking up a spontaneous friendship with celebrieties such as Muhammad Ali. In one issue we reported Bhakti-tirtha's visit to the Zambian statehouse, where he had dinner with the country's president, Dr. Kenneth Kaunda. He met the president through a judge, Aiyadurai Sivanandan, who had become a devotee. We also printed a photo of Justice Sivanandan, dressed in his black judge's robes and powdered wig, with tilak on his forehead. The judge resigned his post in Zambia to serve ISKCON temple in India. One of ISKCON predecessors had predicted that in the dawning of Lord Chaitanya's golden age judges would wear tilak and become devotees.

In 1990, Bhakti Tirtha Swami was crowned High Chief in Warri, Nigeria, West Africa in recognition of the reputable work he performed there.

== Works ==
Swami published more than 17 books and was frequently interviewed in the media.

=== Bibliography ===
Bhakti Tirtha Swami wrote more than 17 books, among them can be named the following:

- Leadership for an Age of Higher Consciousness I: Administration from a Metaphysical Perspective. — 1st ed. — Largo, MD: Hari-Nama Press, 1996. — 324 p. — ISBN 1-885414-02-1
- Leadership for an Age of Higher Consciousness II: Ancient Wisdom for Modern Times. — Largo, MD: Hari-Nama Press, 2002. — 162 p. — ISBN 1-885414-11-0
- Reflections on Sacred Teachings Volume I: Sri Siksastaka. — Washington, D.C.: Hari-Nama Press, 2002. — 247 p. — ISBN 1-885414-13-7
- Reflections on Sacred Teachings Volume II: Madhurya-Kadambini. — Washington, D.C.: Hari-Nama Press, 2003. — 196 p. — ISBN 1-885414-14-5
- Reflections on Sacred Teachings Volume III: Harinama Cintamani. — Washington, D.C.: Hari-Nama Press, 2004. — 283 p. — ISBN 1-885414-15-3
- Reflections on Sacred Teachings Volume IV: Sri Isopanisad. — Washington, D.C.: Hari-Nama Press, 2005. — 320 p. — ISBN 1-885414-19-6
- Reflections on Sacred Teachings Volume V: Srila Bhaktisiddhanta's Sixty-four Principles for Community. — Washington, D.C.: Hari-Nama Press, 2007. — 235 p. — ISBN 1-885414-21-8
- Reflections on Sacred Teachings Volume VI: Radha-Sunya: Missing Mercy. — Washington, D.C.: Hari-Nama Press. — 147 p.
- Spiritual Warrior I: Uncovering Spiritual Truths in Psychic Phenomena. — Largo, MD: Hari-Nama Press, 1996. — 201 p. — ISBN 1-885414-01-3
- Spiritual Warrior II: Transforming Lust into Love. — Largo, MD: Hari-Nama Press, 1998. — 238 p. — ISBN 1-885414-03-X
- Spiritual Warrior III: Solace for the Heart in Difficult Times. — Largo, MD: Hari-Nama Press, 2000. — 296 p. — ISBN 1-885414-06-4
- Spiritual Warrior IV: Conquering the Enemies of the Mind. — 1st ed. — Washington, DC: Hari-Nama Press, 2004. — 285 p. — ISBN 1-885414-16-1
- Spiritual Warrior V: Making the Mind Your Best Friend. — Largo, MD: Hari-Nama Press, 2003. — 275 p. — ISBN 1-885414-17-X
- Spiritual Warrior VI: Beyond Fanaticism, Terrorism, and War: Discover the Peace Solution. — Largo, MD: Hari-Nama Press, 2006. — 306 p. — ISBN 1-885414-18-8
- The Beggar I: Meditations and Prayers on the Supreme Lord. — 1st ed. — Washington, D.C.: Hari-Nama Press, 1994. — 160 p. — ISBN 1-885414-00-5
- The Beggar II: Crying Out for the Mercy. — Washington, D.C.: Hari-Nama Press, 1998. — 162 p. — ISBN 1-885414-04-8
- The Beggar III: False Ego: The Greatest Enemy of the Spiritual Leader. — Washington, D.C.: Hari-Nama Press, 2002. — 194 p. — ISBN 1-885414-10-2
- The Beggar IV, Die Before Dying. — Washington, D.C.: Hari-Nama Press, 2005. — 155 p. — ISBN 1-885414-22-6

=== Films ===
Bhakti Tirtha Swami took part in many documentaries, television shows and was frequently interviewed in the media. B.T. Swami Vault was created to preserve his filmed memory B. T. Swami was interviewed in One: The Movie

== Death ==
Bhakti Tirtha Swami died following complications from melanoma cancer on June 27, 2005, 3:35pm at Gita Nagari, the Gaudiya Vaishnava Krishna community in central Pennsylvania. Bhakti Tirtha Swami is survived by four sisters, Bernadette Satterfield, Julia Henderson, Frances Myers, and Marguerite Brooks; a brother, Paul Favors; and numerous nieces and nephews.

== Honors ==
On February 7, 2006, the Council of the District of Columbia adopted ceremonial resolution, in which it "recognized His Holiness Bhakti Tirtha Swami Krishnapada for dedication to social change that has impacted civil and human rights for residents in the District of Columbia".

== In popular culture ==
=== Black Lotus biography ===
In 2007, his biography was released, entitled Black Lotus: The Spiritual Journey of an Urban Mystic, the 410-page book is complete with full-color pictures, interviews with loved ones, and comprehensive Index. The author, Steven J. Rosen is senior editor of the Journal of Vaishnava Studies and associate editor of Back to Godhead, the magazine of the Hare Krishna movement. According to Princeton University website, the book "explores the life and mission of His Holiness Bhakti Tirtha Swami (1950-2005), an African-American seeker who rose from impoverished conditions in the Cleveland ghetto to become a global spiritual leader of the Hare Krishna movement".
