= Hridayananda das Goswami =

American Hare Krishna leader

Hṛdayānanda Dāsa Gosvāmī Ācāryadeva
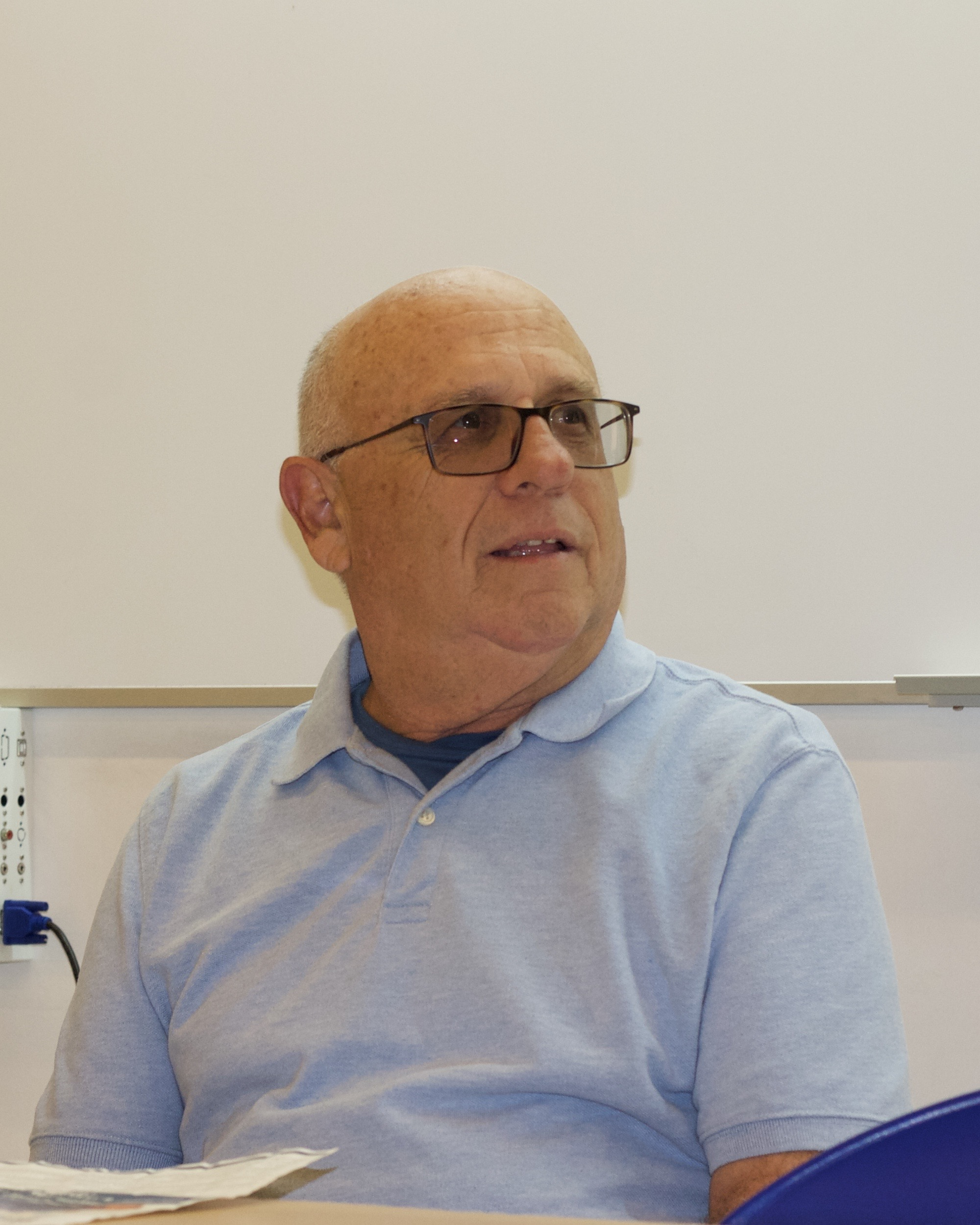

Guru
- In office July 9, 1977–present

Founder of Krishna West
- In office 2013–present

Member of ISKCON Governing Body Commission
- In office 1972–present

Personal life
- Born: Howard J. Resnick; November 5, 1948 (age 77) Los Angeles, California, US

Religious life
- Religion: Vaishnavism
- Lineage: Brahma-Madhva-Gauḍīya Sampradāya
- Sect: Gauḍīya Vaiṣṇavavāda
- Monastic name: Hṛdayānanda Dāsa Gosvāmī
- Initiation: Gauḍīya Vaiṣṇava Dikṣa

Senior posting
- Predecessor: Prabhupada
- Website: www.hdgoswami.com

Hridayananda das(a) Goswami (IAST: Hṛdayānanda Dāsa Gosvāmī; title: Acaryadeva IAST: Ācāryadeva; birth name: Howard J. Resnick; date of birth: November 5, 1948, Los Angeles, California) is an American Vaishnava leader and preacher, one of the leading spiritual leaders of the International Society for Krishna Consciousness (ISKCON) and one of the most distinguished disciples and close friend of ISKCON founder Bhaktivedanta Swami Prabhupada, who appointed him as preacher. H.D. Goswami is a guru and member of the ISKCON Governing Body Commission since 1974.

== Early life and education ==
Howard Resnick was born on November 5, 1948, in Los Angeles, California. His maternal grandmother was from Vilnius, Lithuania.

He entered the University of California at Berkeley in 1967. In 1992, H.D. Goswami earned a bachelor's degree in religious studies from the University of California, Los Angeles. He completed his doctorate in Sanskrit and Indology from Harvard University in 1996.

== Career ==
=== Conversion to Vaishnavism ===
Resnick was first introduced to Gaudiya Vaishnavism in 1969 when he attended a lecture by ISKCON founder Bhaktivedanta Swami Prabhupada. Thereupon, he left his education and settled in the Hare Krishna ashram in Berkeley and joined the formation. He received initiation from Prabhupada on February 8, 1970, and given his Sanskrit name "Hridayananda Dasa". He became a sannyasi in 1972 and received the title "Goswami".

=== Preaching in Latin America ===
In 1974, Prabhupada appointed H.D. Goswami to the ISKCON GBC. He was subsequently appointed to the ministry in charge of preaching in Latin America and Florida. Under H.D. Goswami's leadership, ISKCON in Brazil and other Latin American countries experienced a period of rapid growth, with Vaishnava temples opening in many major cities. He became a guru in July 1977.

=== Writing and translation activities ===
In the early 1980s, H.D. Goswami completed the Sanskrit translation and commentary of the Hindu scripture Srimad Bhagavadam, initiated by Prabhupada. He later adapted the ancient Indian epic Mahabharata into a historical novel. His book "A Comprehensive Guide to Bhagavad-Gita With Literal Translation" was published in 2015.

=== Academic activities ===
H.D. Goswami has taught as an adjunct professor at the University of California at Los Angeles, the University of Florida, and the Graduate Theological Union at Berkeley. He has published many works on Vaishnava philosophy.

== Works ==
=== English books ===
- Hridayananda Dasa Goswami (1984). Enlightenment by the Natural Path. Los Angeles: Bhaktivedanta Book Trust.
- Hridayananda Dasa Goswami (1984). The Glories of Śrī Caitanya Mahāprabhu: a compendium of Vaiṣṇava texts. New York: Bala Books. ISBN 0-89647-018-0.
- Hridayananda Dasa Goswami (1996). Our Original Position: Śrīla Prabhupāda and the Vaiṣṇava Siddhānta. ISKCON GBC Press.
- Hridayananda Dasa Goswami (2015). A Comprehensive Guide to Bhagavad-gita. Krishna West Press. ISBN 978-0-9862403-0-0.

=== Articles and chapters in books ===
- Hṛdayānanda Dāsa Gosvāmī. Isolation in Krishna Consciousness // ISKCON Communications Journal. — 1994. — Vol. 2, No 2. — ISSN 1358-3867.
- Hṛdayānanda Dāsa Gosvāmī. State and Society in Ancient India // ISKCON Communications Journal. — 1995. — Vol. 3, No 1. — ISSN 1358-3867.
- Howard J. Resnick. Kṛṣṇa in the Bhagavad-gītā: A Beginning Ontology from the Gauḍīya Perspective // The Journal of Vaishnava Studies. — 1995. — Vol. 3, No 2. — С. 5—32. Archived from the original on 4 March 2016.
- Howard J. Resnick. The Supremacy of Viṣṇu/Kṛṣṇa in the Mahābhārata // The Journal of Vaishnava Studies. — 1996. — Vol. 4, No 3. — С. 5—21.
- Howard J. Resnick. Translation of Śrīmad Bhāgavatam in the Gauḍīya Vaiṣṇava Sampradāya // Enrica Garzilli Translating, Translations, Translators: From India to the West (Harvard Oriental Series Opera Minora, Volume 1). — Harvard University, 1996. — ISBN 1-888789-02-6.
- Hṛdayānanda Dāsa Gosvāmī. For Whom Does Hinduism Speak? // ISKCON Communications Journal. — 1999. — Vol. 7, No 1. — ISSN 1358-3867.
- Hṛdayānanda Dāsa Gosvāmī. The Role of the Guru in a Multi-Guru Society // ISKCON Communications Journal. — 2000. — Vol. 8, No 1. — С. 45–53. — ISSN 1358-3867.
- Howard J. Resnick. Foreword // A. N. Chatterjee Sri Chaitanya and the Chaitanya movement. — New Delhi: Associate Publishing Company, 2001. — ISBN 81-85211-51-5.
- Howard Resnick. Heresy and the Jiva Debate // The Hare Krishna Movement: The Post-Charismatic Fate of a Religious Transplant / Edwin Bryant and Maria Ekstrand. — New York: Columbia University Press, 2004. — С. 264–270. — ISBN 0-231-12256-X.

=== Portuguese books ===
- Hridayananda Dasa Goswami. O livro de soluções: apresentando uma conferencia proferida na Universidade do Chile e uma conversa com Sua Excelencia o Arcebispo Dom Hélder Câmara. — São Paulo: Bhaktivedanta Book Trust, 1981. — xii, 76 p.
- Hridayananda Dasa Goswami. Soluções 2: apresentando uma entrevista com a Manchete e um ensaio sobre o aborto. — 2a impr. — São Paulo: Bhaktivedanta Book Trust, 1982. — 50 p.
- Hridayananda Dasa Goswami. Soluções 3: Apresentando uma palestra na Faculdade de Filosofia da UFMG, uma conversa com o ex-Ministro da Educacao do Peru e um ensaio sobre conceitos nacionais / Textos traduzidos por, Visvavandya Das (Antonio Jose de Freitas), Hadai Pandita Das (Roberto do Carmo Rocha). — São Paulo: Bhaktivedanta Book Trust, 1983. — xvii, 43 p. — ISBN 85-7015-025-3.
- Hridayananda Dasa Goswami. Iluminação pelo caminho natural / Tradução e adaptação: Mahakala dasa e Angira Muni dasa; ilustrações e capa: Puspavan dasa. — São Paulo: Bhaktivedanta Book Trust, 1982. — 56 p.
- Hridayananda Dasa Goswami. Os valores da liberdade: onde o ocidente encontra o oriente. — São Paulo: Bhaktivedanta Book Trust, 1984. — 52 p. — ISBN 85-7015-036-9.
- Hridayananda Dasa Goswami. Soluções para uma prosperidade objetiva. — São Paulo: Bhaktivedanta Book Trust, 1991. — x, 52 p. — ISBN 85-7015-066-0.
- Hridayananda Dasa Goswami. Memórias de Śrīla Ācāryadeva. — São Paulo: Instituto Bhaktivedanta de Filosofia, 1996. — vi, 122 p. — 5000.

=== Spanish books ===
- Hridayananda Dasa Goswami (1983). Iluminacion Por El Camino Natural. Fondo Editorial Bhaktivedanta.
