= Oxford Centre for Hindu Studies =

Academic institution at Oxford

The Oxford Centre for Hindu Studies
- Established: 1997; 29 years ago
- Focus: The study of Hindu culture, religion, languages, literature, philosophy, history, arts and society, in all periods and in all parts of the world.
- Chair: The Lord Navnit Dholakia OBE PC DL
- Director: Shaunaka Rishi Das
- Key people: Prof Gavin Flood, Dr Nicholas Sutton, Dr Jessica Frazier, Dr Rembert Lutjerharms, Dr Bjarne Wernicke-Olesen, Anuradha Dooney
- Subsidiaries: The Bhumi Project, OCHS Continuing Education Department
- Address: 1 St Giles', OX1 3JS
- Location: Oxford, UK
- Website: www.ochs.org.uk

The Oxford Centre for Hindu Studies, founded in 1997 and based in Oxford, England, is a research academy focused on the study and teaching of Hindu cultures of India and Nepal. It develops academic programmes of education, research and publishing in Hindu studies. It aims to encourage the Hindu community in the academic study of their own traditions and cultures. From 2006 to 2020, it was granted the status of a "recognised independent centre" working with the University of Oxford.

== Naming ==
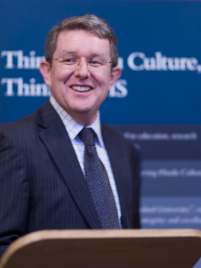
The centre's founding director, Shaunaka Rishi Das

When founded, the OCHS was for a short time known as the Oxford Centre for Vaishnava and Hindu Studies (OCVHS). The centre's lean towards Vaishnava traditions reflected the fact that its founding director, Shaunaka Rishi Das, is a Vaishnava priest. As the Centre grew, it became more inclusive and broader in scope regarding Hindu Studies, leading to its change of name. The Centre started out in a suburban house on Divinity Road with three students and a small library of donated books. It then moved into a larger location in Magdalen Street, Oxford, and currently resides in a temporary residence on 1 St Giles', Oxford. Preparations for a permanent location on Woodstock Road, Oxford, are underway.

== Educational programmes ==
Most students are members of Oxford colleges and are studying for degrees in the faculties of Theology and Religion, Asian and Middle Eastern Studies, or History and Anthropology. Since 1997, the centre has been inviting scholars to deliver lectures and tutorials at Oxford University. These include recipients of the Shivdasani and J.P. and Beena Khaitain Visiting Fellowships, with the Shivdasani Fellowship sponsoring Indian scholars and the J.P. and Beena Khaitan Fellowship helping scholars from other regions to come to Oxford. By these means the Centre encourages intellectual understanding between cultures of learning. The centre offers regular interdisciplinary lectures and seminars at Oxford including the named Majewski, Wahlstrom and Ford lectures.

One of the centre's longest-standing exchange programs is with Aarhus University, active nearly every term since October 2014. Bjarne Wernicke-Olesen, an OCHS Fellow, established the Memorandum of Understanding with the Aarhus University Department for the Study of Religion that enabled the exchange. Danish visiting students are hosted at the centre for one or more terms to further their Sanskrit studies. The centre has at times hosted large groups of visiting Aarhus students. In Spring 2016, on one such visit, a group of students came to the OCHS for a two-day seminar on the Haṭhayogapradīpikā.

=== Continuing Education Department ===
Since 2003, the OCHS Continuing Education Department (CED) has facilitated access to Hindu Studies for adults in the UK at various locations, and online for a more international audience.

The centre's online courses explore Hindu beliefs and practices along with notions of Hindu identity in the lives of modern practitioners. Courses are offered such as "Introduction to Sanskrit", "Hinduism and Sacred Sound: Chant and Music", and "Philosophy of Yoga". The centre develops and releases new courses in conjunction with scholars globally, with 12 courses currently offered and several more in development. The online program had 734 students enrolled in 2018.

Besides online courses, the centre offers day schools and summer schools. Day schools held in London have explored topics such as Bhakti and the Upanisads in a condensed format. The OCHS has also organized summer schools every year since 2014, with each spanning around three days.

=== Library ===
The library holds a collection of some 25,000 volumes received mainly by donation concentrating on the study of Hindu culture, religion, languages, literature, philosophy, arts and society. Areas of strength include Sanskrit grammar, poetics, philosophy, theology, comparative theology, and religions studies. The collection reached its present size with major donations from scholars across the globe.

== Publishing ==
=== Journal of Hindu Studies ===
Since 2008, the centre has published the Journal of Hindu Studies in partnership with Oxford University Press. The Journal is fully refereed. The aim of the Journal is to create a forum for critical and constructive interdisciplinary discourse, exploring key questions and meta-issues relating to the developing field of Hindu Studies.

The Journal currently publishes three issues a year, one guest-edited and one open for submissions. Each issue contains approximately six articles in addition to book reviews, occasional review articles, and reports on work in progress. The third issue usually publishes conference and panel papers. The first two issues are on the same broad annual theme. These themes focus on theoretical meta-issues that are relevant to all fields within Hindu Studies, linking scholars in interdisciplinary dialogue. Themes published to date include: Hermeneutics and Interpretation, Aesthetics and the Arts, and Reason and Rationality. The disciplines represented in the Journal presently include History, Philology, Literature and the Arts, Philosophy, Anthropology, Sociology, Archaeology, and Religious Studies.

The Journal is edited by James Madaio, Gavin Flood, Jessica Frazier, and Rembert Lutjeharms.

=== Hindu Studies Book Series ===
The OCHS Hindu Studies book series, has proven to be a successful association with Routledge, the publisher. The series publishes books covering areas of constructive Hindu theological, philosophical and ethical research which aims to bring Hindu traditions into dialogue with contemporary trends in scholarship and contemporary society. This includes annotated translations of important primary sources and studies in the history of the Hindu religious traditions. The series has attracted original, high quality, research level work on religion, culture and society of Hindus living in India and abroad.

The series editor is the centre's academic director, Professor Gavin Flood. The previous series editor was Professor Francis X. Clooney, SJ, of Harvard University, 2003–2005. Professor Clooney served as the centre's academic director from 2002 to 2004.

=== Archaeology and Religion in South Asia Series ===
The centre, in association with Routledge, launched the Archeology and Religion in South Asia book series. This series publishes books that tackle questions of South Asian religion and society from the perspective of archaeological evidence. Underpinning the series is an approach that is motivated by close study of inscriptions, iconography, numismatics, and archaeological remains (particularly of shrines and diverse sacred sites). The Series Editor is Professor Himanshu Prabhu Ray, an emeritus professor at Jawaharlal Nehru University and a former Shivdasani Visiting Fellow.

=== Online Lecture Library ===
The OCHS has an Online Library of hundreds of MP3 recordings of lectures and seminars. Stretching from 2001 to the present and growing with each new term, the library ranges from introductory surveys of major Hindu themes, texts and traditions; single lectures on topics like Women in the Mahabharata or Poetry in the Vedas; discussions with Jewish, Muslim, and Christian Scholars, and seminars on Hindi Cinema. The OCHS also puts out podcasts. Its weekly lecture podcast had over 15,000 subscribers (in 2007).

== Research ==
Research projects at OCHS fall under four general headings: 1. Hinduism and modernity 2. Classical Hinduism 3. Religious dialogue and interface 4. Historical perspectives on Hindu cultures.

=== Current research projects ===
==== Bengali Vaishnavism in the Modern Period ====
Project director: Ferdinando Sardella, Lucian Wong

This project undertakes an interdisciplinary survey of modern Bengali Vaishnavism from the mid-18th century to the mid-20th century. Part of this work involves the mapping, collection, and translation of relevant literature from this period. The six main areas of research in regards to Bengali Vaishnavism are: 1) theology and philosophy, 2) history, 3) transnational currents and the development of modern institutions, 4) case studies and biography, 5) human rights, gender, family, and caste, and 6) theoretical and methodological issues. The project was launched with a workshop at Worcester College (2015) on which a volume was published.

==== Bhagavata Purana Project ====
Project directors: Ravi M. Gupta, Kenneth R. Valpey

This research project assesses the Bhagavata Purana together with its context and consolidates past scholarship on the text. Its first phase saw the publication of a volume of research articles entitled Bhagavata: The Bhāgavata Purāṇa: Sacred Text and Living Tradition (2013) and the publication of an annotated and abridged translation of the Bhagavata Purana (2016), both by Columbia University Press. Phase two of the project was marked by a large international conference in Chennai with the University of Madras that brought together the network of scholars in the field. The BORI in its partnership with the OCHS has compiled a database of Bhagavata Purana manuscripts and secondary literature and is assessing a critical edition of the text.

==== Shakta Traditions Project ====
Project directors: Bjarne Wernicke-Olesen, Gavin Flood

The Shakta Traditions project takes an interdisciplinary approach to investigating Goddess (Devi) worship among the Brahmanical community, in Tantric practices, and at the village level. The project aims to carve out space for the tradition within the Indian religious context by defining its theology, textual lineage, historical evolution, and its relationship to parallel traditions such as Shaivism. It has produced several international conferences and symposia, such as the international Shakta Traditions conference (2011), as well as numerous conference volumes published by the Oxford University Press and Routledge. In 2018, Bjarne Oleson established a study and research centre for the project in Kathmandu with a focus on manuscript collection and preservation and fieldwork. The Shakta Traditions project resulted from the memorandum of understanding between the OCHS and Aarhus University and is run as a collaboration between the two institutions.

==== The Goswami Project ====
Project Managers: Kiyokazu Okita, Rembert Lutjeharms

This project investigates the formative period of Gaudiya Vaishnavism through research into the Sanskrit writings of the Goswamis, a group of early followers of Krishna Chaitanya whose works provided the theological underpinning of the Gaudiya Vaishnava tradition. The core of the project involves preparing critical editions and translations of important Goswami texts. Other branches of the project involve study of early Gaudiya Vaishnavism's relation to contemporaneous Vaishnava schools, the theology of authors who inspired the Goswamis, how the Goswamis' teachings were developed by later Vaishnavas, and the material culture of the early Gaudiyas. The project was launched with a two-day workshop entitled 'The Building of Vrindavana' (2017).

=== Conferences ===
The centre hosts interdisciplinary conferences and symposia. These gatherings have dealt with topics including the idea of Desire, Women in Hinduism, Philosophy, Archaeology, temple art and architecture, and Shakta Traditions.

The Shivdasani conferences synthesized the work being done in various projects. The first conference (2007) was held in Trinity College and was titled Archaeology and Text: The Temple in South Asia. It helped launch the centre's Archeology and Text Project. The proceedings of this conference were published by Oxford University Press, in 2009. The second Shivdasani Conference (2009) – Thinking Inside the Box: The Concept of a Category in Indian Philosophy– took place at Somerville College. It explored linguistic, aesthetic, and ontological categories as they appear in Indian schools of philosophy, simultaneously bringing these ideas into dialogue with Western methods and launching the Categories in Indian Philosophy research project.

The centre has held several conferences and symposia for the Shakta Traditions project. It held the first international Shakta Traditions conference (2011) with approximately fifty participants and twelve specialist scholars. The conference took an interdisciplinary survey of Shakta history, practice, and doctrine with the aim of exploring the tradition's uniqueness in the context of the Indian religious landscape. The centre also held symposiums on Shakta Traditions in 2017 and in 2018. In order to further develop the Bhagavata Purana Project, the OCHS held a conference in Chennai co-hosted by the University of Madras and C.P. Ramaswami Aiyar Foundation titled 'The Bhāgavata Purāṇa: History, Philosophy, and Culture' (2017). To officially launch the Gosvami Era Project, a two-day workshop titled 'The Building of Vrindavana' (2017), was held at Oxford. The OCHS has also organized conferences dealing with comparative theology - notably a conference on 'Desire in Christianity and Indian Religions' (2007) and a conference on 'Surrender to God in Islam, Christianity, and Hinduism' (2008).

=== Outreach projects ===
==== Chaplaincy ====
Shaunaka Rishi Das, the director of the OCHS, is the first Hindu Chaplain to the University of Oxford. He regularly meets Hindu and Jain students to offer pastoral guidance. The Centre facilitates HUM, the Oxford University Hindu Society. Shaunaka Rishi also serves as Chaplain at various local hospitals. The centre has developed a chaplaincy course for the Free University of Amsterdam. It was designed by Dr Nick Sutton and Anuradha Dooney in conjunction with Vineet Chander from Princeton University. In 2017, they, along with Shaunaka Rishi Das, explored the emerging institution of Hindu chaplaincy in a book titled 'Hindu Chaplaincy: The Oxford Centre for Hindu Studies Guide'. As discussed in the book, they take interest in the task of translating a conventionally Christian notion of Chaplaincy into Hindu terms.

==== The Bhumi Project ====
The Bhumi Project is one of the centre's key outreach programs and aims to mobilize Hindus against climate change globally. It was launched in partnership with the Alliance of Religions and Conservation in 2009 and with input from the four largest Hindu temples in the UK. Its inauguration was held at Windsor Castle in the presence of Prince Philip and Ban Ki-moon, Secretary-General of the United Nations. The project encourages Hindu communities to develop plans to transform their environmental practices. The Bhumi Project uniquely dialogues with these groups by making a case for environmentalism grounded in Hindu scripture, an approach exemplified in its published petition, the "Hindu Declaration on Climate Change". The Bhumi Project then works with them by providing them with resources and the chance to take on over twenty projects. The Centre helped launch the Bhumi Pledge in 2015, in which it invited students worldwide to make a pledge to care for the environment and organize an environmental awareness event on their campus. The Bhumi Project has also facilitated Hindu Environment Week for several years, in which events to raise awareness of environmental issues are held across the world (India, UK, US) - there were over 10,000 global participants in 2015. Members of the Bhumi Project have participated in panels, conferences (such as the annual COP22 UN climate change negotiations), and interfaith events (such as the 2017 interfaith talks in Delhi with Islamic Relief and EcoSikh). The centre has launched with GreenFaith for this project.

==== The Dow Jones Dharma Index ====
In October 2006, after being invited by the Emerging Markets Group (EMG), the OCHS began work with Dow Jones in creating the Dharma Index. This index serves as an investing guide for Hindu and Buddhist communities by integrating dharmic ethical considerations into its investment calculus. The OCHS brought together academics, financial experts, and religious leaders (both Hindu and Buddhist) to form three committees tasked with creating the Index. The final document contains five indices, one each for the global market, USA, India, UK, and Japan. It also contains an overview of dharmic ethical values along with guidelines for their practical application in investment. The Index was launched on 15 Jan 2008 at the Taj Hotel, Mumbai.

==== The British Hinduism Oral History Project ====
For the first time, the experiences of 300 first generation Hindus who settled in Britain were recorded, transcribed, given a web presence, and archived. This three-year project, launched at the Indian High Commission, London, in 2001, was funded by the Heritage Lottery Foundation.

==== Hindu Youth Research Project ====
The Hindu Youth Research Project, conducted in 2001, is the first survey of its kind in the UK, developed with the assistance of the Hindu Youth Festival 2001. The results have served to make the concerns and experiences of young British Hindus known to government, media and the public.

==== Digital Shikshapatri ====
This project provides online access to an important part of the British Hindu cultural heritage. The Shikshapatri manuscript is part of the Sanskrit manuscript collection of Oxford's Bodleian Library. The text was written by Shree Swaminarayan, founder of Swaminarayan Hinduism, and is a religious manual for daily life. The project aimed at helping people of all backgrounds to better understand the significance of this popular manuscript. The project also proved to be a good example of how scholars and community members successfully worked together for a common goal. The project was a collaborative venture between the OCHS, the Indian Institute Library, and the Refugee Studies Centre of Oxford University, was funded by The New Opportunities Fund, and lasted from 2001 to 2003.

=== Partnerships with academic institutions ===
The OCHS has entered into partnerships and Memoranda of Understanding (MoUs) with academic institutions across the world — from India, institutions such as the C.P. Ramaswami Aiyar Institute of Indological Research (CPRIIR), the University of Madras, and the University of Mumbai.

The relevance of such partnerships is exemplified by the centre's partnership with Nepal Sanskrit University (NSU) and the Bhandarkar Oriental Research Institute (BORI). Through the MoU with Nepal Sanskrit University in 2014, the Centre gains access to the National Archive of Nepal's large selection of rare, unedited, and unpublished Sanskrit and Nepali manuscripts. Since 2016, the BORI's partnership with the OCHS on the Bhagavata Purana Project has led to great strides in the project. The BORI is engaging in a lengthy assessment of the critical edition of the Bhagavata Purana published by the BJ Institute of Learning and Research. In collaboration with the OCHS, they are analyzing the methodology used to put together this critical edition, taking into consideration dozens of other manuscripts, and are finally assessing whether the BJ Institute's critical edition is the most genuine manuscript. Besides this, the team has also researched the living traditions of the Bhagavata Purana in Maharashtra and is creating a collection of data on the text of the Bhagavata Purana and related texts. This work has contributed much to the ongoing phase two of the Bhagavata Purana Project.

The centre has signed MoUs with places across the globe, including the University of Florida (UF), the Chinese University of Hong Kong, and Aarhus University. The UF's collaboration with the OCHS inspired the creation of a centre at the University of Florida called the Centre for the Study of Hindu Traditions (CHiTra), paralleling the OCHS in its aims. The centre's MoU with Aarhus University resulted in a program allowing Sanskrit students at Aarhus to spend a semester at the centre as visiting students. Several Danish students have taken advantage of this opportunity. The MoU also led the establishment of a new research unit for South Asian Religion (SAR) at Aarhus. These collaborations have proven to be effective ways for the centre to bring its ideas and approaches to other academic institutions.
