= Steven J. Rosen =

American writer

Satyaraja Das
- Born: Steven J. Rosen; October 20, 1955 (age 71); New York, New York, U.S.
- Occupation: Writer
- Writing career
- Notable works: The Hidden Glory of India, Essential Hinduism

Steven J. Rosen, also known as Satyaraja Das (IAST: Satya-rāja dāsa; born October 20, 1955), is an American writer. He is the founding editor of The Journal of Vaishnava Studies and an associate editor of Back to Godhead, the magazine of the International Society for Krishna Consciousness. He has authored more than 30 books on Vaishnavism and related subjects, including Black Lotus: The Spiritual Journey of an Urban Mystic (2007), which is the life story of Bhakti Tirtha Swami. He is a disciple of A.C. Bhaktivedanta Swami Prabhupada.

== Works ==
- Food for the Spirit: Vegetarianism and the World Religions, Preface by Isaac Bashevis Singer, Bala Books, 1987, ISBN 978-0896470224
- Archeology and the Vaishnava Tradition: The Pre-Christian Roots of Krishna Worship, Firma KLM, 1989
- East-Kṛṣṇa Consciousness and Christianity: East-West Dialogues, Folk Books, 1989, ISBN 0-9619763-1-4
- Om Shalom: Judaism and Krishna Consciousness: Conversations Between Rabbi Jacob N. Shimmel and Satyaraja Dasa Adhikari, Folk Books, 1990, ISBN 0-9619763-3-0
- The Lives of the Vaishnava saints: Shrinivas Acharya, Narottam Das Thakur, Shyamananda Pandit, Folk Books, 1991, ISBN 0-9619763-4-9
- The Six Goswamis of Vrindavan (revised ed.), Folk Books, 1991, ISBN 0-9619763-2-2
- Passage From India: The Life and Times of His divine grace A.C. Bhaktivedanta Swami Prabhupāda: A Summary Study of Satsvarūpa Dāsa Goswamī's Śrīla Prabhupāda Līlāmr̥ta, Munshiram Manoharlal, 1992, ISBN 81-215-0558-5
- Narasimha Avatar: The Half-Man/Half-Lion Incarnation, Folk Books, 1994, ISBN 81-87812-29-X
- Śrī Pañca Tattva: The Five Features of God, Folk Books, 1994, ISBN 0-9619763-7-3
- Vaisnavism: Contemporary Scholars Discuss the Gaudiya Tradition, Motilal Banarsidass, 1994, ISBN 81-208-1235-2
- Vaiṣṇavī: Women and the Worship of Krishna, Motilal Banarsidass, 1996, ISBN 81-208-1438-X
- Diet for Transcendence: Vegetarianism and the World Religions, Torchlight, 1997, ISBN 1-887089-05-5
- The Reincarnation Controversy: Uncovering the Truth in the World Religions, Torchlight Publishing, 1997, ISBN 1-887089-11-X
- Gita on the Green: The Mystical Tradition Behind Bagger Vance, Continuum International Publishing Group, 2000, ISBN 0-8264-1365-X
- Holy War: Violence and the Bhagavad Gita, Deepak Heritage Books, 2002, ISBN 0-937194-44-1
- The Hidden Glory of India, Bhaktivedanta Book Trust, 2002, ISBN 0-89213-351-1
- From Nothingness to Personhood: A Collection of Essays on Buddhism from a Vaishnava-Hindu Perspective, Rasbihari Lal & Sons, 2003, ISBN 81-87812-43-5
- Holy Cow: The Hare Krishna Contribution to Vegetarianism and Animal Rights, Lantern Books, 2004, ISBN 1-59056-066-3
- Essential Hinduism, Greenwood Publishing Group, 2006, ISBN 0-275-99006-0
- Black Lotus: The Spiritual Journey of an Urban Mystic, Hari-Nama Press, 2007, ISBN 978-1-885414-23-6
- Krishna's Song: A New Look at the Bhagavad Gita, Greenwood Publishing Group, 2007, ISBN 978-0-313-34553-1
- The Yoga of Kirtan: Conversations on the Sacred Art of Chanting, Folk Books, 2008, ISBN 978-0-615-20510-6
- Ultimate Journey: Death and Dying in the World's Major Religions, Greenwood Publishing Group, 2008, ISBN 978-0-313-35608-7
