= One: The Movie =

- Directed by: Ward Powers
- Release date: 2005
- Running time: 79 minutes
- Country: United States

One: The Movie is an independent documentary that surveys beliefs on the meaning of life, matching with the view that "we are all one". The movie was created and directed by Michigan filmmakers Carter Scott, Ward M. Powers and Diane Powers, and featured interviews with Deepak Chopra, Robert Thurman, Thich Nhat Hanh, Jaggi Vasudev, and others.

It was originally released in movie theaters in North America with accompanying promotional events in late 2005 through 2007. An (English version in US) was released on DVD in 2007. The documentary was a focus of discussion in the Global Spirit series' episode Oneness: The Big Picture on LinkTV.

== Content ==
The filmmakers asked twenty questions of religious and spiritual teachers as well as artists, authors, atheists, and people on the street. The answers are accompanied by the image of a "nameless traveler" who has grown weary with the suffering and negativity of the world, and who begins a search for meaning and truth. The documentary covers a range of spiritual and philosophical themes such as the source of fear, enlightenment, spirit, the meaning of life, compassion, life after death, diversity, the nature of God and Heaven, and religion (including Islam, Judaism, Christianity, Buddhism, Hinduism, Sufism, Taoism, New Age, New Thought Spirituality, Hare Krishna, Native American spirituality, Catholicism, Protestantism, and Christian fundamentalism).

ONE also explores contemporary themes of war, conflict, terrorism, peace, global change, social responsibility, and environmental concerns. Prior to editing the movie, the filmmakers consulted with American philosopher Ken Wilber, founder of the Integral Institute. Some of the questions asked to the participants were:

1. Why is there poverty and suffering in the world?
2. What is the relationship between science and religion?
3. Why are so many people depressed?
4. What are we all so afraid of?
5. When is war justifiable?
6. How would God want us to respond to aggression and terrorism?
7. How does one obtain true peace?
8. What does it mean to live in the present moment?
9. What is our greatest distraction?
10. Is current religion serving its purpose?
11. What happens to you after you die?
12. Describe heaven and how to get there?
13. What is the meaning of life?
14. Describe God?
15. What is the greatest quality humans possess?
16. What is it that prevents people from living to their full potential?
17. Non-verbally, by motion or gesture only, act out what you believe to be the current condition of the world.
18. What is your one wish for the world?
19. What is wisdom and how do we gain it?
20. Are we all One?

== Interviews ==
Among the interviewed participants in the documentary can be named the following:

- Deepak Chopra: Alternative medicine advocate,
- Thomas Keating: American Catholic monk and Trappist priest,
- Barbara Marx Hubbard: American futurist, author, and public speaker.
- Riane Eisler: Austrian-born American systems scientist and author who writes about the effect of gender politics historically on society,
- Robert Thurman: American Buddhist author and academic.
- Jaggi Vasudev (Sadhguru): Indian yoga guru and proponent of spirituality.
- Llewellyn Vaughan-Lee: Sufi mystic and lineage successor in the Naqshbandiyya-Mujaddidiyya Sufi Order.
- Mantak Chia: Thail Taoist Master.
- Richard Rohr: American Franciscan priest and writer on spirituality
- Chan Khong: Buddhist Bhikkhunī (nun),
- Hassan Al-Qazwini: Iraqi-American Shia Imam,
- Arnie Sleutelberg: Rabbi Emeritus of Shir Tikvah Congregation in Troy, Michigan.
- Muruga Booker: American drummer, composer, inventor, artist, recording artist, and an autonomous Eastern Orthodox priest.
- Bhakti Tirtha Swami: guru of the International Society for Krishna Consciousness (commonly known as the Hare Krishnas or ISKCON). He was the highest-ranking African American in ISKCON.
- Wayne Teasdale: Catholic monk,
- Ram Dass: Psychologist and Spiritual teacher,
- Thich Nhat Hanh: Vietnamese Thiền Buddhist monk and peace activist.

== Film festival presence ==
- Official Selection of the 2005 Berlin One World International Human Rights Festival
- Official Selection of the 2005 Hawaii International Film Festival
- Official Selection of the 2005 Global Peace Film Festival
- Official Selection of the 2005 Hong Kong Exploring Consciousness Film Festival
- Official Selection of the 2005 South African Exploring Consciousness Film Festival
- Official Selection of the 2005 Waterfront Film Festival
- Award Winner of the 2005 East Lansing Film Festival

== Reception ==
One received mixed reviews. Tom Keogh, writing for The Seattle Times, was largely positive, stating that the film's lack of polish proved to be an asset and that it "looks like a labor of love and is all the more stirring for it". In contrast, G. Allen Johnson, writing for the San Francisco Chronicle, was less impressed by its amateurish quality, stating that it could have used more expertise. He was also critical of the fact that the subjects interviewed in the film were all either "great thinkers" or "fringe players", which undermined the intended theme of the film that we are all interconnected. Sean Axmaker of the Seattle Post-Intelligencer praised the film's "spirit of inquiry", but felt it came across as naïve and criticized its feeling of "false modesty".
