= Kadamba Kanana Swami =

Religious leader

His Holiness Kadamba Kanana Swami
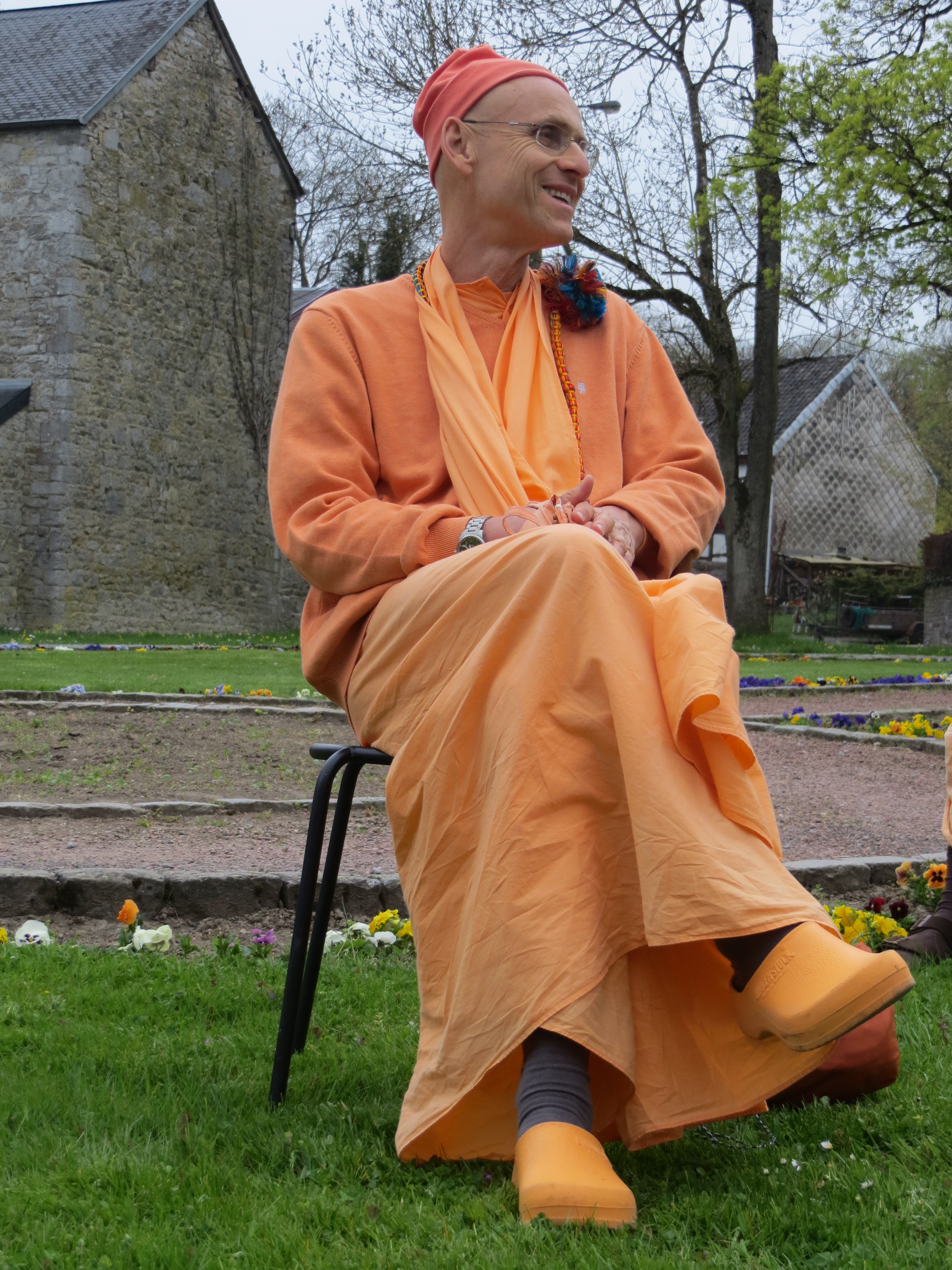

Personal life
- Born: April 12, 1953 Amsterdam, Netherlands
- Died: March 9, 2023 (aged 69) Vrindavan, India
- Website: https://www.kkswami.com/

Religious life
- Religion: Gaudiya Vaishnavism
- Initiation: Diksa–1979, Sannyasa–1997

Senior posting
- Post: ISKCON Guru, ISKCON Sannyasi

Kadamba Kanana Swami (IAST: Kadamba-kānana Svāmī; 1953–2023) was a senior member and initiating guru of the International Society for Krishna Consciousness (ISKCON).

Born on April 12, 1953, in the town of Heemstede, near Amsterdam, Kadamba Kanana Swami ventured to India on a quest to seek out a greater meaning to life. He joined ISKCON's Vrindavan temple, Krishna Balaram Mandir, in 1978, serving in various managerial roles, and went on to become temple president from 1990 to 1995.

In the 1980s, Kadamba Kanana Swami began visiting Australia and Belgium, developing a long-standing relationship with the local communities there. He oversaw the construction of ISKCON founder-acharya A. C. Bhaktivedanta Swami Prabhupada's pushpa samadhi mandir (memorial shrine) in Mayapur, India, and was a member of the Mayapur Administrative Council, the committee that oversees the daily management of the project from 1985 to 1990. Later, he continued with more service in Mayapur from 2012 to 2016 by being part of the executive committee coordinating the development of the master plan.

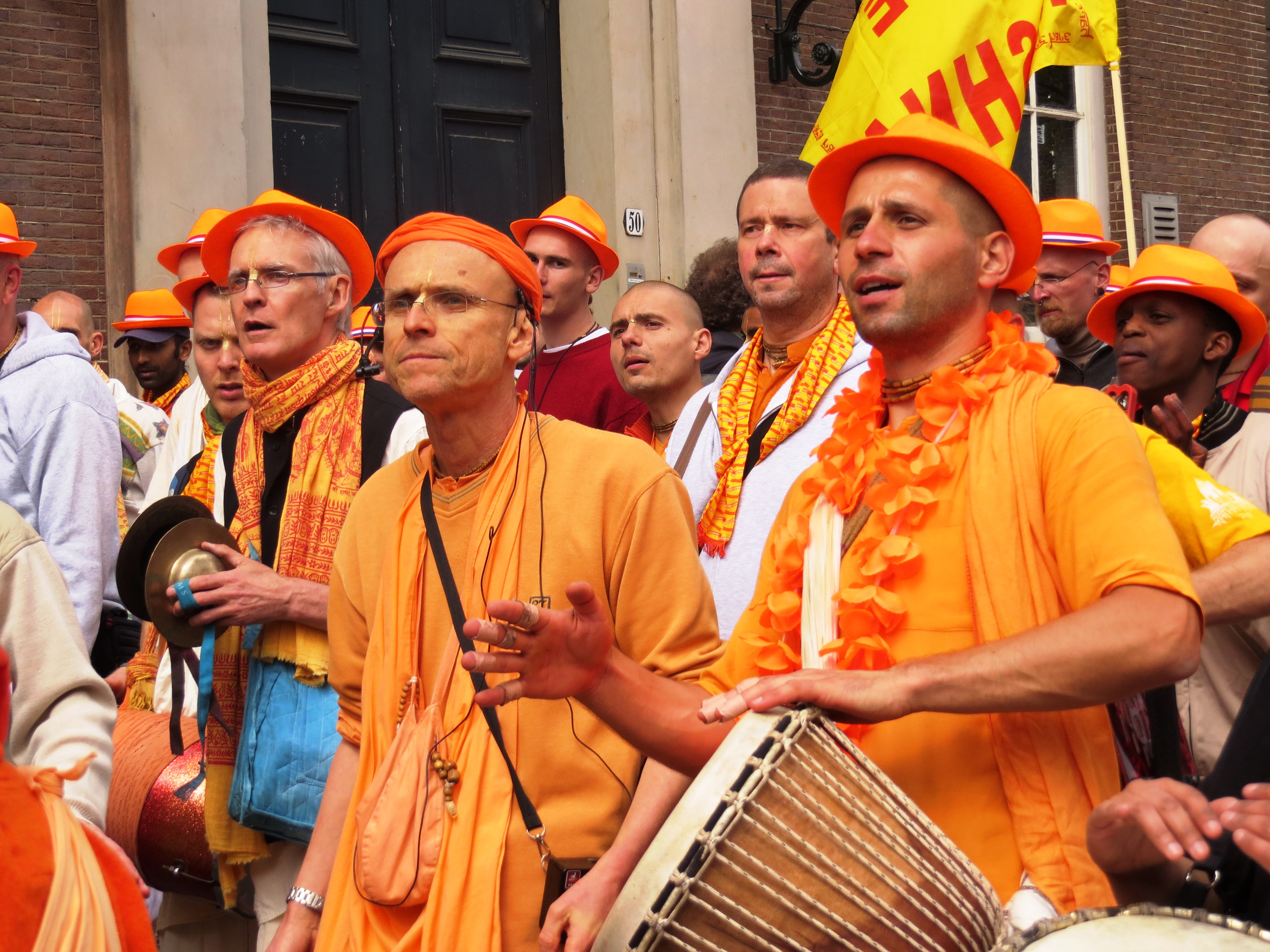

Kadamba Kanana Swami took sannyasa initiation from his guru, Jayadvaita Swami, in 1997 and traveled extensively around the world to spread the message of Lord Caitanya’s movement. As a sannyasi, he had been active in a great variety of projects. He became deeply involved in South Africa and spent substantial time there from 1995 to 2023. In a country with a long history of apartheid, he built bridges between communities and in reaching out to- and in offering support the local African community in Krsna consciousness. In Soweto, he once observed locals dancing in ecstasy in front of a TV that was playing Ratha Yatra kirtans from the Durban festival. This experience touched his heart, and he wanted Soweto to have their own Ratha Yatra festival; consequently he brought the Festival of Chariots there. The first place he was invited to after taking sannyasa was the Czech Republic, where he spent substantial time, and has quite a number of followers there. Radhadesh, in Belgium was started mostly by devotees from the Netherlands, so he had a natural connection there, he has been lecturing at the Bhaktivedanta College and leads the annual King's Day festival harinam, where hundreds of devotees take to the bustling streets of Amsterdam for a day of singing and dancing. From 2000 to 2008 he led the New Vrajamandala Farm and saved the farm from being sold. From 2017 to 2022, he was involved in NYC - the city where Srila Prabhupada began the movement - and helped revive the temple. In 2001, Kadamba Kanana Swami began his service as an initiating spiritual master and had initiated about a thousand disciples across the globe by the time of his death.

Kadamba Kanana Swami authored several books, such as Nothing but the Holy Name, Words of a Public Hermit, Devotional Service, Wonderful Krishna, Kirtaniya Sada Harih, Golokera Prema Dhana, and Under the Desire Trees. Being widely recognized for his melodic voice and up tempo rhythm, Kadamba Kanana Swami had been frequently invited to perform at various singing festivals (kirtan melas) around the world, and has recorded over ten albums to fund the various projects that he supports.

== Death ==
Kadamba Kanana Swami departed from this world at 12:06 p.m. on 9 March 2023 on the day of Tukaram Beej, two days after Gaura Purnima.

== See also ==
- ISKCON guru system
