= Donner Institute =

Finnish institute

Coordinates: 60.45502°N 22.27909°E

The Donner Institute for Research in Religious and Cultural History (or The Donner Institute, Swedish: Donnerska Institutet) is a private institute in Finland maintained by the Åbo Akademi University. The Institute was founded in 1959 with an extensive donation by Uno and Olly Donner. It hosts the largest special library on Comparative Religion in the Nordic countries, supports research in the area of the Institute through grants, and organizes conferences and seminars. It publishes the journal Scripta Instituti Donneriani Aboensis, and the journal Approaching Religion.

== Award ==
In 2010 the Donner Institute established an annual prize for "outstanding research into religion conducted at a Nordic university" to researchers in the field of religious studies for a significant and relatively new published monograph.

The recipients of this award have been:

2010: Ferdinando Sardella of University of Gothenburg, Sweden, for Bhaktisiddhanta Sarasvati: the context and significance of a modern Hindu personalist (2010)

2011: Olle Sundström of Umeå University, for "The Wild Reindeer is Itself the Same as a God": "Gods" and "Spirits" in Soviet Ethnographers' Descriptions of Samoyedic World Views [Swedish: Vildrenen är själv detsamma som en gud": "gudar" och "andar" i sovjetiska etnografers beskrivningar av samojediska världsåskådningar] (2008)

2012: Niklas Foxeus of Stockholm University, Sweden, for : The Buddhist World Emperor's Mission: Millenarian Buddhism in Postcolonial Burma (2011)

2013: Jessica Moberg of Södertörn University, Sweden, for Piety, Intimacy and Mobility. A Case Study of Charismatic Christianity in Present-day Stockholm (2013)
