= Forum for South Asia Studies =

Forum for South Asia Studies (FSAS) is a collaborative academic effort by six faculties of Uppsala University of Sweden aimed at facilitating and promoting research and education related to the South Asian countries: India, Pakistan, Sri Lanka, Nepal, Bangladesh, the Maldives and Afghanistan, on the national and international level.

== Aims ==
The purpose of the Forum for South Asia Studies is to strengthen South Asia related research and education, and increase Uppsala University’s collaboration with the region. The Forum is a coordinated effort by the six faculties that constitute the Humanities and Social Sciences:

- The Faculty of Theology
- The Faculty of Law
- The Faculty of History and Philosophy
- The Faculty of the Social Sciences
- The Faculty of Languages
- The Faculty of Educational Sciences

The FSAS aims at:

- creating an academic environment for collaboration and information in research and education focusing on the South Asian countries: India, Pakistan, Sri Lanka, Nepal, Bangladesh, the Maldives and Afghanistan;
- promoting and making visible South Asia related research and education at Uppsala University to other academic environments and to the general public;
- facilitating international collaboration between scholars in the field of South Asia research and education at Uppsala University and scholars from other universities.

== Education ==
FSAS conducts a student and teacher exchange program between Uppsala University and Calcutta University.

== Administration ==
The administration of the Forum for South Asia Studies is placed at the Department of History.

Margaret Hunt, Faculty of History and Philosophy, is the current director of the FSAS. Other board members are: Siddhartha Dhar, Dept. for Peace and Conflict Resolution; Jens Wilhelm Borgland, Faculty of Theology; Heinz Werner Wessler, Faculty of Languages; Kavita Dasgupta, Faculty of History and Philosophy.
