= Journal of Hindu Studies =

- Discipline: Hindu Studies
- Language: English
- Edited by: Rembert Lutjeharms, James Madaio, and Lucian Wong

Publication details
- History: 2008-present
- Publisher: Oxford University Press
- Frequency: Triannual
- Impact factor: 0.2 (2024)

Standard abbreviations
- ISO 4: J. Hindu Stud.

Indexing
- ISSN: 1756-4255 (print); 1756-4263 (web)
- JSTOR: 17564255
- OCLC no.: 301680132

Links
- Journal homepage

The Journal of Hindu Studies is a triannual peer-reviewed academic journal established in 2008. It is published by Oxford University Press on behalf of the Oxford Centre for Hindu Studies. It covers all aspects of Hindu studies.

Of the three annual issues, one is guest-edited and another is open to general submissions. The third issue usually publishes conference and panel papers. The first two issues are on the same broad annual theme. Themes published to date include: Hermeneutics and Interpretation, Aesthetics and the Arts, and Reason and Rationality.

The disciplines represented in the journal include history, philology, literature and the arts, philosophy, anthropology, sociology, archaeology, and religious studies.

The editors-in-chief are Rembert Lutjeharms (University of Oxford), James Madaio (Czech Academy of Sciences), and Lucian Wong (Oxford Centre for Hindu Studies).
