= Shaunaka Rishi Das =

Hindu theologian

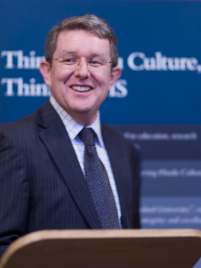
- Board of Governor's Dinner 2010
- Born: Timothy Kiernan; 18 February 1961 (age 65)
- Education: St Peter's College, Wexford
- Title: Director, Oxford Centre for Hindu Studies
- Term: 1997–present
- Spouse: Keshava Kiernan 1958-2013
- Relatives: Kitty Kiernan (first cousin twice removed)

Shaunaka Rishi Das (IAST: Śaunaka Ṛṣi Dāsa; born 18 February 1961 as Timothy Kiernan) is the Director of the Oxford Centre for Hindu Studies (OCHS), a position he has held since the centre's foundation in 1997. He is a lecturer, a broadcaster, and Hindu Chaplain to Oxford University. His interests include education, comparative theology, communication, and leadership. He is a member of The Commission on Religion and Belief in British Public Life, convened in 2013 by the Woolf Institute, Cambridge. In 2013 the Indian government appointed him to sit on the International Advisory Council of the Auroville Foundation. Keshava, Rishi Das's wife of 27 years, died in December 2013.

== Oxford ==
As Director of the Oxford Centre for Hindu Studies he maintains the vision and ethos of the OCHS and encourages the centre's continued growth and development in all spheres. In this role he oversaw the formal recognition of the OCHS by Oxford University in 2006, and developed the centre's publishing partnerships with Oxford University Press, Journal of Hindu Studies, and with the Routledge Hindu Studies Series. He has also been responsible for forging formal relationships between the OCHS and Universities in the US, Europe, India, and China. He is the first Hindu Chaplain to Oxford University in its 800-year history.

== Media and broadcasting ==
He is a regular broadcaster, making the Hindu contribution to 'Prayer for the Day' on BBC Radio 4 since 2007. He was also a participant in the popular History of the World in 100 Objects series broadcast on BBC Radio 4, and published by Allen Lane. He has acted as a consultant for a number of documentaries on Hindu culture and traditions. He has written articles for The Guardian and The Independent newspapers, Business India, and has written the Hindu entry for the Annual Register since 2004.

== Interfaith and theological dialogue ==
Shaunaka Rishi Das, by way of an invitation to the International Colloquium of Christians and Jews, was introduced to the world of inter-religious dialogue, in 1985, by the then Chief Rabbi of Ireland, Rabbi David Rosen. From that time he developed a personal interest, and played an active part in such dialogue. He was an early member of the Northern Ireland Interfaith Forum, acting as its chairman from 1998 to 2002. From 2002 -2004 he was a trustee and executive member of The Interfaith Network UK, and from 1998 to 2004 acted as a consultant to the International Interfaith Centre, Oxford.

Rishi Das has been a pioneer in promoting interfaith and comparative theological dialogue in his own community. As the first Convenor of the ISKCON Interfaith Commission (1997–2010) he led the consultation which resulted in the publication of ISKCON's Statement on Relating with People of Faith in God, which has been translated into six languages, and forms part of the course curriculum at Bhaktivedanta College, Belgium.

This Interfaith statement was a significant step for ISKCON, addressing issues of integration in a global society, as well as laying out a clear theological basis for dialogue. It has also been recognised as a pioneering statement from any Hindu tradition, advocating informed engagement with others over presenting a position of policy to others. Responses to the document noted its importance in addressing modern issues while keeping with the integrity of the ancient tradition.

But we Christians may also recognise a new factor, namely that ISKCON is the first global Vaisnava movement that is just now coming to understand its vocation to enable Westerners to understand Indian philosophy and spirituality. – Rev. Kenneth Cracknell

He has also been responsible for facilitating various conferences, seminars, and symposia promoting Vaishnava-Christian dialogue at different levels. He was instrumental, along with his colleagues, Anuttama Das, and Rukmini Devi Dasi in launching the annual Vaishnava-Christian conferences, held in Washington, D.C., since 1997.

== Personal faith ==
Born an Irish Catholic, and expressing an early interest in the priesthood, Rishi Das joined a International Society for Krishna Consciousness ashram, in Dublin, in 1979. In 1982 he was given Brahmanical initiation – ordained as a priest – in the Gaudiya Vaishnava tradition.

Inspired by biblical and philosophical reading, which began when he was fourteen, Rishi Das developed a broad interest in spirituality. He said of this early period:

...to love the Lord our God with all our heart, all our words and all our deeds, and love our neighbor as ourselves struck me as an instruction, as a plea, and actually, as a necessity. Considering how to do to that, how to forsake all and follow God out of love has provided me my greatest challenge in life.

Joining a Hindu movement in the Ireland of his time did not feel like a courageous act for Rishi Das. Of his first encounters with the International Society for Krishna Consciousness (ISKCON) he said:

They were speaking Christianity but not calling it that. I knew I had met the people I was to practice with. My desire was to be a Christian. I had to struggle with the fact that I found it being practiced to the highest standard by non-Christians.

To sample his spiritual thought in the form of prayer we can refer to one of his BBC Broadcasts:

Dear Lord, my desire is to serve you, and I offer what I think is best. Please let me know what You desire, and bless me with the grace to accept what you think is best.

Moreover, there is proof of his sense of humour.

== ISKCON ==
Shaunaka Rishi Das was editor-in-chief of the ISKCON Communications Journal, from 1993 until 2006, and was Chairman of ISKCON Communications Europe from 1991 to 2003. He served as an executive member of ISKCON's Ministry of Educational Development from 1996 to 2010, was a founding member of the ISKCON Studies Institute, is a trustee of Bhaktivedanta College in Belgium, and is Editor-in-Chief of the ISKCON Studies Journal.

== See also ==
- Oxford Centre for Hindu Studies
