= ISKCON Communications Journal =

Indian Hindu magazine

- Editor: Shaunaka Rishi Das
- Categories: Hindu studies
- Frequency: Biannual
- Publisher: International Society for Krishna Consciousness
- Founded: 1994
- Final issue: 2005
- Website: content.iskcon.org/icj/index.html
- ISSN: 1358-3867
- OCLC: 425957799

The ISKCON Communications Journal (ICJ) was a biannual magazine of dialogue, focussing on issues related to missionary development in ISKCON (International Society for Krishna Consciousness) and with issues of communication, administration, social development and education which affected mission in ISKCON. ICJ also provided a forum for members of various communities to comment on ISKCON's development. It was established in 1993 and was published by ISKCON Communications Europe until its last issue appeared in 2005.

The ICJ came to be regarded by scholars as ISKCON's intellectual magazine and published papers by a number of prominent scholars. British sociologist James Beckford saw the ICJ as an example of the contribution of religious movements to their own academic study. Beckford held that the magazine showed how "organic intellectuals" of ISKCON were discussing their research and ideas with scholars and in some cases conducting joint research. According to the Danish religious studies scholar Mikael Rothstein, the magazine was a means of internal communication in ISKCON, as well as forum for dialogue with academics. In his view, the magazine represented ISKCON's fundamental interest in good relations with the academic community.

The founder and commissioning editor of ICJ throughout its life was Shaunaka Rishi Das.
