= Jayadvaita Swami =

American Hare Krishna (born 1949)

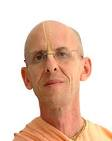

Personal life
- Born: November 2, 1949 (age 77)
- Website: http://www.jswami.info

Religious life
- Religion: Hinduism
- Initiation: Diksa–1968, Sannyasa–1978

Religious career
- Post: Trustee, The Bhaktivedanta Book Trust, spiritual teacher, Sannyasi

Jayadvaita Swami (IAST: Jayādvaita Svāmī), a Gaudiya Vaishnava swami, (born 2 November 1949) is an editor, writer, publisher, and teacher and a disciple of A. C. Bhaktivedanta Swami Prabhupada, founder of the International Society for Krishna Consciousness (ISKCON). He was the seniormost editor for the Bhaktivedanta Book Trust for more than forty years. He served as a trustee for the Book Trust from 1988 through 2017. He has been described as "one of ISKCON's most independent-minded and respected thinkers." He is the author of Vanity Karma: Ecclesiastes, the Bhagavad-gita, and the meaning of life, a cross-cultural commentary on the biblical book of Ecclesiastes. The book won the 2016 Benjamin Franklin Book Award from the Independent Book Publishers Association as the best book in the "religion" category.

== Early life ==
Jayadvaita Swami was born Jay Israel to a Reform Jewish family. He spent his childhood in Englewood, New Jersey, where he attended Dwight Morrow High School. In 1968 in New York City, he was first introduced to Krishna Consciousness and received initiation from Srila Prabhupada. Jay shaved his head, received the spiritual name Jayadvaita Dasa, and began to study the teachings of Krishna. Practically the first task assigned to him in ISKCON was to staple booklets. Later he went on to become the editor of dozens of books and magazines. He was engaged in transcribing Srila Prabhupada's dictation for books, and then typesetting, proofreading, managing book production, and editing. Although before joining ISKCON Jayadvaita attended some college classes at Carnegie Institute of Technology, "he is in the most general sense self-educated and taught himself everything he needed to know in order to become a literary editor".

== After Sannyasa ==
In 1978, at the age of 29, he accepted the order of renounced life (sannyasa) from Satsvarupa dasa Goswami. In 1985 and 1986, he spent a year and a half traveling with a party of pilgrims on padayatra, a journey on foot, through various states of India, stopping in a different town or village every night. From 1991 through most of 1998, he served as editor in chief of Back to Godhead magazine, for which he had been an assistant editor for several years. He later served as editor for a three-volume translation and commentary for Brihad-bhagavatamrita, a sixteenth-century Sanskrit philosophical and devotional work. Still later, he served as editor for Tattva Sandarbha, another sixteenth-century Sanskrit philosophical work. Jayadvaita Swami has also been involved in debates with the proponents of the "ritvik" doctrine, an unusual notion about discipular succession he regards as contrary both to tradition and to Srila Prabhupada's teachings.

Apart from his services in publishing, Jayadvaita Swami travels widely, teaching and lecturing in over 50 countries.
