= Back to Godhead =

Main magazine of the Hare Krishna Movement

Back to Godhead (a.k.a. BTG) is the main magazine of the International Society for Krishna Consciousness (ISKCON), also known as the Hare Krishna Movement. The magazine was founded by A. C. Bhaktivedanta Swami Prabhupada in 1944, under the direction of his spiritual guru, Bhaktisiddhanta Sarasvati. It was originally published by A. C. Bhaktivedanta Swami Prabhupada and later by Satsvarupa dasa Goswami and Jayadvaita Swami.

Back to Godhead was originally, and for some decades, a self-published leaflet by Swami A. C. Bhaktivedanta himself. Responsibility for production was taken over in 1966 by some of his followers in the US, and shaped into a polished, glossy magazine. It was translated and published internationally in German, French, Spanish, and other languages; the English-language version reached a peak circulation of about 500,000 copies in the 1970s.

The magazine is intended for two main audiences. First are the committed devotees of the movement, who read it as a guide to ISKCON religious teachings and culture. Following the 1977 death of Swami A. C. Bhaktivedanta, and subsequent splintering within the movement, the magazine helped to sustain some coherence. The second target audience is the general public, to whom the magazine was often offered as an instrument for promotion, preaching, recruitment, and conversion. It also functioned as a fundraising tool, as the devotees who handed out copies would ask for a donation, though this practice ended in the 1980s following public criticism.

Most of the magazine's content addresses the religious beliefs and practices of the movement and its devotees. A large number of the articles are reprinted from Swami A. C. Bhaktivedanta's writings, or transcripts of his lectures. It has also reported on the group's practical initiatives, temples, farms, charitable activities, festivals and feasts, and calls to worship.

Bhagavad Darshanam (Malayalam: ഭഗവദ് ദർശനം), published since 31 July 2010, is the monthly Malayalam edition of the Back to Godhead magazine.

Jau Devachiya Gava (Marathi: जाऊ देवाचिया गावा, lit. 'Go back to the abode of God') is the monthly Marathi edition of the Back to Godhead magazine.

== History ==
In 1944, A. C. Bhaktivedanta Swami Prabhupada founded Back to Godhead magazine in Calcutta and published it sporadically between 1944 and 1966, despite India's war-related paper shortage. The first issue was published in February of 1944 in Calcutta at the founder's home who wrote the articles, typed the manuscripts, and designed a logo similar to the logo used today. Most of the issues published between 1944 and 1960 were tabloid sized—one sheet folded in half making four pages of type. The founder wrote almost all the articles, oversaw the printing of a thousand copies of each issue, and single-handedly distributed every copy.

In 1965 (age 70), he left for New York with the determination to fulfill a mission given to him by his own spiritual guru, Bhaktisiddhanta Sarasvati, to spread Krishna Consciousness throughout the English-speaking world. In the fall of 1966, after establishing the first center of the International Society for Krishna Consciousness in New York City, the founder handed over the job of writing and publishing the Back to Godhead magazine to his first disciples. In the basement of a storefront on Manhattan's Lower East Side, he produced the first American issue—a simple twenty-eight page mimeographed and stapled piece—which had a distribution of one hundred copies and focused on helping readers understand their relationship with Krishna and how to love Krishna. The first issues in America were printed on a mimeograph machine the founder purchased secondhand from a country club in Queens.

In the 1970s, through sankirtana (public chanting), the Back to Godhead magazine arose to its height of circulation, doubling each year from 1974 to 1976, peaking near half a million, though it had very few subscribers and was distributed to individuals on street corners.

In the late 1970s, circulation began to drop as ISKCON focused more on small books as a cheaper means to spread their philosophy, which, with a change in readership and evolving format, continued to decline in the 1980s.

In 1991, with a drastically cut circulation, the Back to Godhead magazine reemerged double in size (64 pages) with bimonthly (every two months) issues and was for the first time subscription driven, targeting three audiences: devotees, Indians, and Westerners. The focus changed from introducing to appealing to those already interested.

== Purpose ==
The front banner on the Back to Godhead magazine bears the motto:

Godhead is Light, Nescience is darkness. Where there is Godhead there is no Nescience.

The magazine's website lists the following as its purposes:

1. To help all people discern reality from illusion, spirit from matter, the eternal from the temporary.
2. To expose the faults of materialism.
3. To offer guidance in the Vedic techniques of spiritual life.
4. To preserve and spread the Vedic culture.
5. To celebrate the chanting of the holy names of God as taught by Lord Chaitanya Mahaprabhu.
6. To help every living being remember and serve Sri Krishna, the Personality of Godhead.

== Published issues ==
From 1944 to 2023 (80 years), 456 issues of the Back to Godhead magazine were published.

=== 1944 to 1960 ===
From 1944 to 1960 (17 years), 29 issues of the Back to Godhead magazine were published. These issues were published in India by the founder for 5 years during a 17-year period. There were no publications from 1961 to 1965.

- Vol. 1 Parts 1, 2, 3 & 4 (14 Feb 1944) (Note: Vol. 1 Parts 1–4 (1944): "1944 - February 14 - Publishes the first 'Back to Godhead' magazine on Srila Bhaktisiddhanta Sarasvati Thakura's appearance day." .)
- Vol. 1 Part 2 (Oct 1944)
- Vol. 1 Part 8 (16 Feb 1952)
- Vol. 1 Part 9 (Mar 1952)
- Vol. 3 Part 1 (1 Mar 1956)
- Vol. 3 Part 2 (16 Mar 1956)
- Vol. 3 Part 3 (5 Apr 1956)
- Vol. 3 Part 4 (20 Apr 1956)
- Vol. 3 Part 5 (5 May 1956)
- Vol. 3 Part 6 (20 May 1956)
- Vol. 3 Part 7 (5 Jun 1956)
- Vol. 3 Part 8 (20 Jun 1956)
- Vol. 3 Part 9 (5 Oct 1956)
- Vol. 3 Part 10 (20 Oct 1956)
- Vol. 3 Part 11 (5 Nov 1956)
- Vol. 3 Part 12 (20 Nov 1956)
- Vol. 3 Part 13 (20 Oct 1958)
- Vol. 3 Part 14 (20 Nov 1958)
- Vol. 3 Part 15 (20 Feb 1960)
- Vol. 3 Part 16 (20 Mar 1960)
- Vol. 3 Part 17 (5 Apr 1960)
- Vol. 3 Part 18 (20 Apr 1960)
- Vol. 3 Part 19 (5 May 1960)
- Vol. 3 Part 20 (20 May 1960)
- Vol. 3 Part 21 (5 Jun 1960)
- Vol. 3 Part 22 (5 Jul 1960)
- Vol. 3 Part 23 (20 Jul 1960)
- Vol. 3 Part 24 (5 Aug 1960)
- Vol. 4 Part 1 (5 Sep 1960)

=== 1966 to 1974 ===
From 1966 to 1974 (9 years), 68 issues of the Back to Godhead magazine were published. These publications maintain a continuous issue number with the exception of the first two issues of 1968. Most of the publications are missing the publication month and some the year. These and future publications were published after the founder re-established the Back to Godhead magazine in the United States and handed over the job of writing and publishing to his disciples.

- Vol. 1 No. 1 (23 Oct 1966)
- Vol. 1 No. 2 (12 Nov 1966)
- Vol. 1 No. 3 (1 Dec 1966)
- Vol. 1 No. 4 (15 Dec 1966)
- Vol. 1 No. 5 (1 Jan 1967)
- Vol. 1 No. 6 (20 Jan 1967)
- Vol. 1 No. 7 (1 Feb 1967)
- Vol. 1 No. 8 (15 Feb 1967)
- Vol. 1 No. 9 (1 Mar 1967)
- Vol. 1 No. 10 (20 Mar 1967)
- Vol. 1 No. 11 (c. 27 Apr 1967) (Note: Vol. 1 No. 11 (Apr 1967): "The above picture is reproduced from the front page of the Boston Globe, April 27, 1967." "Please forgive the late appearance of this issue, which is in fact out of sequence" see "BY THE MERCY OF KRISHNA".)
- Vol. 1 No. 12 (21 Apr 1967)
- Vol. 1 No. 13 (Jun 1967)
- Vol. 1 No. 14 (1967)
- Vol. 1 No. 15 (c. 30 Aug 1967) (Note: Vol. 1 No. 15 (1967): "This issue falls just after the Appearance Days of the Supreme Lord, Sri Krishna, and of our Spiritual Master, Sri Bhaktivedanta Swami" p. 4. Janmastami on 28 Aug 1967 and Prabhupada's vyasa-puja on 29 Aug 1967 .)
- Vol. 2 Nos. 1–2 (1968)
- No. 18 (c. 1 Jul 1968) (Note: No. 18 (1968): Advertised "on sale July 1st" in previous issue p. 26.)
- No. 19 (c. 1 Oct 1968) (Note: No. 19 (1968): Advertised "on sale October 1st" in previous issue p. 20.)
- No. 20 (c. 1 Nov 1968) (Note: No. 20 (1968): Advertised "on sale November 1st" in previous issue p. 29.)
- No. 21 (c. 1 Dec 1968) (Note: No. 21 (1968): Advertised "on sale December 1st" in previous issue p. 20.)
- No. 22 (28 Feb 1969)
- No. 23 (18 Apr 1969)
- No. 24 (Aug 1969)
- No. 25 (Sep 1969)
- No. 26 (Oct 1969)
- Nos. 27–31 (1969)
- Nos. 32–38 (1970)
- Nos. 39–44 (c. 1971)
- Nos. 45–50 (c. 1972)
- Nos. 51–60 (1973)
- Nos. 61–68 (1974)

=== 1975 to 1989 ===
From 1975 to 1989 (15 years), 161 issues of the Back to Godhead magazine were published across 15 volumes, each having 11 issues with the exception of 10 issues in volumes 15 and 16, and 9 issues in volume 24. These publications have a yearly volume number, where volume 1 is assigned to 1966. Each issue number corresponds to a month with some publications spanning two months (e.g. 1 = Jan; 2/3 = Feb/Mar; 12 = Dec). The first issue of 1978 was written in remembrance of the founder, who died in November of 1977. There were no publications in 1990 when the Back to Godhead magazine was being restructured.

- Vol. 10 (1975) Nos. 1–4, 5/6, 7–12
- Vols. 11–12 (1976–77) Nos. 1–2, 3/4, 5–12
- Vol. 13 (1978) Nos. 1/2, 3–12
- Vol. 14 (1979) Nos. 1, 2/3, 4–12
- Vols. 15–16 (1980–81) Nos. 1/2, 3/4, 5–12
- Vols. 17–23 (1982–88) Nos. 1, 2/3, 4–12
- Vol. 24 (1989) Nos. 1/2, 3–10

=== 1991 to present ===
From 1991 to 2023 (33 years), 198 issues of the Back to Godhead magazine were published with 6 issues per a yearly volume. Each issue number corresponds to a two-month period (e.g. 1 = Jan/Feb; 6 = Nov/Dec).

- Vols. 25–57 (1991–2023) Nos. 1–6
