= Journal of Vaishnava Studies =

- Discipline: Hindu studies
- Language: English
- Edited by: Steven J. Rosen

Publication details
- History: 1992-present
- Publisher: The Institute for Vaishnava Studies (United States of America)
- Frequency: Biannual

Standard abbreviations
- ISO 4: J. Vaishnava Stud.

Indexing
- ISSN: 1062-1237
- LCCN: 94659005
- OCLC no.: 25528895

Links
- Journal homepage; Back issues; Institute for Vaishnava Studies

The Journal of Vaishnava Studies is a biannual academic journal founded in 1992 by Steven J. Rosen (Satyaraja Dasa). It is published by the Institute for Vaishnava Studies and serves as a peer-reviewed forum for research on Vishnu-related traditions. In 2002, the journal affiliated with Christopher Newport University and A. Deepak Publishing. The current editorial team is led by Rosen as editor-in-chief, with Prof. Graham M. Schweig and Prof. Krishna Abhishek Ghosh as senior editors.

Over its more than three decades of publication, the journal has addressed theological, philosophical, and cultural themes in Vaishnavism, often through thematic issues. Its Spring 2012 issue was reviewed in the Journal of Hindu-Christian Studies, where it was described as “a fine volume of interfaith reflection that covers fifteen years of Vaishnava/Christian dialogue, most of which has taken place at an annual conference at Rockwood Manor in Potomac, Maryland.” In 2024, the journal expanded its reach by launching a digital platform, providing online access to its archive and forthcoming issues.

== History ==
The Journal of Vaishnava Studies was founded in 1992 by Steven J. Rosen who is also the editor-in-chief. It is funded by and housed at the Institute of Vaishnava Studies. It is subsidized by The Mira & Ajay Shingal Center for Dharma Studies of the Graduate Theological Union, Berkeley, California.

== Reviews ==
Francis Xavier Clooney has commented positively on the contribution the journal has made to Hindu scholarly publishing.

Edwin Bryant and Maria Ekstrand describe the journal as a "truly nonpartisan enterprise that highlights contemporary research by major scholars not only of the Chaitanya tradition but also of Vaishnavism in general".
