= Krishnaism =

Group of Hindu traditions that reveres Krishna as the Supreme Being

Krishnaism

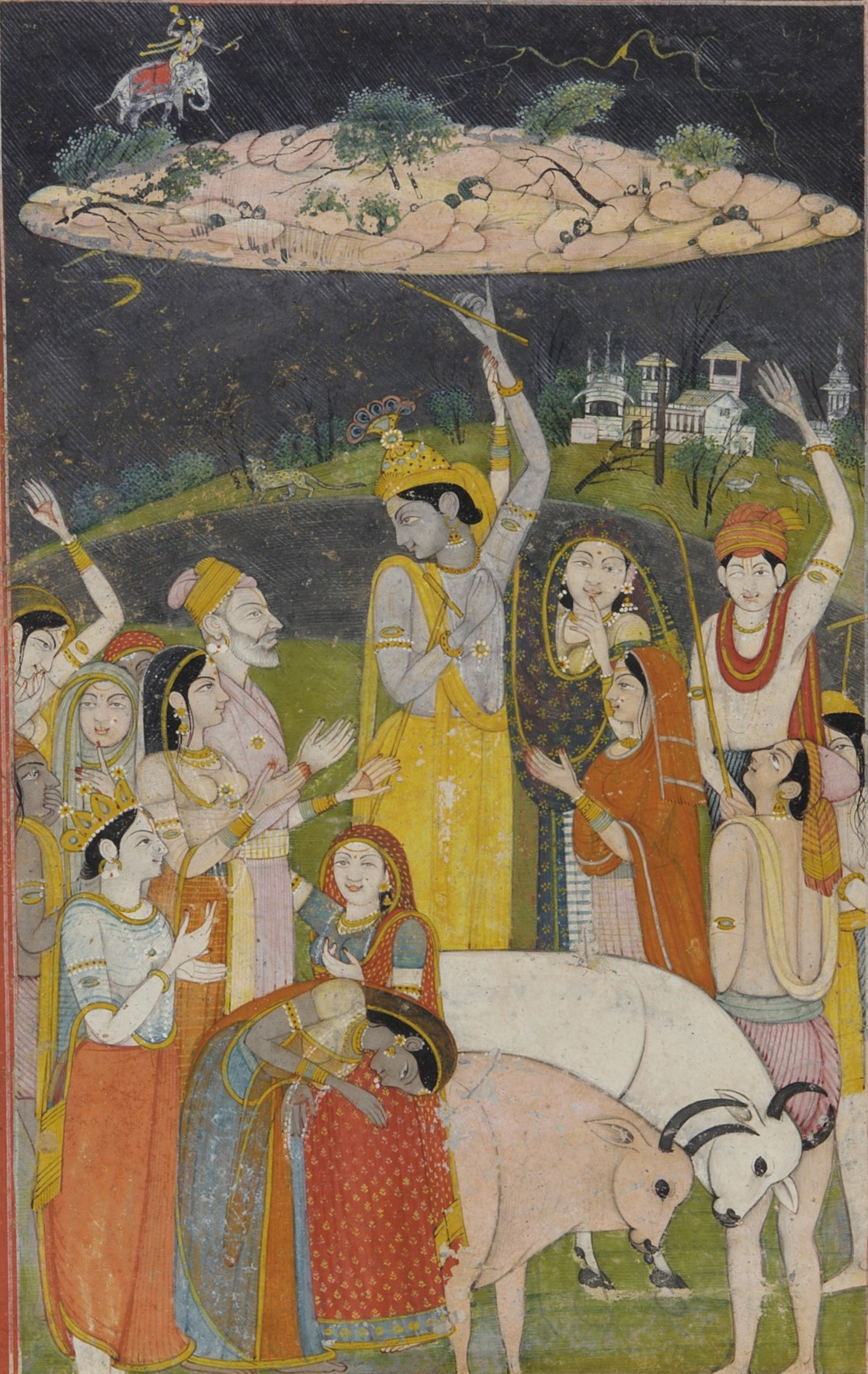
Krishna holding Govardhan hill. From the Smithsonian Institution collections.

Krishnaism is a term used in scholarly circles to describe large group of independent Hindu traditions—sampradayas related to Vaishnavism—that center on the devotion to Krishna as Svayam Bhagavan, Ishvara, Para Brahman, who is the source of all reality, not simply an avatar of Vishnu. (Note: "The term Kṛṣṇaism, then, can be used to summarize a large group of independent systems of beliefs and devotion that developed over more than two thousand years ...") This is its difference from such Vaishnavite groupings as Sri Vaishnavism, Sadh Vaishnavism, Ramaism, Radhaism, and Sitaism. There is also a personal Krishnaism, that is devotion to Krishna outside of any tradition and community, as in the case of the saint-poet Mirabai. Leading scholars do not define Krishnaism as a suborder or offshoot of Vaishnavism, considering it at least a parallel and no less ancient current of Hinduism.

The teachings of the Bhagavad Gita can be considered as the first Krishnaite system of theology. Krishnaism originated in the late centuries BCE from the followers of the heroic Vāsudeva Krishna, which amalgamated several centuries later, in the early centuries CE, with the worshipers of the "divine child" Bala Krishna and the Gopala-Krishna traditions of monotheistic Bhagavatism. These non-Vedic traditions in the Mahabharata canon affiliate themselves with ritualistic Vedism to become acceptable to the orthodox establishment. Krishnaism becomes associated with bhakti movement and bhakti yoga in the Medieval period.

The most remarkable Hindu scriptures for the Krishnaites became Bhagavad Gita, Harivamsa (appendix to the Mahabharata), Brahma samhita, Brahma Vaivarta Purana and Garga Samhita.

== History ==
=== Overview ===
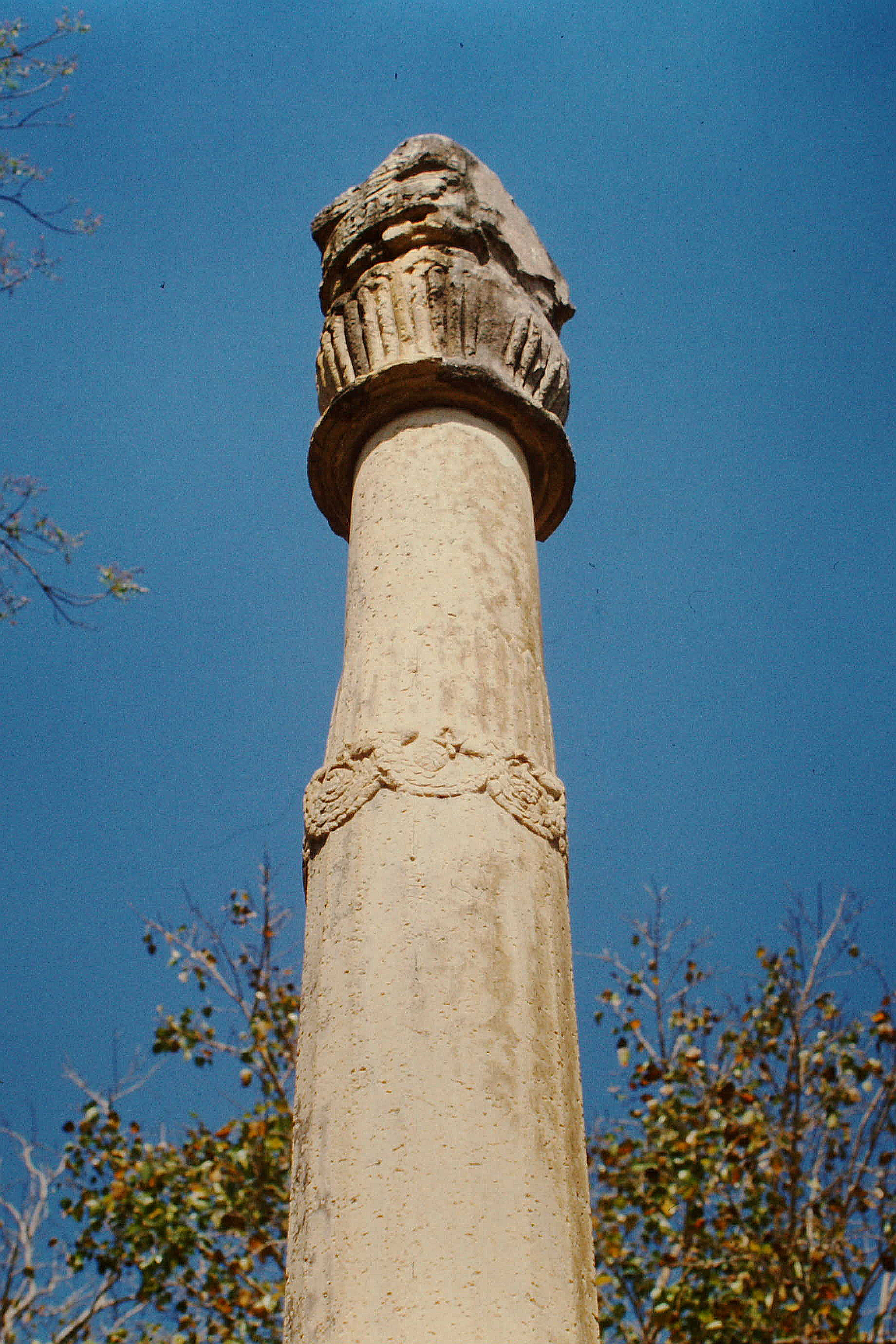
Heliodorus pillar that was made by Heliodorus 110 BCE after his conversion to Bhagavata monotheism.

Krishnaism originates in the first millennium BCE, as the theological system of the Bhagavad Gita, initially focusing on the worship of the heroic Vāsudeva Krishna in the region of Mathura, the "divine child" Bala Krishna and Gopala-Krishna. (Note: "Present day Krishna worship is an amalgam of various elements. According to historical testimonies Krishna-Vāsudeva worship already flourished in and around Mathura several centuries before Christ. A second important element is the cult of Krishna Govinda. Still later is the worship of Bala-Krishna, the Divine Child Krishna — a quite prominent feature of modern Krishnaism. The last element seems to have been Krishna Gopijanavallabha, Krishna the lover of the Gopis, among whom Radha occupies a special position. In some books Krishna is presented as the founder and first teacher of the Bhagavata religion.") It is closely related to, and find its origin in, Bhagavatism.

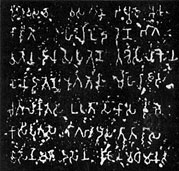
The first inscription of the Heliodorus pillar.

Krishnaism is a non-Vedic tradition in origin, but it further developed its appeal towards orthodox believers through the syncretism of these traditions with the Mahabharata epic. In particular Krishnaism incorporated more or less superficially the Vedic supreme deity Vishnu, who appears in the Rigveda. (Note: "Non-Vedic in origin and development, Kṛṣṇaism now sought affiliation with Vedism so that it could become acceptable to the still not inconsiderable orthodox elements among the people. That is how Viṣṇu of the Ṛgveda came to be assimilated—more or less superficially—into Kṛṣṇaism.") Krishnaism further becomes associated with bhakti yoga in the Medieval period.

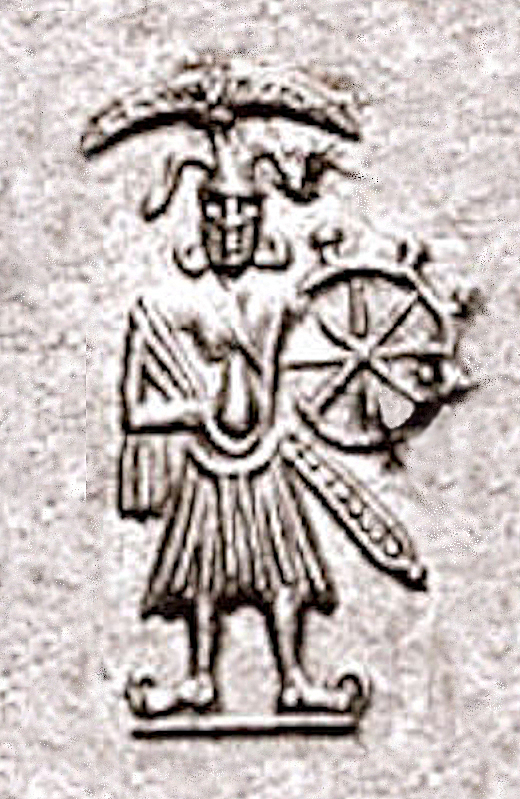
Vāsudeva-Krishna on a coin of Agathocles of Bactria, circa 190–180 BCE. This is "the earliest unambiguous image" of the deity.

=== Ancient traditions. Northern India ===
Krishnaite theology and cult originate in the first millennium BCE in the Northern India. The theology of the Bhagavad Gita (around 3rd–2nd centuries BCE) was the first Krishnaite theological system, if, according to Friedhelm Hardy, to read Gita as itself and not in the light of the Mahabharata frame with Vishnu-focussed doctrine. The fully developed concept of Krishna as an avatara of Vishnu emerged around the 4th or 5th century CE to reconcile earlier Krishna traditions with Vaishnava theology. Earlier texts portray Krishna as divine, but not yet clearly defined as avatara of an unmanifest Vishnu. As Krishna says:

Whenever dharma is suffering a decline, I emit myself [into the physical world]

— Bhagavad Gita 4.7

Early Krishnaism already flourished several centuries BCE with the cult of the heroic Vāsudeva Krishna in and around the region of Mathura, which, several centuries later, was amalgamated with the cult of the "divine child" Bala Krishna and the Gopala traditions. While Vishnu is attested already in the Rigveda as a minor deity, the development of Krishnaism appears to take place via the worship of Vasudeva in the final centuries BCE. But, in accordance with Dandekar, the "Vasudevism" marks the beginning of Vaishnavism in whole. In other words, Krishnaism, according to Dandekar, is not an offshoot of Vaishnavism, but, on the contrary, the cult of Vishnu and his avatars is the later transformation of Krishnaism-Bhagavatism. (Note: "The origin of Vaiṣṇavism as a theistic sect can by no means be traced back to the Ṛgvedic god Viṣṇu. In fact, Vaiṣṇavism is in no sense Vedic in origin. (...) Strangely, the available evidence shows that the worship of Vāsudeva, and not that of Viṣṇu, marks the beginning of what we today understand by Vaiṣṇavism. This Vāsudevism, which represents the earliest known phase of Vaiṣṇavism, must already have become stabilized in the days of Pāṇini (sixth to fifth centuries bce).") This earliest phase was established in the time of Pāṇini (4th century BCE) who, in his Astadhyayi, explained the word vasudevaka as a bhakta (devotee) of Vasudeva. At that time, Vāsudeva was already considered as a demi-God, as he appears in Pāṇini's writings in conjunction with Arjuna as an object of worship, since Pāṇini explains that a vāsudevaka is a devotee (bhakta) of Vāsudeva.

A branch which flourished with the decline of Vedism was centred on Krishna, the deified tribal hero and religious leader of the Yadavas. Worship of Krishna, the deified tribal hero and religious leader of the Yadavas, took denominational form as the Pancaratra and earlier as Bhagavata religions. This tradition has at a later stage merged with the tradition of Narayana.

The character of Gopala Krishna is often considered to be non-Vedic.

By the time of its incorporation into the Mahabharata canon during the early centuries CE, Krishnaism began to affiliate itself with Vedism in order to become acceptable to orthodoxy, in particular aligning itself with Rigvedic Vishnu. At this stage that Vishnu of the Rig Veda was assimilated into Krishnaism and became the equivalent of the Supreme God. The appearance of Krishna as one of the Avatars of Vishnu dates to the period of the Sanskrit epics in the early centuries CE. The Bhagavad Gita was incorporated into the Mahabharata as a key text for Krishnaism.

=== Early medieval traditions. Southern and Eastern India ===
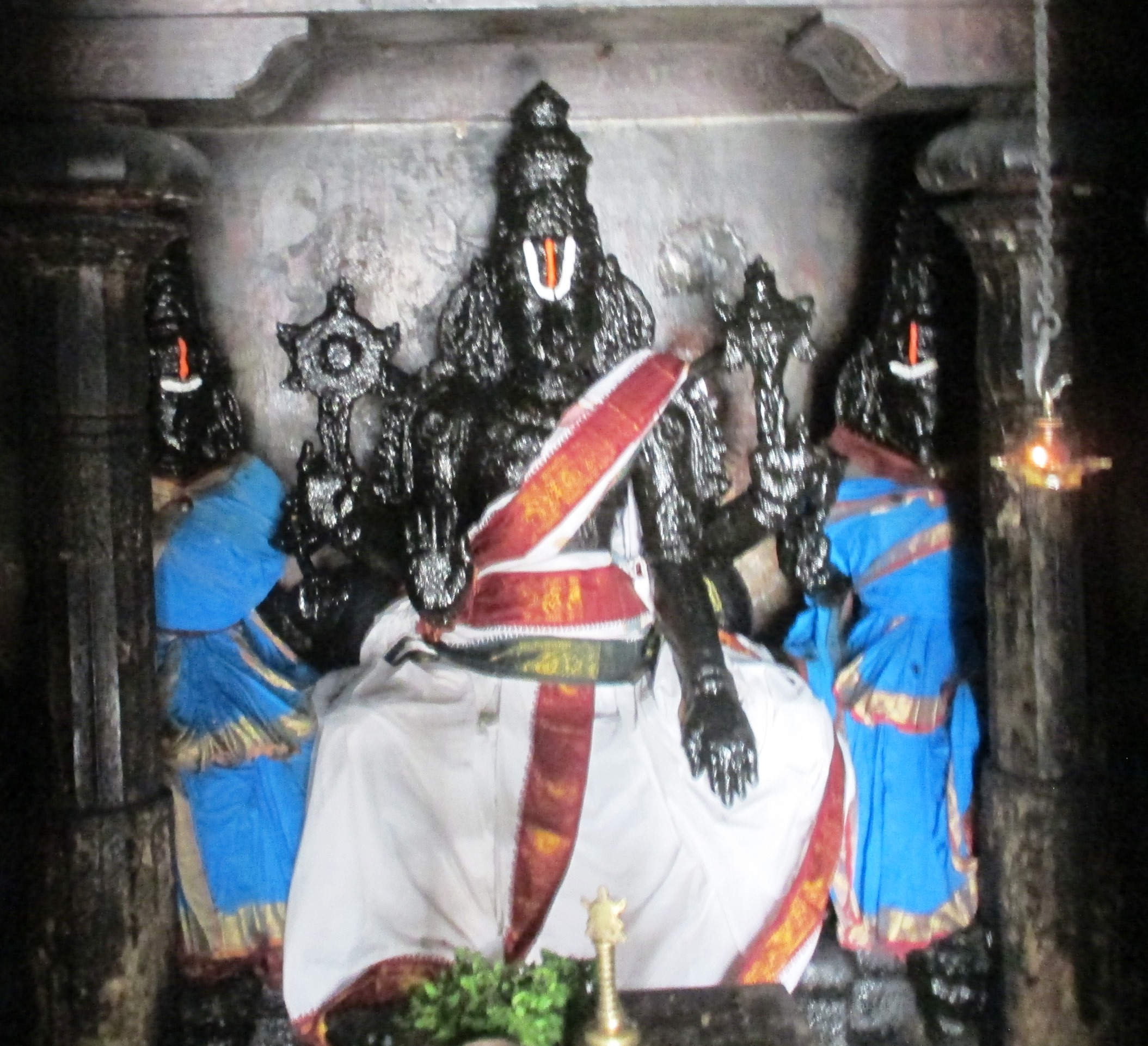
Tirumal's murti in Sundaravarada Perumal temple.

By the Early Middle Ages, Krishnaism had risen to a major current of Vaishnavism.

According to Friedhelm Hardy, (Note: Friedhelm Hardy in his Viraha-bhakti analyses the history of Krishnaism, specifically all pre-11th-century sources starting with the stories of Krishna and the gopi, and Mayon mysticism of the Vaishnava Tamil saints, Sangam Tamil literature and Alvars' Krishna-centered devotion in the rasa of the emotional union and the dating and history of the Bhagavata Purana.) there is evidence of early "southern Krishnaism", despite the tendency to allocate the Krishna-traditions to the Northern traditions. South Indian texts show close parallel with the Sanskrit traditions of Krishna and his gopi companions, so ubiquitous in later North Indian text and imagery. Early writings in Dravidian culture such as Manimekalai and the Cilappatikaram present Krishna, his brother, and favourite female companions in the similar terms. Hardy argues that the Sanskrit Bhagavata Purana is essentially a Sanskrit "translation" of the bhakti of the Tamil alvars.

Devotion to southern Indian Mal (Tirumal) may be an early form of Krishnaism, since Mal appears as a divine figure, largely like Krishna with some elements of Vishnu. The alvars, whose name can be translated "sages" or "saints", were devotees of Mal. Their poems show a pronounced orientation to the Vaishnava, and often Krishna, side of Mal. But they do not make the distinction between Krishna and Vishnu on the basis of the concept of the avatars. Yet, according to Hardy the term "Mayonism" should be used instead of "Krishnaism" when referring to Mal or Mayon.

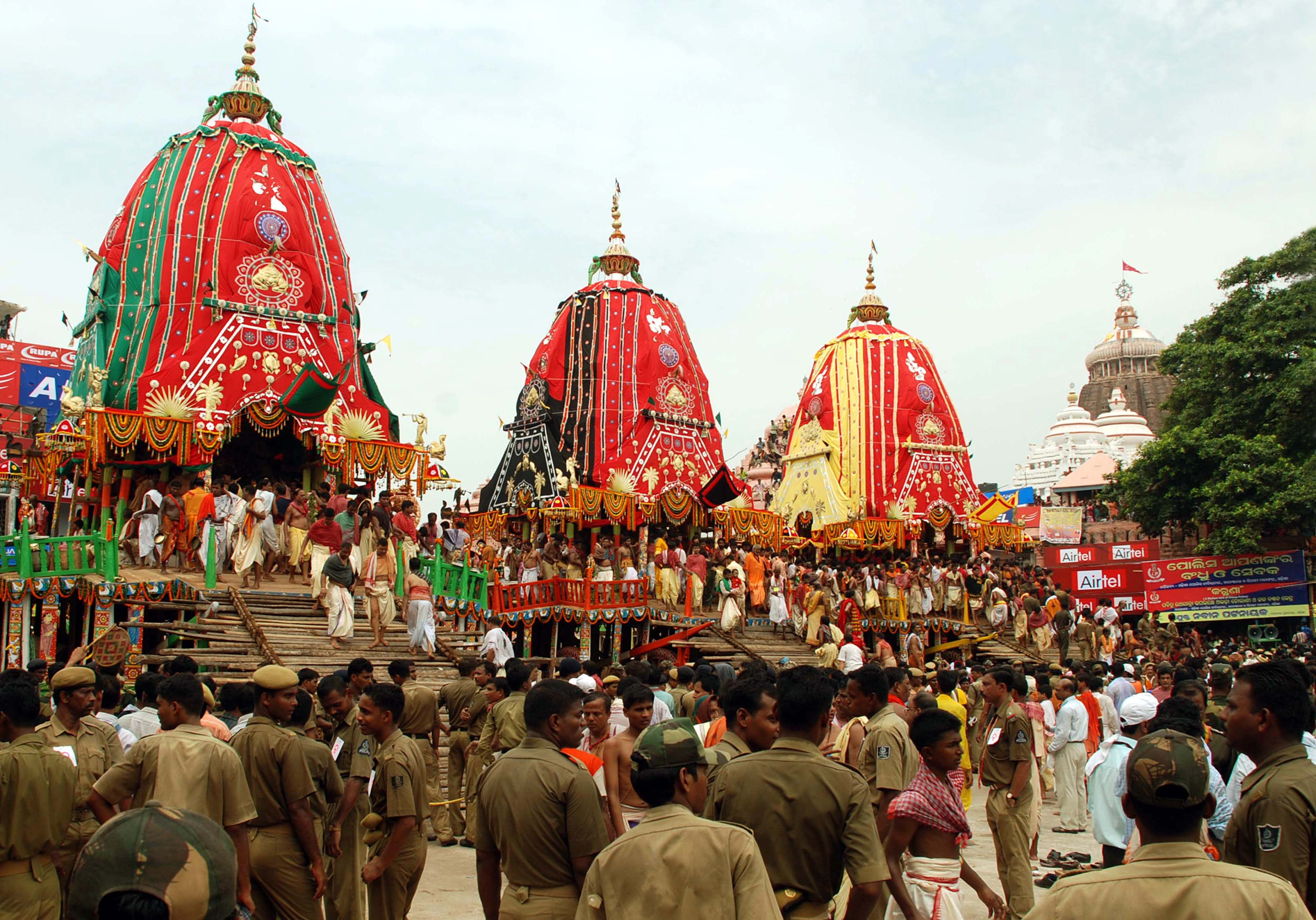
Ratha Yatra (Puri), the Odia chariot festival.

At the same ages, in East India, the Jagannathism (a.k.a. Odia Vaishnavism) was origined as the cult of the god Jagannath (lit. ''Lord of the Universe'')—an abstract form of Krishna. Jagannathism is a regional, previously state, temple-centered version of Krishnaism, where Lord Jagannath is understood as a principal god, Purushottama and Para Brahman, but can also be regarded as a non-sectarian syncretic Vaishnavite and pan-Hindu cult. According to the Vishnudharma Purana (c. 4th century), Krishna is woshipped in the form of Purushottama in Odra (Odisha). The Jagannath temple in Puri, Odisha is particularly significant within the tradition and one of the major pilgrimage destinations for Hindus since about 800 CE, later became a centre of attraction for a number of both Krishnaite and other Vaishnava acharyas, and a place where for the first time the famous poem Gita Govinda was introduced into the liturgy.

Vaishnavism in the 8th century came into contact with the Advaita doctrine of Adi Shankara. Adi Shankara, using the earlier Vishnu Purana as a support, interpreted Vasudeva as the "supreme self" or Vishnu, who dwell everywhere and in all things.

At this period emerged one of key texts for Krishnaites, the Bhagavata Purana, that promotes bhakti (devotion) to Krishna. In it one reads:

Kṛṣņa is Bhagavān himself

— Bhagavata Purana 1.3.28

Another notable bouquet of glory of Krishna was the poems in Sanskrit, possibly by Bilvamangala from Kerala, the Balagopala Stuti ("The Childhood of Krishna") and the Shree Krishna Karnamrutam (also called Lilasuka, "Playful parrot"), that later became a favorite text of the Bengali acharya Chaitanya Mahaprabhu.

=== High and late medieval traditions ===
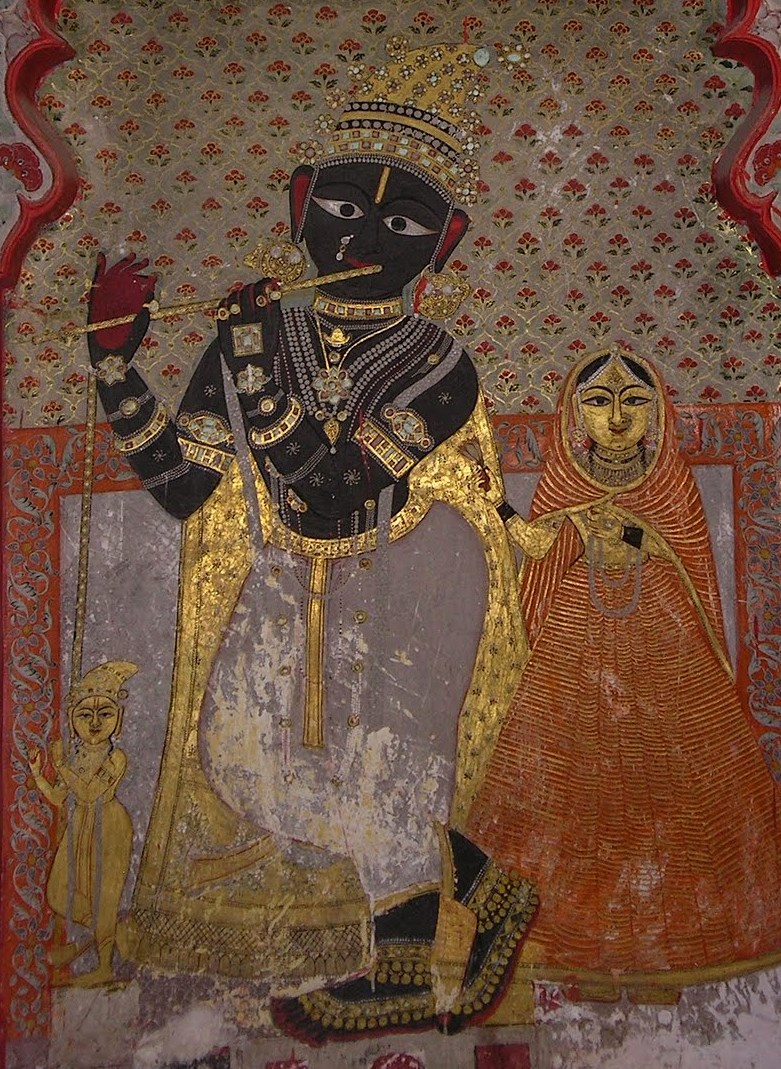
14th-century fresco of Radha Krishna in Udaipur, Rajasthan.

Acharyas

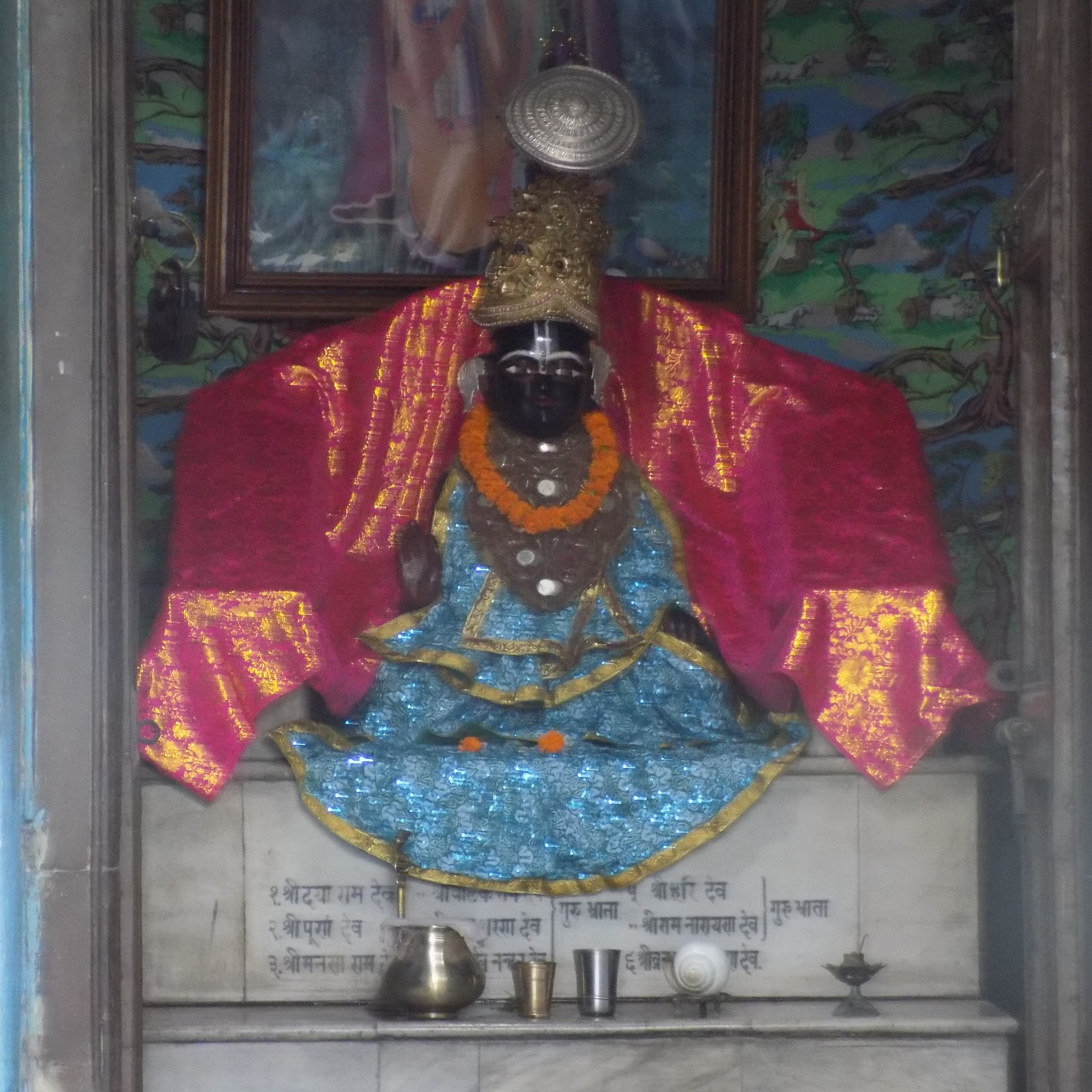
Holy statue of Nimbarkacharya, a founder of the first Bhakti-era Krishnaite sampradaya.

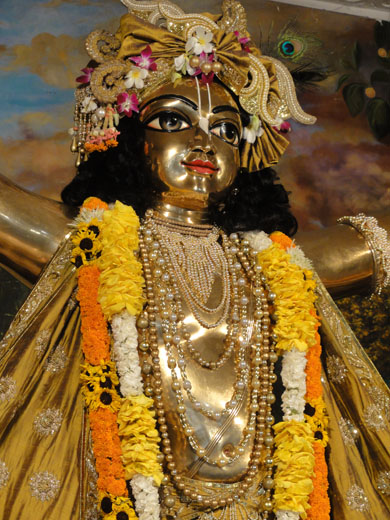
Chaitanya Mahaprabhu, believed to be an expansion of Krishna in the mood of Radha.

This is the most important period, as it was at this time that Krishnaism acquired the form in which its traditions exist today. The bhakti movement of the high and later Middle Ages Hinduism emerges in the 9th or 10th century, and is based (its Krishnaite form) on the Bhagavata Purana, Narada Bhakti Sutra, and other scriptures. In North and East India, Krishnaism gave rise to various Medieval movements. Early Bhakti Krishnaite pioneers include a Telugu-origin philosopher Nimbarkacharya (12th or 13th century CE), the founder of the first Bhakti-era Krishnaite Nimbarka Sampradaya (a.k.a. Kumara sampradaya), and his an Odisha-born friend, poet Jayadeva, author of Gita Govinda. Both promoted Radha Krishna to be the supreme lord while the ten incarnations are his forms. Nimbarka more than any other acharyas, gave Radha a place as a deity.

Since 15th century in Bengal and Assam flourished Tantric variety of Krishnaism—Vaishnava-Sahajiya linked to the Bengali poet Chandidas, as well as related to it Bauls—where Krishna is the inner divine aspect of man and Radha is the aspect of woman. Chandidas' Shrikrishna Kirtana, a poem on Krishna and Radha, depicts them as divine couple, but in human love.

The other 15th–16th centuries Bhakti poet-sants – Vidyapati, Meera Bai, Surdas, Swami Haridas, as well as Narsinh Mehta (1350–1450), who preceded all of them, also wrote about Radha and Krishna love.

The most emerged Krishnaite guru-acharyas of 15th–16th centuries were Vallabhacharya in Braj, Sankardev in Assam, and Chaitanya Mahaprabhu in Bengal. They developed their own schools, namely Pushtimarg sampradaya of Vallabha, Gaudiya Vaishnavism, a.k.a. Chaitanya Sampradaya (rather, Chaitanya was an inspirator with no formal successors), with Krishna and his chief consort and shakti Radha as the supreme god, and Ekasarana Dharma tradition of Sankardev who worship only Krishna, that started under the influence of the Odia cult of Jagannath.

In the Western Indian state of Maharashtra, saint poets of the Warkari tradition such as Dnyaneshwar, Namdev, Janabai, Eknath, and Tukaram promoted the worship of Vithoba, a local form of Krishna, from the late of the 13th century until the late 18th century. Before the Warkari sampradaya, Krishna devotion (Pancha-Krishna, i.e. five Krishnas) became well established in Maharashtra due to the rise of Mahanubhava Panth founded by the 13th-century Gujarati acharya Chakradhara. Both schools, Warkari and Mahanubhava, venerated Krishna and his wife Rukmini (Rakhumai).

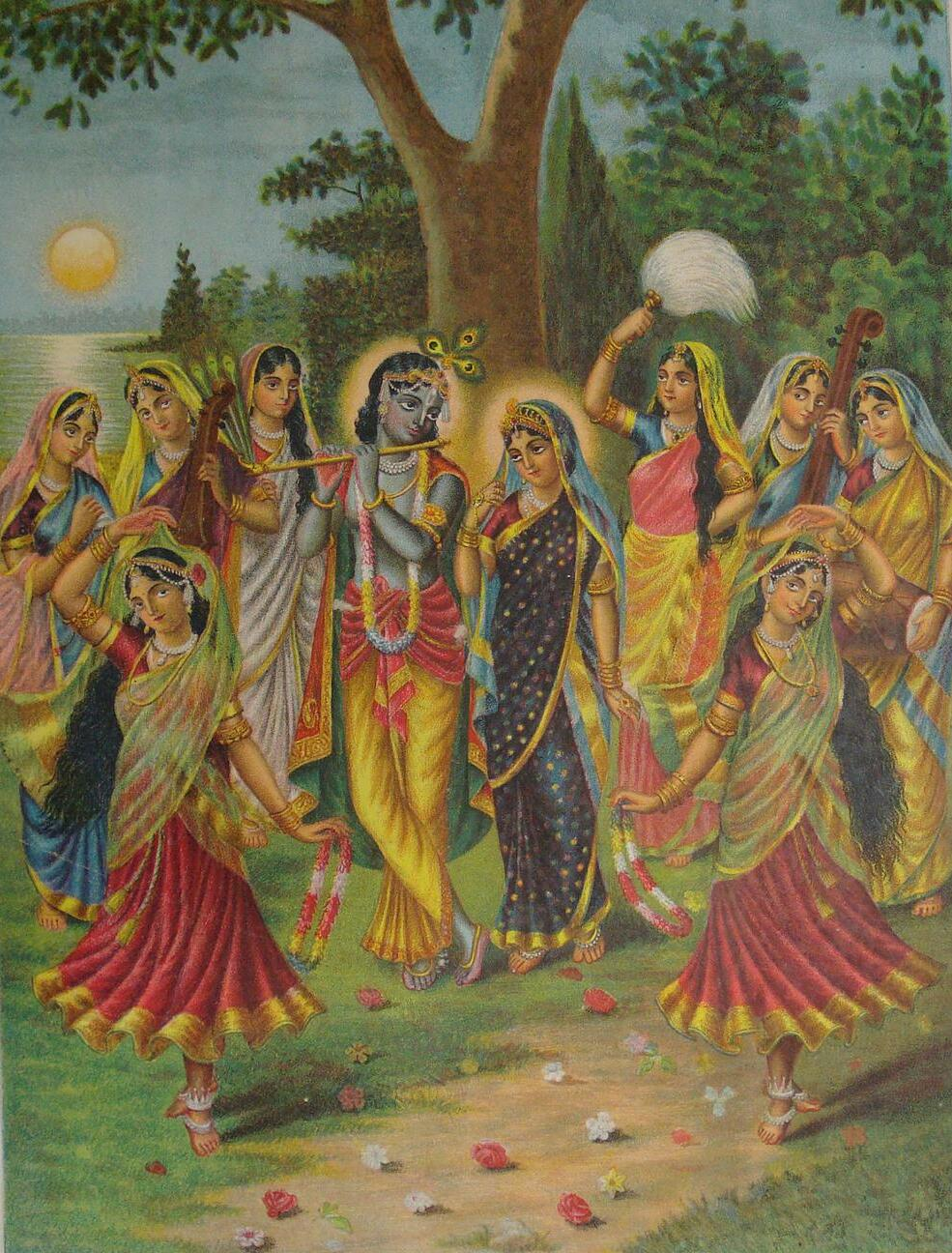
Radha Krishna with Ashtasakhi

In 16th century in Mathura region, offshoot of Krishnaism is established as Radha Vallabha Sampradaya by the Braj-language poet-sant Hith Harivansh Mahaprabhu and who emphasized devotion to Radha as the ultimate supreme deity.

== Modern times ==
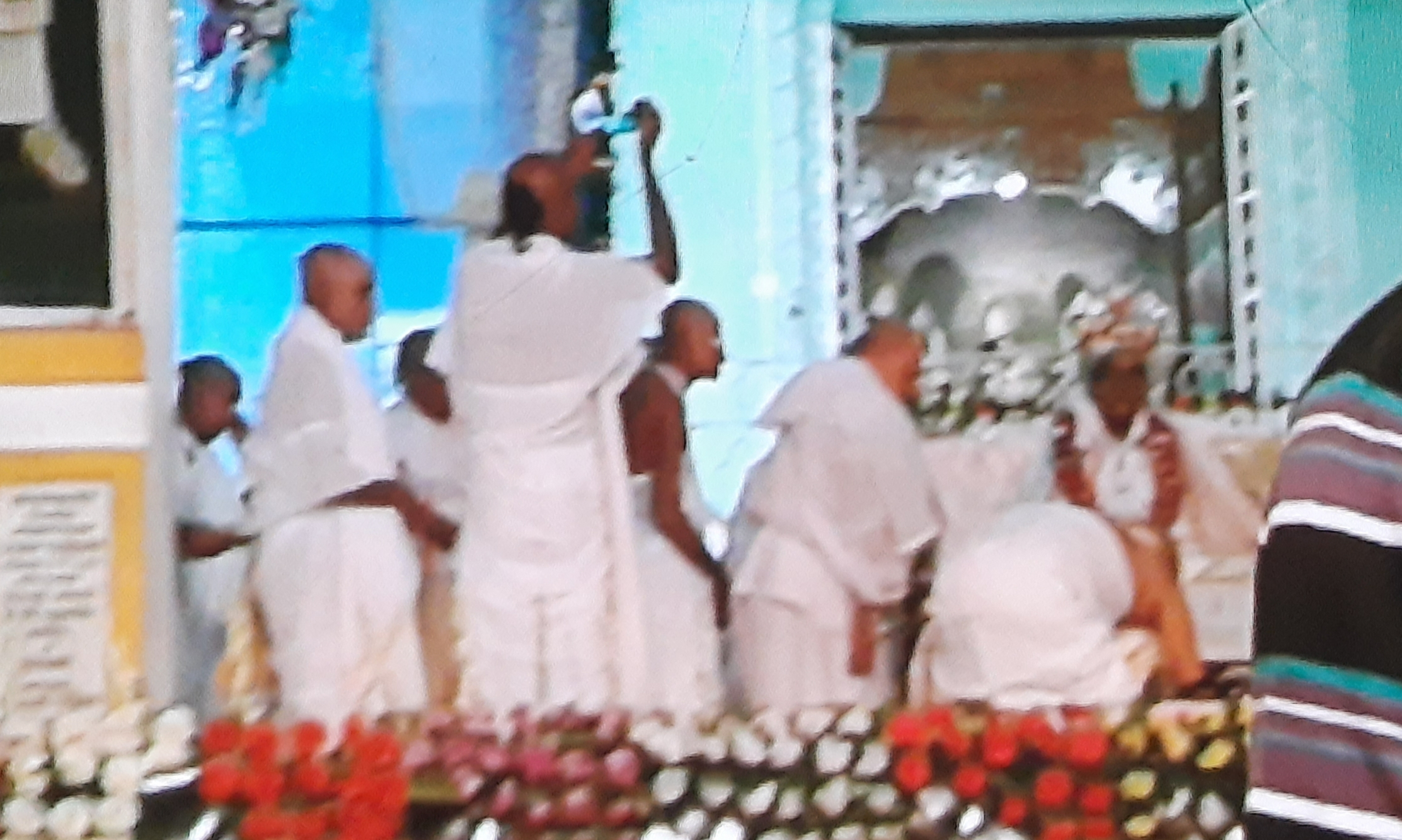
Mahanam Sampradaya's worship, Kolkata.

The Pranami Sampradaya (Pranami Panth) emerged in the 17th century in Gujarat, based on the Krishna-focussed syncretist Hindu-Islamic teachings of a Sindh-born Devchandra Maharaj (1581–1655) and his famous successor, Mahamati Prannath (1618–1694).

During the 18th century in Kolkata, there existed the Sakhībhāvakas community, whose members wore female dress in order to identify themselves with the gopis, companions of Radha.

In non-Indo-Aryan Manipur region, after a short period of Ramaism penetration, Gaudiya Vaishnavism spread, especially from the beginning of the second quarter of the 18th century (Manipuri Vaishnavism, the lineage of Natottama Thakura).

In the 1890s in Bengal, Mahanam Sampradaya emerged as an offshoot of Gaudiya Vaishnavism. Prabhu Jagadbandhu was considered a new incarnation of Krishna, Chaitanya Mahaprabhu and Nityananda by his followers.

At the beginning of the 20th century the first attempts at establishing a Krishnaite mission in the West began. A pioneer of American mission was Baba Premananda Bharati (1858–1914) from the circle of Prabhu Jagadbandhu. Baba Bharati founded the short-lived "Krishna Samaj" society in New York City in 1902 and built a temple in Los Angeles. He was an author of the first full-length treatment of Gaudiya Vaishnavism in English, Sree Krishna—the Lord of Love (New York, 1904); The author sent the book to Russian writer Leo Tolstoy, who was intrigued and used the text for composition his notable A Letter to a Hindu. Baba Bharati's followers later formed several organisations in US, including now the now-defunct Order of Living Service and the AUM Temple of Universal Truth.

Within Gaudiya Vaishnavism, the Gaudiya Math was established in the 20th century, along with its largest successor, the International Society for Krishna Consciousness (a.k.a. Hare Krishna Movement), founded in New York by A. C. Bhaktivedanta Swami Prabhupada.

There are a number of neo-Hindu Krishnaite organisations that are only partially related to traditional sampradayas, such as Jagadguru Kripalu Parishat, Jagadguru Kripaluji Yog, and Science of Identity Foundation.

Krishnaite authors continue to create major theological and poetic works. For instance, the Shri Radhacharita Mahakavyam—the 1980s epic poem of Kalika Prasad Shukla, which focuses on devotion to Krishna as the universal lover is—"one of the rare, high-quality works in Sanskrit in the twentieth century."

== List of living Krishnaite traditions ==
Krishnaite traditions are mainly subdivided into three categories:

Radha Krishna as the Supreme

- Pushtimarg
- Gaudiya Vaishnavism
- Mahanam Sampradaya
- Nimbarka Sampradaya
- Pranami Sampradaya
- Radha Vallabh Sampradaya (Note: "Radha Vallabh Sampradaya is conditionally Krishnaite, representing such current as Radhaism, due to the worship of Radha as the supreme deity, where Krishna is only her most intimate servant.)
- Vaishnava-Sahajiya

Krishna with Rukmini as the Supreme

- Warkari

Krishna as the Supreme

- Mahanubhava
- Ekasarana Dharma
- Jagannathism

== Beliefs ==
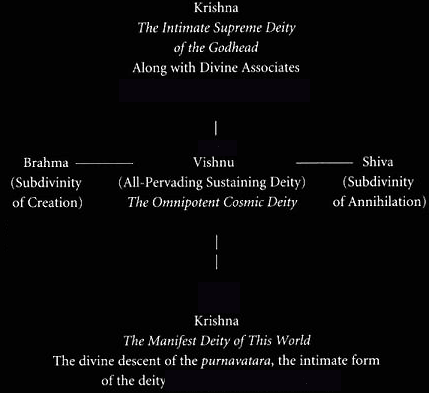
Relationship between different forms of Krishna as paripurna avatara of Vishnu and as Svayam Bhagavan.

=== Krishnaism and Vaishnavism ===
The term "Krishnaism" has been used to describe the schools, related to Vaishnavism, but focused on Krishna, while "Vishnuism/Vaishnavism" may be used for traditions focusing on Vishnu in which Krishna is an avatar, rather than a transcended Supreme Being. At the same time, Friedhelm Hardy does not at all define Krishnaism as a suborder or offshoot of Vaishnavism, considering it at least a parallel and no less ancient current of Hinduism. And, in accordance with Dandekar, the "Vasudevism" (the Vasudeva cult) is the beginning stage of Vaishnavism, hence, Krishnaism was basis for later Vaishnavism. (Note: "The origin of Vaiṣṇavism as a theistic sect can by no means be traced back to the Ṛgvedic god Viṣṇu. In fact, Vaiṣṇavism is in no sense Vedic in origin. (...) Strangely, the available evidence shows that the worship of Vāsudeva, and not that of Viṣṇu, marks the beginning of what we today understand by Vaiṣṇavism. This Vāsudevism, which represents the earliest known phase of Vaiṣṇavism, must already have become stabilized in the days of Pāṇini (sixth to fifth centuries bce).") Vishnuism believes in Vishnu as the supreme being, manifested himself as Krishna, thence Krishnaites assert Krishna to be Svayam Bhagavan (lit. 'Sanskrit: 'The Fortunate and Blessed One Himself'), Ishvara, the Para Brahman in human form, (Note: "(...) After attaining to fame eternal, he again took up his real nature as Brahman. The most important among Visnu's avataras is undoubtedly Krsna, the black one, also called Syama. For his worshippers he is not an avatara in the usual sense, but Svayam Bhagavan, the Lord himself.") (Note: "On the touch-stone of this definition of the final and positive characteristic of Sri Krsna as the Highest Divinity as Svayam-rupa Bhagavan.") (Note: "The Bengal School identifies the Bhagavat with Krishna depicted in the Shrimad-Bhagavata and presents him as its highest personal God.") that manifested himself as Vishnu. As such Krishnaism is believed to be one of the early attempts to make philosophical Hinduism appealing to the masses. In common language the term Krishnaism is not often used, as many prefer a wider term "Vaishnavism", which appeared to relate to Vishnu, more specifically as Vishnu-ism. In outdated literature, there is a broad understanding of Krishnaism as any cult of Krishna, including as a subordinate avatar. Thus, Krishnaism was subdivided into three categories: (1) exclusive worship of Krishna as supreme god or as incarnation of Vishnu; (2) exclusive worship of Radha as original shakti of Krishna or Vishnu; and (3) worship of Radha Krishna conjointly.

Krishnaism is often also called Bhagavatism, after the Bhagavata Purana which asserts that Krishna is "Bhagavan Himself", and subordinates to itself all other forms: Vishnu, Narayana, Purusha, Ishvara, Hari, Vāsudeva, Janardana, and so on. (Note: "It becomes clear that the personality of Bhagvan Krishna subordinates to itself the titles and identities of Vishnu, Narayana, Purusha, Ishvara, Hari, Vasudeva, Janardana etc. The pervasive theme, then, of the Bhagavata Puran is the identification of Bhagavan with Krishna.")

=== Krishna ===
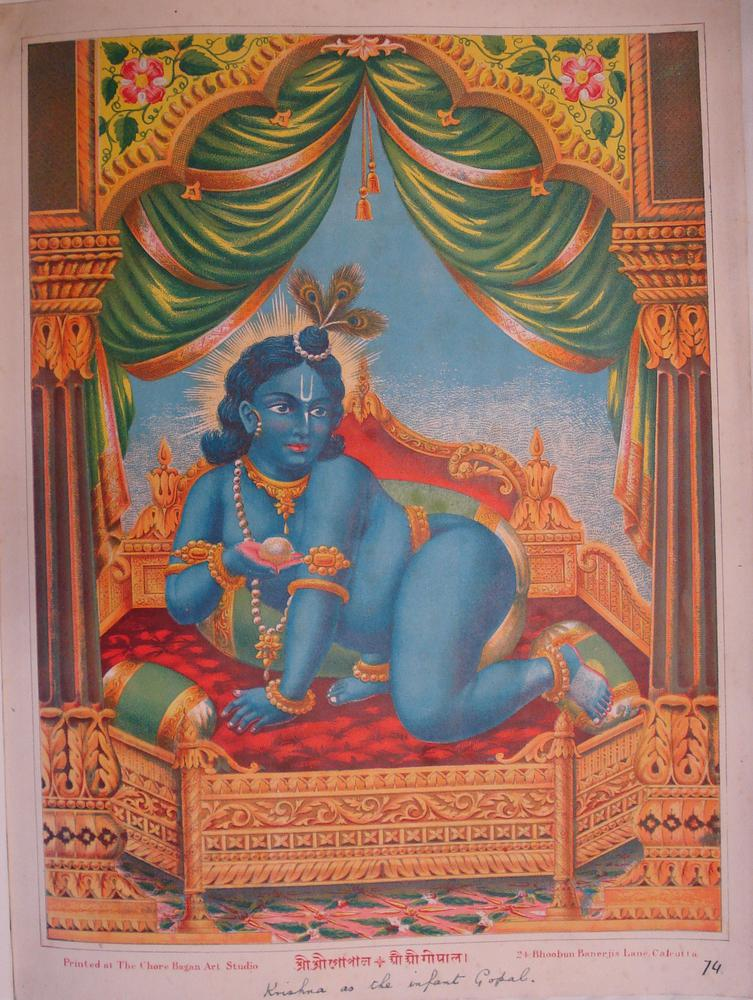
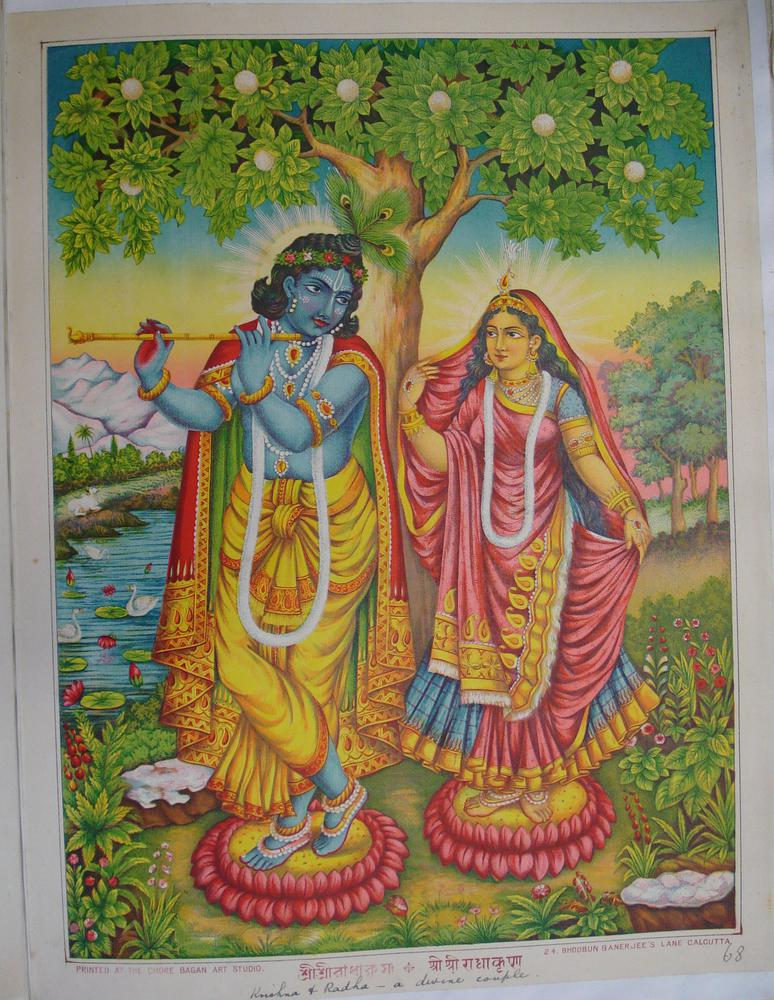
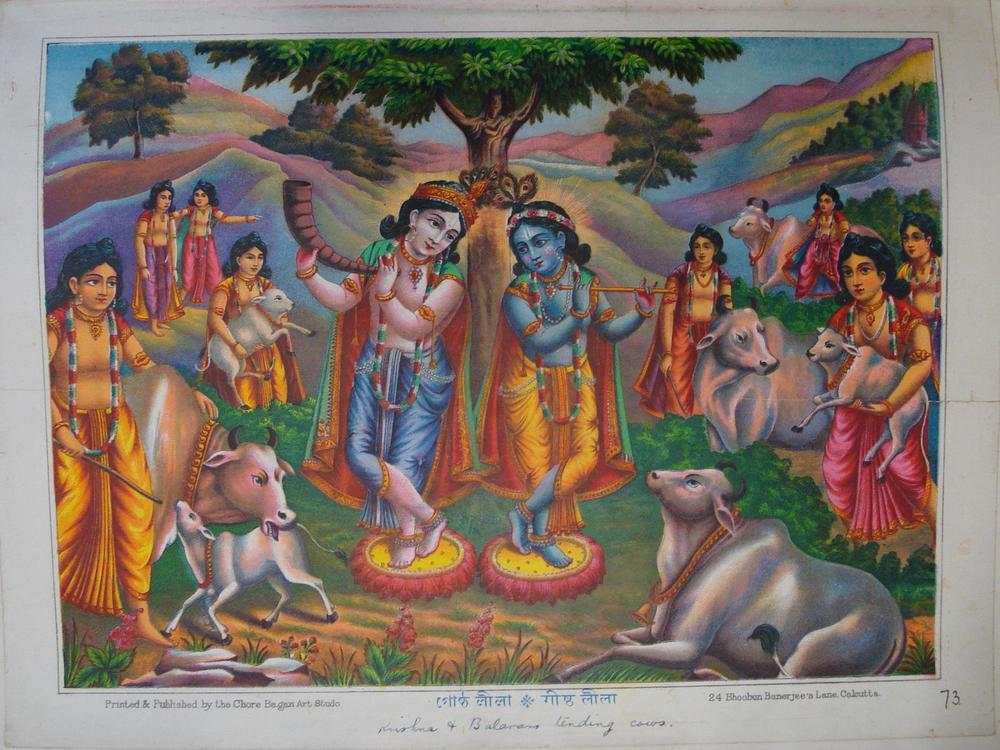
Various forms of Krishna depicted in lithographs printed in 1895 from Chorebagan Art Studio, Calcutta. These are Balakrishna (top), Radha-Krishna (middle) & Gopala-Krishna (bottom)

Vaishnavism is a monotheistic religion, centered on the devotion of Vishnu and his avatars. It is sometimes described as a "polymorphic monotheism", since there are many forms of one original deity, with Vishnu taking many forms. In Krishnaism this deity is Krishna—often together with his consort Radha as deity Radha Krishna—sometimes referred as intimate deity — as compared with the numerous four-armed forms of Narayana or Vishnu.

Krishna is also worshiped across many other traditions of Hinduism. Krishna is often described as having the appearance of a dark-skinned person and is depicted as a young cowherd boy playing a flute or as a youthful prince giving philosophical direction and guidance, as in the Bhagavad Gita.

Krishna and the stories associated with him appear across a broad spectrum of different Hindu philosophical and theological traditions, where it is believed that God appears to his devoted worshippers in many different forms, depending on their particular desires. These forms include the different avataras of Krishna described in traditional Vaishnavite texts, but they are not limited to these. Indeed, it is said that the different expansions of the Svayam bhagavan are uncountable and they cannot be fully described in the finite scriptures of any one religious community. Many of the Hindu scriptures sometimes differ in details reflecting the concerns of a particular tradition, while some core features of the view on Krishna are shared by all.

== Common scriptures ==
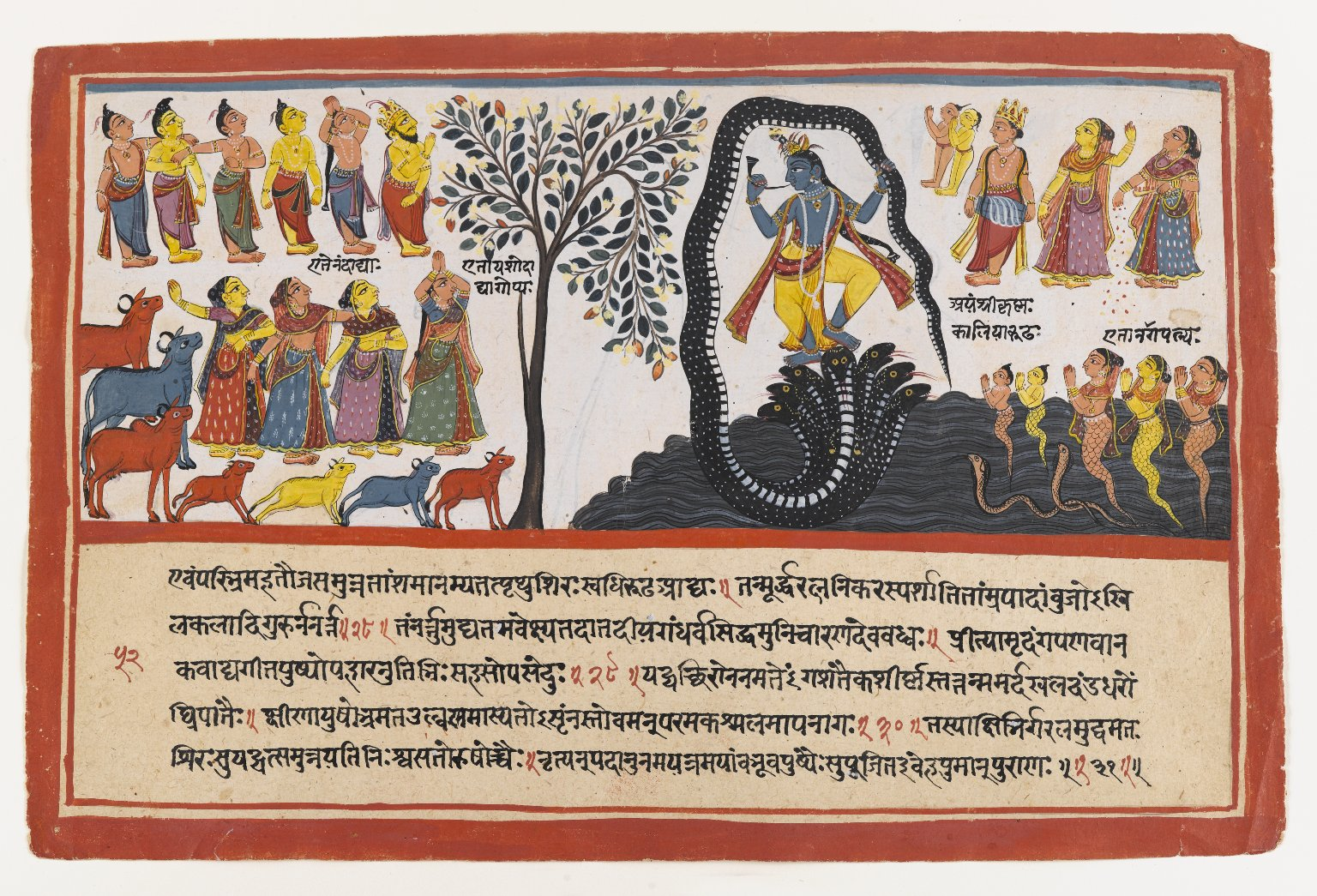
A page of Bhagavata Purana manuscript.

The most remarkable Hindu scriptures for the Krishnaites became Bhagavad Gita, Harivamsa (appendix to the Mahabharata), and Bhagavata Purana (especially the 10th Canto). While every tradition of Krishnaism has its own canon, in all Krishna is accepted as a teacher of the path in the scriptures Bhagavad Gita and the Bhagavata Purana—"the Bible of Krishnaism". (Note: "..Bhagavad Gita and the Bhagavata Purana, certainly the most popular religious books in the whole of India. Not only was Krsnaism influenced by the identification of Krsna with Vishnu, but also Vaishnavism as a whole was partly transformed and reinvented in the light of the popular and powerful Krishna religion. Bhagavatism may have brought an element of cosmic religion into Krishna worship; Krishna has certainly brought a strongly human element into Bhagavatism. ... The center of Krishna-worship has been for a long time Brajbhumi, the district of Mathura that embraces also Vrindavana, Govardhana, and Gokula, associated with Krishna from the time immemorial. Many millions of Krishna bhaktas visit these places ever year and participate in the numerous festivals that reenact scenes from Krshnas life on Earth.")

As Krishna says in the Bhagavad Gita, establishing the basis of Krishnaism himself:

- "And of all yogins, he who full of faith worships Me, with his inner self abiding in Me, him, I hold to be the most attuned (to me in Yoga)."
- "After attaining Me, the great souls do not incur rebirth in this miserable transitory world, because they have attained the highest perfection."

In Gaudiya Vaishnava, Vallabha Sampradaya, Nimbarka sampradaya and the old Bhagavat school, Krishna is believed to be fully represented in his original form in the Bhagavata Purana, that at the end of the list of avataras concludes with the following assertion:

All of the above-mentioned incarnations are either plenary portions or portions of the plenary portions of the Lord, but Sri Krishna is the original Personality of Godhead (Svayam Bhagavan).

Not all commentators on the Bhagavata Purana stress this verse, however a majority of Krishna-centered and contemporary commentaries highlight this verse as a significant statement. Jiva Goswami has called it Paribhasa-sutra, the "thesis statement" upon which the entire book or even theology is based.

In another place of the Bhagavata Purana (10.83.5–43) those who are named as wives of Krishna all explain to Uraupadi how the 'Lord himself' (Svayam Bhagavan, Bhagavata Purana 10.83.7) came to marry them. As they relate these episodes, several of the wives speak of themselves as Krishna's devotees. In the tenth canto the Bhagavata Purana describes svayam bhagavans Krishna's childhood pastimes as that of a much-loved child raised by cowherds in Vrindavan, near to the Yamuna River. The young Krishna enjoys numerous pleasures, such as thieving balls of butter or playing in the forest with his cowherd friends. He also endures episodes of carefree bravery protecting the town from demons. More importantly, however, he steals the hearts of the cowherd girls (Gopis). Through his magical ways, he multiplies himself to give each the attention needed to allow her to be so much in love with Krishna that she feels at one with him and only desires to serve him. This love, represented by the grief they feel when Krishna is called away on a heroic mission and their intense longing for him, is presented as models of the way of extreme devotion (bhakti) to the Supreme Lord.

Edwin F. Bryant describes the synthesis of ideas in Bhagavata Purana 10th Book as:

The tenth book promotes Krishna as the highest absolute personal aspect of godhead — the personality behind the term Ishvara and the ultimate aspect of Brahman.

Other common scriptures

- Brahma Vaivarta Purana is one of major Puranas, that centers around Krishna and Radha, identifying Krishna as the Supreme Being and asserting that all deities such as Vishnu, Shiva, Brahma, Ganesha are incarnations of Him;
- Gita Govinda is a poem of Jayadeva that firstly considers the cult Radha Krishna, where Krishna speaks to Radha:

O woman with desire, place on this patch of flower-strewn floor your lotus foot,
And let your foot through beauty win,
To me who am the Lord of All, O be attached, now always yours.
O follow me, my little Radha.

— Jayadeva, Gita Govinda

- Narayaniyam is Melpathur Narayana Bhattathiri's poem as a summary of the Bhagavata Purana.
- Padma Purana deals a big part with Krishnaism, which is mostly the same as the theme of Brahma Vaivarta Purana, mainly Krishna's greatness begins at the later half of the fifth Canto.
- Garga Samhita is a detailed Vaishnavite scripture written by sage Garga on the life events of Radha Krishna. It is the earliest text available which associates the festival of Holi with them.

== Philosophy and theology ==
Jiva Gosvami's Bhajan Kutir at Radha-kunda. Jiva Goswamis Sandarbhas summarize Vedic sources of Gaudiya Vaishnava tradition's accretion of the concept Krishna to be the supreme Lord, based on paribhasa-sutra of Bhagavata Purana.

A wide range of theological and philosophical ideas are presented through Krishna in Krishnaite texts. The teachings of the Bhagavad Gita can be considered as the first Krishnaite system of theology in terms of Bhakti yoga.

The Bhagavata Purana synthesizes an Vedanta, Samkhya, and devotionalized Yoga praxis framework for Krishna but one that proceeds through loving devotion to Krishna.

Bhedabheda became a main kind of Krishnaite philosophy, which teaches that the individual self is both different and not different from the ultimate reality. It predates the positions of nondualism (namely Vishishtadvaita of Ramanuja) and dualism (Dvaita of Madhvacharya). Among medieval Bhedabheda thinkers are Nimbarkacharya, who founded the Dvaitadvaita school), as well as Jiva Goswami, a saint from Gaudiya Vaishnavism, described Krishna theology in terms of Achintya Bheda Abheda philosophical school.

Krishna theology is presented in a pure monism (Advaita Vedanta framework by Vallabhacharya, who was the founder of Shuddhadvaita school of philosophy.

The acharya-founders of the remaining Krishnaite sampradayas did not create new schools of philosophy, following the old ones or nor attaching importance to philosophical speculations. Thus, the philosophical base of the Warkari and Mahanubhava traditions is the Dvaitin, and Ekasarana Dharma is the Advaitin. And the Radha-vallabha Sampradaya prefers to remain unaffiliation with any philosophical positions and declines to produce theological and philosophical commentaries, basing on pure bhakti, divine love.

== Practices ==
Radha Krishna devotion

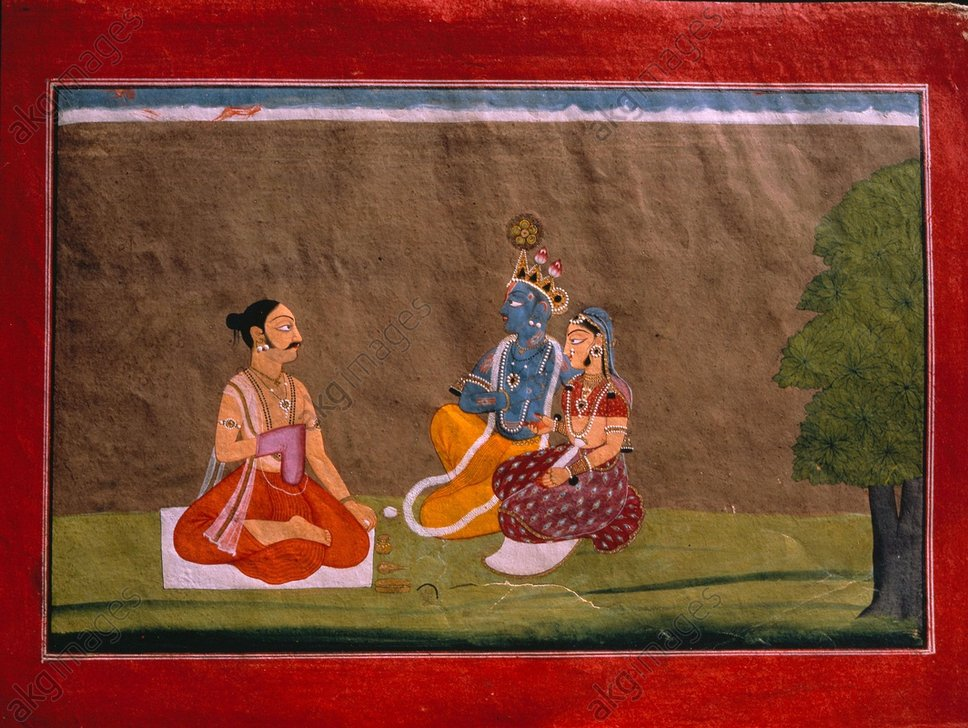
Jayadeva recites the mantra to Radha Krishna by Manaku.

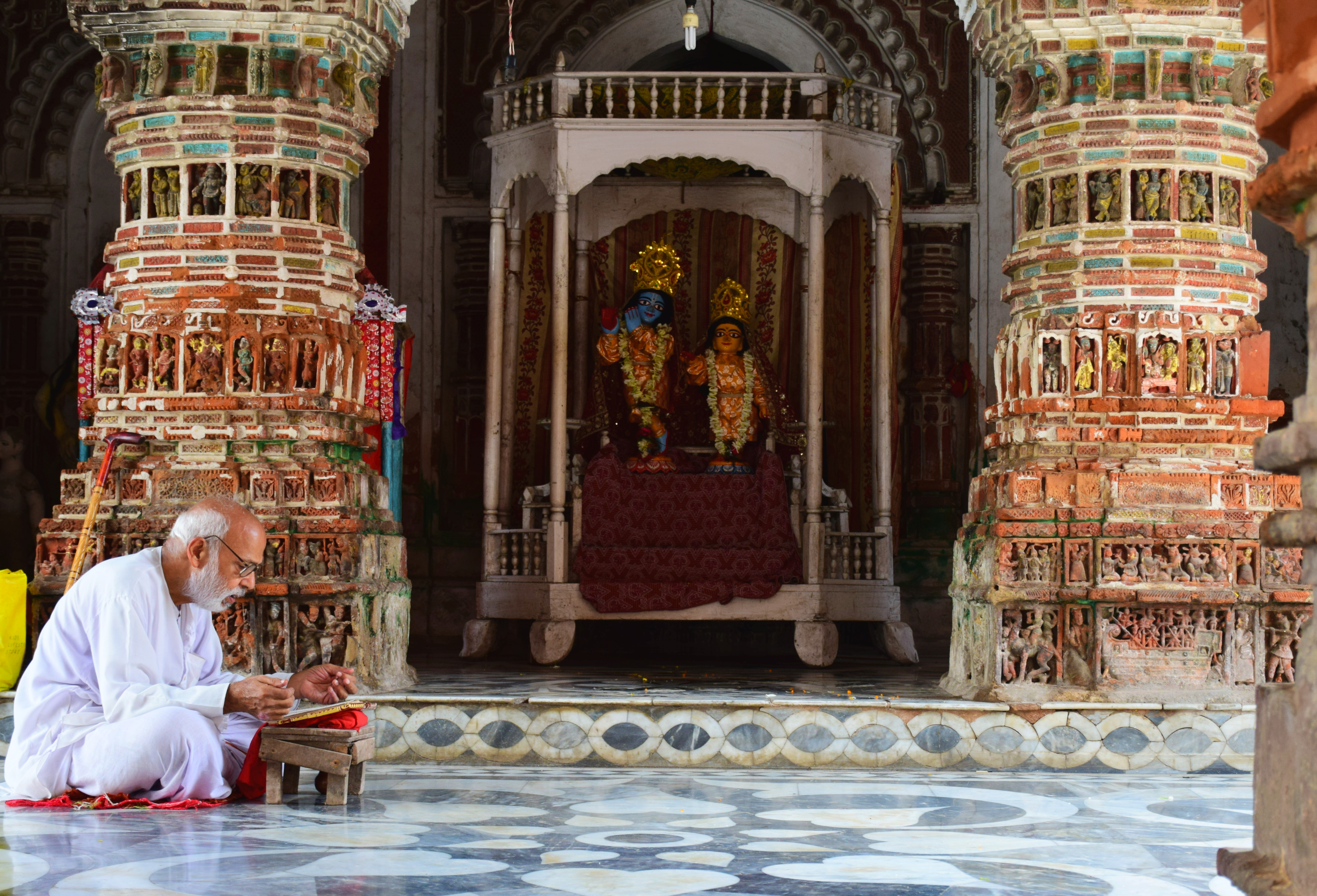
A devotee reading inside didicated to Radha-Krishna 18th-century Lalji Temple, Kalna.

=== Maha-mantra ===
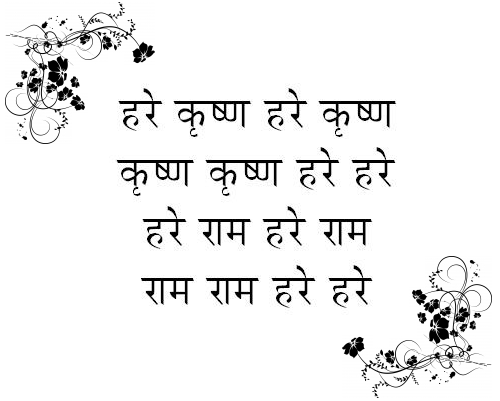
Maha-mantra Hare Krishna in Devanagari script.

A mantra is a sacred utterance. The most basic and known it among the Krishnaites—Mahā-mantra ("Great Mantra")—is a 16-word mantra in Sanskrit which is mentioned in the Kali-Saṇṭāraṇa Upaniṣad:

Hare Rāma Hare Rāma
Rāma Rāma Hare Hare
Hare Kṛṣṇa Hare Kṛṣṇa
Kṛṣṇa Kṛṣṇa Hare Hare

— Kali-Saṇṭāraṇa Upaniṣad

Its variety within Gaudiya Vaishnavism looks as:

Hare Kṛṣṇa Hare Kṛṣṇa
Kṛṣṇa Kṛṣṇa Hare Hare
Hare Rāma Hare Rāma
Rāma Rāma Hare Hare

The Maha-mantra Radhe Krishna of Nimbarka Sampradaya is as follows:

Rādhe Kṛṣṇa Rādhe Kṛṣṇa
Kṛṣṇa Kṛṣṇa Rādhe Rādhe
Rādhe Shyām Rādhe Shyām
Shyām Shyām Rādhe Rādhe

=== Kirtan ===
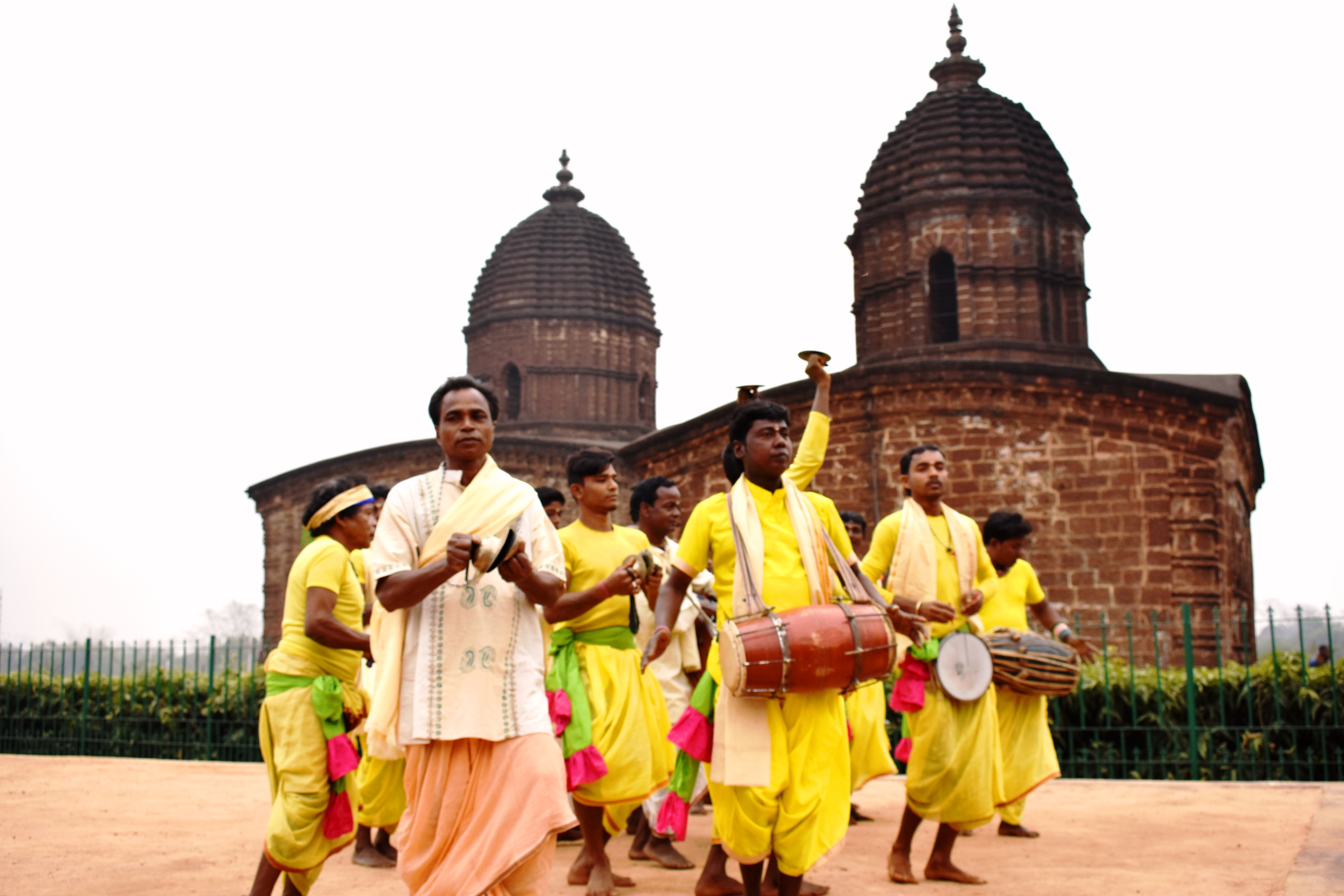
Kirtan at front of the Jor Mandir Temple in Bishnupur.

A characteristic part of spiritual practice, in almost all traditions of Krishnaism, is a kirtan, a collective musical performance with chanting of the glories of God.

The Marathi Varkari saint Namdev used the kirtan form of singing to praise the glory of Vithoba (Krishna). Marathi kirtan is typically performed by one or two main performers, called "kirtankar", accompanied by harmonium and tabla. It involves singing, acting, dancing, and story-telling. The naradiya kirtan popular in Maharashtra is performed by a single kirtankar, and contains the poetry of saints of Maharashtra such as Dnyaneshwar, Eknath, Namdev and Tukaram.

In Vrindavan of Braj region, a kirtan accords the Hindustani classical music. Vallabha launched a kirtan singing devotional movement around the stories of baby Krishna and his early childhood. And "Samaj-Gayan" is the Radha-vallabha Sampradaya's collective style of hymn singing by the Hindustani classical forms "dhrupad" and "dhamar".

Within the Pushtimarg tradition, kirtan is practiced as Haveli Sangeet, a liturgical art form formalized by the Ashtachap (Eight Seals). These poet-saints, known as the Ashtasakha, composed verses that are not categorized as traditional prayers or petitions; rather, they are vivid, first-person eyewitness accounts of Krishna's Leelas (divine pastimes). The singing is strictly timed to the Ashtayam (eight periods of the day) to mirror the eternal daily routine of Shrinathji in Braj.

Chaitanya Mahaprabhu popularized adolescent the love between Radha and Krishna based extatic public san-kirtan in Bengal, with Hare Krishna mantra other songs and dances, wherein the love between Radha and Krishna was symbolized as the love between one's soul and God.

Sankardev in Assam helped establish satras (temples and monasteries) with kirtan-ghar (also called namghar), for singing and dramatic performance of Krishna-related theology.

=== Holy places ===
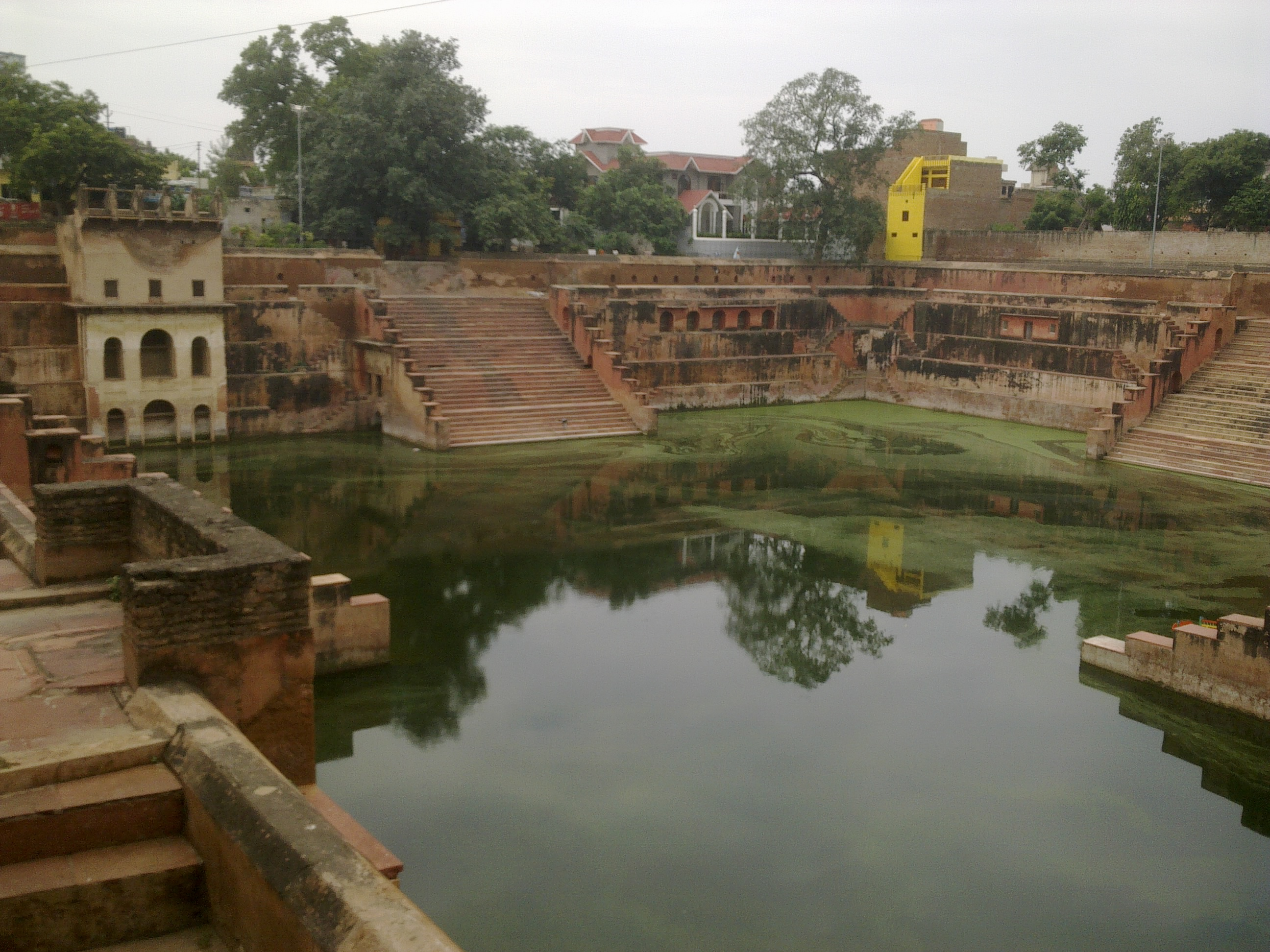
Potra Kund in Krishna Janmasthan Temple Complex, Mathura, is believed to have been used for the first bath of child Krishna after his birth.

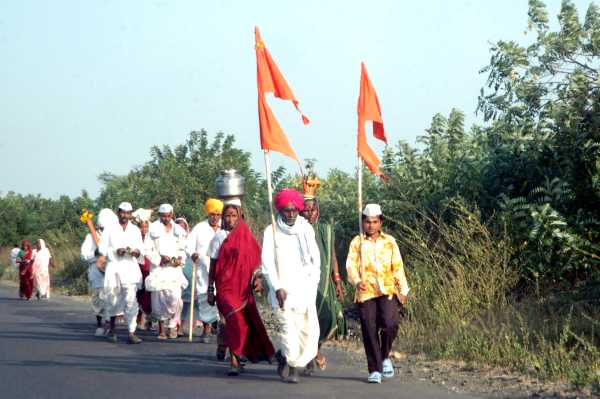
Warkari pilgrims, Maharashtra.

The three main pilgrimage sites related to Krishna circuit are "48 kos parikrama of Kurukshetra" in Haryana state, "Vraja Parikrama" at Mathura in Uttar Pradesh and "Dwarka Parkarma" (Dwarkadish yatra) at Dwarkadhish Temple in Gujarat.

Vrindavan, Uttar Pradesh, is often considered to be a holy place by majority of traditions of Krishnaism. It's a center of Krishna worship and the area includes places like Govardhana and Gokula associated with Krishna from time immemorial. Many millions of bhaktas or devotees of Krishna visit these places of pilgrimage every year and participate in a number of festivals that relate to the scenes from Krishna's life on Earth.

On the other hand, Goloka is considered the eternal abode of Krishna, Svayam Bhagavan according to some Krishnaite schools, including Gaudiya Vaishnavism. The scriptural basis for this is taken in Brahma Samhita and Bhagavata Purana.

The Dwarkadhish Temple (Dwarka, Jujarat) and the Jagannath Temple (Puri, Odisha) are particularly significant in Krishnaism, and are regarded have been two of the four major pilgrimage destinations for most Hindus as the Char Dham pilgrimage sites.

== Demography ==
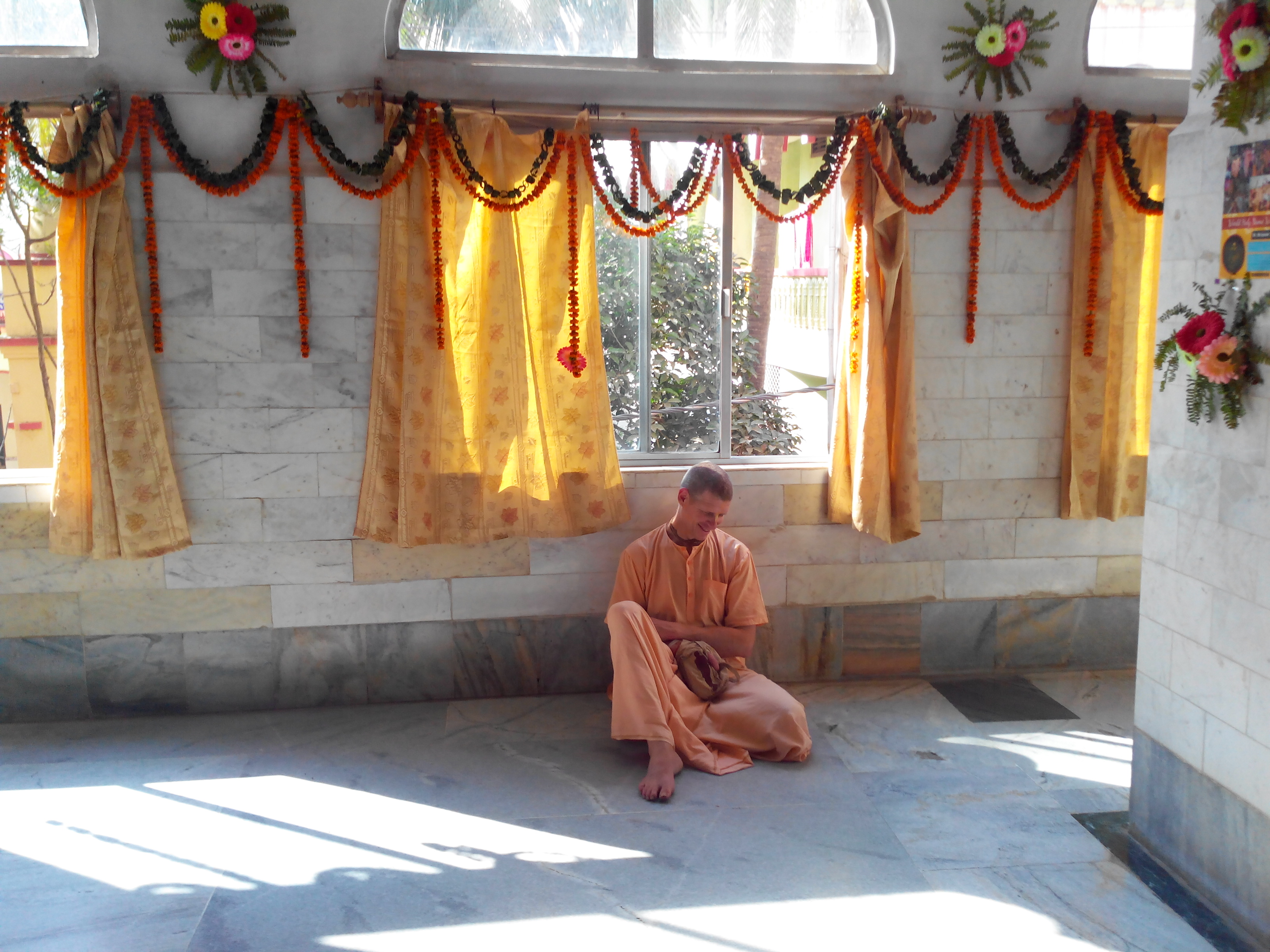
Western Hare Krishna devotee.

There are adherents of Krishnaism in all strata of Indian society, but a tendency has been revealed, for example, Bengal Gaudiya Vaishnavas belong to the lower middle castes, while the upper castes as well as lowest castes and tribes are Shaktas.

Krishnaism has a limited following outside of India, especially associated with 1960s counter-culture, including a number of celebrity followers, such as George Harrison, due to its promulgation throughout the world by the founder-acharya of the International Society for Krishna Consciousness (ISKCON) A.C. Bhaktivedanta Swami Prabhupada. The first Hindu member of the United States Congress Tulsi Gabbard is follower of the Krishnaite organisation Science of Identity Foundation.

== Krishnaism and Christianity ==
Debaters have often alleged a number of parallels between Krishnaism and Christianity, originating with Kersey Graves' The World's Sixteen Crucified Saviors claiming 346 parallels between Krishna and Jesus, theorizing that Christianity emerged as a result of an import of pagan concepts upon Judaism. Some 19th- to early 20th-century scholars writing on Jesus Christ in comparative mythology (John M. Robertson, Christianity and Mythology, 1910) even sought to derive both traditions from a common predecessor religion. (Note: "John M. Robertson wrote a learned treatise entitled "Christ and Krishna", and in that work he argued that there was no direct contact between Krishnaism and Christianity; but that both sects were derived from an earlier common source.")

== Gallery of key Krishnaite temples ==
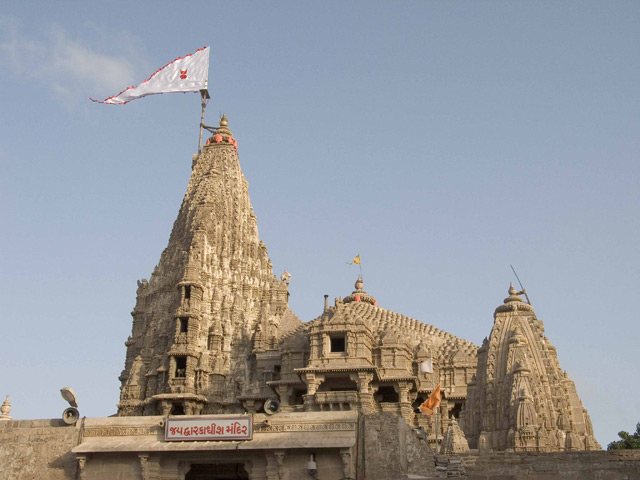
Dwarkadhish Temple, Dwarka, Gujarat

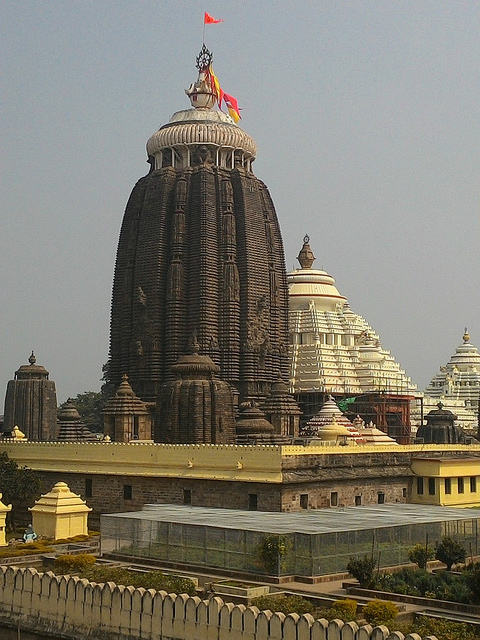
Jagannath Temple, Puri, Odisha

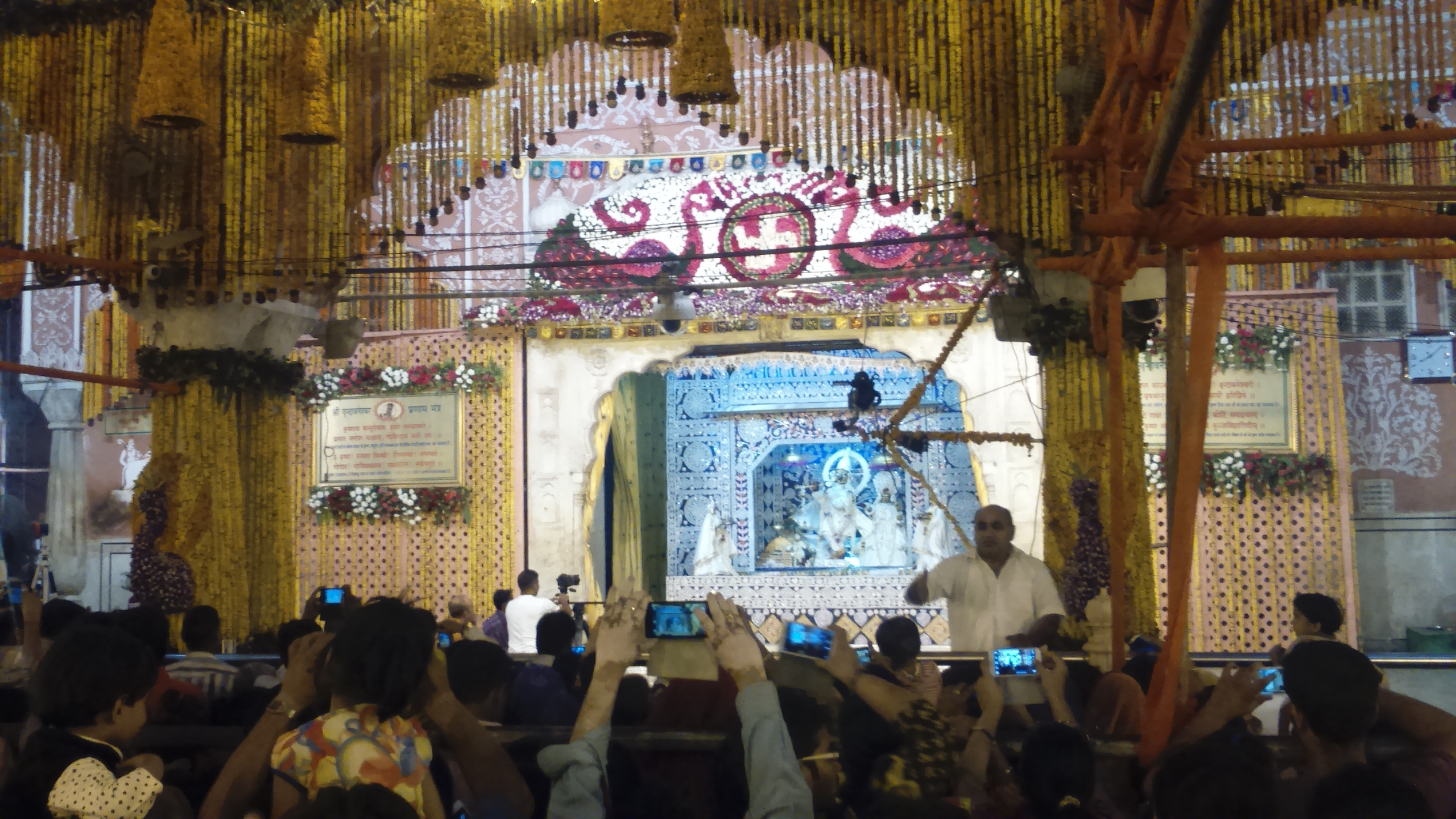
Govind Dev Ji Temple, Jaipur, Rajasthan

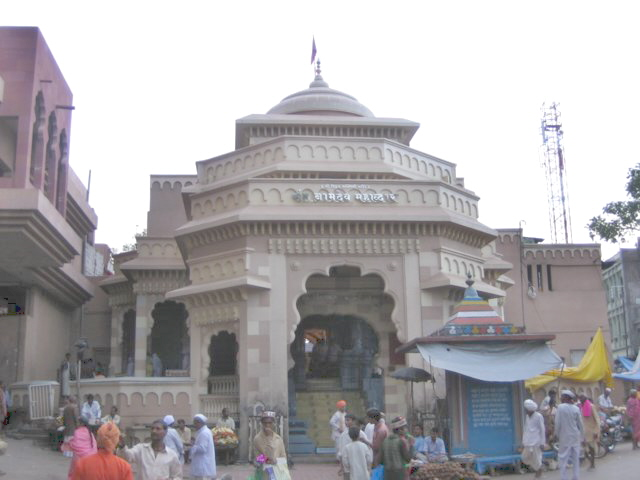
Vithoba Temple, Maharashtra

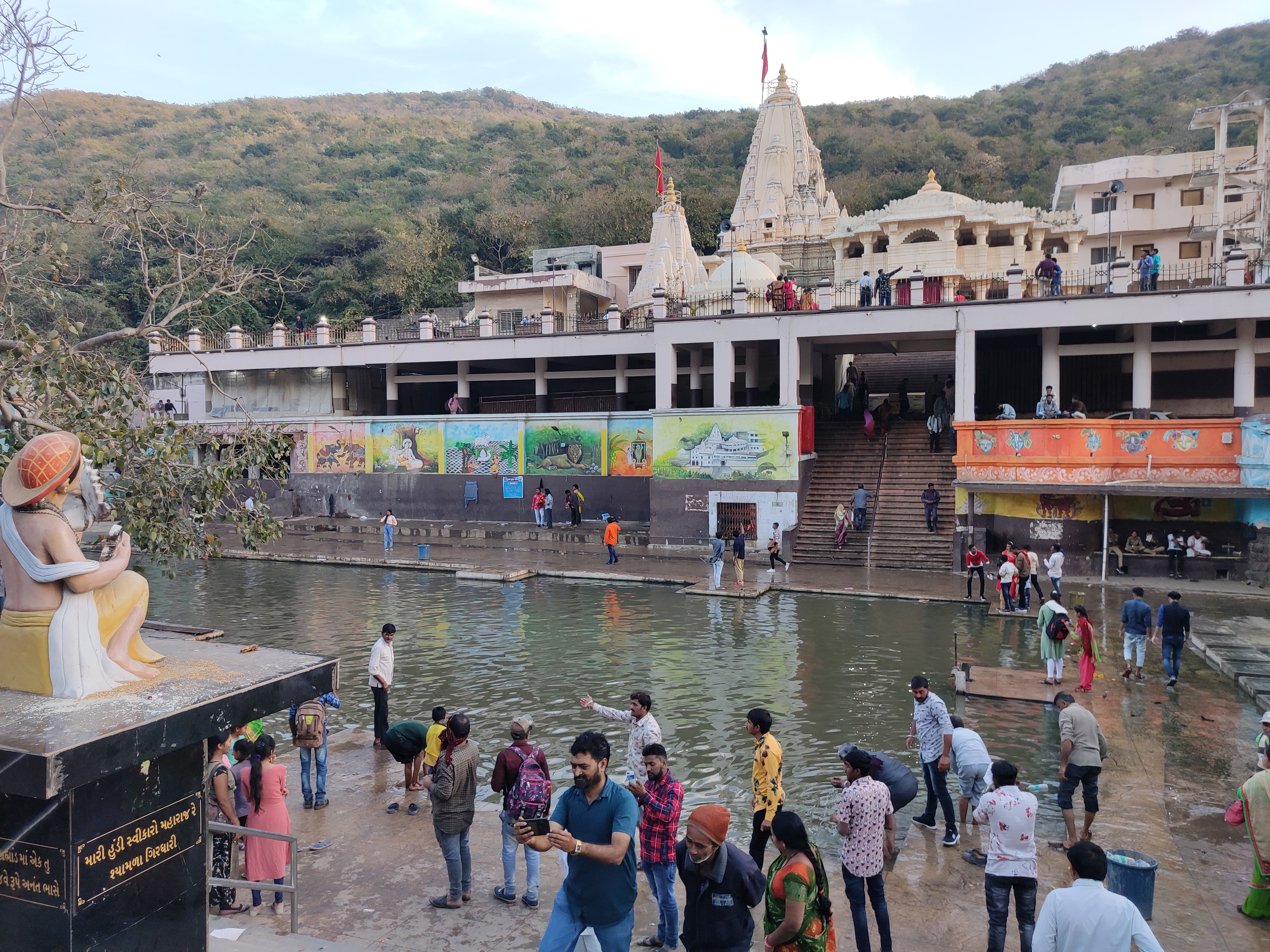
Radha Damodar Temple, Junagadh, Gujarat

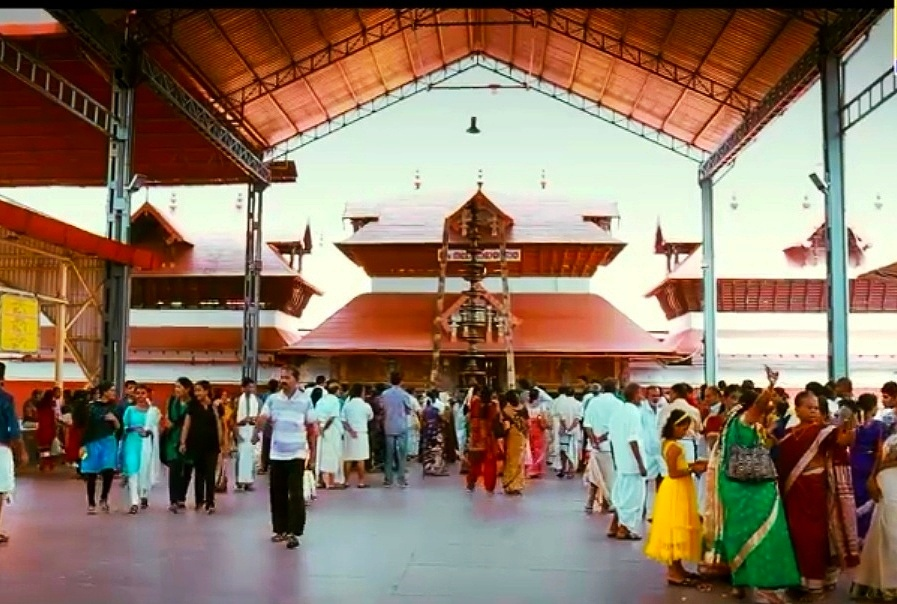
Guruvayur Temple, Guruvayur, Kerala

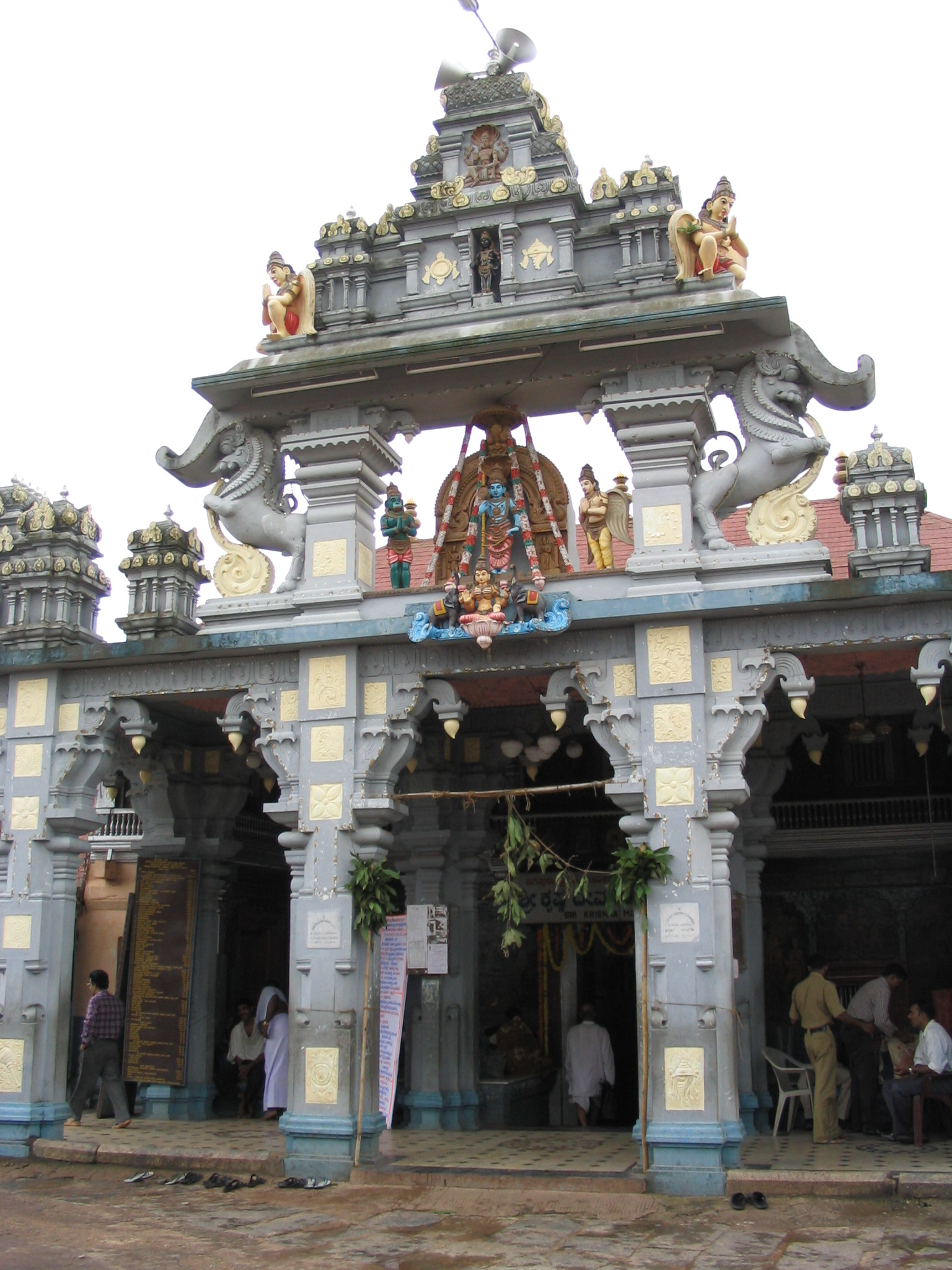
Udupi Sri Krishna Matha, Udupi, Karnataka

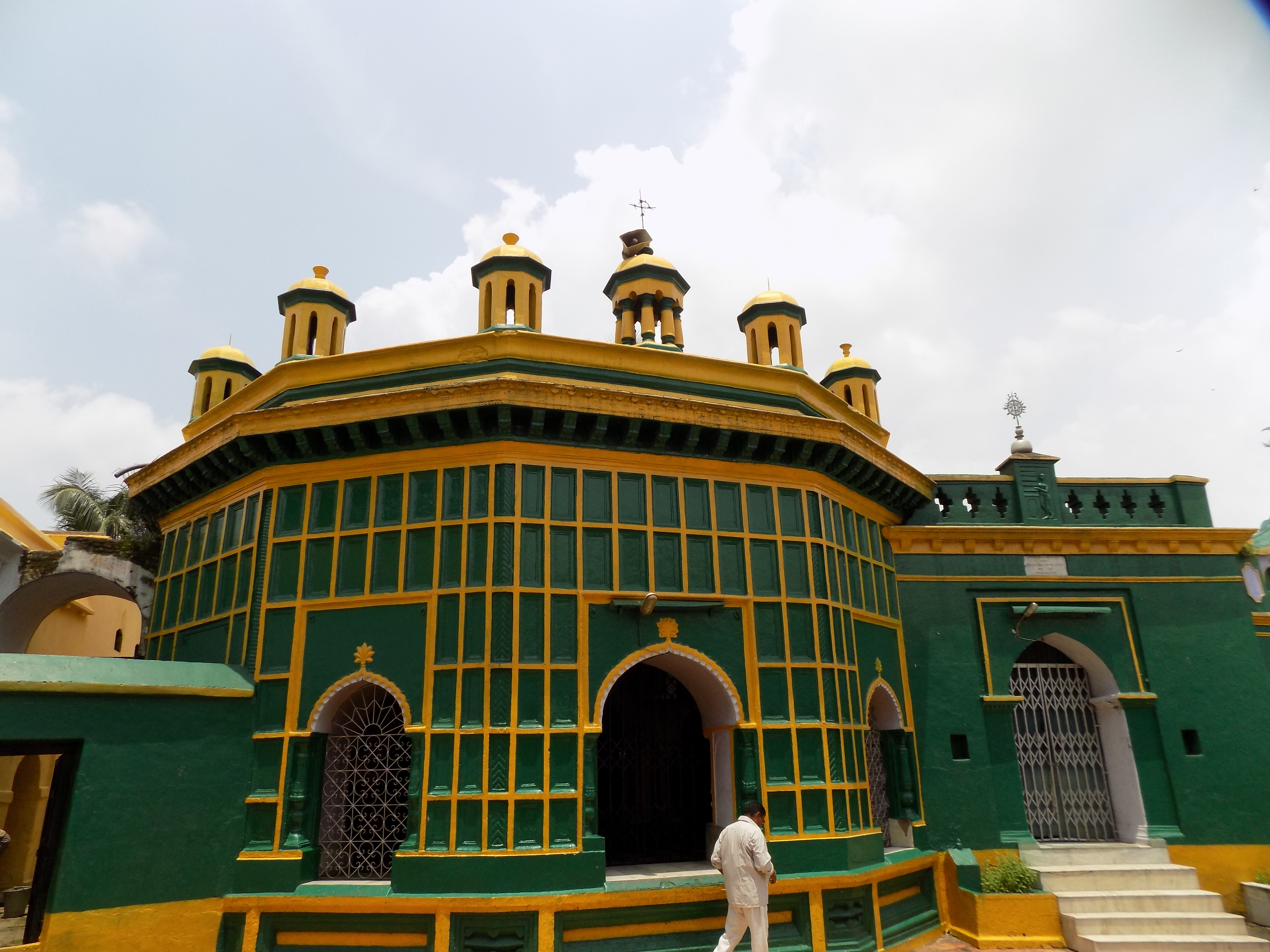
Ukhra Mahanta Asthal, West Bengal

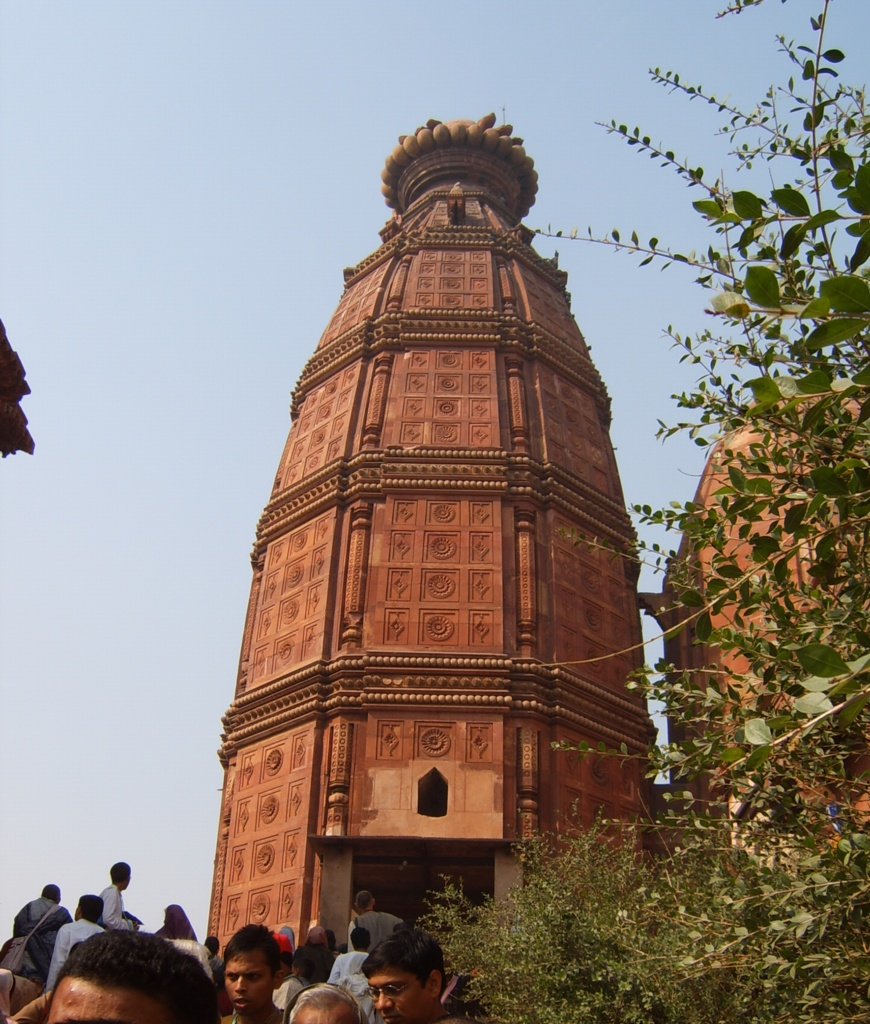
Radha Madan Mohan Temple, Vrindavan

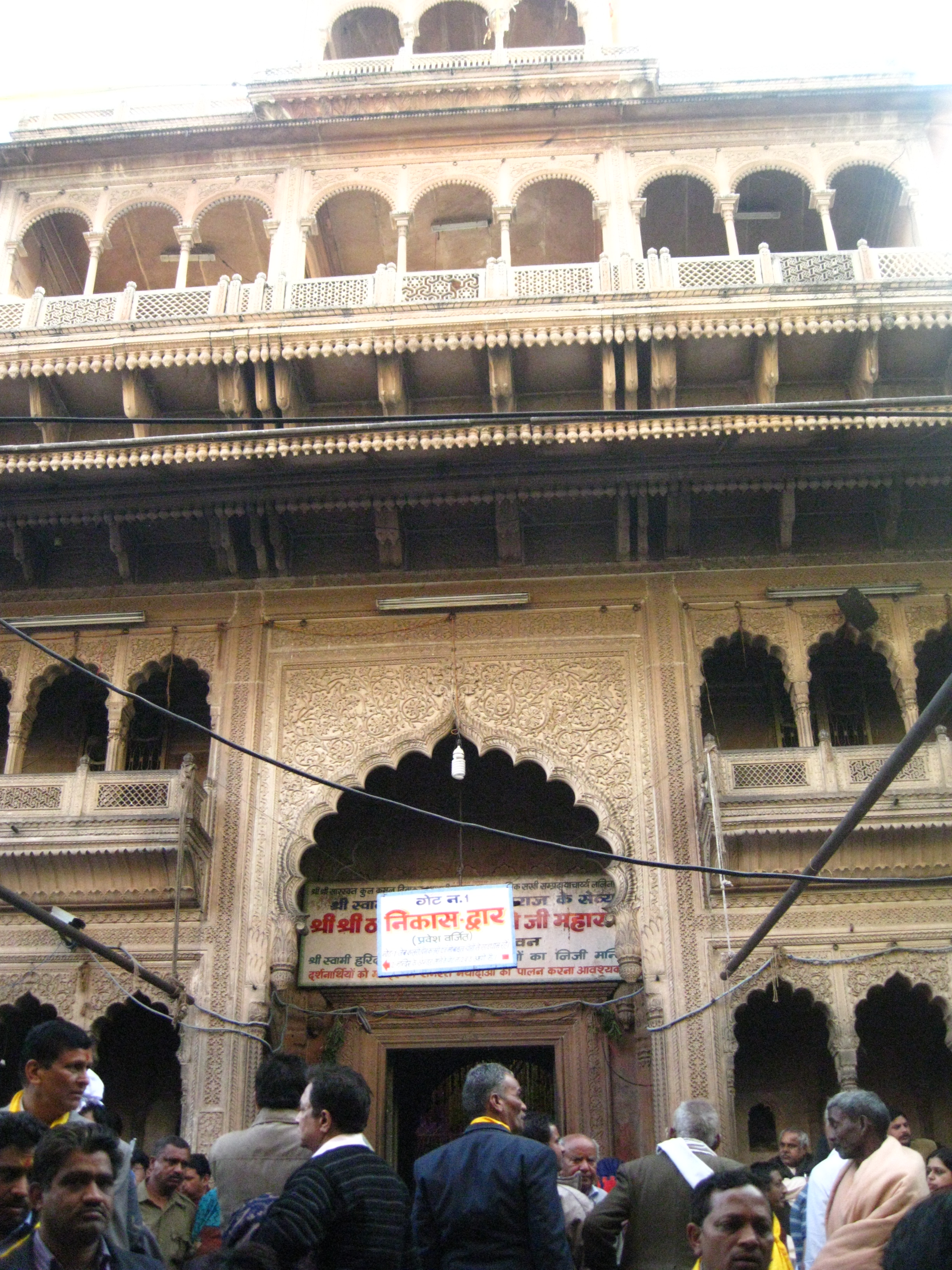
Bankey Bihari Temple, Vrindavan

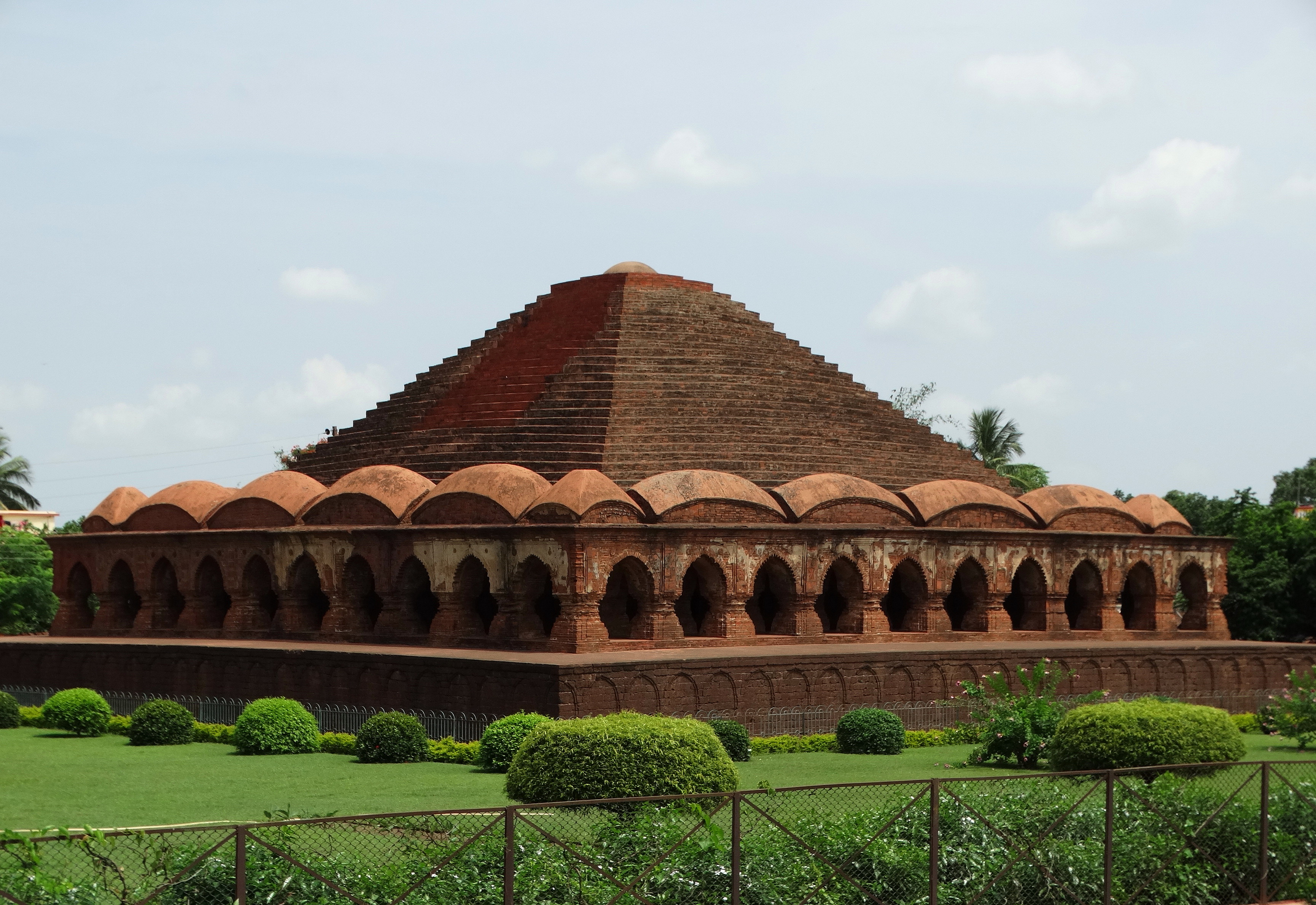
Rasmancha, Bishnupur, West Bengal

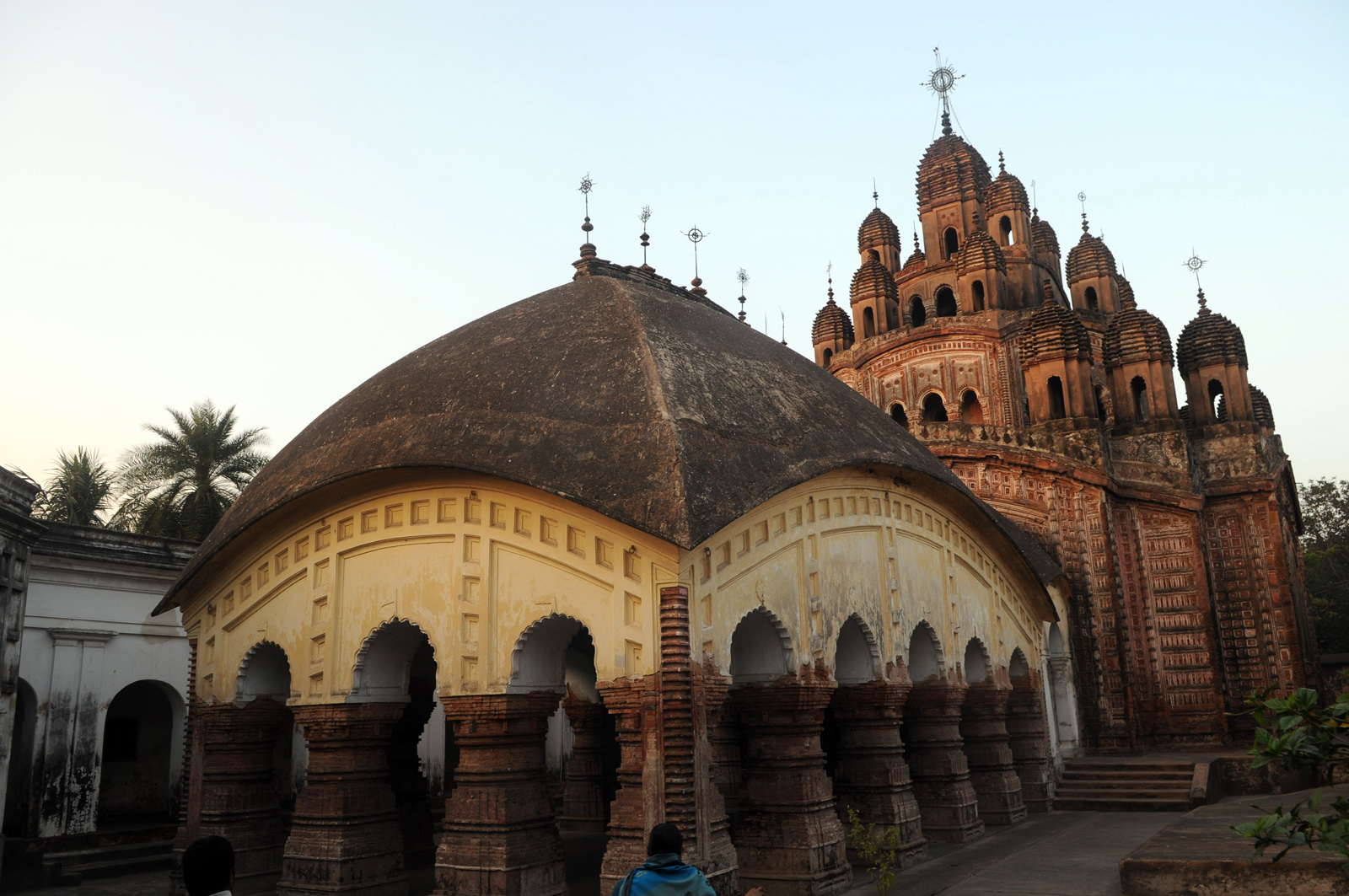
Lalji Temple, Kalna

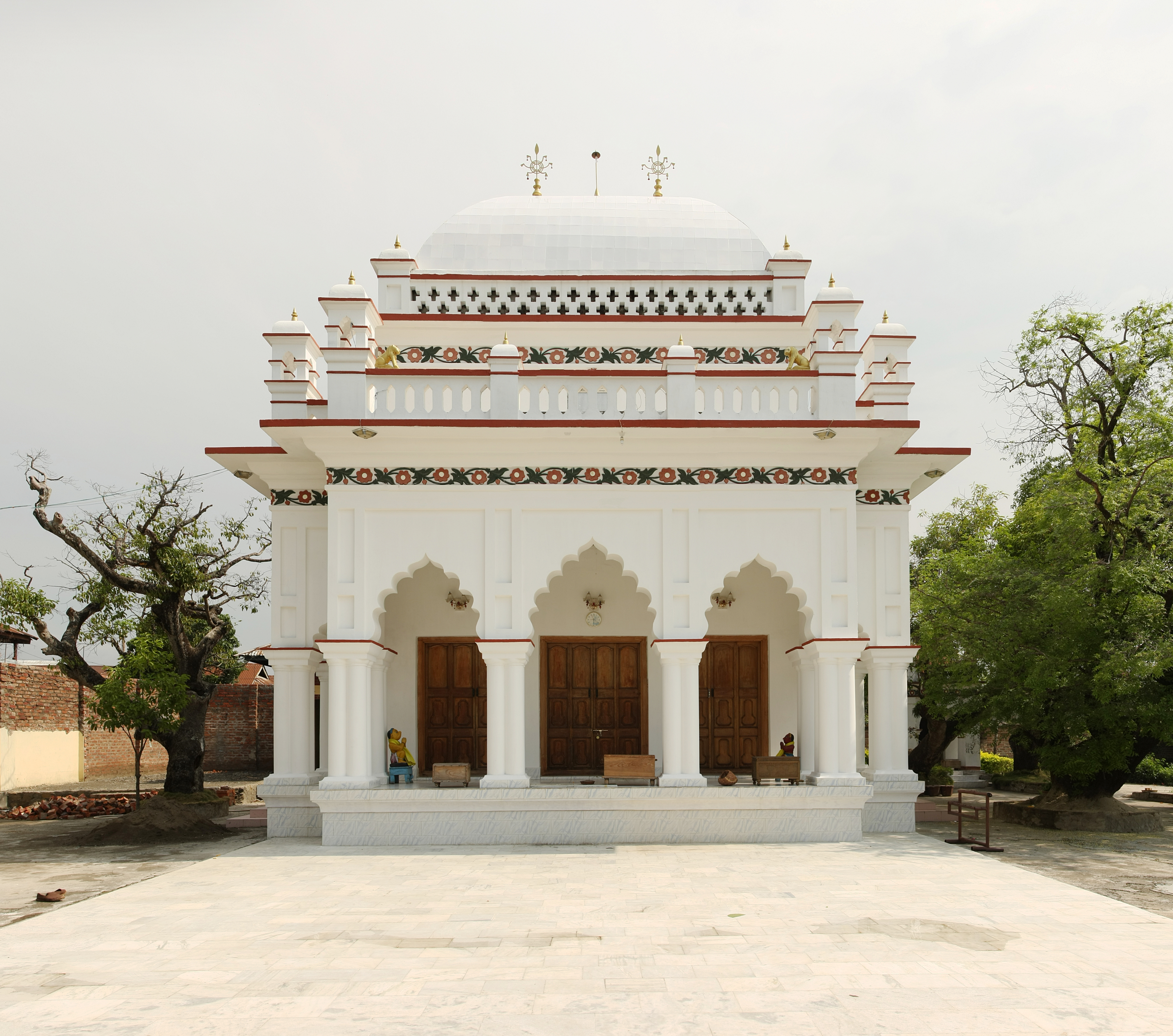
Ningthoukhong Gopinath Temple, Manipur

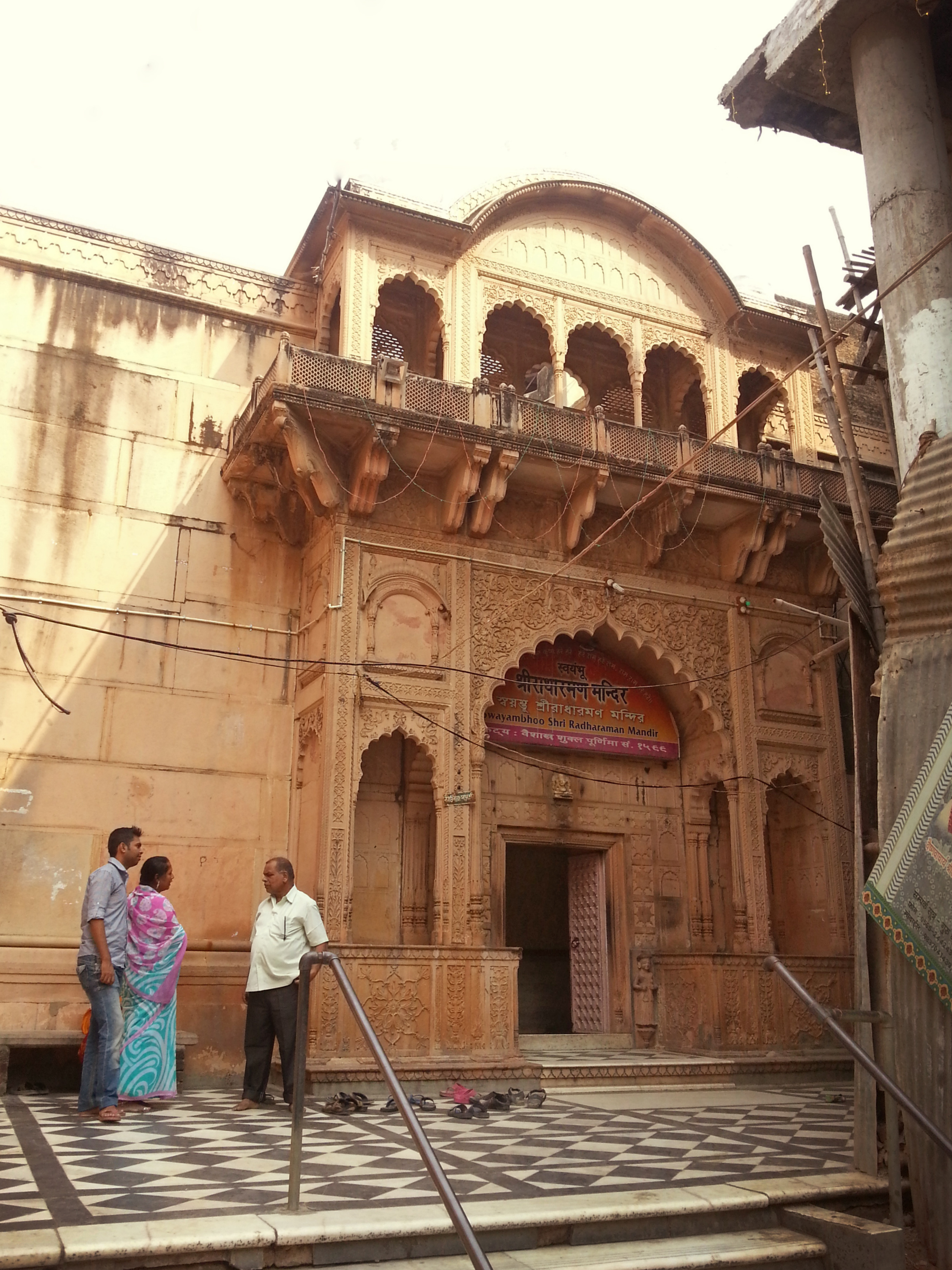
Radha Raman Temple, Vrindavan

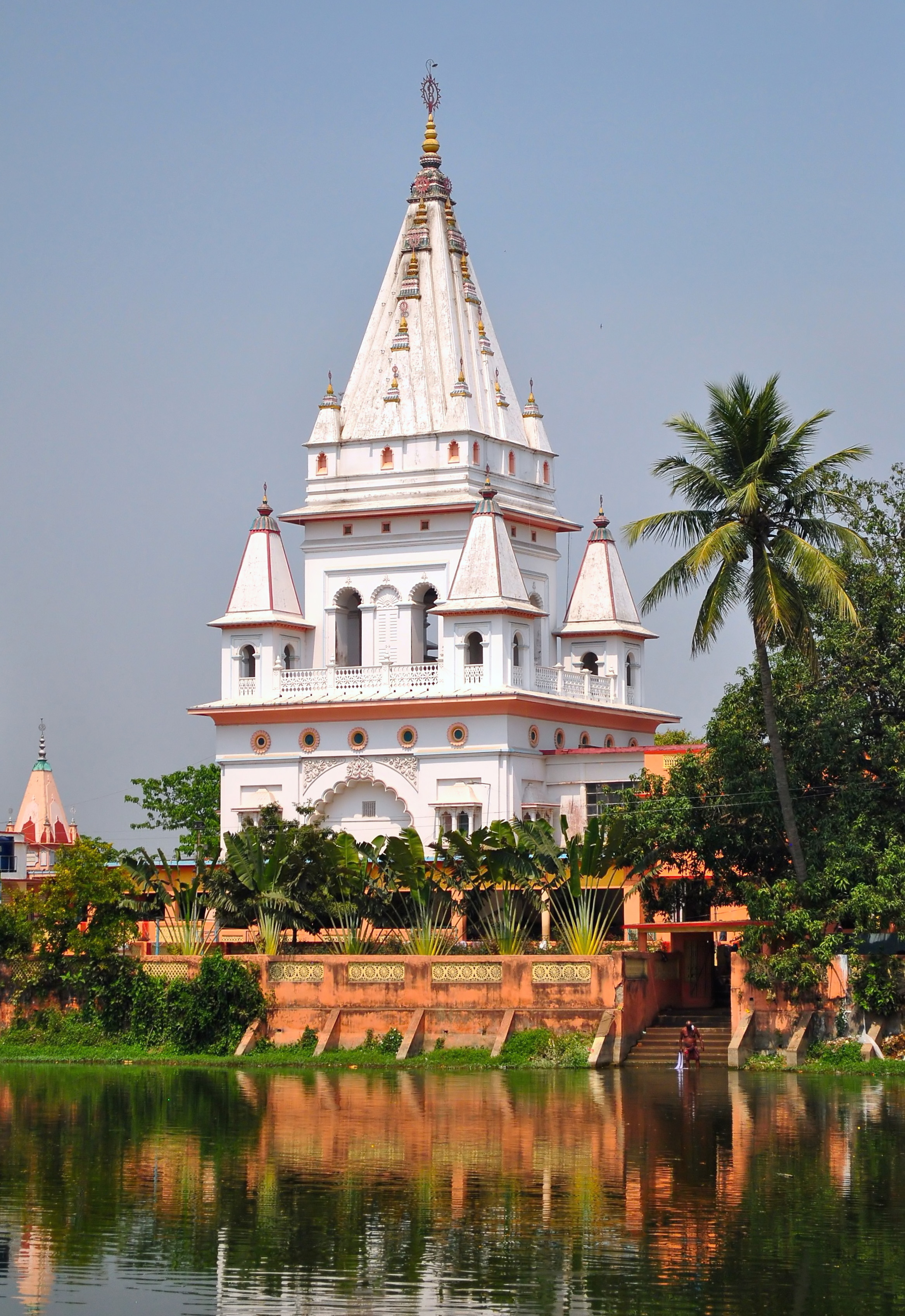
Yogapith Temple, Mayapur

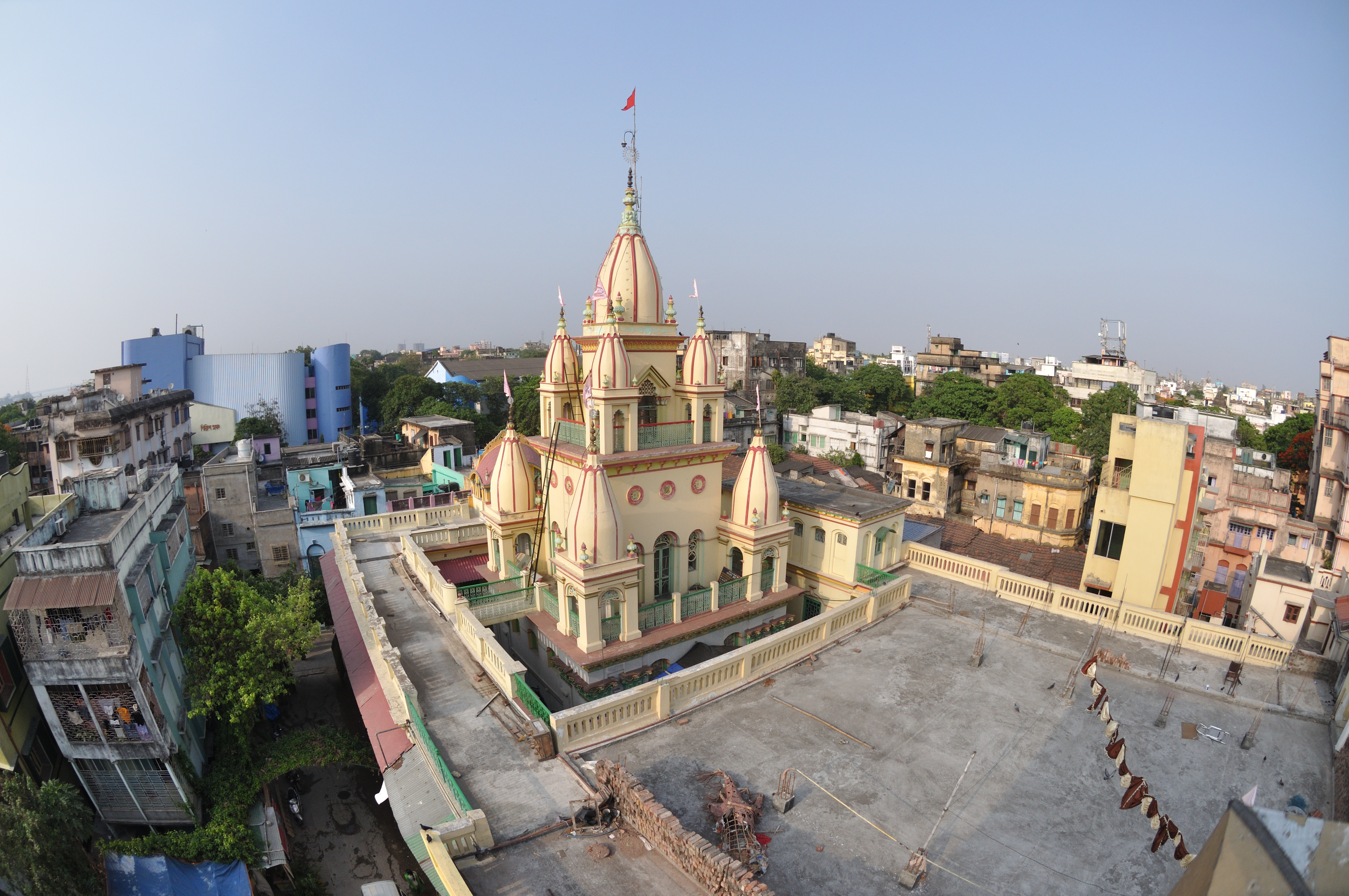
Gour Nitai Temple, Gaudiya Math, Kolkata

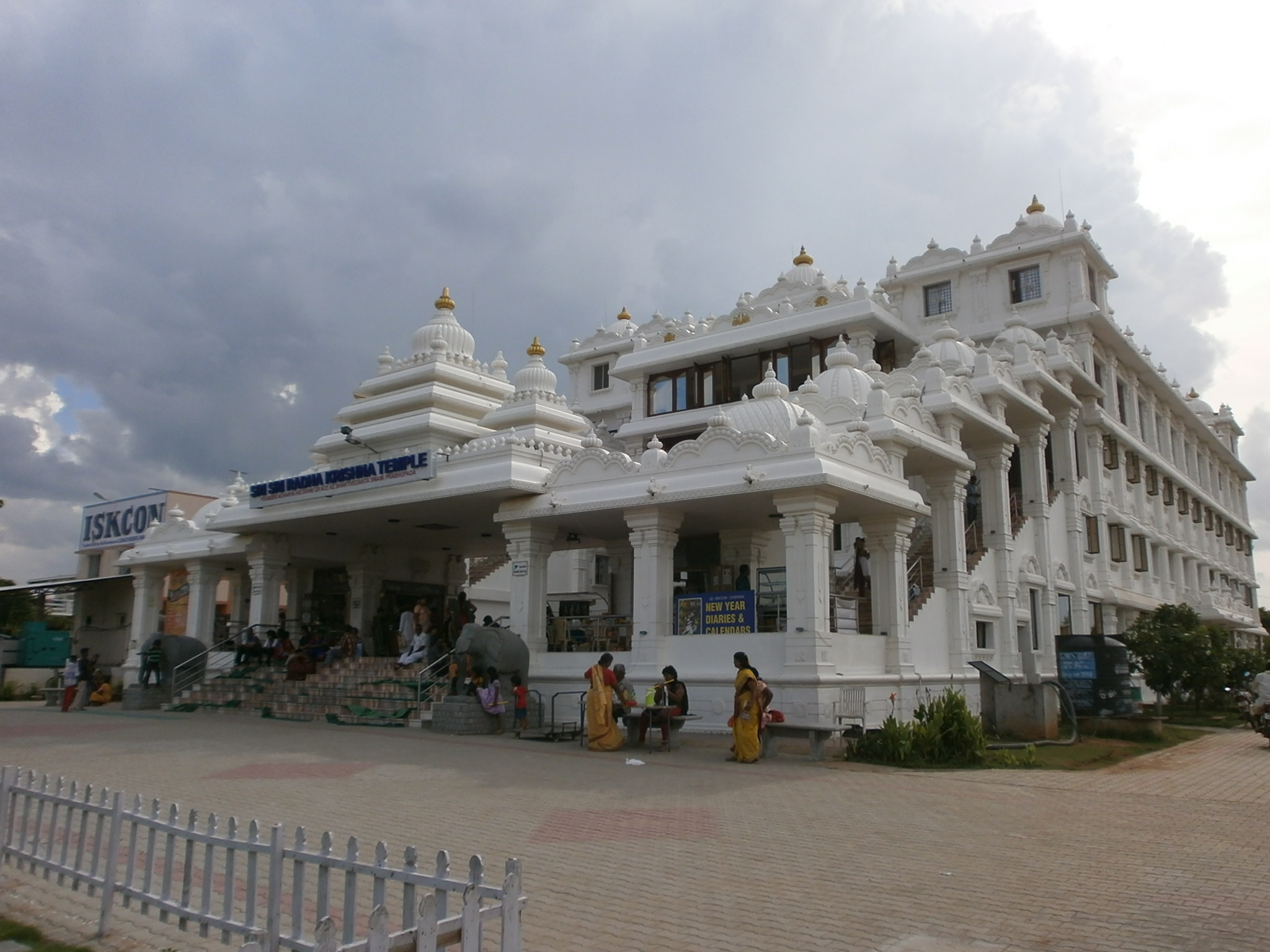
Sri Sri Radha Krishna Mandir, Chennai

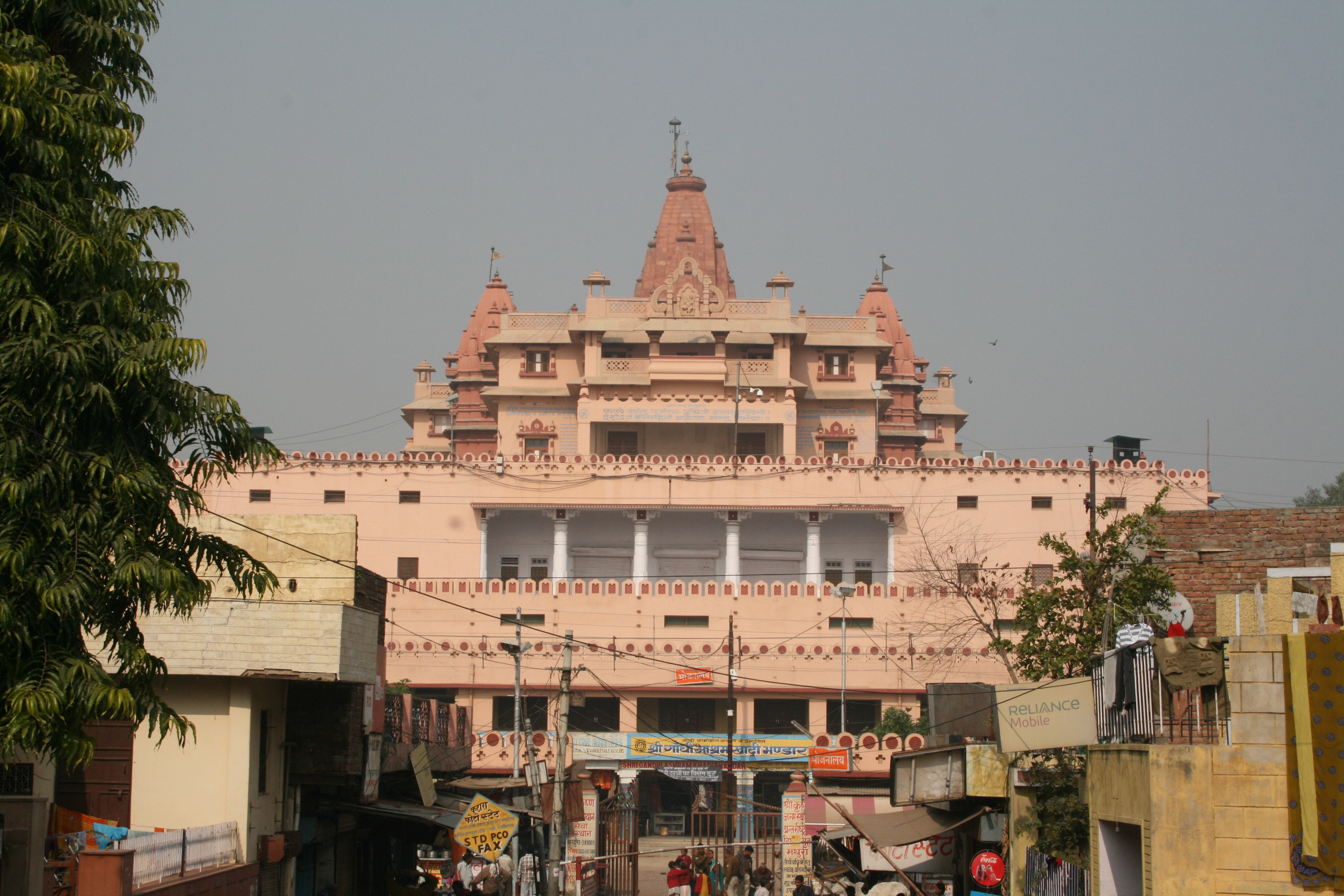
Krishna Janmasthan Temple Complex, Mathura

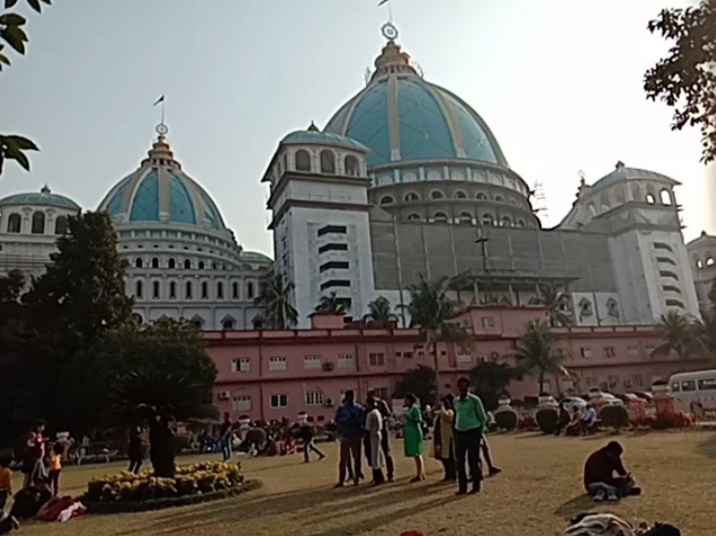
Mayapur Chandrodaya Mandir, Mayapur

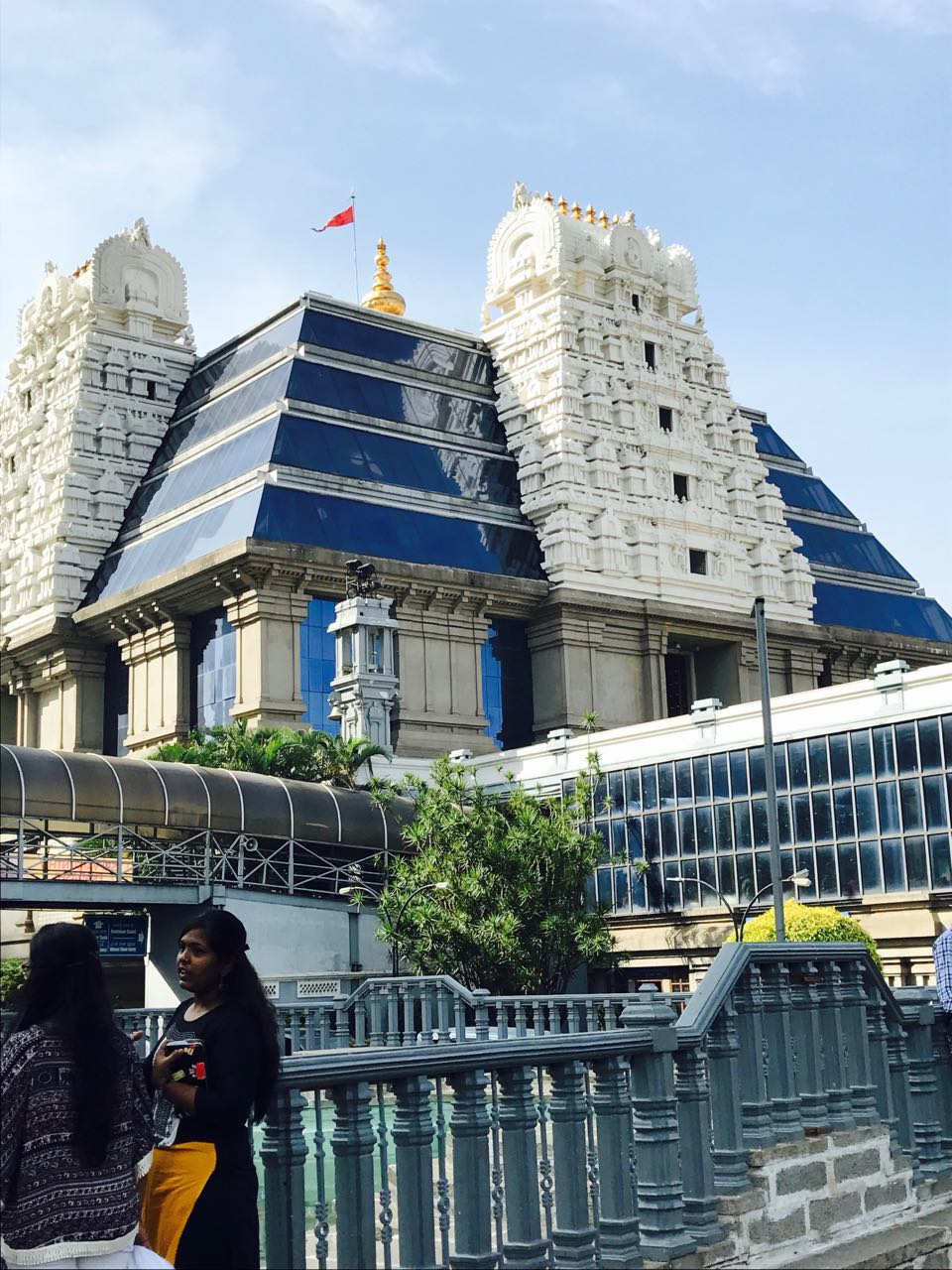
Sri Radha Krishna-chandra Temple, Bangalore

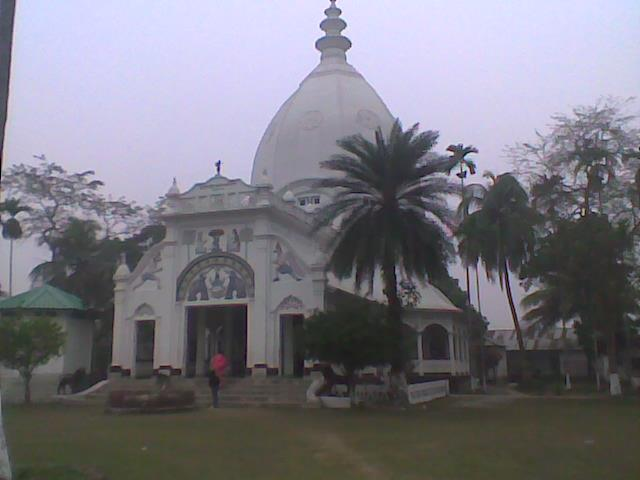
Madhupur Satra, West Bengal

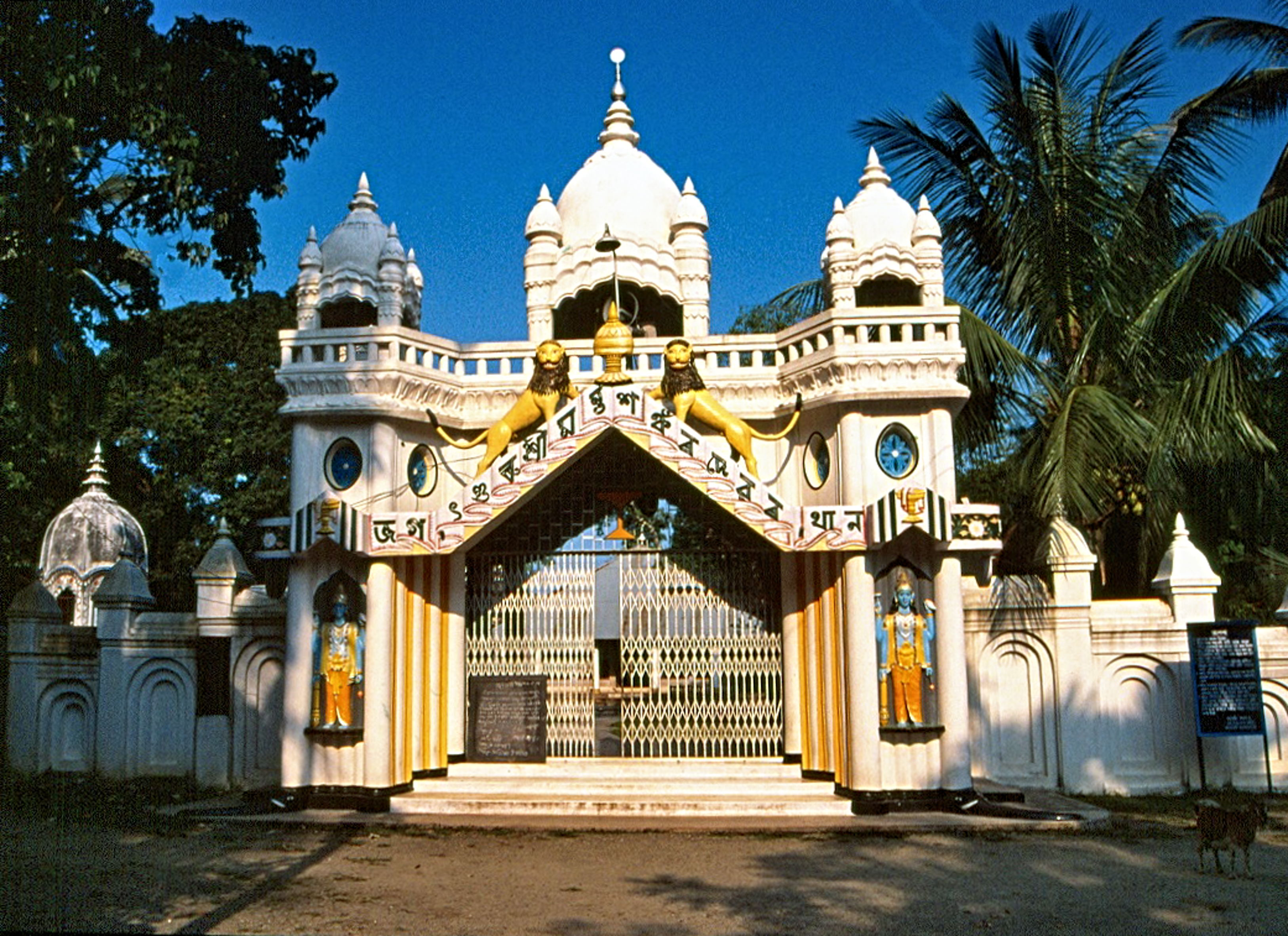
Barpeta Satra, Assam

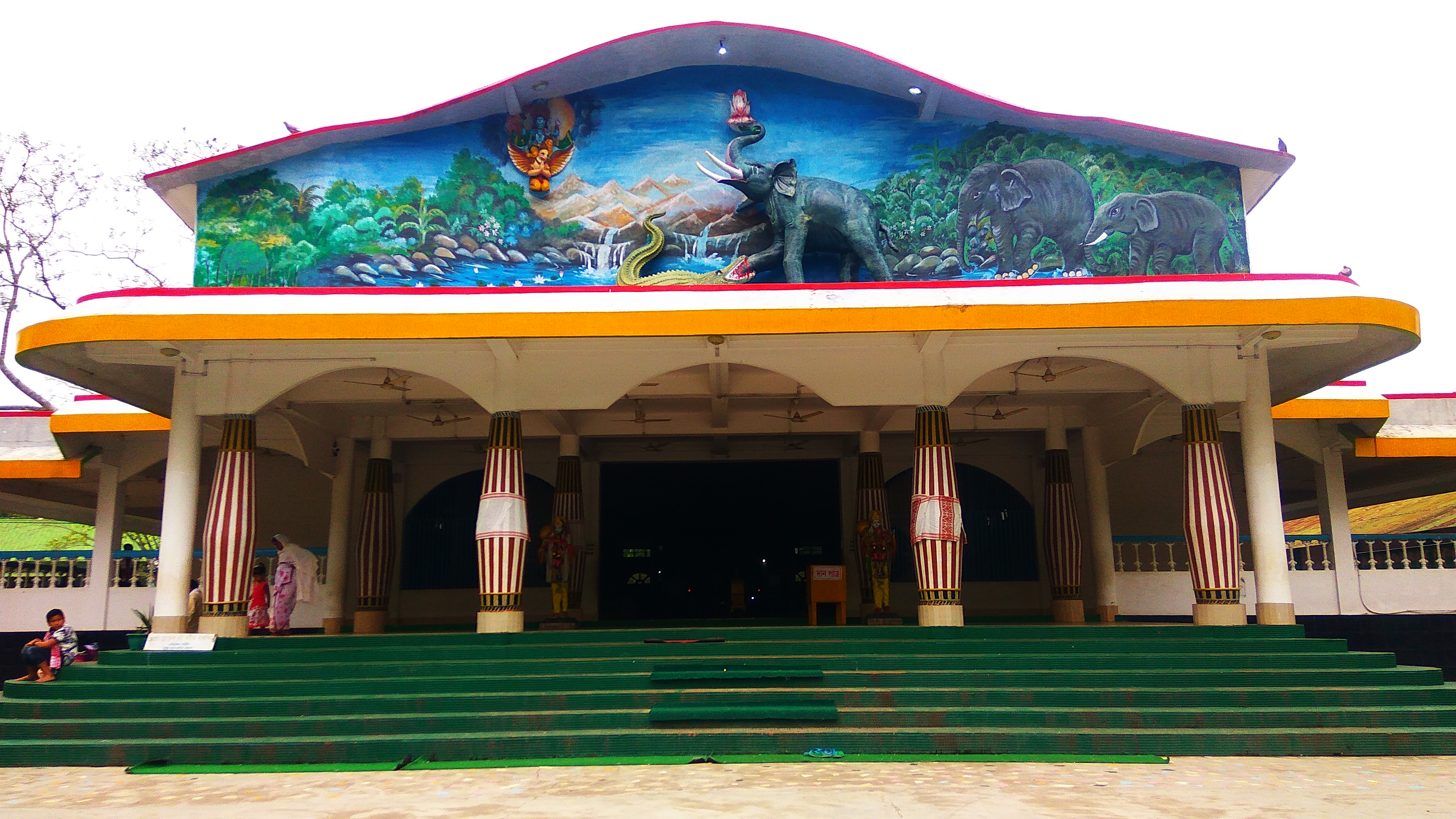
Athkheliya Namghar, Golaghat, Assam

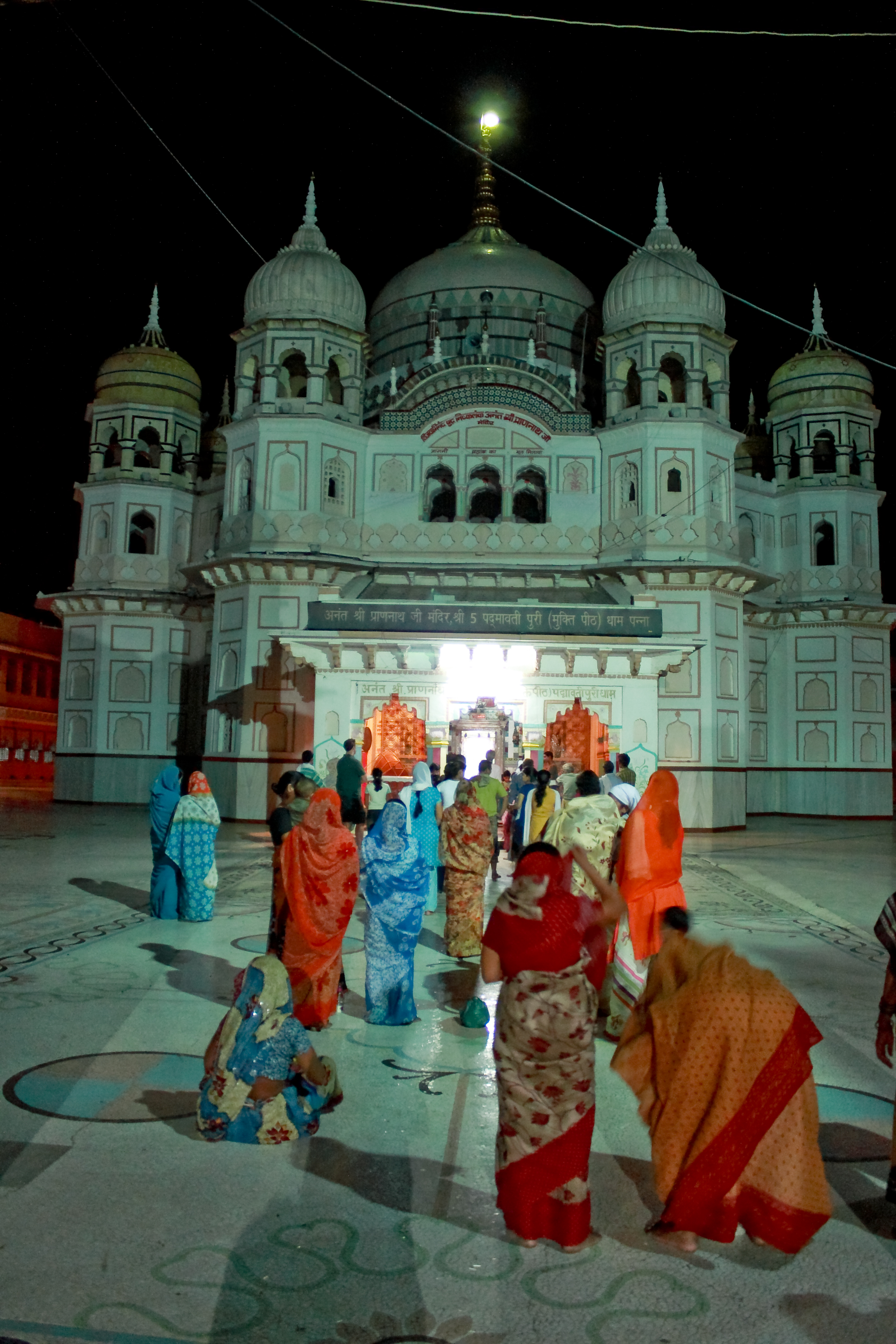
Krishna Pranami Mandir, Patna, Madhya Pradesh

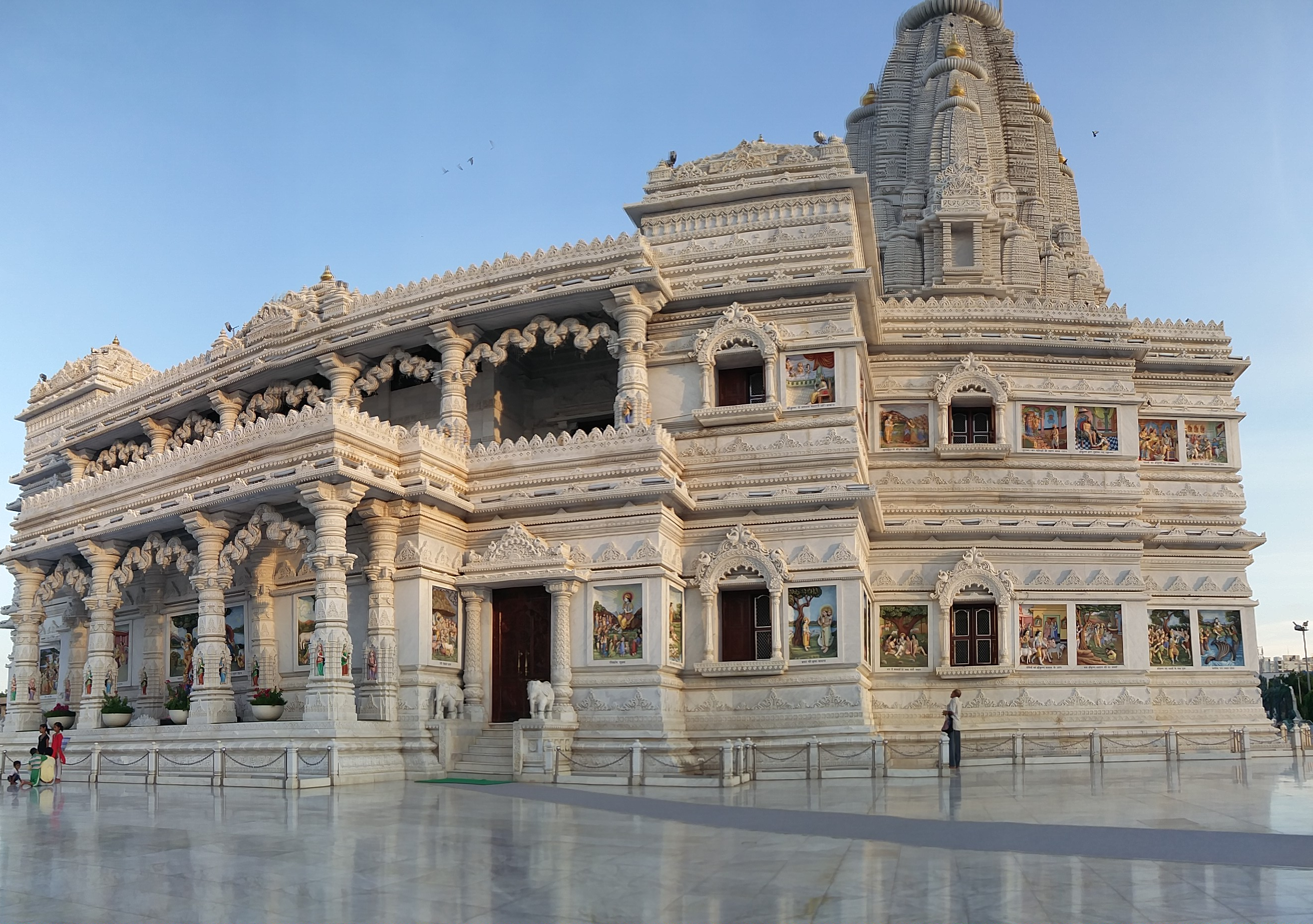
Prem Mandir, Vrindavan

== See also ==
- Lokhimon, a Vaishnavism movement followed by the Karbi people of Northeast India
