= Ashtasakhi =

Group of eight closest companions of Radha-Krishna

- Member of Gopis
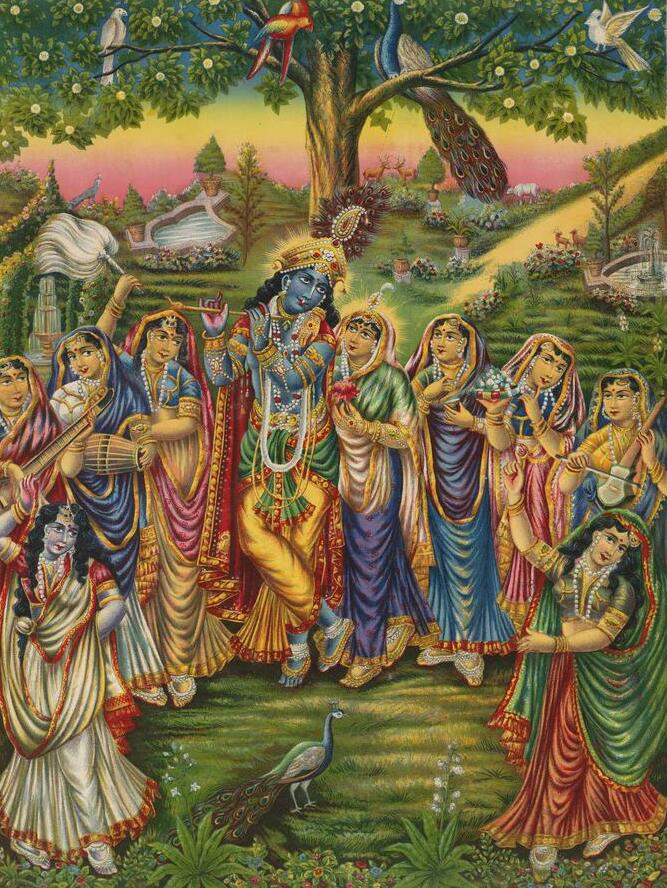
- Radha Krishna at centre with Ashtasakhi
- Other names: Ashtagopi
- Devanagari: अष्टसखी
- Sanskrit transliteration: Aṣṭasakhī
- Venerated in: Radha Vallabh Sampradaya, Nimbarka Sampradaya, Gaudiya Vaishnavism, Pushtimarg, Haridasi Sampradaya
- Affiliation: Gopi; Avatar of Radha; Krishnaism
- Abode: Goloka, Vrindavan, Barsana
- Gender: Female
- Region: Braj region
- Temple: Sri Radha Rasbihari Ashtasakhi Temple, Vrindavan
- Festivals: Holi, Sharad Purnima, Kartik Purnima, Lathmar Holi

Genealogy
- Consort: Krishna
- Dynasty: Yaduvamsha-Chandravamsha

The Ashtasakhi (Sanskrit: अष्टसखी, IAST: Ashtāsākhi) are a group of eight prominent gopis and close associates of the Hindu deities Radha-Krishna in the Braj region. In many sub-traditions of Krishnaism, they are revered as goddesses and consorts of Krishna. According to the Padma Purana, the Ashtasakhi are the eternal female companions of Radha and Krishna in the Dvapara Yuga, with whom they descended upon the earth from their celestial abode of Goloka.

The popular list of Ashtasakhi include: Lalita, Vishaka, Champaklata, Chitra, Tungavidhya, Induleka, Rangadevi, and Sudevi. All of these eight prominent gopis are regarded to be an expansion of Radha, the chief consort of Krishna.

== Description ==
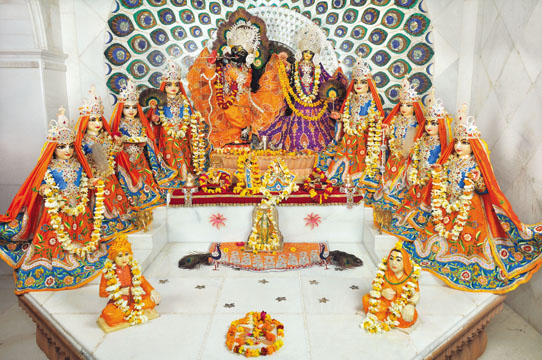
Ashtasakhi with Radha Krishna at Sri Radha Rasbihari Ashtasakhi Temple, Vrindavan

Lalita: Out of eight prominent sakhi, Lalita is the foremost sakhi. She is the eldest gopi among Ashtasakhi and is 27 days older than Radha. She was born to her parents Visoka (father) and Saradi (mother) in Unchagaon, near Barsana. A temple called Sri Lalita Sakhi Temple, Unchagaon is situated in her village which is dedicated to her. In Radha-Krishna pastimes, it is the duty of Lalita to pacify Radha when she feels separation from Krishna and then arrange a meeting of Radha-Krishna. In Kaliyuga, Swami Haridas, the popular saint and musician of Vrindavan is said to be the incarnation of Lalita. He manifested the idol of Banke Bihari in Nidhivan, Vrindavan.

Vishaka: The second prominent gopi is the Vishaka. The service Visakha renders is Vastralankara or arranging for the clothing and ornamentation of the divine couple. She is exactly the same age as Radha. Vishakaha is believed to be born in Kamai village to her parents Pavana (father) and Vahika (mother). In Kaliyuga, Swami Hariram Vyas is believed to be the incarnation of Vishakha. A temple dedicated to Vishaka called Sri Vishakha Radha Raman Bihariji Temple is situated in her village Kamai, Uttar Pradesh.

Champaklata: Champaklata is the third most senior gopi in group of Ashtasakhi. She is born to her mother Vatika Devi and father Arama in Karahla village in Braj region. Champaklata is one day younger than Radha and her primary service includes collecting fruits and vegetables from forest and then cooking meals for the divine couple Radha-Krishna. A temple dedicated to Champaklata called, Sri Champaklata Sakhi Temple is situated in Karhala, Uttar Pradesh. In Pushtimarg tradition, Padmanabhdas, disciple of Vallabhacharya, is believed to be the incarnation of Champaklata.

Chitra: Chitra is the fourth prominent gopi, who was born to her mother Carcika and father Catura in Chiksauli village, Uttar Pradesh. She is 26 days older than Radha. She is expert in playing music on pots filled with varying degrees of water. She is well versed in the literature related to astronomy and astrology and is also well versed in the theoretical and practical activities of protecting domestic animals. She is especially expert at gardening. A temple known as Sri Chitra Sakhi Temple, Chiksauli is present in her village and is dedicated to her.

Tungavidhya: Tungavidya is the fifth prominent companion in group of Ashtasakhi. She is fifteen days older than Radha and is born to parents Medha-devi (mother) and Puskara (father) in Dabhala village, Uttar Pradesh. She is learned in transcendental mellows, morality, dancing, drama, literature and all other arts and sciences. She is a celebrated music teacher and expert at playing the Veena and singing. A temple called Sri Tungavidya Sakhi Temple in Dabhala is dedicated to her.

Indulekha: Induleka is the sixth prominent sakhi. She is born to her father Sagara and mother Vela Devi in Anjanoka village, Uttar Pradesh. Her main service is to prepare food for Radha-Krishna and some authorities say that another of her primary services is dancing. Indulekha is three days younger than Radha. A temple called Sri Indulekha Sakhi temple in Anjanoka is dedicated to her.

Rangadevi: Rangadevi is the seventh prominent gopi in Ashtasakhi. She was born to her parents Karuna-devi (mother) and Rangasara (father) in Rakholi. She is seven days younger than Radha. Her characteristics are similar to Champaklata. She is an expert logician and fond of joking with Radha in presence of Krishna. Her services include burning the aromatic incense, carrying coal during the winter and fanning the divine couple in the summer. A temple called Sri Radha Manohar Rangadevi Temple is present in Rakholi and is dedicated to her.

Sudevi: The last prominent gopi in group of Ashtasakhi is Sudevi. She is the twin sister of Rangadevi Sakhi and is born to mother Karuna-devi and father Rangasara in Rakholi. She is also seven days younger than Radha. In between Rangadevi and Sudevi, Rangadevi is elder than Sudevi by half day. Her main service is to offer water to the divine couple. A temple dedicated to Sudevi is situated in Sunhera village, Radhanagri district, Rajasthan and the temple is called Sri Sudevi Sakhi Temple.

== Symbolism ==
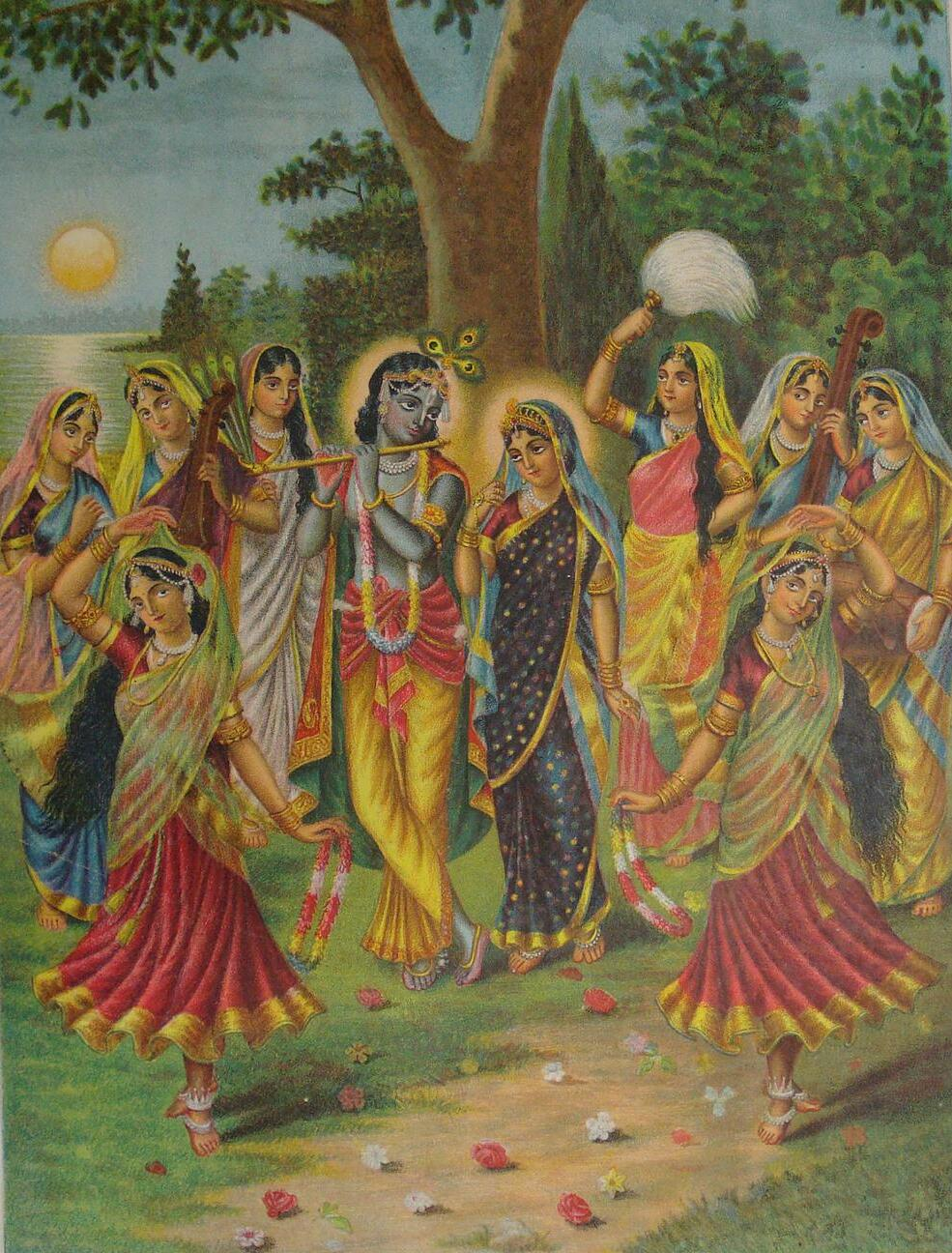
Radha Krishna with Ashtasakhi

In Vaishnavism, the gopis are known for their selfless love and dedication towards Krishna. They sometimes symbolize the yearning of the human soul for God. According to the Skanda Purana, the Ashtasakhi are the most prominent eight gopis out of millions of gopis of Radha-Krishna. They are an integral part of Raslila. In Shaktism, the Ashtasakhi are sometimes considered as the embodiment of the Ashta Siddhis (Aṇimā, Mahima, Garima, Laghima, Prāpti, Prākāmya, Iṣiṭva, and Vaśitva).

== Traditions ==
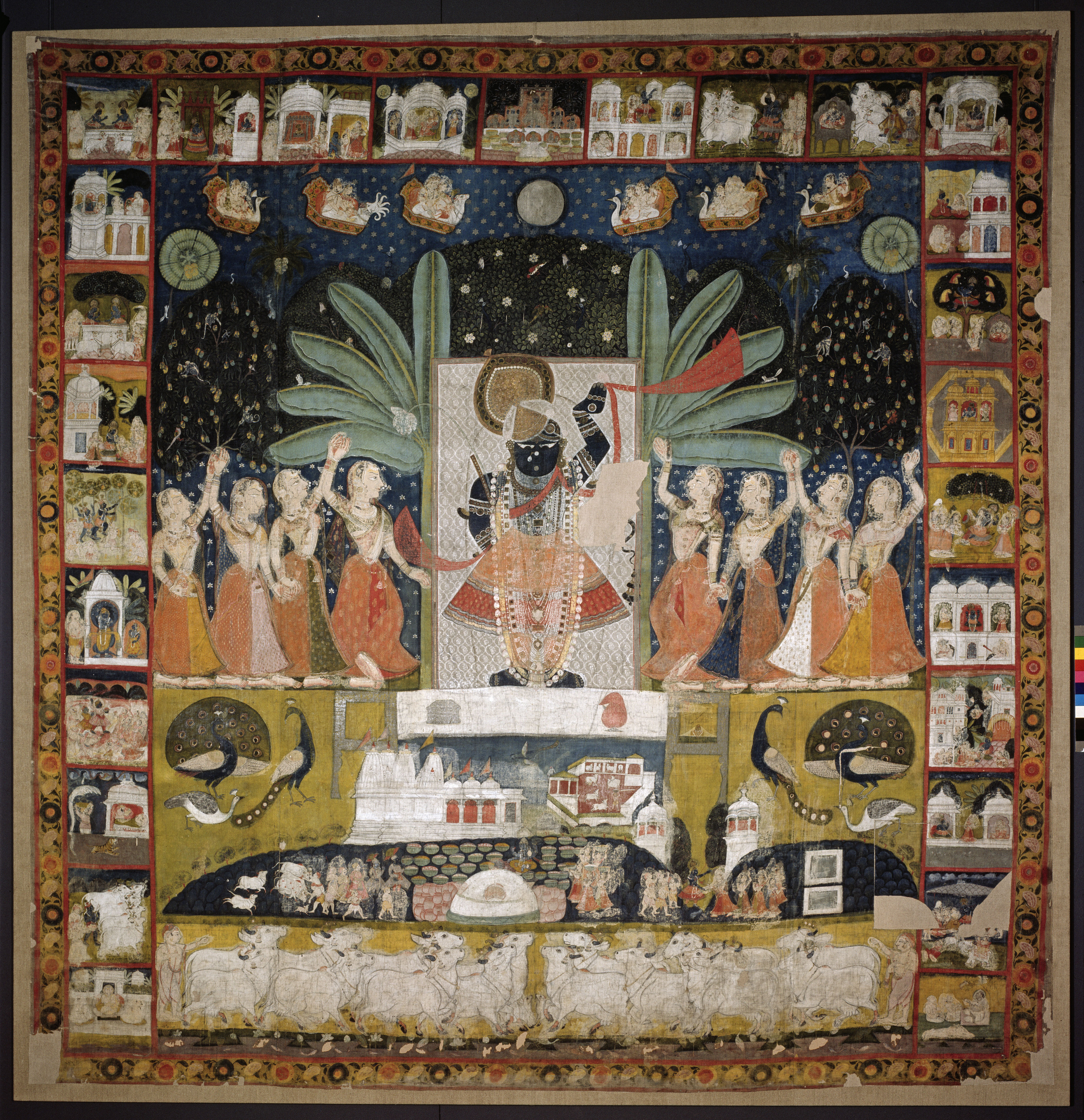
Shrinathji (a form of Krishna venerated in Pushtimarg - center) with Ashtasakhis.

In many Krishnaism traditions, Ashtasakhi are worshipped and through them Radha-Krishna are approached. Ashtasakhi play pivotal role in beliefs and practices of Vallabhacharya's Pushtimarg Sampradaya, Swami Haridas's Haidasi Sampradaya, Hith Harivansh Mahaprabhu's Radha Vallabh Sampradaya, Chaitanya Mahaprabhu's Gaudiya Vaishnav Sampradaya, Kripalu Maharaj's Jagat Guru Kripalu Parishat and Nimabarkacharya's Nimbarka Sampradaya.

== Temples ==
- Sri Sri Mayapur Dham
- Sri Radha Rasbihari Ashtasakhi Temple, Vrindavan
- Sri Ashtasakhi Temple, Barsana

== See also ==
- Gopi
- Radha Krishna
- Ashtabharya
- Ashta Lakshmi
- Goloka
