= Premanand Maharaj =

Indian Hindu spiritual leader and ascetic (born 1971)

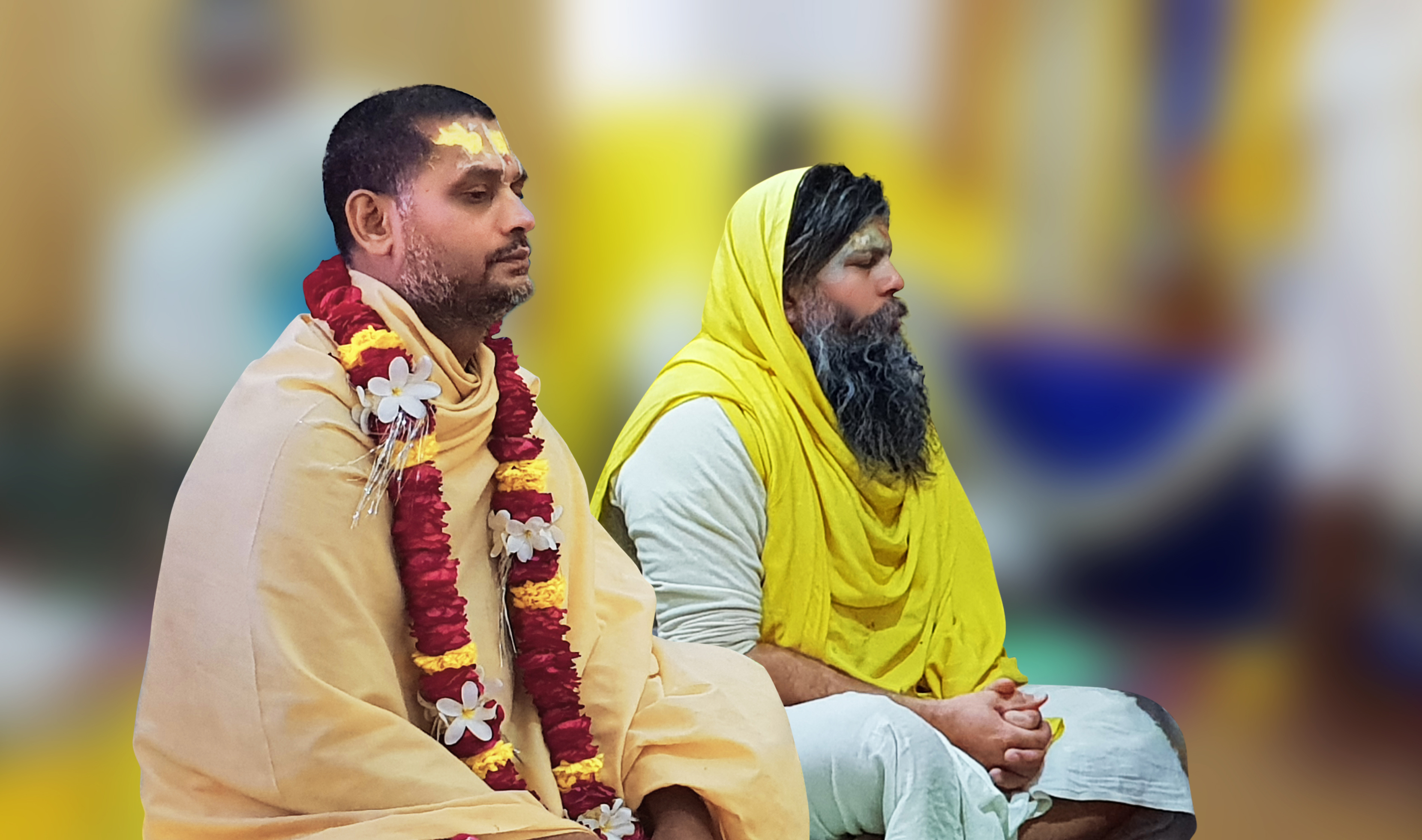
- Shri Hit Gaurangi Sharan Ji Maharaj (left) and Premanand Maharaj (right)

Personal life
- Born: Aniruddh Kumar Pandey; 1971 (age 54–55) Akhri village, Sarsaul, Kanpur district, Uttar Pradesh, India
- Parents: Shambhu Pandey (father); Rama Devi (mother)
- Region: Braj
- Known for: Spiritual discourses and teachings on bhakti, brahmacharya, and devotional practice
- Other names: Anandswaroop Brahmachari, Swami Anandashram
- Website: vrindavanrasmahima.com

Religious life
- Religion: Hinduism
- Temple: Shri Hit Radha Keli Kunj Ashram
- Sect: Radha Vallabh Sampradaya
- Teachers: Shri Hit Gaurangi Sharan Ji Maharaj
- Initiation: Radha Vallabh Sampradaya

Religious career
- Based in: Vrindavan, Uttar Pradesh, India
- Organization: Shri Hit Radha Keli Kunj Trust

Premanand Maharaj (born Aniruddh Kumar Pandey in 1971) is an Indian Hindu ascetic and spiritual leader based in Vrindavan, Uttar Pradesh. He was initiated into the Radha Vallabh Sampradaya, a Vaishnava tradition centred on devotion to Radha and Krishna. He gives spiritual discourses known as satsangs and participates in private spiritual discussions known as Ekantik Vartalap at Shri Hit Radha Keli Kunj in Vrindavan.

== Early life and background ==
Premanand Maharaj was born as Aniruddh Kumar Pandey into a Brahmin family in Akhri village of Sarsaul block in Kanpur district, Uttar Pradesh. His father was Shambhu Pandey and his mother was Rama Devi. His grandfather had taken sannyasa, while his father was devoted to religious practices. His elder brother regularly recited verses from the Srimad Bhagavatam at home.

He developed an interest in religious practice during childhood and began reciting prayers at a young age. While in the fifth grade, he began reading Shri Sukhsagar, a publication of Gita Press.

At the age of 13, he left his family home and travelled to Varanasi, where he began a life of religious renunciation. He spent time on the banks of the Ganges before later moving to Vrindavan.

== Spiritual journey ==
=== Asceticism in Varanasi ===
At the age of 13, Aniruddh Kumar Pandey left his home in Kanpur and travelled to Varanasi (Kashi), where he began a life of religious renunciation. He spent time on the banks of the Ganges and lived as an ascetic, engaging in meditation and religious practice.

He was initiated into naisthika brahmacharya and was given the name Anandswaroop Brahmachari. He later accepted sannyasa and was given the name Swami Anandashram.

During his years in Varanasi, he lived a simple life and relied on alms for food. He spent extended periods in meditation and solitude as part of his ascetic practice.

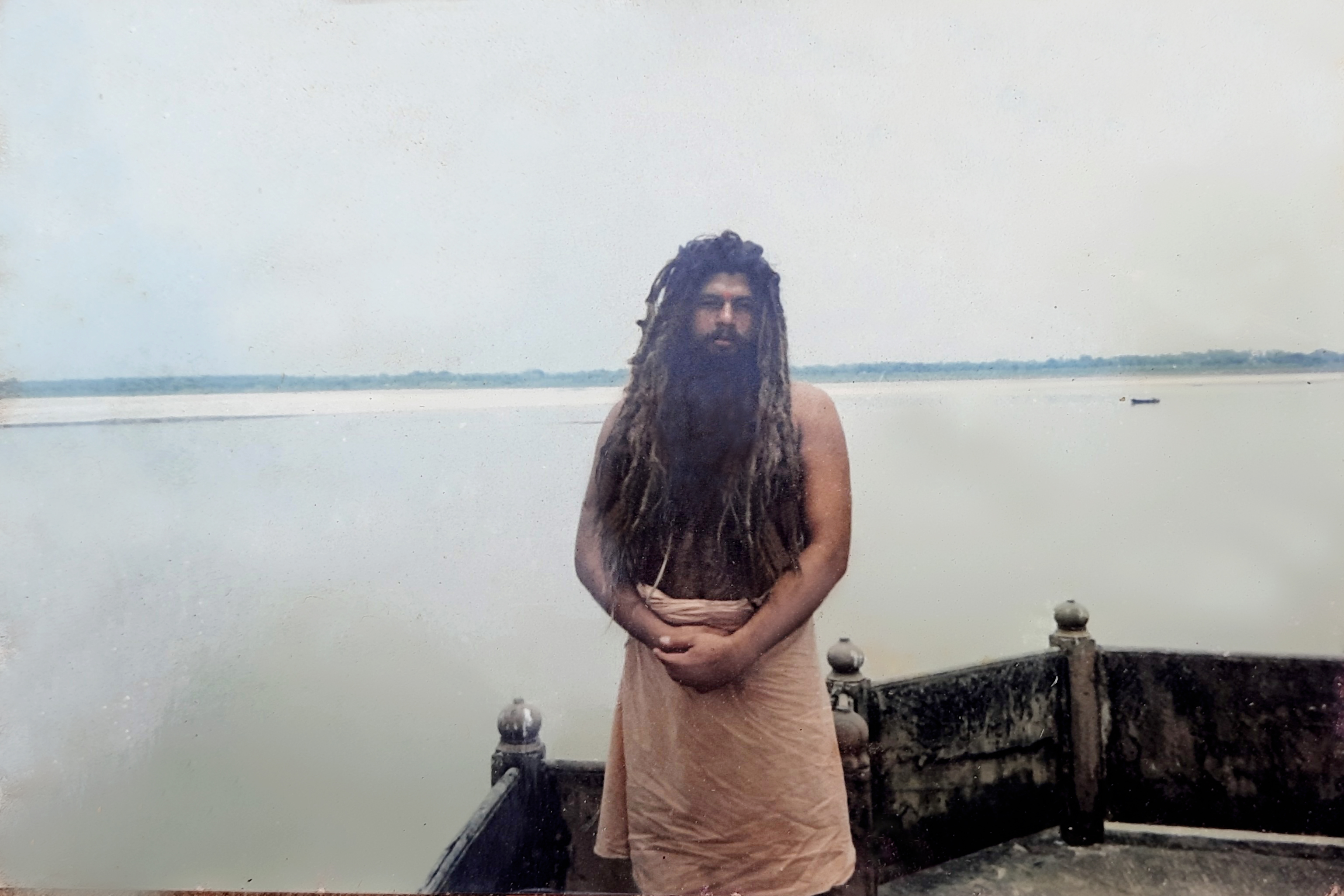
Premanand living as an ascetic in his youth

=== Relocation to Vrindavan ===
While living in Varanasi, he encountered a saint who encouraged him to attend a Raas Leela performance. He attended the performances for about a month before travelling by train to Mathura and then continuing to Vrindavan.

Upon arriving in Vrindavan, he undertook the Vrindavan Parikrama and visited the Bankey Bihari Temple. He later came into contact with the Shri Radha Vallabh Mandir, where he became associated with the Radha Vallabh Sampradaya.

=== Initiation into Radha Vallabh Sampradaya ===
He was initiated into the Radha Vallabh Sampradaya, a Vaishnava tradition associated with the 16th-century saint Hith Harivansh Mahaprabhu. The tradition places Radha at the centre of its devotional practice.

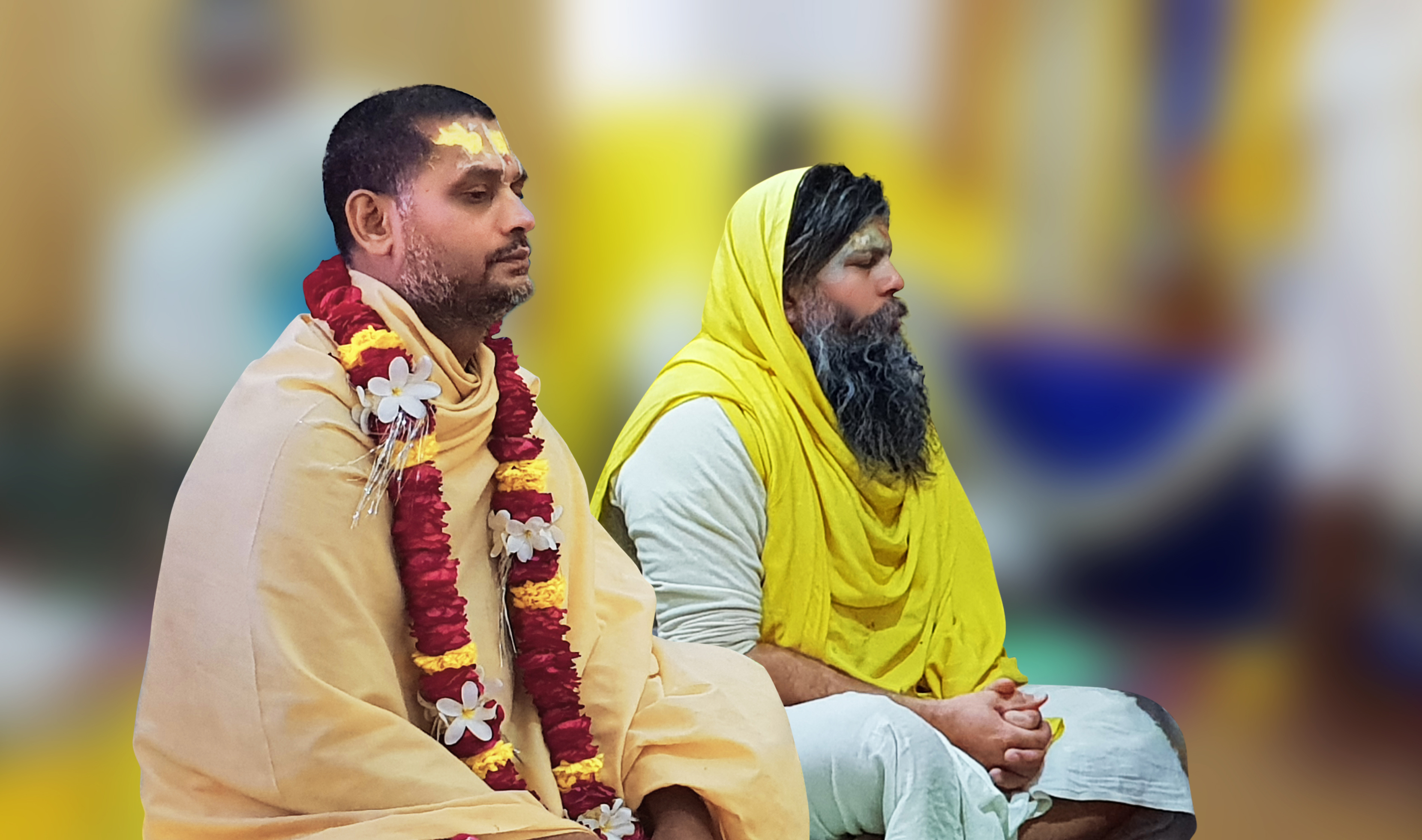
Premanand (right) with his guru, Shri Hit Gaurangi Sharan

He first received the Sharanagat Mantra from a Goswami of the Radha Vallabh Sampradaya. He subsequently received Nij Mantra diksha from Shri Hit Gaurangi Sharan Ji Maharaj, who became his spiritual teacher. Following his initiation, he came to be known as Shri Hit Premanand Govind Sharan.

== Ashram and operations ==
Premanand Maharaj is based at the Shri Hit Radha Keli Kunj Ashram at Varaha Ghat on the Parikrama Marg in Vrindavan. The ashram is associated with his spiritual discourses and devotional activities.

In 2016, he established the Shri Hit Radha Keli Kunj Trust, which undertakes welfare activities including support related to education and healthcare.

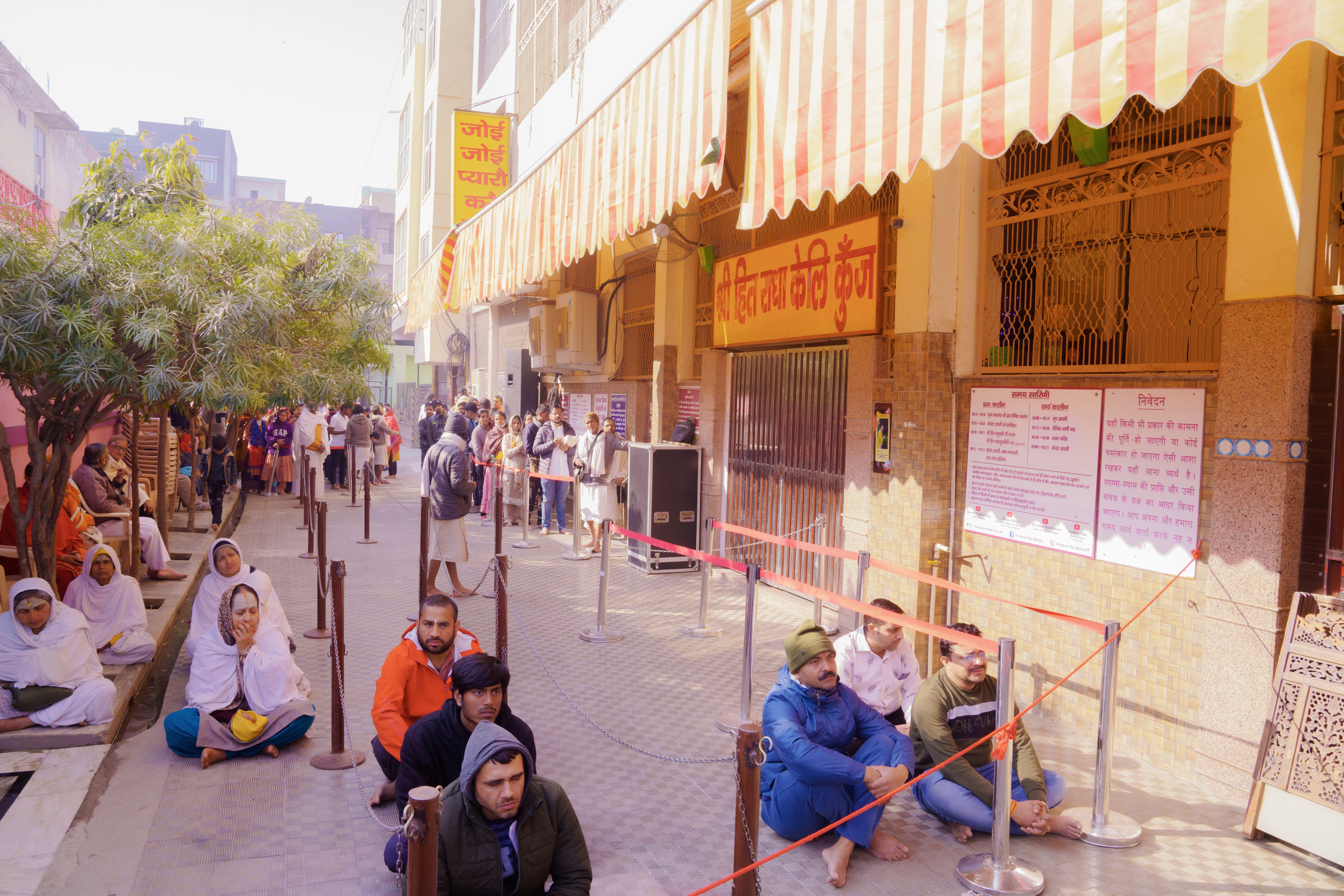
Shri Hit Radha Keli Kunj Ashram on the Parikrama Marg in Vrindavan

The ashram's published schedule includes a morning satsang led by Premanand Maharaj from 4:10 to 5:15 a.m. Ekantik Vartalap sessions allow devotees to meet him and discuss individual questions. Access is organised through a token system, with tokens provided free of charge.

The Shri Hit Radha Keli Kunj Trust undertakes charitable activities including the provision of food, clothing and medical assistance to disadvantaged and shelterless people, as well as support for saints.

In February 2025, the ashram issued an advisory warning against fraudulent activities carried out in its name. The advisory stated that the Shri Hit Radha Keli Kunj Ashram had no branches and did not sell land, flats, plots or buildings. It also stated that participation in Ekantik Vartalap, satsang, kirtan and Vani Path at the ashram was free of charge.

== Teachings and philosophy ==
His teachings are rooted in the devotional practices of the Radha Vallabh Sampradaya, with an emphasis on devotion to Radha and Krishna. His discourses cover devotional practice, personal conduct, self-discipline and the role of the guru in spiritual life.

A recurring element of his teaching is naam japa, involving the remembrance and chanting of the divine name. He presents devotional remembrance as a practice that can be incorporated into everyday life.

He also emphasises brahmacharya and self-discipline. In discussions directed towards younger audiences, he has presented celibacy as a means of maintaining personal discipline and supporting spiritual practice.

During Ekantik Vartalap sessions, he also addresses questions concerning Nishkam Karma (selfless action) and its application to everyday life.

== Spiritual accounts ==
In his public discourses, Premanand Maharaj has recounted experiences that he regards as significant to his spiritual journey.

While living as an ascetic at Assi Ghat in Varanasi, he described encountering a man whom he initially believed to be dead during heavy rain. He said that he approached the man, who was suffering from leprosy, and helped him. In his account, the man revealed himself to be the Hindu deity Shiva and instructed him to leave Varanasi and go to Vrindavan.

He has also recounted an encounter from his youth with an intoxicated man near the Ganges. According to his account, when he was about 18 or 19 years old, the man took him to a temple and asked him what the deity's image was made of. After learning that it was made of marble, the man contrasted it with the marble used for the temple floor, explaining that the stone used for the image had endured repeated cutting and blows before becoming an object of worship. Premanand said that he regarded the encounter as a lesson in enduring hardship and later remembered the man's words during difficult periods.

== Public presence and media ==
Premanand Maharaj has developed a substantial online following through recordings of his spiritual discourses. His satsangs and Ekantik Vartalap sessions are distributed through social media platforms including YouTube and Instagram. His YouTube channel, Bhajan Marg, publishes recordings of his discourses and question-and-answer sessions.

Several public figures have visited the Shri Hit Radha Keli Kunj Ashram in Vrindavan, including Virat Kohli, Anushka Sharma, Hema Malini, Ashutosh Rana and Elvish Yadav.

Virat Kohli and Anushka Sharma have visited the ashram on multiple occasions, with their visits receiving media coverage.

== Social views and reception ==
=== Comments on temple attire ===
In November 2024, during an Ekantik Vartalap at Shri Radha Keli Kunj, Premanand Maharaj was asked by a temple priest about women wearing short clothing in temples. He advised the priest to first correct his own drishti (way of looking at others) rather than confronting women about their clothing without being asked. He said that guidance on the matter could be given when someone specifically sought his advice.

=== 2025 remarks on relationships ===
In July 2025, Premanand Maharaj addressed questions concerning marriage and relationships during a spiritual discourse. He questioned whether people who had previously been involved with multiple partners could remain faithful in marriage and criticised live-in relationships.

The remarks drew criticism from social activists and women's organisations. Uttar Pradesh minister Om Prakash Rajbhar also condemned the remarks, while some religious figures expressed support for Premanand Maharaj's views.

In August 2025, a death threat against Premanand Maharaj was posted as a comment on Facebook following the controversy. The incident was reported to have come to the attention of the police, who began efforts to identify the person responsible.

== Health condition ==
Maharaj has been reported to have autosomal dominant polycystic kidney disease (ADPKD), a genetic disorder affecting the kidneys. The condition has resulted in complete kidney failure, and he has undergone dialysis for nearly two decades.

Several devotees have reportedly offered to donate a kidney to him. In August 2025, businessman Raj Kundra offered to donate one of his kidneys during a visit to the ashram. Premanand Maharaj declined the offer and told Kundra to remain healthy.

He has declined offers of kidney donation, stating that he did not want another person to undergo physical suffering or discomfort for his benefit. He has also said that he accepts his health condition as part of God's will.

== Selected publications ==
Several books containing his teachings and discourses have been published by Bhajan Marg Publications under the Shri Hit Radha Keli Kunj Trust.

- Brahmacharya: Kab, Kyon aur Kaise? (2025) – ISBN 978-81-980039-1-1
- Celibacy: When, Why, and How? (2025) – ISBN 978-81-980039-0-4
- Shri Hit Harivansh Charitamrit (2025) – ISBN 978-81-980039-4-2
- Spiritual Awakening (2025) – ISBN 978-81-971056-5-4
- 365 Divine Sutras: Hindi & English (2026) – ISBN 978-81-996765-1-0

== See also ==
- Hith Harivansh Mahaprabhu
- Radha Vallabh Sampradaya
- Vrindavan
- Vaishnavism
