= Lalita Sakhi =

Hindu goddess, Companion of Radha Krishna

Lalita
- Member of Ashtasakhi
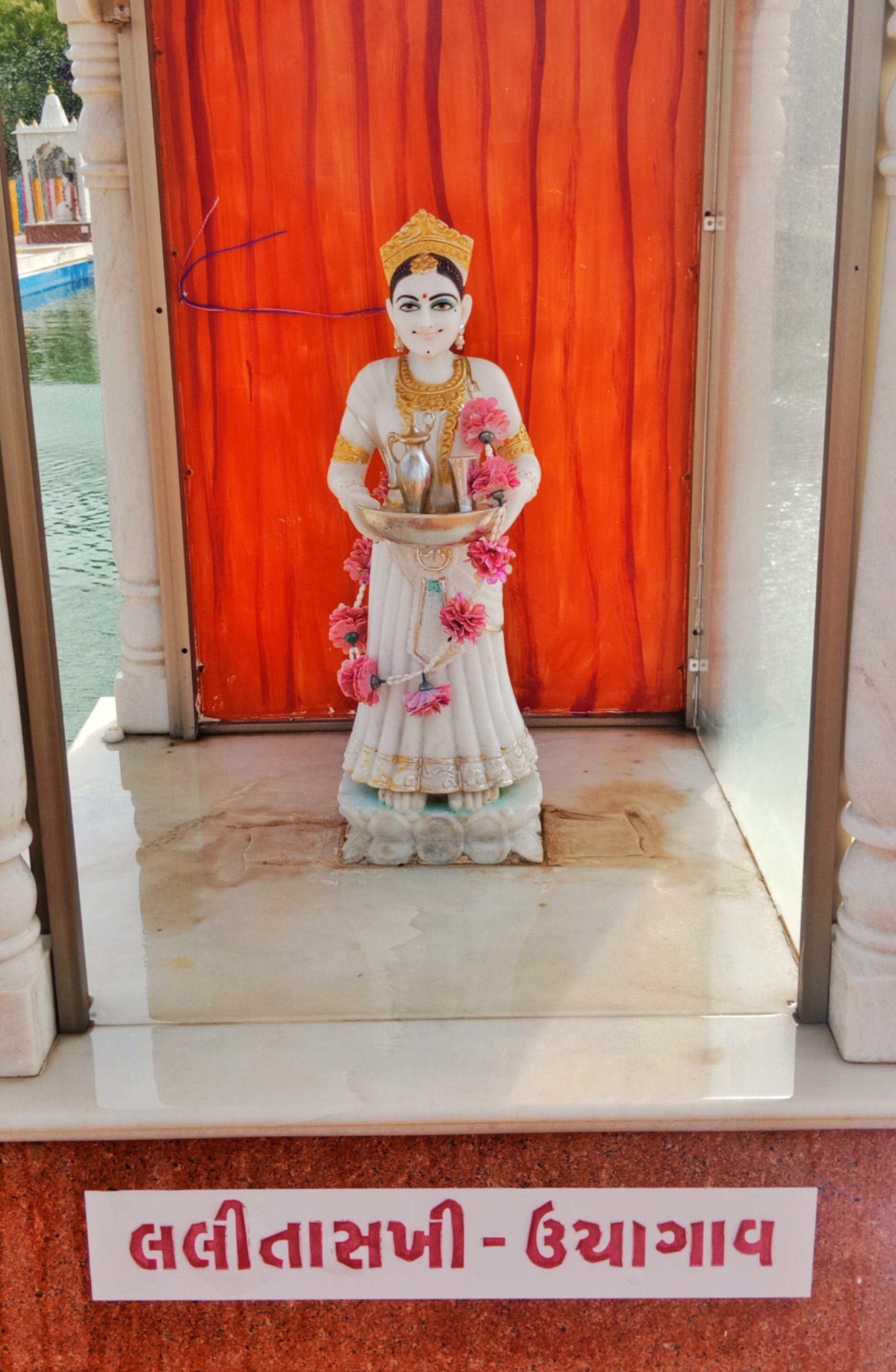
- Idol of Lalita Sakhi, one of the close associates of Radha Krishna at Shri Govardhan Parvat Temple, Anjar, Gujarat
- Other names: Lalita Gopi, Lalita Sakhi
- Devanagari: ललिता
- Sanskrit transliteration: Lālitā
- Venerated in: Radha Vallabh Sampradaya, Nimbarka Sampradaya, Gaudiya Vaishnavism, Pushtimarg, Haridasi Sampradaya
- Affiliation: Gopi; Avatar of Radha; Krishnaism
- Abode: Goloka, Unchagaon, Vrindavan
- Gender: Female
- Region: Braj region
- Temple: Shri Lalita Sakhi Temple, Unchagaon
- Festivals: Lalita Saptami, Lathmar Holi, Sharad Purnima, Kartik Purnima

Genealogy
- Consort: Krishna
- Dynasty: Yaduvamsha-Chandravamsha

Translations of Lalitā
- Sanskrit: ललिता
- Bengali: ললিতা
- Hindi: ललिता
- Kannada: ಲಲಿತಾ
- Kashmiri: لَلِتا
- Malayalam: ലളിത
- Marathi: ललिता
- Odia: ଲଲିତା
- Punjabi: ਲਲਿਤਾ
- Telugu: లలితా
- Urdu: للِتا
- Gujarati: લલિતા

Lalita (Sanskrit: ललिता, IAST: Lalitā), also commonly called Lalita Sakhi, is a Hindu goddess and one of the most prominent associates of the divine couple Radha Krishna. In many Vaishnaite traditions and literatures, she is revered as the gopi (milkmaid) of the Braj region and is mentioned as the chief of Ashtasakhi, the eight closest eternal companions of Radha and Krishna.

Lalita is considered as the expansion of Radha and the consort of Krishna. Unchagaon, near Barsana, is considered as the birthplace of Lalita in Dvapara Yuga while Goloka is mentioned as her spiritual abode. Her birth anniversary is celebrated annually on the occasion of Lalita Saptami in Braj, which falls one day before the festival of Radhashtami.

== Life and legends ==
Lalita is revered as the eldest gopi among Ashtasakhi and is described as 27 days older than goddess Radha. Lalita was born to Visoka (father) and Saradi (mother) in Unchagaon, near Barsana.

According to the scriptures, it is the duty of Lalita to arrange the meetings and different pastimes of Radha and Krishna smoothly in Dvapara Yuga. She is the integral part of many pastimes of the divine couple including Raslila, Radha Krishna Vivah lila and Lathmar Holi.

According to Brahma Vaivarta Purana and Garga Samhita, when Krishna left Vrindavan, all the Ashtasakhi, headed by Lalita left their villages and accompanied Radha to Kadli forest.

Once the 100 years of separation was over for Radha Krishna, Krishna came back to Braj and met all the Ashtasakhi and Radha in the Kadli forest. There Krishna summoned a huge divine chariot and took Radha, all the gopis including Lalita and residents of Braj, back to their celestial abode Goloka.

== Literature and symbolism ==
Lalita gopi was mentioned within multiple Vaishnavism scriptures. In some scriptures, she was mentioned as the gopi or chief of Ashtasakhi while in others, she is described as the closest associate of Radha Krishna. Some of the common scriptures with her mention are - Garga Samhita, Padma Purana, Narad Purana and Brahma Vaivarta Purana.

In Shaktism, Lalita gopi and other Ashtasakhi are considered as the embodiment of the Ashta Siddhis which are – Aṇimā, Mahima, Garima, Laghima, Prāpti, Prākāmya, Iṣiṭva, and Vaśitva.

== Worship ==
Lalita gopi is worshiped in many traditions including – Radha Vallabh Sampradaya, Gaudiya Vaishnavism, Nimbarka Sampradaya, Pushtimarga Sampradaya, Jagadguru Kripalu Parishat and Haridasi Sampradaya.

=== Hymns ===
- Shri Lalita Ashtakam by Rupa Gosvami
- Shri Lalita Dhyan Mantra in Skanda Purana

== Temples ==
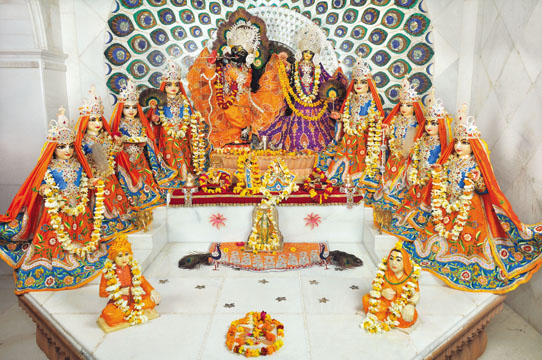
Ashtasakhi with Radha Krishna at Sri Radha Rasbihari Ashtasakhi Temple, Vrindavan

The main temple of Lalita is situated in her birth place, where she is worshiped with Krishna as his consort. The temple is called Shri Lalita Sakhi temple, Unchagaon. She is also venerated in other temples including Shri Radha Madan Mohan Temple, Vrindavan, in Vrindavan and Shri Radha Madan Mohan Temple, Karauli, Shri Ashtasakhi temple, Barsana.

== Incarnation ==
In Kaliyuga, Swami Haridas, the popular saint and musician of Vrindavan is said to be the incarnation of Lalita. He manifested the idol of Banke Bihari in Nidhivan, Vrindavan.

== Adaptation ==
In popular culture, Lalita Sakhi is portrayed by artists in TV series.

- In Ramanand Sagar's 1993 series Shri Krishna, Lalita was portrayed by Papiya Sengupta.
- In the 2018 series RadhaKrishn, Lalita was portrayed by Priya Thanki.

== See also ==
- Meera
- Swami Haridas
- Goloka
