= Radha Vallabh Temple, Vrindavan =

Hindu temple dedicated to Radha Krishna in Vrindavan, India

Shri Radha Vallabh Temple
- Shri Radha Vallabhlalji Temple
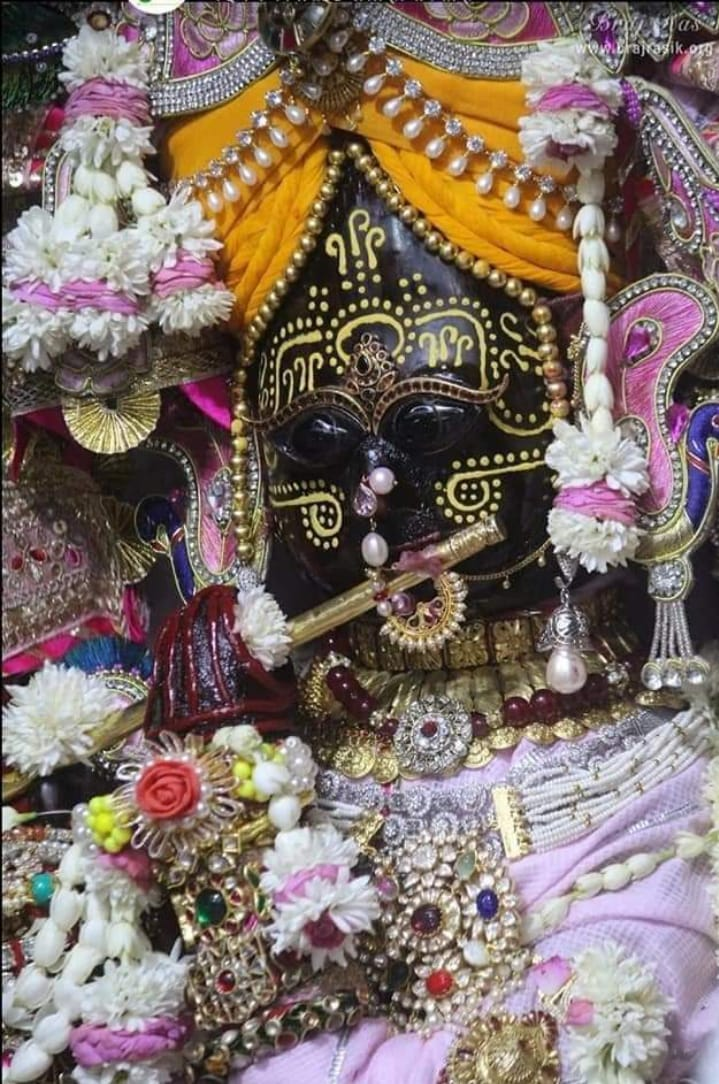
- Central deity of Radha Vallabh Temple

- Location in Uttar Pradesh

Religion
- Affiliation: Hinduism
- District: Mathura
- Deity: Radha Krishna (Radha Vallabh)
- Festivals: Radhashtami, Janmashtami, Holi, Sharad Purnima, Hitotsav

Location
- Location: Vrindavan
- State: Uttar Pradesh
- Country: India
- Coordinates: 27.5812°N 77.6920°E

Architecture
- Creator: Sundardas Bhatnagar
- Completed: 1585 A.D

Website
- https://www.radhavallabhmandir.com/index.php

Shri Radha Vallabh Temple, also called Shri Radha Vallabhlal ji Temple is a historic temple in the city of Vrindavan, Mathura district, Uttar Pradesh, India. The temple is dedicated to Hindu deities Radha Krishna. The temple belongs to Radha Vallabh Sampradaya and was constructed in 16th century under the guidance of Vrindavan saint Hith Harivansha Mahaprabhu.

The central deity of the temple is Krishna who is worshiped under the name of Shri Radha Vallabh which means the consort of Radha. Alongside Krishna, a crown is placed which signifies the presence of goddess Radha.

== History ==
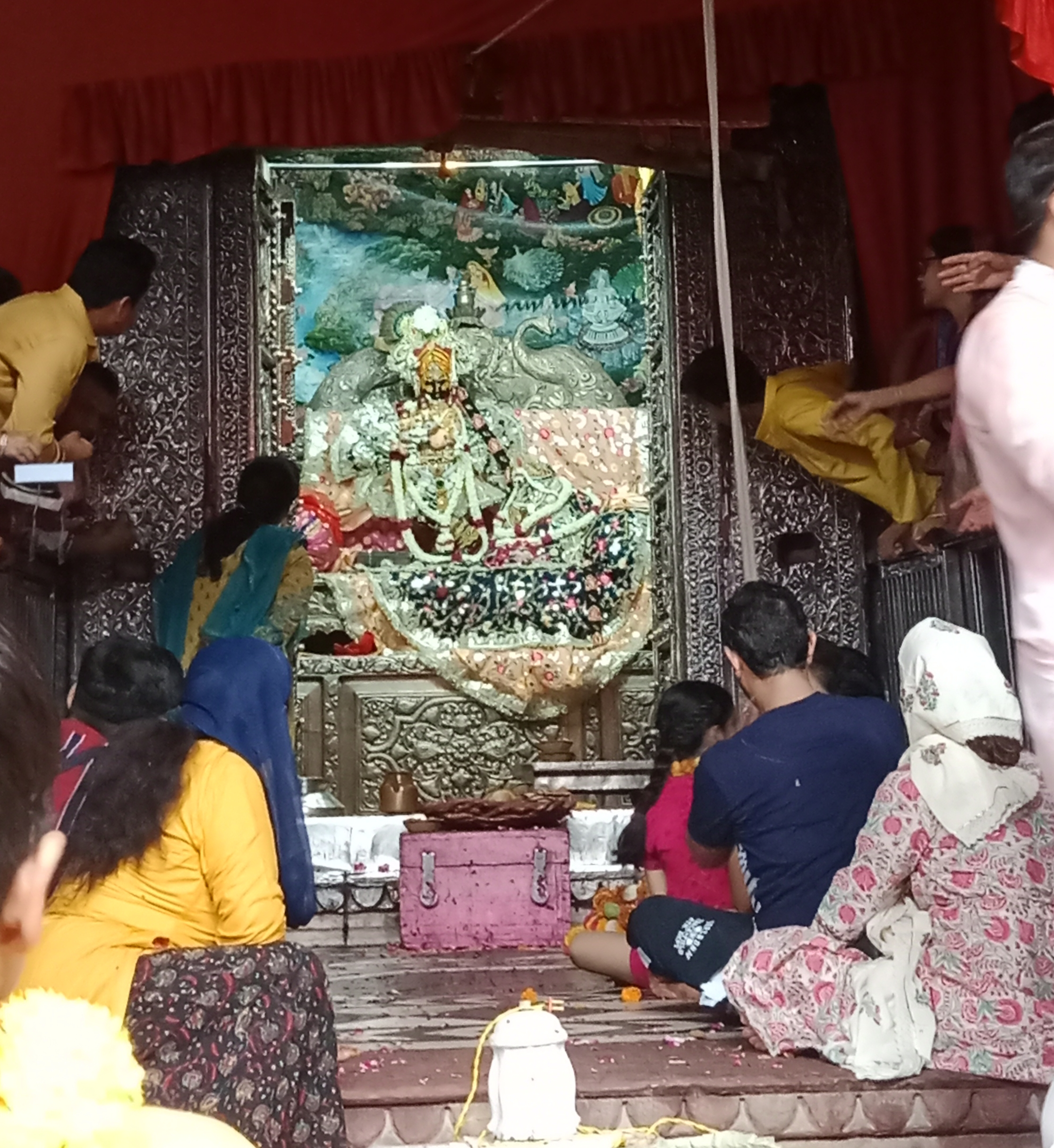
Inside premises of Radha Vallabh temple, Vrindavan

Old Radhavallabh Temple, presently known as Hith Mandir in Vrindavan, was constructed in 1585 A.D by Sundardas Bhatnagar, a disciple of Vanachandra, the son of Hith Harivansh Mahaprabhu. At that time, Sundardas Bhatnagar of Deoband was employed by Abdul Rahim Khankhana, the chief head at Akbar's court. Through Abdul Rahim Khankhana, Sundardas Bhatnagar not only got the Royal permission to use red sandstone for the construction of temple, which was used only for construction of imperial buildings, royal palaces and forts at that time but also received monetary grant for this temple from Akbar. Descendants of Sundardas Bhatnagar at Deoband still have the temple documents with them.

It is said that King Maan Singh first decided to construct this temple. But on hearing a legend that whosoever construct this temple would die within a year, he backed out. Though later the legend did come true. Sundardas Bhatnagar who constructed the temple died within a year, soon after the construction of the temple was complete.

== Legend ==
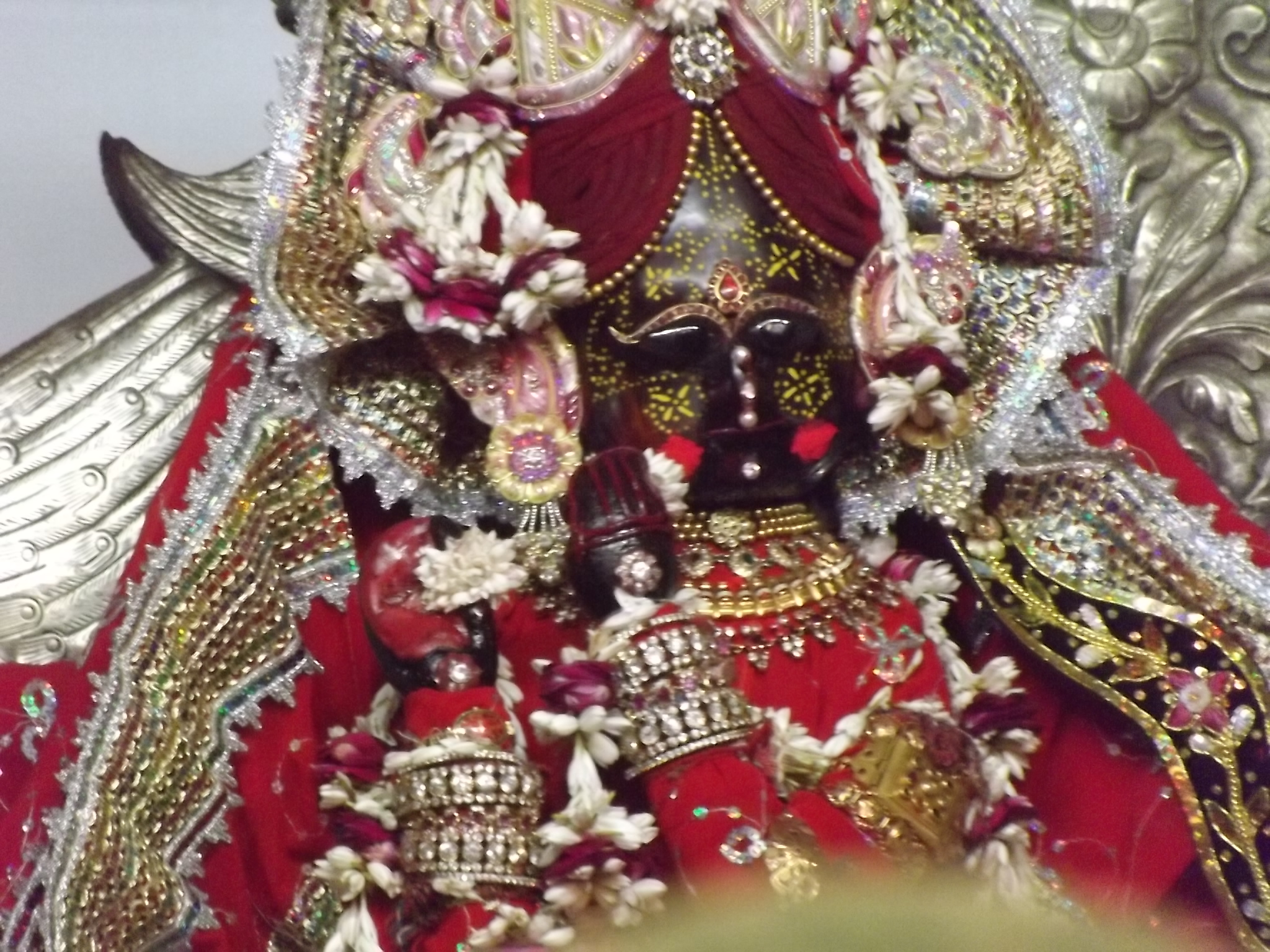
Radha Vallabhlal idol

According to popular legend, the deity Radhavallabh was never made by any sculptor. The deity was given to a devotee named Atmadev by Shiva himself because of his arduous devotion and prayers. The Hith Harivansh Mahaprabhu lived 31 years in place called Devavan. In the 32nd year of his age, he left for Vrindavan. On his way to Vrindavan, he was ordered by goddess Radha herself to marry the daughters of Atmadev and took the idol of Radha Vallabhji to Vrindavan with them. As ordered, Hith Harivansh Mahaprabhu married the daughters of Atmadev and Atmadev gifted the idol of Radhavallabh ji to his daughters and Harivansh Mahaprabhu on their marriage.

== Architecture ==
Shri Radha Vallabh Temple was situated near Gotam Nagar on the cliff near Bankey Bihari temple. This stands out due to its striking architecture and magnificence decor. Constructed in 1585, the Radha Vallabh temple is one of the oldest and long-living temples, majestically built using red sandstones at a time when they were used for building only high palaces, imperial buildings and royal forts. The wall of the temple is 10 feet thick and are pierced in 2 stages.

== Festivals ==
The Radha Vallabh temple is famous for its colorful and vibrant festivals. The major festivals of the temple are -

- Hitotsav - It is a 11 days long festival commemorating the founder of Radha-vallabha tradition, Hith Harivansh Mahaprabhu.
- Radhashtami - It is a 9 days long grand festival which celebrated the birth anniversary of Goddess Radha, the guru (mentor) of Radha-vallabha tradition.
- Krishna Janmashtami - The festival celebrates the birth anniversary of Krishna, the consort of Radha.
- Vyahlu Utsav - This festival celebrates the wedding ceremony of Radha Krishna. This festival is locally known as Byahovala of the Lord and is also called Manoratha. The temple is flocked with devotees on such ceremony and becomes the center of prime attraction for such different rituals.

The other annual festivals of the temple include - Holi, Diwali, Sharad Purnima, Dussehra, Jhulan Utsav, Phool Banglas (Floral Archades), Sanjhi Utsav and Patotsava.

== Timings ==
The time zone (UTC+05:30) observed through India by the priest.

Morning - 05:00 am to 12:00 pm.

Evening - 06:00 pm to 09:00 pm.

== Nearby attractions ==
- Bankey Bihari Temple
- Nidhivan, Vrindavan
- Radha Raman Temple
- Radha Damodar temple, Vrindavan
- Radha Madan Mohan Temple, Vrindavan

== See also ==
- Hinduism in India
- List of Hindu temples in India
- List of Monuments of National Importance in Agra circle
- Radha Kund
- Radha Krishna
- Kusum Sarovar
- Radha Vallabh Sampradaya
- Hith Harivansha Mahaprabhu
- Radha Krishna Vivah Sthali, Bhandirvan
