= Sarsaul =

- town
- Location in Uttar Pradesh, India Sarsaul (India)
- Coordinates: 26°17′0″N 80°29′19″E
- Country: India
- State: Uttar Pradesh
- District: Kanpur
- Founder: not known

Languages
  - Official: Hindi
- Time zone: UTC+5:30 (IST)
- PIN: 209402
- Vehicle registration: UP-78
- Coastline: 0 kilometres (0 mi)
- Website: up.gov.in

Sarsaul is a town in Kanpur district in the state of Uttar Pradesh, India. Sarsaul is a Development Block in Kanpur nagar tehsil and comes under Kanpur metropolitan area.

Sarsaul is well connected by road. National Highway 19 (India) passes through Sarsaul connecting it to Kanpur city and Allahabad. Sarsaul has a railway station on New Delhi-Howrah railroad. The nearest airport is Kanpur Airport. Now The kanpur central jail is going to be constructed near sarsaul.

== Notable people ==
- Premanand Govind Sharan Ji Maharaj, an Indian Hindu guru. He belongs to the Radhavallabh Sect. This Sanātanī spiritual guru was born in 1969 in the Akhri village, Sarsaul. He is one of the great devotee of Radha Ladli Ju and Krishna Ju.
