= Radha caste =

The Radha are a Hindu caste found in the state of Uttar Pradesh in India. They are followers of the Radha Vallabh sect of Hinduism, who have evolved into a distinct caste. According to their tradition, the community are by origin from Barsana. Radha is the consort of the god Krishna and the followers of this tradition are the devotees of Radha.

The Radha caste is further divided into a number of exogamous clans such as the Kathak Vansh and Shyamvedi Gaur, the former have their concentration in Ayodhya, whereas the Shyamvedi Gaur are found mainly in Mathura.
