= Gopi =

Milkmaids of Braj associated with Hindu god Krishna

Gopis
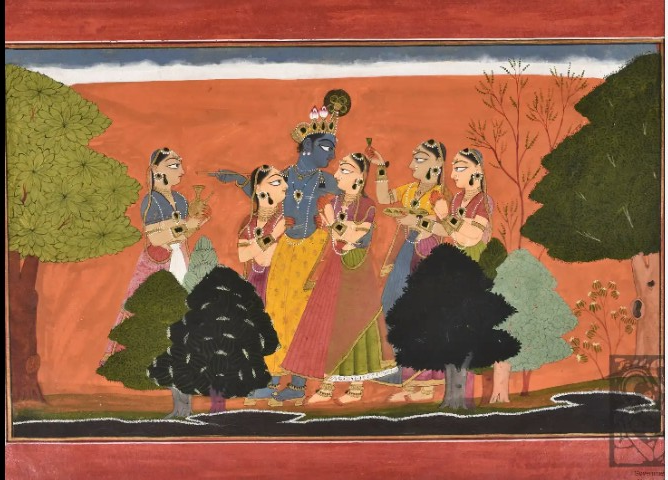
- Krishna with gopis in the forest of Braj, a Pahari painting by Manaku, c. 1730
- Other names: Krishnasakhi, Krishnapreyasi
- Devanagari: गोपी
- Sanskrit transliteration: Gopi
- Venerated in: Radha Vallabh Sampradaya, Nimbarka Sampradaya, Gaudiya Vaishnavism, Pushtimarg
- Affiliation: Avatar of Radha, Krishnaism, Vaishnavism
- Abode: Goloka, Vrindavan, Barsana
- Texts: Brahma Vaivarta Purana, Garga Samhita, Gita Govinda, Bhagavata Purana, Tiruppavai
- Gender: Female
- Region: Braj region
- Temple: Ashtasakhi Temple in Vrindavan
- Festivals: Sharad Purnima, Kartik Purnima, Holi, Lathmar Holi

Genealogy
- Born: Braj
- Consort: Krishna

Gopi (Sanskrit: गोपी, IAST: Gopī), also called Gopika, is a term in Hinduism commonly used to refer to the group of milkmaids of the Braj region in India. They are regarded by Hindus as the consorts and devotees of Krishna and are venerated for their unconditional love and devotion (Bhakti) to him as described in Bhagavata Purana and other Puranic literature. Gopis are often considered as the manifestations or expansions of Radha, the chief consort of Krishna. The Raslila of the gopis with Krishna has inspired various traditional performance art forms and literatures.

As a masculine given name of Indian origin, it is used as a short form of the name Gopala Krishna, meaning "Krishna, the protector of cows" or "Krishna the cowherd". While traditionally used for both genders, it's more commonly used as a male name, especially within the Indian diaspora and communities.

According to Indian philosopher Jiva Goswami, gopis are considered as the eternal beloved and manifestations of the internal spiritual potency of Krishna. Among the gopis, Radha is the chief gopi and is the personification of the bliss potency (hladini shakti) of Krishna. She alone manifests the stage of mahabhava, or supreme love for Krishna, and holds a place of particularly high reverence and importance in a number of religious traditions.

== Etymology ==
Gopi (गोपी) is a Sanskrit word originating from the word Gopa. In Hinduism, the name Gopika or Gopi is especially used to refer the milkmaids of Braj region. The word Gopis in the plural refers to the group of cowherd women who possess devotion toward Krishna. When it is used in the singular ("Gopi"), it generally refers to Radha, who was the Krishna's favourite gopi.

== Prominent gopis ==
The prominent gopis of Vrindavan are total 108 in numbers. They share the eternal intimate friendship with Radha Krishna. No one can equal or exceed the love they bear for the divine couple. Out of 108 gopis, the primary eight gopis are considered as the foremost of Krishna's devotees after goddess Radharani who is considered as the chief of gopis. Their names are as follows:

- Radha (Chief gopi, Krishna's favourite)
- Lalita
- Vishakha
- Champakalata
- Chitra
- Tungavidya
- Indulekha
- Rangadevi
- Sudevi

All the eight primary gopis are together called as the Ashtasakhi's (eight friends) of Radha and Krishna.

== Unconditional love ==
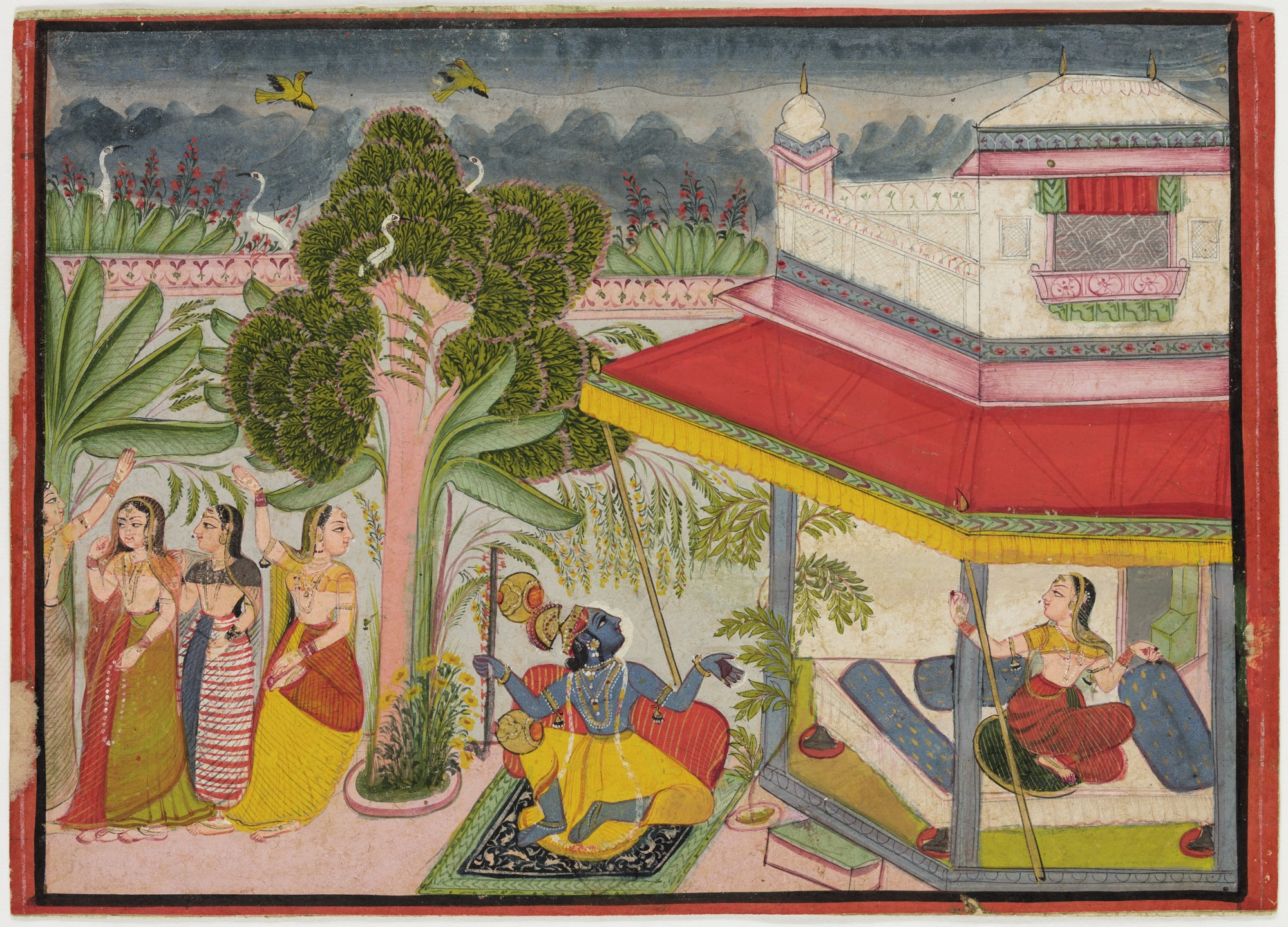
Radha Krishna with gopis

According to Hindu Vaishnava theology, the stories concerning the gopis are said to exemplify Suddha-bhakti which is described as 'the highest form of unconditional love for God (Krishna). Their spontaneous and unwavering devotion is described in depth in the later chapters of the Bhagavata Purana, within Krishna's Vrindavan pastimes and also in the stories of the sage Uddhava.

For Vaishnava traditions, the most important representation of the gopis' love and devotion for Krishna is a story in the Bhagavata Purana (10.29-33) by the name of Rasa Lila Panchadhyaya, which translates as "the five chapters on the story of the rasa dance". The bhakti or devotion that the gopis express in this story is believed by the Chaitanya tradition to exemplify the highest form of bhakti. In the story, Krishna's flute music attracts the gopis' attention, making them leave behind their families and homes so that they can enjoy devotion of Krishna:

Upon hearing that sweet music,

their passion for him swelling,

The young women of Braj whose

minds were captured by Krishna,

Unaware of one another,

ran off toward the place

Where their beloved was waiting,

with their earrings swinging wildly (Bhagavata Purana 10.29.4)

== Gallery ==
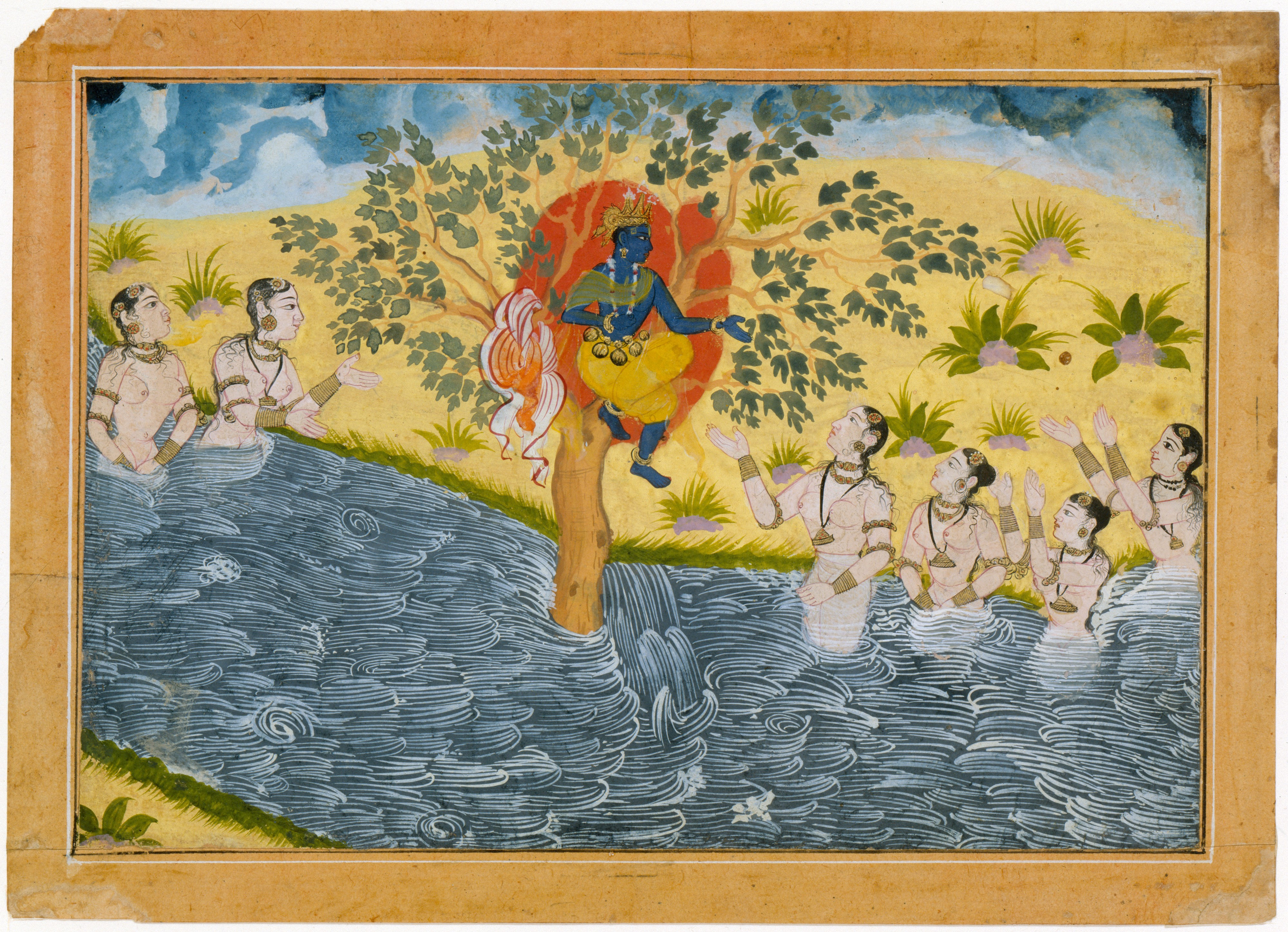
1610 painting of Krishna stealing clothes of Gopis

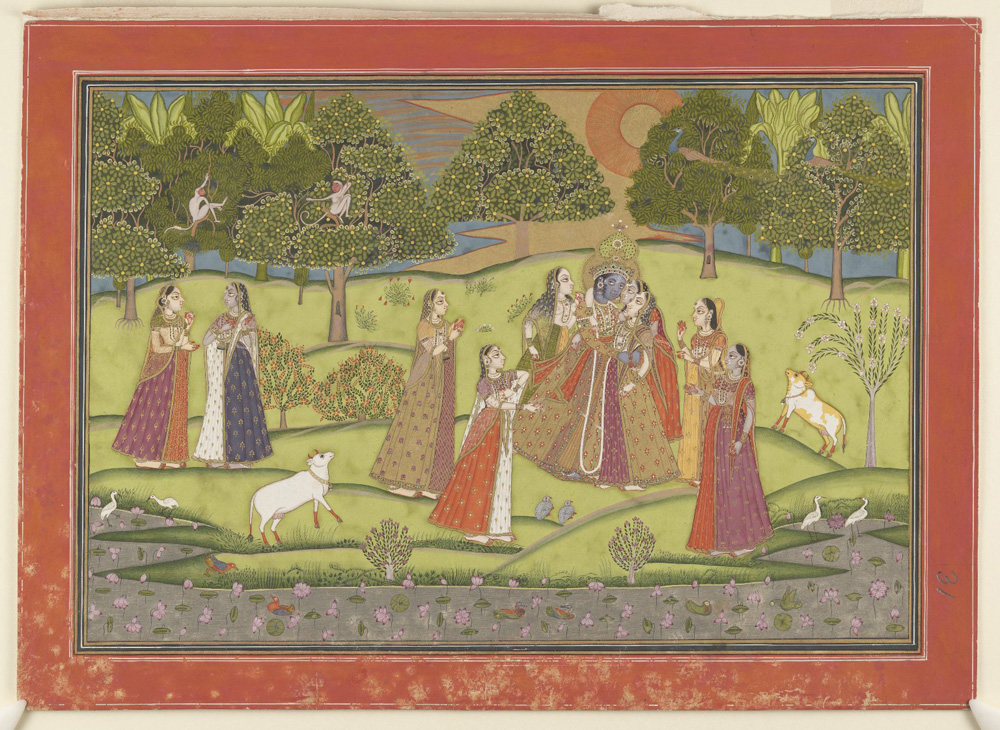
Krishna and Gopis, 18th century watercolour in the Bodleian Library

19th century Rajasthan painting depicting Krishna and Gopis

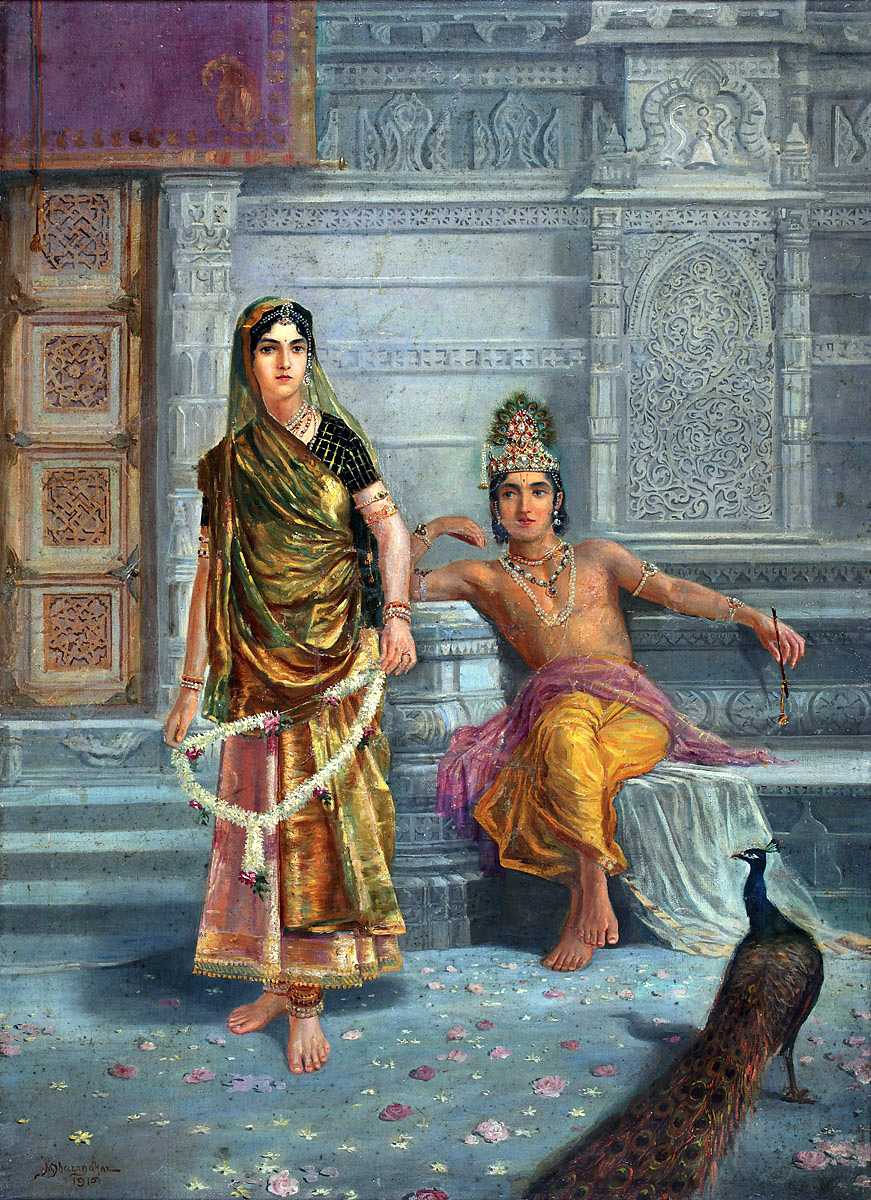
Gopika Radha with Gopal Krishna, a 1915 painting

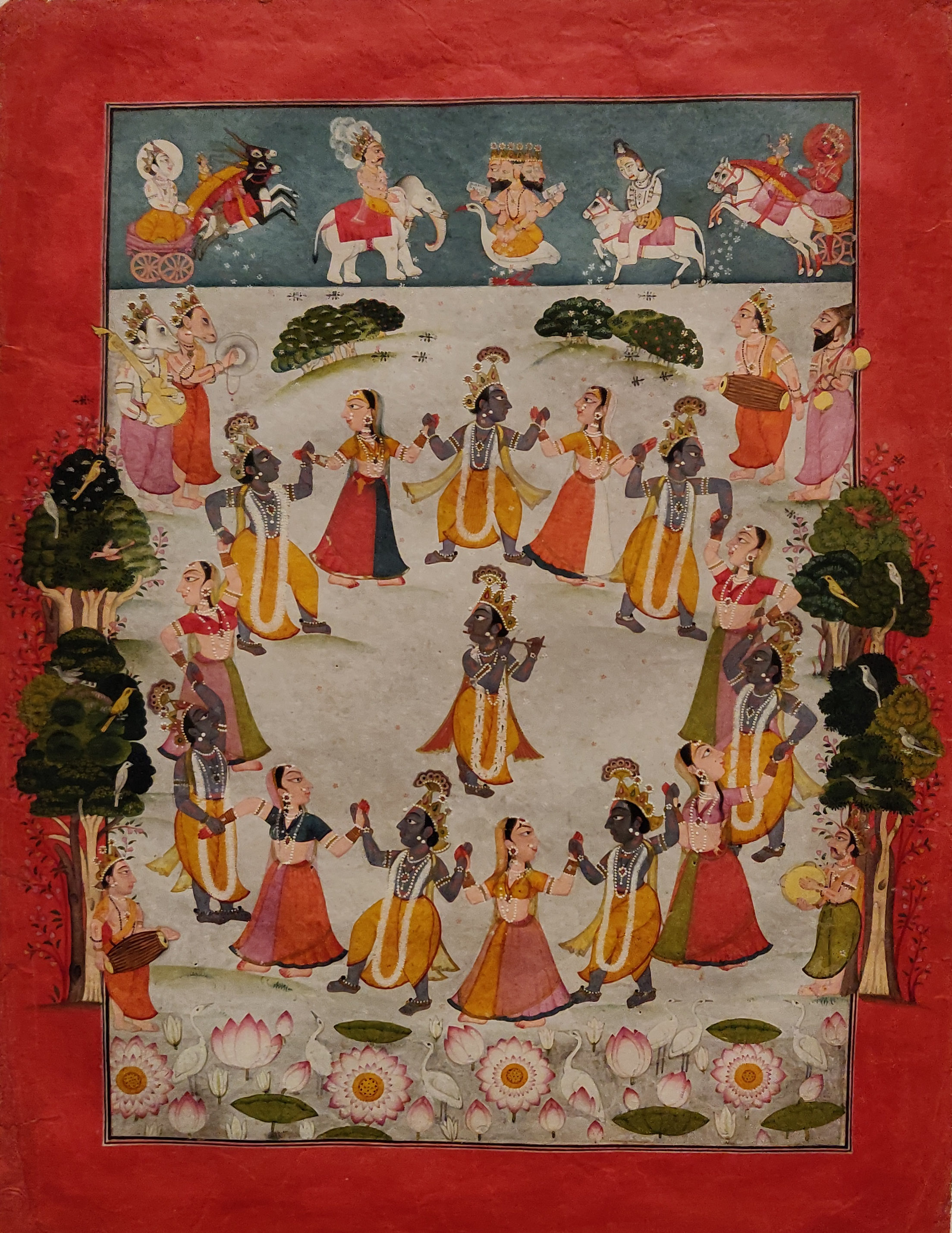
Raslila of Krishna with Radha and gopis

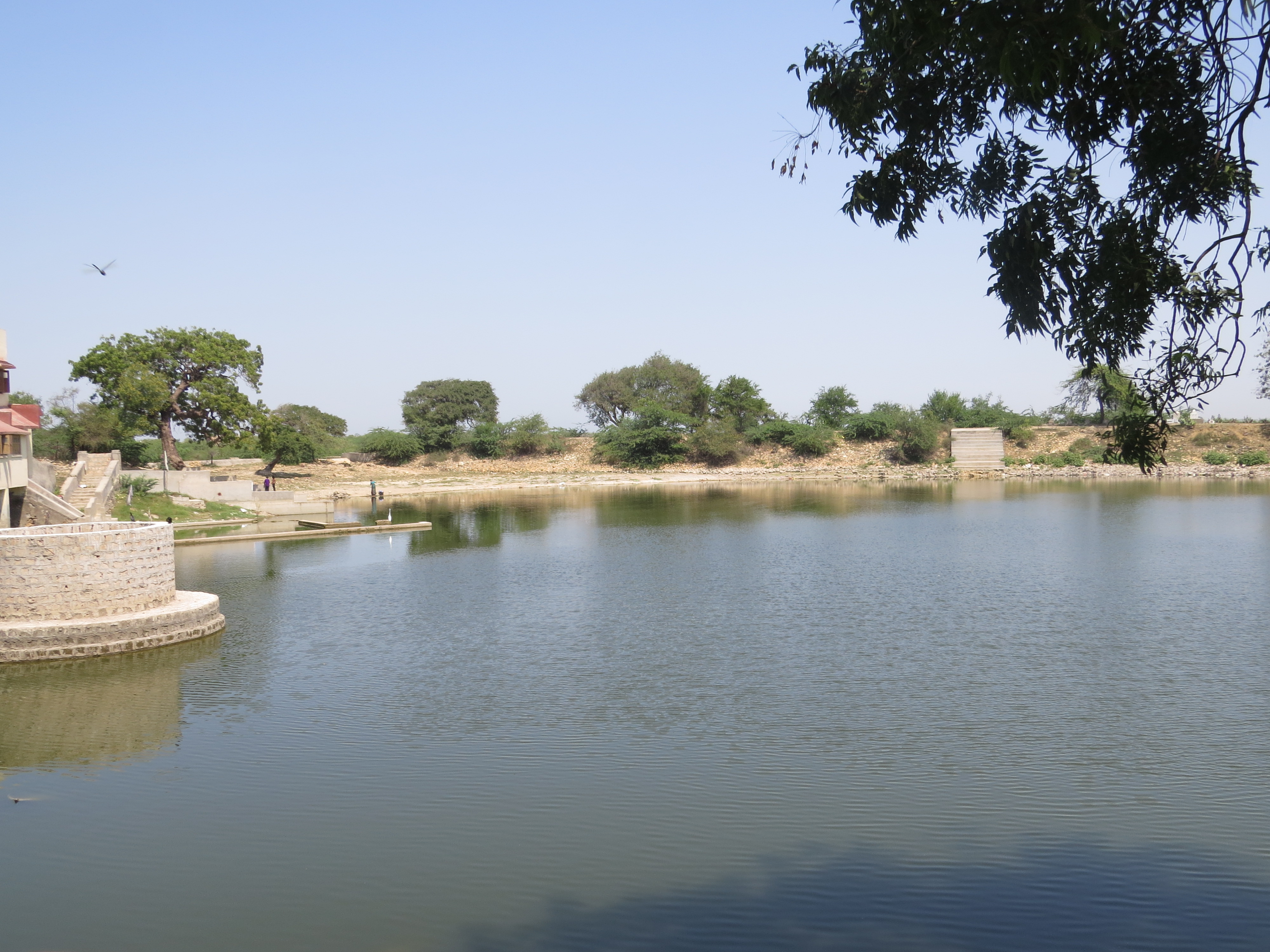
Gopi Talab dedicated to gopis in Dwarka

== See also ==
- Ashtasakhi
- Raslila
- Chaitanya Mahaprabhu
- Gita Govinda
- Lalita Sakhi
