= Mahaprabhu =

Mahaprabhu (Sanskrit: महाप्रभु, romanized: Mahāprabhu, lit. 'Great Lord') is a Sanskrit-language honorific. It may refer to:

- Jagannath, a Hindu deity
- Vallabha (1479–1531), founder of the Pushtimarg sect
- Chaitanya Mahaprabhu (1486–1534), founder of the Bengali Gaudiya Vaishnavite school of Hinduism
- Hith Harivansh Mahaprabhu (1509–1552), founder of the Radha Vallabh Sampradaya
- Mahāprabhu, chief god of the Bonda people of Orissa, India
- Mahaprabhu (film), a 1996 Indian Tamil-language masala film
