= Jai Kishan (disambiguation) =

Jai Kishan may refer to:

== People ==
- Jai Kishan
- Jai Kishan Das
- Jai Kishan Sahu
- Jai Kishan Kakubhai Shroff
- Shankar–Jaikishan
- Jaikishan Kaku Bhai Shroff

== Other ==
- Jai Kishan High School, Bargaon
