= Umashankar Kushwaha =

Indian politician

Member of Uttar Pradesh Legislative Assembly
- In office 2002–2007
- Constituency: Ghazipur Sadar Assembly constituency

Personal details
- Born: Uttar Pradesh
- Party: Bahujan Samaj Party
- Spouse: Urmila Kushwaha

Umashankar Kushwaha is an Indian politician, who was elected to Uttar Pradesh Legislative Assembly from Ghazipur Sadar Assembly constituency. He was associated with Bahujan Samaj Party. He was elected to Uttar Pradesh Legislative Assembly in the general elections of 2002 for the first time.

He was born to Ram Prasad Kushwaha on 1 June 1957 in Ghazipur district of Uttar Pradesh at a place called Parsadpur Chhawni Line. He moved to Gorakhpur University for his master's degree and also completed his degree of Bachelor of Education. On 13 February 1988, he was married to Urmila Kushwaha. They had one son and two daughters together from this marriage.

Kushwaha joined state government service before entering into politics. From 1994 to 1996, he served as the member of state cooperative society for buying and selling of agricultural products.In 2002, he ran for the state assembly polls and was elected as a candidate of Bahujan Samaj Party, becoming a legislator for the first time. In this election, he defeated Shri Rajendra of Communist Party of India. In 2003, he was made a member of Committee on Petition of Uttar Pradesh Legislative Assembly.

Kushwaha has also served as the chairman of Uttar Pradesh Cooperative Bank. In later part of his political career, he left Bahujan Samaj Party to join Bharatiya Janata Party. In 2019, he left BJP accusing it of neglecting the cause of Other Backward Castes. He rejoined Bahujan Samaj Party in the meantime.
