= Ghazipur Sadar Assembly constituency =

Constituency of the Uttar Pradesh legislative assembly in India

Coordinates: 25.80°N 83.33°E

Ghazipur Sadar
- Constituency No. 375 for the Uttar Pradesh Legislative Assembly

Constituency details
- Country: India
- Region: North India
- State: Uttar Pradesh
- District: Ghazipur
- Reservation: None

Member of Legislative Assembly
- 18th Uttar Pradesh Legislative Assembly
- Incumbent Jai Kishan Sahu
- Party: Samajwadi Party
- Elected year: 2022

Ghazipur Sadar is a constituency of the Uttar Pradesh Legislative Assembly covering the city of Ghazipur Sadar in the Ghazipur district of Uttar Pradesh, India.

Ghazipur Sadar is one of five assembly constituencies in the Ghazipur Lok Sabha constituency.2008, this assembly constituency is numbered 375 amongst 403 constituencies.

== Members of Legislative Assembly ==
Year	Member	Party
1957	Pabbar Ram	Communist Party of India
1962	Krishna Nand Rai	Indian National Congress
1967	Pabbar Ram	Communist Party of India
1969	Ram Surat Singh	Indian National Congress
1974	Shah Abdul Faiz	Bharatiya Kranti Dal
1977	Mohd Khalilullan Kuraishi	Janata Party
1980	Ram Narain	Janata Party (Secular)
1985	Amitabh Anil Dubey	Indian National Congress
1989	Khursheed	Independent
1991	Udai Pratap	Bharatiya Janata Party
1993	Election countermanded due to violence	
1994^	Raj Bahadur	Bahujan Samaj Party
1996	Rajendra	Communist Party of India
2002	Umashankar Kushwaha	Bahujan Samaj Party
2007	Saiyyada Shadab Fatima	Samajwadi Party
2012	Vijay Kumar Mishra	Samajwadi Party
2017	Sangeeta Balwant	Bharatiya Janata Party
2022	Jai Kisan Sahu	Samajwadi Party

== Election results ==
=== 2027 ===
2027 Uttar Pradesh Legislative Assembly election: Ghazipur Sadar
Party	Candidate	Votes	%	±%
INDIA				
NDA				
BSP				
NOTA	None of the above			
Majority				
Turnout				
gain from		Swing		

=== 2022 ===
2022 Uttar Pradesh Legislative Assembly election: Ghazipur Sadar
Party	Candidate	Votes	%	±%
SP	Jai Kishan Sahu	92,472	40.81	+12.96
BJP	Smt. Sangeeta Balwant Bind	90,780	40.06	−3.06
BSP	Dr. Raj Kumar Singh Gautam	33,931	14.97	−10.78
NOTA	None of the above	421	0.19	−0.51
Majority		1,692	0.75	−14.52
Turnout		226,595	62.04	−1.0
SP gain from BJP		Swing		

=== 2017 ===
Bharatiya Janta Party candidate Sangeeta Balwant won in 2017 Uttar Pradesh Legislative Elections defeating Samajwadi Party candidate Rajesh Kushwaha by a margin of 32,607 votes.

2017 Uttar Pradesh Legislative Assembly election: Ghazipur Sadar
Party	Candidate	Votes	%	±%
BJP	Sangeeta	92,090	43.12	
SP	Rajesh Kushwaha	59,483	27.85	
BSP	Santosh Kumar	54,987	25.75	
NOTA	None of the above	1,479	0.7	
Majority		32,607	15.27	
Turnout		213,558	63.04	

== See also ==
- Ghazipur
- Ghazipur district
- List of constituencies of Uttar Pradesh Legislative Assembly
