= Hariram Vyas =

Poet, musician and saint

Shri Hariram Vyas
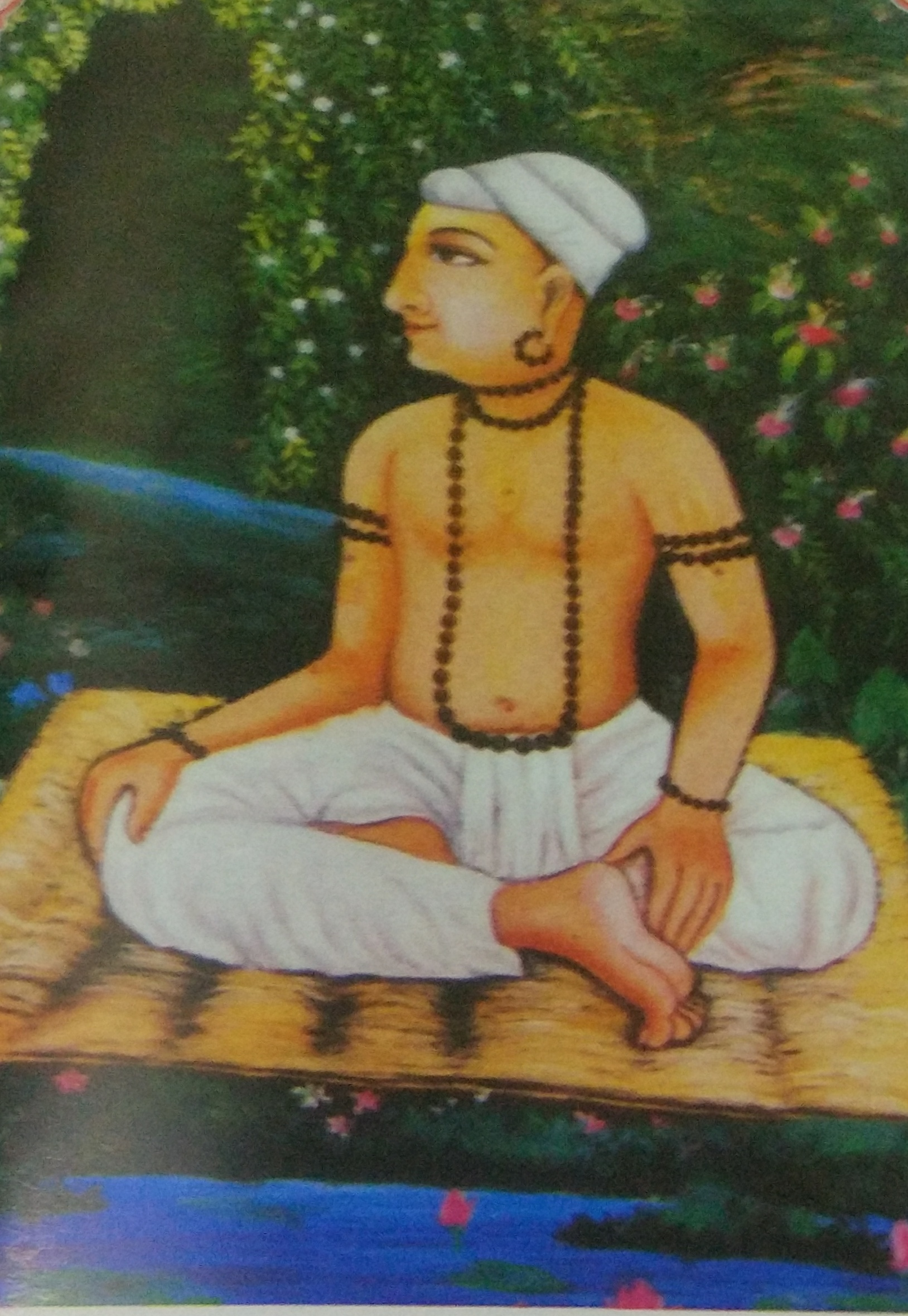

Personal life
- Born: 1512 Orchha, Orchha State (Present day Niwari district, Madhya Pradesh)
- Died: Unknown Vrindavan, Agra Subah (present-day Mathura district, Uttar Pradesh)
- Known for: Established Jugal Kishore Temple

Religious life
- Religion: Hinduism
- Philosophy: Vedanta
- Sect: Radha Vallabha Sampradaya

Religious career
- Teacher: Hita Harivansh
- Disciples: Raja Madhukar Shah

Hariram Vyas was a 16th-17th century spiritual poet, classical musician and saint belonging to the Radha Vallabha Sampradaya. He is known to have revealed the Vigraha or Shri Jugal Kishore ji, which is today in Panna (Madhya Pradesh), from a well in Kishore Van in Vrindavan.

Radhavallabha is a Vaishnava denomination which began with the Vaishnava theologian Hith Harivansh Mahaprabhu. Hariram Vyas together with Hith Harivansh Mahaprabhu and Swami Haridas are known as Haritraya (Trinity of Hari). He is considered to be an incarnation or descension of Vishakha Sakhi who is considered to be the foremost sakhi of Radharani. He is credited with a large body of devotional compositions, especially in the Dhrupad style. His work influenced both the classical music and the Bhakti movements of North India, especially those devoted to Krishna's consort Radha. As a poet he is credited for bringing development of Krshna-Bhakti literature to light in the pages of Indian history. Rupa Goswami, Sanatana Goswami, Mahaprabhu Vallabhacharya, Vitthalnath (Gusainji), and Chaitanya Mahaprabhu were his contemporaries.

== Life and background ==
Hariram Vyas Ji was born in the year 1512 in a Sanadhya Brahmin family in Orchha, Bundelkhand. His father Shri Sumokhan Shukl was a follower of Madhva tradition, he was a respected man in his community, and Rajguru(royal priest) of the Orchha royal family. Hariram ji showed a keen interest in Sanskrit from an early age and achieved great mastery of Vedas and Holy Scriptures at a young age. He was soon appointed as the Rajguru(Royal priest) to King Madhukar Shah of Orchha. Apart from being a renowned pandit and intellectual he was also famous for his debating skills.

In his early years he was obsessed with debating with other intellectuals and had defeated many famous Pundits. He would go and do Shashtrarth (debate) with any Pundit he would hear about and win the debate with his knowledge. But, this phase of his life didn't last very long. Soon, he gave up engaging in meaningless debates, shallow arguments and was completely devoted to the bhakti-marg. He soon renounced his home, family, wealth, and his position as the rajguru of Orchha king and came to Vrindavan. There he lived his life as a vagabond and spent time in satsang with saints like Hith Harivansh Mahaprabhu and Swami Haridas.

There are many disagreements and contradicting theories about who his diksha - guru was. One theory suggests that he was initiated into Madhva tradition by his father Sumokhan Shukl and that his deviation from the tradition and his interest towards Krishn bhakti was inspired by the preachings of his father's guru Sanyasi Madhavdas. And, finally after hearing a doha written by Sant Navaldas he followed his inner voice and came to the epicenter of madhura bhakti - Vrindavan where he began his satsang with Shri Haridas and Hit Harivansh.

Another popular theory suggests that after hearing about the popularity of Hith Harivansh Mahaprabhu he came to Vrindavan and challenged him for a debate. But, upon hearing one of his dohas became his disciple.

Vyas Ji's father Sumokhan Shukl had been a disciple of and received Madhva tradition diksha from Shri Madhavdas who was Chaitanya Mahaprabhu's guru-bhai. And, Vyas Ji had received diksha from his father in the same tradition. Hence, even though he was not a direct disciple of Madhavdas, he comes under his Guru-Shishya tradition.

Vyas Ji in his Sanskrit work called 'Navratna' has also clearly mentioned that he considers himself to belong to Madhva tradition. But, in his later years he felt a pull towards Hith Harivansh Mahaprabhu's Radha-Vallabha tradition. This is the reason we can find both Dvaita philosophy of Madhva tradition together with the devotional worship elements of the Radha-Vallabha tradition.

While one of his son was a disciple of Hith Harivansh Mahaprabhu's son Vanchandra Ji, his other son Kishoredas received diksha from Swami Haridas. This shows that Vyas Ji respected all traditions equally.

== Poetry and other works ==
Hariram Ji's poems, couplets, dohas were largely composed in Braj bhasha. However he has composed and written in Sanskrit as well. Apart from devotional dohas or couplets, he also wrote couplets on life principles, morality, and stories of his times. He is said to have composed thousands of couplets and dohas. But the exact number is not known. Some of his known major devotional dohas, poems in Braj bhasha have been compiled and published in a book called Shri Vyas Vani. Other works include 1) Raagmala (Hindi/Braj Bhasha) 2) Navratna (Sanskrit) 3) Swadharm Paddati (Sanskrit)

His complete life and works have also been documented by Vasudev Goswami in his book Bhakt Kavi Vyas Ji. Vyas Ji has praised saints and devotees in many of his poems. He has specifically named, appreciated and expressed his gratitude towards many contemporary and earlier saints and devotees for removing his own ignorance and doubts through their works, poems and held them in high regard like his Gurus. Here are a couple of illustrations talking about Hit Harivansh.

उपदेस्यो रसिकन प्रथम,तब पाये हरिवंश।
जब हरिवंश कृपा करी ,मिठे व्यास के संश॥ (Shri Vyas Vani, Pad 14, Pg. 194)

Such dohas by Vyas Ji have given strength to the theory that Harivansh Ji was his guru. But, the fact of the matter is that Vyas Ji had attained such an extreme state of devotion where he had transcended his ego and attained his true self or God. With this sentiment he has called each devotee and saint his guru in the following doha.

आदि, अंत अरु मध्य में, यह रसिकन की रीति।
संत सबै गुरुदेव है, 'व्यासहि' यह परतीत॥ (Shri Vyas Vani, Saakhi 2, Pg. 408)

Vyas Ji has used kind and respectful words to address all saints and devotees. But, he has dedicated many dohas to express his respect for Hith Harivansh Mahaprabhu as a Guru. Hence, it is often agreed that he was his Sadguru. However, his father is largely considered to be his initiating Guru (Diksha-Guru).

Speaking about Krshna-Radha marriage: 
मोहन मोहिनी को दूलहु। 
मोहन की दुलहिनी मोहनी सखी निरखि निरखि किन फूलहु। 
सहज   ब्याह   उछाह ,सहज  मण्डप ,सहज यमुना के कूलहू। 
सहज  खवासिनि   गावति   नाचति   सहज  सगे  समतूलहु॥ (Shri Vyas Vani, Pg. 362)

Speaking about how he lived carefree by completely surrendering his life to God:
काहू के  बल  भजन कौ ,काहू के आचार। 
व्यास भरोसे कुँवरि के ,सोवत पाँव पसार॥ (Shri Vyas Vani, Pg. 182)

Speaking about how only devotion is the way to success in life:
जो त्रिय होइ न हरि की दासी। 
कीजै कहा रूप गुण सुन्दर,नाहिंन श्याम उपासी॥
तौ दासी गणिका सम जानो दुष्ट राँड़ मसवासी। 
निसिदिन अपनों अंजन मंजन करत विषय की रासी॥
परमारथ स्वप्ने नहिं जानत अन्ध बंधी जम फाँसी। (Shri Vyas Vani, Pg. 84)

Description of Spring Season in Vrindavan:

चल चलहिं वृन्दावन वसन्त आयो।
झूलत झूलन के झँवरा मारुत मकरन्द उड़ायो॥
मधुकर कोकिल कीर कोक मिलि कोलाहल उपजायो।
नाचत स्याम बजावत गावत राधा राग जमायो॥
चौबा चंदन बूका बन्द्न लाल गुलाल उड़ायो।
स्याम स्यामिनी की छवि निरखत रोम-रोम सचु पायो॥ (Vyas Vani, Pg. 415)

Description of Monsoons in Vrindavan:

आजु कछु कुंजन में वर्षा सी। 
बादल दल में देखि सखी री चमकति है चपला सी॥ 
नान्हीं नान्हीं बूंदनि कछु धुरवा से बहै सुखरासी।
मंद मंद गरजनि सी सुनियत नाचती मोर सभा सी॥ 
इंद्रधनुष बग पंगत डोलति ,बोलति कोक-कला सी।
इन्द्र वधू छवि छाइ रही ,मनु गिरि पर अरुन घटा सी॥
उमगि मही रूह सेमहि फूली भूली मृग माला सी।
रटत व्यास चातक ज्यों रसना रस पीवत हूँ प्यासी॥ (Shri Vyas Vani, Pg. 392)

Songs based on the literature written by Shri Hariram Vyas were written around 504 years ago.

== Legends ==
One of the stories about Hariram Vyas was told by the court pandit of Orchha. Coming to Vrindavan, Swami Hariram Vyas found the association of Hit Harivansh Goswami and fell in love with Vrindavan and Radha Krishna. He decided to give up material life and stay in the Dham and do bhajan and so sent word to the king of Orcha. The king implored him to return to do his worldly duties at the court.

“What is better, acting for one's own benefit or for the benefit of a great number of people in society?” The king challenged. “Is not your wish to remain in Vrindavan merely your own selfish desire?”

Hariram Vyas accepted the king's logic, but his heart could not agree. He said, “You are right, but I will only go if my friend Hit Harivams Goswami, allows me to go, for it is from him that the desire to stay here has come.” His response to the king is mentioned in the following doha.

वृंदावन के रूख हमारे माता पिता सुत बंधा।
गुरु गोविंद साधुगति मति सुख, फल फूलन की गंधा||
इनहिं पीठि दै अनत डीठि करै सो अंधान में अंधा।
व्यास इनहिं छोड़ै और छुड़ावै ताको परियो कंधा||

The king sent ministers to the Goswami and Harivans did indeed tell Hariram Vyas to tend to his worldly duties until they released him. This upset Hariram, who had become attached to his life of musical devotion, writing poetry and absorption in Radha and Krishna's name, forms and pastimes. Devastated, he began to prepare to leave the Dham.

As one last act in the Dham, the tearful Hariram came to the Radha Vallabha temple that had already closed after the midday meal. There he saw a sweeper woman standing at the doorstep with a leaf plate of prasadam from Radha Vallabha. When Hariram saw her and the prasad, he immediately begged some of it from her, and she reluctantly ceded some of her touched food to the Brahmin.

The minister and envoys from Orcha were there waiting for Hariram to finish his prayers and get on their way, but when they saw him taking food from an outcaste woman, they concluded that he had lost his caste, and returned without him.

When Shri Hariram Vyas Ji felt that Kabirdas Ji has not been able to obtain Braj Ras.

Although he was already Sidha Rasik Saint, and he often used to see the divine leelas of Yugal Sarkar, (but just to teach us a lesson that even a small Bhakta Apradh can almost destroy the complete sadhna of a sadhak) once he felt that “Kabir Das hardly understood the Braj Ras (Bliss of Braj)”. He cast aspersions on the integrity of Shree Kabir Das Ji and thought that Kabir Das has not been able to achieve the topmost bliss of Braj. As soon as he thought of this, he could no longer see the divine pastimes of Radha Krishna. Hit Harivansh Mahaprabhu concluded that Shri Krishna can never tolerate the offense towards his saints. Hari Ram Vyas Ji felt sorry and on the advice of his master "Hit Harivansh Mahaprabhu”, Vyas Ji wrote a few lines in praise of Kabirdas which are as such:

"कलि में सांचो भक्त कबीर ।
जबते हरि चरणन रति उपजि, तब ते बुनयो न चीर ।
दियो लेत न जांचै कबहूँ, ऐसो मन को धीर ।
जोगी, जती, तपी, सन्यासी, मिटी ना मन की पीड़ ।
पाँच तत्त्व ते जन्म न पायो, काल न ग्रसो शरीर ।
व्यास भक्त को खेत जुलाहों, हरि करुणामय नीर ।"

Vyas Ji saw in his visions that Kabir Das is manifesting from Yamuna Ji and Shri Krishna is following him and he again composed two lines which Shri Krishna himself composed of Kabir Das in his visions :

"मन ऐसा निरमल भया जैसे गंगा नीर ।
पीछे-पीछे हरि फिरैं कहत कबीर-कबीर ॥ "

== Commentary on caste and social order ==
Upper caste Hindus and Brahmins often take great pride in their caste and are particular about things like janeu (holy thread), but Vyas ji was free from these notions even though he was born in a highly respected rajguru brahmin family. Compared to true devotion (bhakti), he not only considered caste unimportant, but also a complete waste of time and energy. He advised people to drop the pride of caste and devote one's life in true bhakti. He held that a lower caste person who finds true devotion is far better than lakhs of Brahmins devoid of true devotion because while they are themselves asleep and lost, they claim to awaken and show the way to others.

Vyas Ji didn't seem to care to know identity of fellow Hari-bhakts and freely took prasad from one and all. This is mentioned in one of the dohas written by him:

स्वान प्रसादे छुइ गयो, कौआ गयो बिटारि।
दोउ पावन 'व्यास' कें, कह भागोत बिचारि॥
'व्यास' रसिक जन ते बड़े, ब्रज तजि अनत न जायँ।
वृन्दावन के स्वपच लों, जूठनि मांगे खाय॥
'व्यास' मिठाई विप्र की, तामें लागे आग।
वृन्दावन की स्वपच की, जूठनि खेये माँग॥

By abandoning practice of untouchability and caste-divide Vyas Ji went against the social norms of his times and had to face wrath and disdain of many sections of the society. But he refused to be moved by such treatment. When people appealed that he respect the caste system and uphold the place of Brahmins he fearlessly said-

'व्यास'हिं ब्राह्मण जिन गनों, हरि-भक्तन कौ दास।
राधावल्लभ कारनै, सहयों जगत उपहास॥26॥
जासों लोग अधर्म कहत हैं, सोई धर्म है मेरौ।
लोग दहिने मारग लाग्यो, हौंब चलत हों डेरों।x
जिनकी ये सब छोति करत हैं, तिनहि के हों चेरों॥230॥

== Later life and death ==
Vyas Ji continued to stay in Vrindavan for the remainder of his life and remained immersed in Radha Krishn bhakti and produced many works. During his stay he also established Jugal Kishore temple. The temple was built with the help of Orchha king Madhukar Shah. The idols remained in the temple for many years but in order to protect the idols from a Mughal invasion, devotees shifted the idols to Panna. These idols are still placed in Old Jugal Kishore temple in Panna which is now in Madhya Pradesh.

The exact year of his death is not known but Vyas Ji's samadhi sthal constructed by Orchha prince Veersingh Dev can still be found in Vrindavan.
