= Saiyyada Shadab Fatima =

Indian politician

Uttar Pradesh Legislative Assembly
- In office March 2007 – March 2012
- Preceded by: Umashanker, BSP
- Succeeded by: Vijay Kumar Mishra, SP
- Constituency: Ghazipur Sadar
- In office 2012–2017
- Preceded by: Kali Charan, BSP
- Succeeded by: Om Prakash Rajbhar, SBSP
- Constituency: Zahoorabad

Child Health and Women Welfare Ministry

Personal details
- Born: Gangauli, Ghazipur, Uttar Pradesh
- Party: Bahujan Samaj Party
- Other political affiliations: Samajwadi Party (2012-2017)
- Spouse: Saiyad Nasim Haider
- Children: Late Saiyad Kashif
- Occupation: Social Worker and Politician
- Profession: Business
- Cabinet: Child Health and Women Welfare Ministry

Syeda Shadab Fatima is an Indian politician. She was elected as the Member of Uttar Pradesh Legislative Assembly from Ghazipur Sadar Constituency from year 2007 on symbol of Bahujan Samaj Party and again from Zahoorabad Constituency from year 2012 over Samajwadi Party symbol.
