= Zahoorabad Assembly constituency =

Constituency of the Uttar Pradesh legislative assembly in India

Coordinates: 25°44′55.64″N 83°42′47.12″E

Zahoorabad
- Constituency No. 377 for the Uttar Pradesh Legislative Assembly

Constituency details
- Country: India
- Region: North India
- State: Uttar Pradesh
- District: Ghazipur
- Total electors: 4,07,091
- Reservation: None

Member of Legislative Assembly
- 18th Uttar Pradesh Legislative Assembly
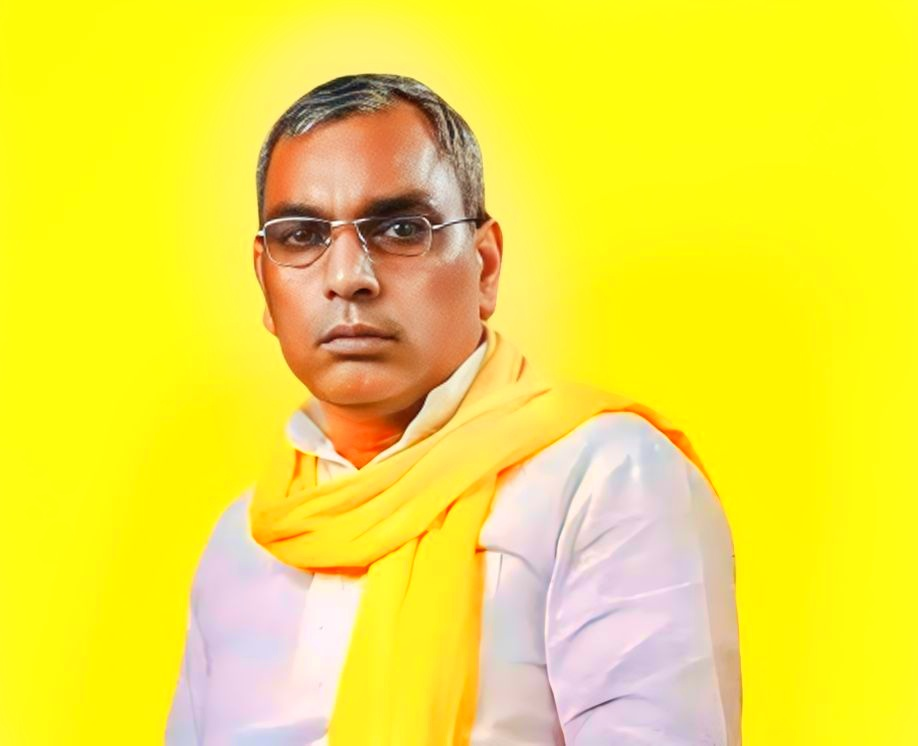
- Incumbent Om Prakash Rajbhar
- Party: SBSP
- Alliance: NDA
- Elected year: 2022

Zahoorabad is a constituency of the Uttar Pradesh Legislative Assembly covering the city of Zahoorabad in the Ghazipur district of Uttar Pradesh, India.

Zahoorabad is one of five assembly constituencies in the Ballia Lok Sabha constituency. Since 2008, this assembly constituency is numbered 377 amongst 403 constituencies.

== Members of Legislative Assembly ==
Year	Member	Party
1962	Raghubir	Communist Party of India
1974	Raghubir	Bharatiya Kranti Dal
1977	Jairam	Communist Party of India
1980	Surendra Singh	Indian National Congress (I)
1985	Surendra Singh	Indian National Congress
1989	Virender Singh	Indian National Congress
1991	Surendra Singh	Janata Dal
1993	Isteyak Ansari	Bahujan Samaj Party
1996	Ganesh	Bharatiya Janata Party
2002	Kalicharan Rajbhar	Bahujan Samaj Party
2007	Kalicharan Rajbhar	Bahujan Samaj Party
2012	Saiyyada Shadab Fatima	Samajwadi Party
2017	Om Prakash Rajbhar	Suheldev Bharatiya Samaj Party
2022	Om Prakash Rajbhar	Suheldev Bharatiya Samaj Party

== Election results ==
=== 2027 ===
2027 Uttar Pradesh Legislative Assembly election: Zahoorabad
Party	Candidate	Votes	%	±%
INDIA				
SBSP	Om Prakash Rajbhar			
BSP	Manoj Rajbhar			
NOTA	None of the above			
Majority				
Turnout				
gain from		Swing		

=== 2022 ===
2022 Uttar Pradesh Legislative Assembly election: Zahoorabad
Party	Candidate	Votes	%	±%
SBSP	Om Prakash Rajbhar	114,860	46.45	▲8.89
BJP	Kalicharan Rajbhar	69,228	28.0	
BSP	Saiyyada Shadab Fatima	53,144	21.49	▼8.23
NOTA	None of the above	1,834	0.74	▲0.09
Majority		45,632	18.45	▲10.61
Turnout		247,266	60.74	▼0.81
SBSP hold		Swing		

=== 2017 ===
Suheldev Bharatiya Samaj Party candidate Om Prakash Rajbhar won in 2017 Uttar Pradesh Legislative Elections by defeating Bahujan Samaj Party candidate Kalicharan by a margin of 18,081 votes.

2017 Uttar Pradesh Legislative Assembly Election: Zahooraba
Party	Candidate	Votes	%	±%
SBSP	Om Prakash Rajbhar	86,583	37.56	
BSP	Kalicharan	68,502	29.72	
SP	Mahendra	64,574	28.01	
NISHAD	Kanhaiya	2,681	1.16	
NOTA	None of the above	1,500	0.65	
Majority		18,081	7.84	
Turnout		230,520	61.55	
