= Jai Kishan Sahu =

Indian politician

18th Uttar Pradesh Assembly
- Leader: Akhilesh Yadav

Personal details
- Resting place: Jalalabad, Ghazipur
- Spouse: Chhaya Sahu
- Children: 2 girls (Anita Sahu, Sunita Sahu) 2 boys (Ankur Sahu, Suraj Sahu)
- Parent: Late Ramnath Sahu
- Education: M.A.
- Occupation: Businessman
- Profession: Politician

Jai Kishan Sahu (born 1964) is an Indian politician. He is a member of the 18th Uttar Pradesh Assembly from the Ghazipur Sadar Assembly constituency. He is a member of the Samajwadi Party.
