= Om Prakash Rajbhar =

Indian politician (born: 1962)

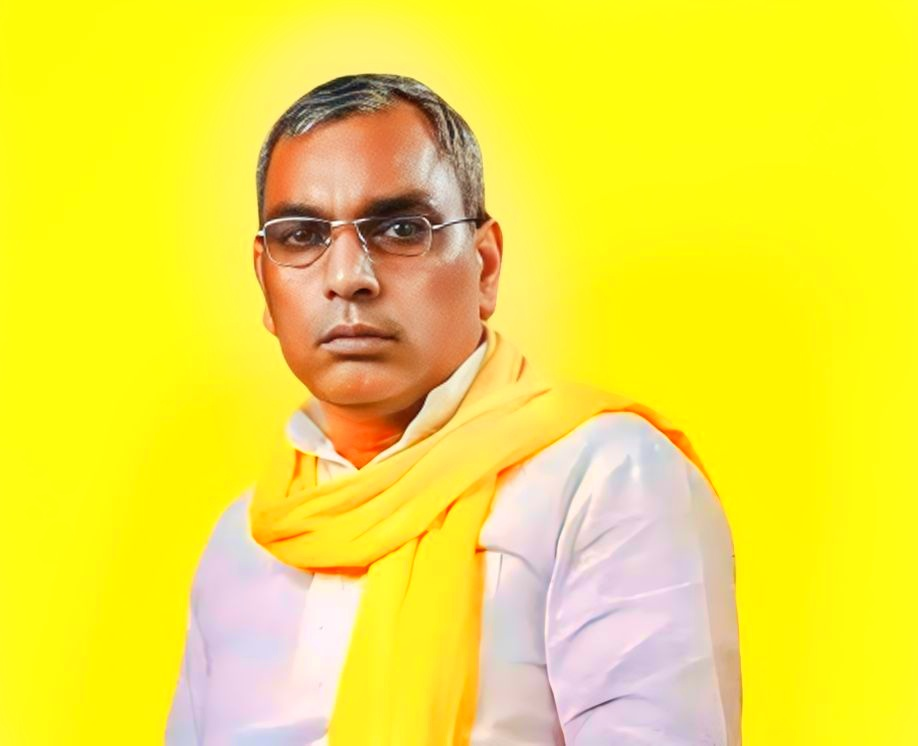

President of Suheldev Bharatiya Samaj Party
- Incumbent
- Assumed office 27 October 2002
- Preceded by: Position established

Cabinet Minister Government of Uttar Pradesh
- Incumbent
- Assumed office 05 March 2024
- Ministry&Departments: Panchayati Raj; Minority Welfare; Haj & Wakf
- Chief Minister: Yogi Adityanath
- Preceded by: Yogi Adityanath & Dharmpal Singh
- In office 19 March 2017 – 20 May 2019
- Ministry&Departments: Backward classes welfare; Disabled people development.
- Chief Minister: Yogi Adityanath
- Succeeded by: Anil Rajbhar

Member of Uttar Pradesh Legislative Assembly
- Incumbent
- Assumed office 11 March 2017
- Preceded by: Saiyyada Shadab Fatima
- Constituency: Zahoorabad

Personal details
- Born: 15 September 1962 (age 64) Varanasi, Uttar Pradesh, India
- Party: Suheldev Bharatiya Samaj Party
- Spouse: Taramani (m. 1979)
- Children: 4
- Profession: Politician, agriculturalist

Om Prakash Rajbhar (born 15 September 1962) is an Indian politician who is chairperson of the Suheldev Bharatiya Samaj Party (SBSP). He is a member of 18th Uttar Pradesh Assembly from Zahoorabad constituency of Uttar Pradesh.

== Personal life ==
Rajbhar was born on 15 September 1962 to Sannu Rajbhar in Varanasi, Uttar Pradesh. He graduated from Baldev Degree College, Badagaon, Varanasi in 1983. Rajbhar married Taramani on 26 April 1979, with whom he has two sons and two daughters. He is an agriculturalist by profession and a resident of Zahoorabad.

== Political career ==
Prior to establishing a separate political Party Omprakash Rajbhar was in Bahujan Samaj Party. He was District President of Varanasi in BSP. He has contested Assembly election two times from Kolsala Vidhan Sabha constituency, once in 1991 and again in 1996. In 1991 as BSP candidate Omprakash secured 18,421 votes and stood on third position. In 1996 as BSP candidate he secured 32,777 votes and stood on third position. In 2002 Assembly elections of Uttar Pradesh he could not succeed to secure BSP ticket, thereafter he got separated from BSP.

Rajbhar is a member of the 18th Legislative Assembly of Uttar Pradesh. Since 2017, he has represented the Zahoorabad and is a member of the SBSP.

On 19 March 2017, Rajbhar became a cabinet minister in the Yogi Adityanath ministry as the minister of the Department of Backward Classes Welfare and the Department of Disabled People development.

On 20 May 2019, Rajbhar was sacked from Cabinet of Yogi Adityanath due to anti-alliance activities.

In October 2021, Rajbhar announced that his party will form an alliance with Samajwadi Party for the 2022 Uttar Pradesh Legislative Assembly election.

In 2022 Uttar Pradesh Legislative Assembly election working in alliance with SP, SBSP contested 17 seats in UP and won 6 seats with party leader Om Prakash Rajbhar in Uttar Pradesh.

In March 2024, Om Prakash Rajbhar was one of the four ministers who was inducted into state Cabinet, sworn-in at the Raj Bhavan by Governor Anandiben Patel in the presence of Yogi Adityanath.

== Views ==
In a 2022 interview with The Wire, Rajbhar said he is not a Hindu, and will not join NDA. He questioned whether the construction of the Ram Mandir would get the poor and backward children educated. He also asked BJP to focus more on schools and education rather than mandirs.

== Controversy ==
In 2023, when asked to make a comment on the soft landing of Chandrayaan-3 on the Moon, he said, "I thank Indian scientists for their hard work and research. I congratulate them on their achievement with Chandrayaan-3. Once they safely return to Earth tomorrow, the entire country should welcome them". Notably, Chandrayaan-3's flight to the Moon was unmanned, and there was no plan for it to return to the Earth.

== Posts held ==
#	From	To	Position
1	2017	2019	Minister of backward welfare
2	2017	2022	Member, 17th Legislative Assembly of Uttar Pradesh
3	2022	Incumbent	Member, 18th Legislative Assembly of Uttar Pradesh

== See also ==
- Uttar Pradesh Legislative Assembly
