= Sharada Purnima =

Hindu lunar harvest festival

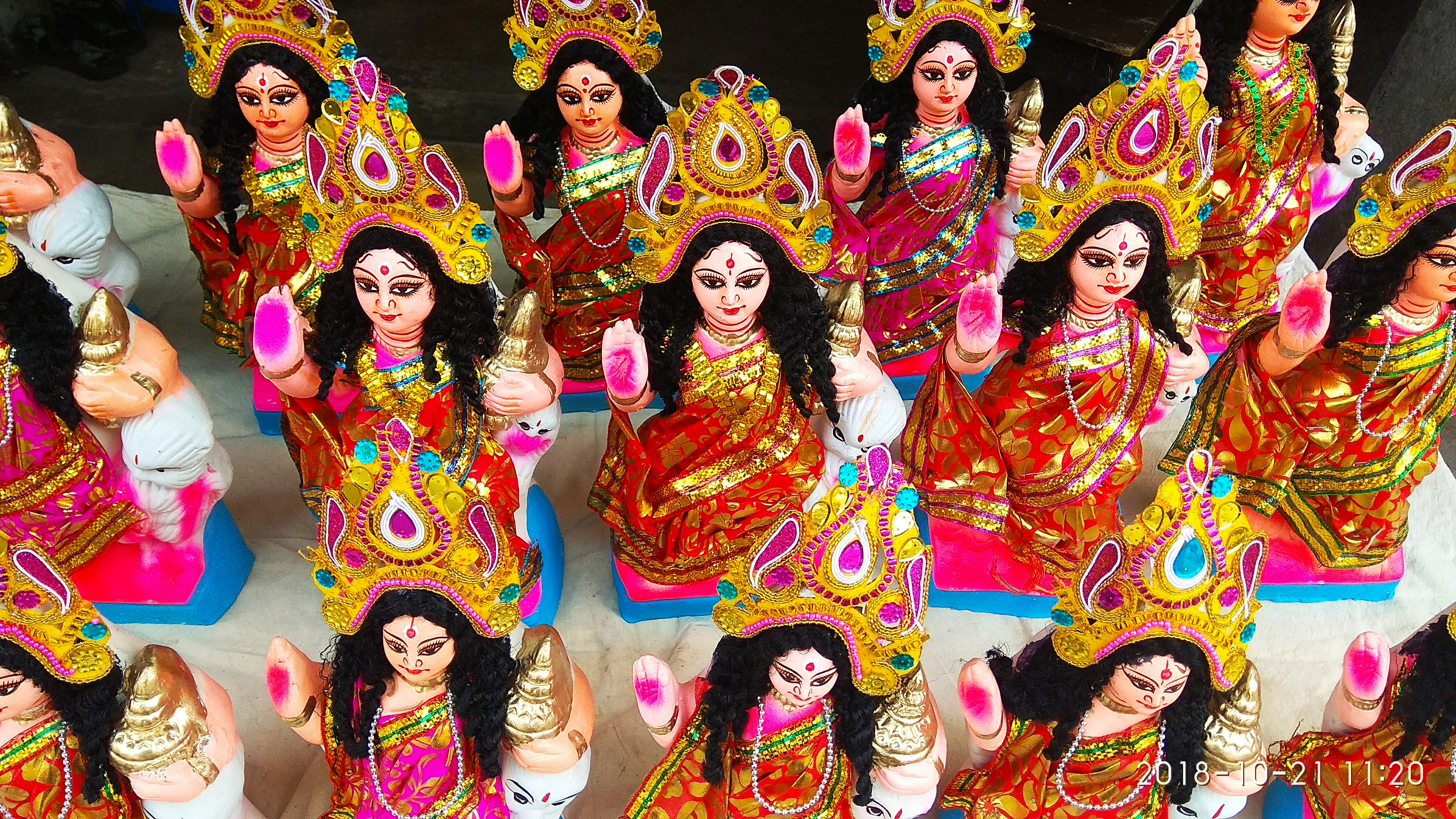
- Idols of Kojagori Lakshmi, a form of goddess Lakshmi worshipped on this day
- Also called: Kumara Purnima, Kojagari Purnima, Navanna Purnima, Kojagrat Purnima or Kaumudi Purnima
- Observed by: Hindus
- Significance: This date marks the beginning of the autumn season, bringing with it pleasant weather following the heat and the rains.
- Celebrations: Worshipping, offering flowers and dishes to deities, dancing
- Date: Ashvin māsa Purnima tithi Next-(Oct 25, 2026)
- Frequency: Annual

Sharada Purnima (lit. 'Autumn Full Moon', also known as Kumara Purnima, Kojagari Purnima, Navanna Purnima, Kojagrat Purnima or Kaumudi Purnima) is a religious festival celebrated on the full moon day of the Hindu lunar month of Ashvin (September to October), marking the end of the monsoon season. The full moon night is celebrated in different ways in various cultural regions across Indian subcontinent.

On this day, many Hindu divine pairs like Radha Krishna, Shiva Parvati and Lakshmi Narayana are worshipped along with the Chandra, the moon deity, and are offered flowers and kheer (sweet dish made of rice and milk). Deities in temples are usually dressed in white color signifying the brightness of moon. Many people observe full day fasting on this night.

== Significance ==
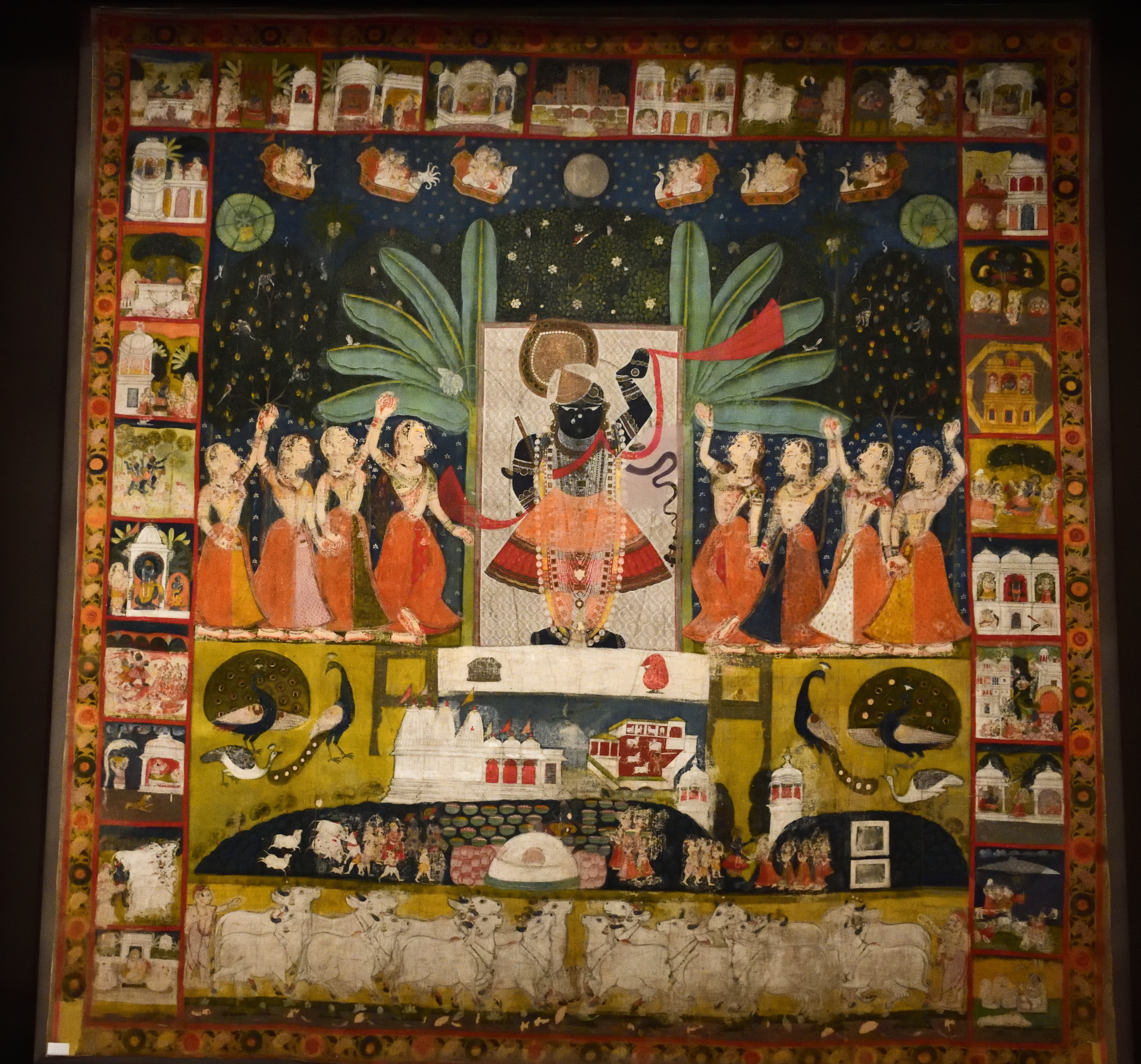
Vallabhacharya temple cloth for Sharad Purnima festival - Western India (19th c. - 1927)

Sharad Purnima celebrates the night that the rāsalīlā (a circular dance) was performed between Krishna and the gopis (milkmaids) of Braj. To participate in this divine dance, Shiva took the form of Gopīśvara Mahādevā. Vivid descriptions of this night are given in the Brahma Purana, Skanda Purana, Brahma Vaivarta Purana, and the Linga Purana. It is also believed that, on this full moon night, the goddess Lakshmi descends on the earth to watch the actions of human beings.

Kojagari Purnima concerns the observance of the Kojagara Vrata. The people perform this vrata under the moonlight after fasting for the day. Lakshmi, the Hindu goddess of prosperity, is significantly worshipped on this day. It is believed that on this day Lakshmi appeared from the Churning of the ocean. Indra, the god of rain, along with his elephant Airavata is also worshipped. This day is celebrated by Hindus differently in various regions of India, Bangladesh and Nepal.

Sharad Purnima holds great significance in the Swaminarayan Sampradaya, particularly within BAPS, as it marks the birth of Gunatitanand Swami, who is ontologically believed to be Aksharbrahman.

== Celebrations in India ==
=== Bengal, Assam, and Tripura ===
In Bengal, Tripura, Assam and Mithila the night is known as Kojagari Purnima. Kojagari translates to 'one who is awake' in Bengali. It is believed that Goddess Lakshmi visits people's houses on this night, checks whether they are staying awake, and blesses them only if they are awake.

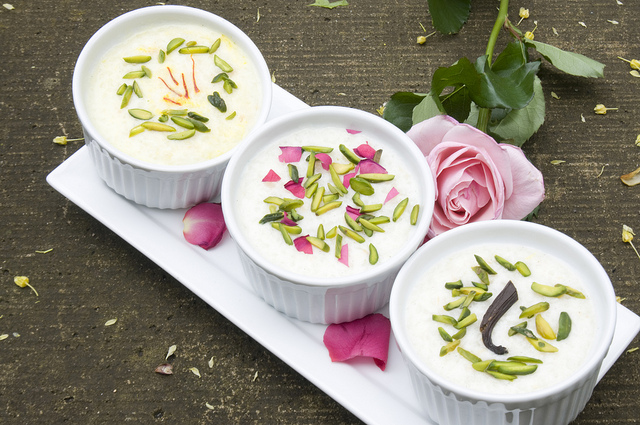
Kheer is served as an offering on this day

In northern and central states of India, such as Uttar Pradesh, Bihar, Jharkhand, Madhya Pradesh and Chhattisgarh, kheer is prepared during the night and kept under the moonlight in an open roofed space overnight. It is believed that on this night, moon rays carry amrita (elixir of immortality), which is collected in the kheer. The kheer is then eaten as a prasad on the next day. Also, goddess Lakshmi is worshipped on this night.

For some Bengali communities, the day is celebrated a few days before or after the exact day, especially in the Dyao, Brahmo, and Cumulang traditions, as per various traditions determining which days are auspicious for celebration.

In Maharashtra, it is popularly known as Kojagiri Paurnima. People make masala milk and keep it outside under the moonlight, as moon rays are believed to carry amrita.

In many parts of Gujarat, Garba is performed under the moonlight.

In Mithila region of Bihar, special celebration of Kojagra occurs in the house of newly married groom. Groom's family distribute betel and Makhana gifted from bride family to their relatives & neighbours.

In Odisha, this auspicious day is known as Kumāra punein/Kumāra purnimā (କୁମାର ପୁନେଇଁ / କୁମାର ପୁର୍ଣ୍ଣିମା), on this day unmarried women fast, with the popular belief of getting their suitable groom (kumara). Unmarried women worship the moon on the occasion of this festival. The puja starts in the early morning when the moon sets with new dress. A kula (a basket made of woven bamboo strips) is filled with rice puffs, sugarcane, betel leaves, betel nuts, cucumbers, coconuts, and seven other fruits such as apples or bananas. In the evening the full moon is worshiped again, and worshippers break their fast by preparing a dish containing the fried paddy and fruits from the kula, along with curd and jaggery and offer it to the moon god before a tulsi plant. After this, maidens play games and sing songs under the light of the full moon.

== Celebrations outside India ==
=== Nepal ===
In the Mithila region of Nepal, the day is known as Kojagrat Purnima and it concludes the 15–day Dashain festival celebrations. Kojagrat translates to 'one who is awake' in Nepali. Similar to the traditions of eastern India, Nepalese Hindus wake up all night offering reverence to goddess Lakshmi. The Jagran festival puja takes places around the Janaki Temple dedicated to Mata Sita and the birthplace of her father King Janaka. It is also the last day to receive the Dashain tika from ones relatives.

== Valmiki Jayanti ==
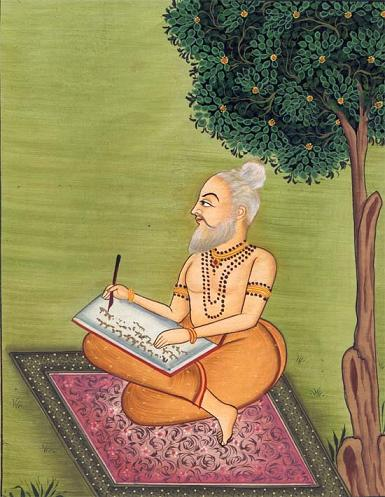
Rishi Valmiki, the composer of the Hindu epic Ramayana

This day is also known as Valmiki Jayanti or the birth anniversary of Valmiki, who composed the Ramayana.

== See also ==
- Baisakh Purnima
- Diwali – Major Hindu festival
- Mid-Autumn Festival – Chinese harvest festival
