= Hita Harivansh =

Vrindavan saint, poet, founder of Radha Vallabh Sampradaya

Sri Hit Harivansh Chandra Mahaprabhu
- Sri Hit Harivansh Chandra Mahaprabhu
- Title: Mahaprabhu

Personal life
- Born: Baad, Uttar Pradesh, India
- Died: Vrindavan
- Spouse: Rukmini
- Parents: Byas Mishra (father); Tara Rani (mother)
- Notable work(s): Hita-Caurāsī, Sfut Vāñī, Yamunāshtak and 2 Letters to his disciple in Junagadh
- Known for: Devotional poetry
- Honors: Sant

Religious life
- Religion: Hinduism
- Founder of: Radha Vallabh Sampradaya
- Philosophy: Bhakti

Religious career
- Teacher: Srimati Radha Rani

Shri Hita Harivansh Mahaprabhu (another spelling, Hita Harivaṃśa) was a Braj language bhakti poet-sant and the founder of Radha Vallabh Sampradaya. His principal work is the hymnal Hita-Caurāsī.

== Early life ==
Born in Baad near Mathura on the 11th Day of the Hindu month of Vaishakh (Ekadashi). He is considered by his followers to be the incarnation of Krishna's flute.

A follower of Prema Bhakti and devotee of Srimati Radha Rani as the ultimate Supreme Power. He was the Guru of Jaimal Rathore, ruler of Martha State and brother of Mirabai.

His father Vyasa Mishra was a Gaur Brahmin and court astrologer in the court of the then emperor, some say it was Sikandar Khan Lodi and others believe that it was Humayun

== Works ==
Harivansh Mahaprabhu's principal work is the Hita-Caurāsī (Caurāsī Pad) — the eighty-four verses in Braj Bhasha praising Radha.
