= Radha Vallabha Sampradaya =

Hindu tradition that reveres goddess Radha as the Supreme being

Radha Vallabha
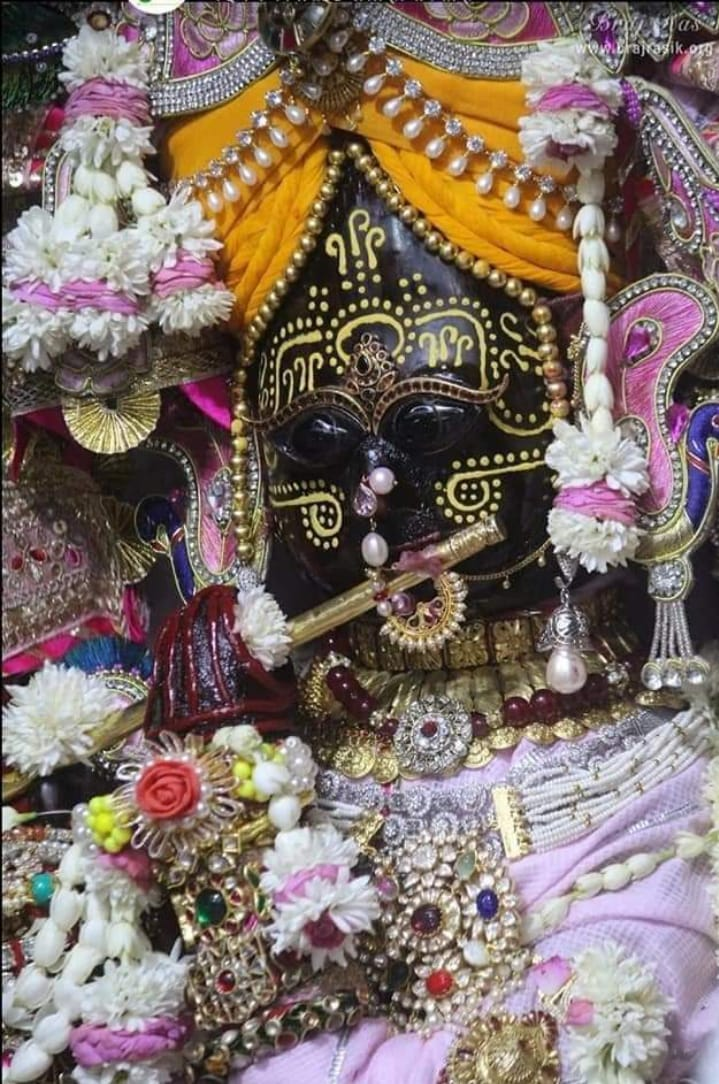
- Central deity of Radha Vallabh Temple, Vrindavan

Founder
- Hita Harivansh

Regions with significant populations
- Mathura, Uttar Pradesh

Religions
- Hinduism, Vaishnavism

Scriptures
- Hita-Chaurāsī • Brahmavaivarta Purana

Languages
- Braj Bhasha • Sanskrit

Website
- radhavallabhmandir.com

The Radha Vallabha Sampradaya is a Vaishnava Hindu denomination founded in 1535 at Vrindavan by Hita Harivansh (1502–1552). Harivansh Ji's views are related to Krishnaism, but emphasises devotion to the goddess Radha as the Supreme Being.

== Features ==
According to the scholar Guy L. Beck, the Radha Vallabha Sampradaya has the following features, in comparison with Krishnaite traditions.

1. Its view on Radha and Krishna differentiates from normative Krishnaite theology. The Supreme Being in this tradition is Radha, while her consort Krishna is described to be the penultimate step toward the supreme deity, and her most intimate servant. (Note: As a precursor to this view can understand the 12th-century poet Jayadeva, in whose Gita Govinda (10.9) Krishna beneath Radha.)
2. The tradition prefers to remain unaffiliated with any classical philosophical positions and resisted affiliation with the four major Vaishnavite sampradayas. (Note: Scholars sometimes count the Radhavallabhis as an offshoot of Nimbarka Sampradaya.)
3. It declines to produce theological and philosophical commentaries, based on pure bhakti, divine love.
4. The founder and followers lived and lives as householders and sannyasa is not praised.
5. It defines liberation not in terms of moksha or Vaikuntha or Goloka, but as participation as a witnessing companion (sakhi) in the divine play of Radha and Krishna.

== Scriptures ==
The main scriptures of the sampradaya are created in regional language Braj Bhasha, which is regarded within the tradition as the sacred language associated with Radha and Krishna, both in earthly Vrindaban and in the eternal divine abode. These scriptures emphasize poetry and singing verses rather than philosophical views.

- Hita-Caurāsī (a.k.a. Caurāsī Pad): the eighty-four verses (hymns), the principal work of Hita Harivansh.
- Vyāhulau Utsav ke Pad (the Wedding Hymns of Radha and Krishna): celebrating the eternal marriage of Radha and Krishna.
- Hita Radha Sudha Nidhi: a Sanskrit stotra traditionally attributed to Hita Harivansh, reflects Radhavallabh theology.

The Radha Vallabha Sampradaya also preserves a large collection of unpublished poetry composed by later members of its disciplic lineages.

== Lineage of Radha Vallabha Sampradaya ==
The Radha Vallabh Temple, Vrindavan, is a famous temple among the sect. In this temple, there is no idol of Shri Radha, but a 'Gādī Sevā' (throne) is placed next to Krishna to signify her presence. Beck notes that the throne serves as a symbolic surrogate for Radha, who is considered beyond physical representation in this tradition and reflects her supreme status.

The kirtan "Samaj-Gayan" is the Radha-vallabha's collective style of hymn singing by the Hindustani classical music forms, such "dhrupad" and "dhamar". It developed early in Vrindavan and uses Braj Bhasa devotional poetry as a collective form of worship.

== Notable people ==
- Premanand Govind Sharan
- Hariram Vyas

== See also ==
- Govind Dev Ji Temple
- Bankey Bihari Temple
- Radha Raman Temple
- Madan Mohan Temple
- Radha Damodar Temple, Vrindavan
- Radha Madan Mohan Temple, Vrindavan
- Radha Vallabh Temple, Vrindavan
