= Madin =

Madin may refer to:

== Places in Iran ==
- Madin, Bardsir (مدين - Madīn), a village in Kerman Province
- Madin, Jiroft (مدين - Madīn), a village in Kerman Province
- Madin, Sirjan (مادين - Mādīn), a village in Kerman Province
- Madin, Sistan and Baluchestan (مادين - Mādīn), a village in Sistan and Baluchestan Province

== Other ==
- Madin (surname)
- Ma'din, an educational institution in Kerala, India
