= Madan =

Madan may refer to:

== Places ==
=== Armenia ===
- Kapan, a city in Armenia, formerly Madan
- Madan, a small village above Alaverdi in Lori Marz

=== Bulgaria ===
- Madan, Montana Province, a village in the Boychinovtsi municipality of northwestern Bulgaria
- Madan, Smolyan Province, a town and municipality in southern Bulgaria

=== Iran ===
- Madan, Chaharmahal and Bakhtiari, a village in Chaharmahal and Bakhtiari province, Iran
- Madan, Fars, a village in Fars province, Iran
- Madan, Kerman, a village in Kerman province, Iran
- Radeh-ye Madan, also known as Madan, a village in Khuzestan province, Iran
- Madan, Qazvin, a village in Qazvin province, Iran
- Madan, Razavi Khorasan, a village in Razavi Khorasan province, Iran
- Madan-e Olya, a village in Razavi Khorasan province, Iran
- Madan-e Sofla, a village in Razavi Khorasan province, Iran

=== Syria ===
- Ma'adan, a town in central Syria, also known as Madan

== People ==
- Madan (surname)
- Madan (film director), Telugu film writer and director
- Madan Puri (1915–1985), Indian actor

== Other uses ==
- Madan (people), an ethnic group from southern Iraq
- Medan (son of Abraham)
- "Madan" (song), a 2003 song by Martin Solveig and Salif Keita
- Sudalai Madan, a popular non-Vedic deity in southern India
- Madan Chopra, fictional villain from the 1997 Indian film Baazigar, played by Dalip Tahil
- Mad'an (slave)

== See also ==
- Madani (disambiguation)
- Madhan (disambiguation)
- Madan Mohan (disambiguation)
- Madanpur (disambiguation)
- Maden (disambiguation)
