= Banke Bihari Temple =

Hindu temple dedicated to the combined form of Radha Krishna in Vrindavan

- Kunj Bihari Temple
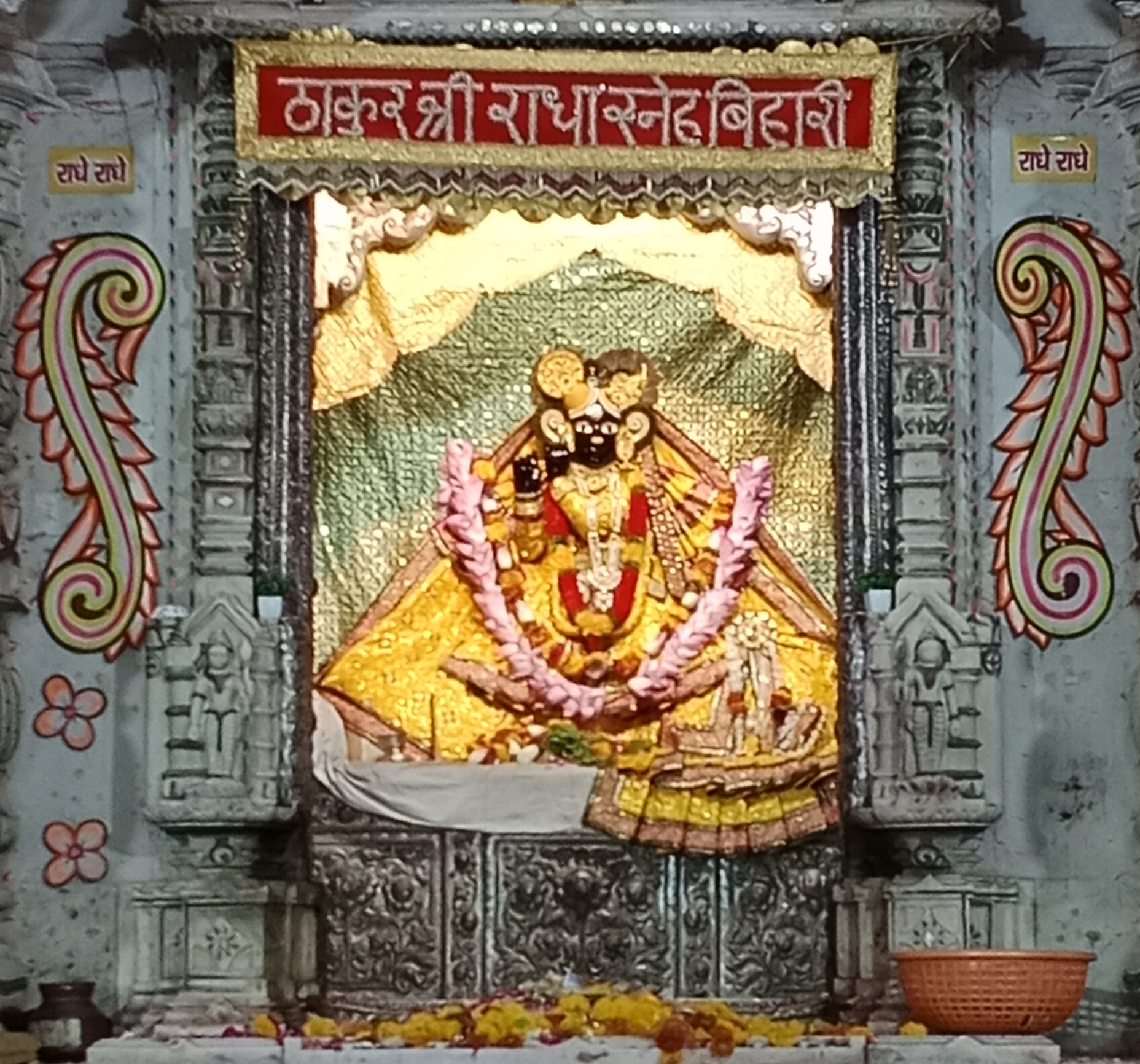
- Banke Bihari, a combined form of Radha Krishna at Banke-Bihari temple, Vrindavan

- Location in Uttar Pradesh

Religion
- Affiliation: Hinduism
- District: Mathura
- Deity: Banke Bihari (Radha and Krishna)
- Festivals: Janmashtami, Radhashtami, Holi, Sharad Purnima, Karthik Purnima

Location
- Location: Vrindavan
- State: Uttar Pradesh
- Country: India
- Coordinates: 27.57976°N 77.69051°E

Architecture
- Type: Rajasthani
- Completed: 1862
- Elevation: 169.77 m (557 ft)

Website
- bankeybihari.info bihariji.org

Banke Bihari Temple is a Hindu temple situated in the town of Vrindavan, Mathura district of Uttar Pradesh, India. The temple is dedicated to Banke Bihari who is believed to be the combined form of Radha and Krishna. Banke Bihari was originally worshipped at Nidhivan, Vrindavan. Later, when Banke Bihari temple was constructed around 1864, the icon of Banke Bihari was moved to its present temple.

In the Banke Bihari temple, the icon of Radha Krishna's united form stands in the Tribhanga posture. Swami Haridas originally worshipped this murti under the name of Kunj Bihari, which means the one who enjoys in the groves or Kunj of Vrindavan.

== History ==
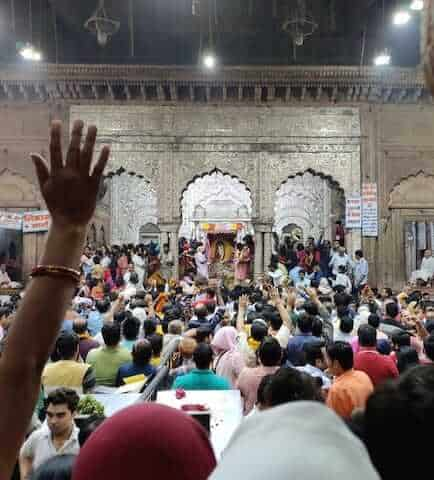
Devotees at Banke Bihari Mandir in Vrindavan

The murti of Banke Bihari was originally worshipped by Svāmī Haridās under the name Kuñjbihārī. His disciples bestowed the name Bānke Bihārī due to the image's tribhaṅga posture. The icon's appearance is celebrated on Bihar Panchami. Formerly, Bānke Bihārī was worshipped in Nidhivan, but was moved to the present location in the 19th century due a dispute between the sādhu and gosvāmī followers of Haridās. The gosvāmī's built the current temple and reside behind it.

== In scriptures ==
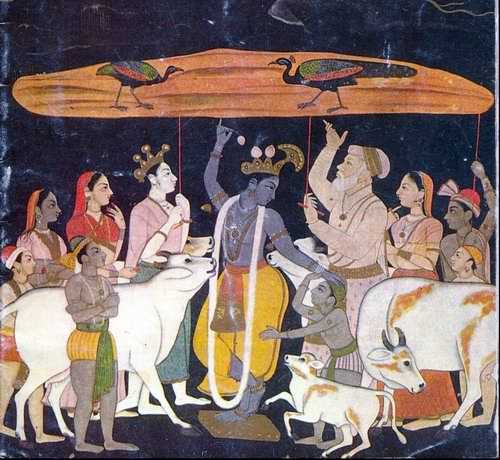
Krishna upholding the Govardhan mountain in the Tribhanga pose

'Bānke' means 'bent', and 'Bihāri' or 'Vihāri' means 'enjoyer'. This is how Kṛiṣhṇa, who is bent in three places, got the name "Bānke Bihāri". According to Śrī Brahma-saḿhitā (verse 5.31), Brahma says the following about Kṛishna

"I worship Govinda, the primeval Lord, round whose neck is swinging a garland of flowers beautified with the moon-locket, whose two hands are adorned with the flute and jewelled ornaments, who always revels in pastimes of love, whose graceful threefold-bending form of Śyāmasundara is eternally manifest."

== Rituals ==
In this temple, Banke Bihari is worshiped in the form of a small child. Thus, to avoid disturbing the deity, an early morning arti is not performed and bells are not hung anywhere inside the temple premises. Only on the occasion of Krishna Janmashtami, mangala aarti (early morning aarti) is performed. There is a popular belief that uninterrupted darshan will cause Banke Bihari to accompany devotees to their home and leave the temple empty. Therefore, the curtains are drawn every five minutes to avoid the uninterrupted darshan of Banke Bihari.

Once a year, on the occasion of Sharad Purnima Banke Bihari holds the flute in his hands. During the month of Shravan Banke Bihari is placed in a swing for one day.

== Gallery ==
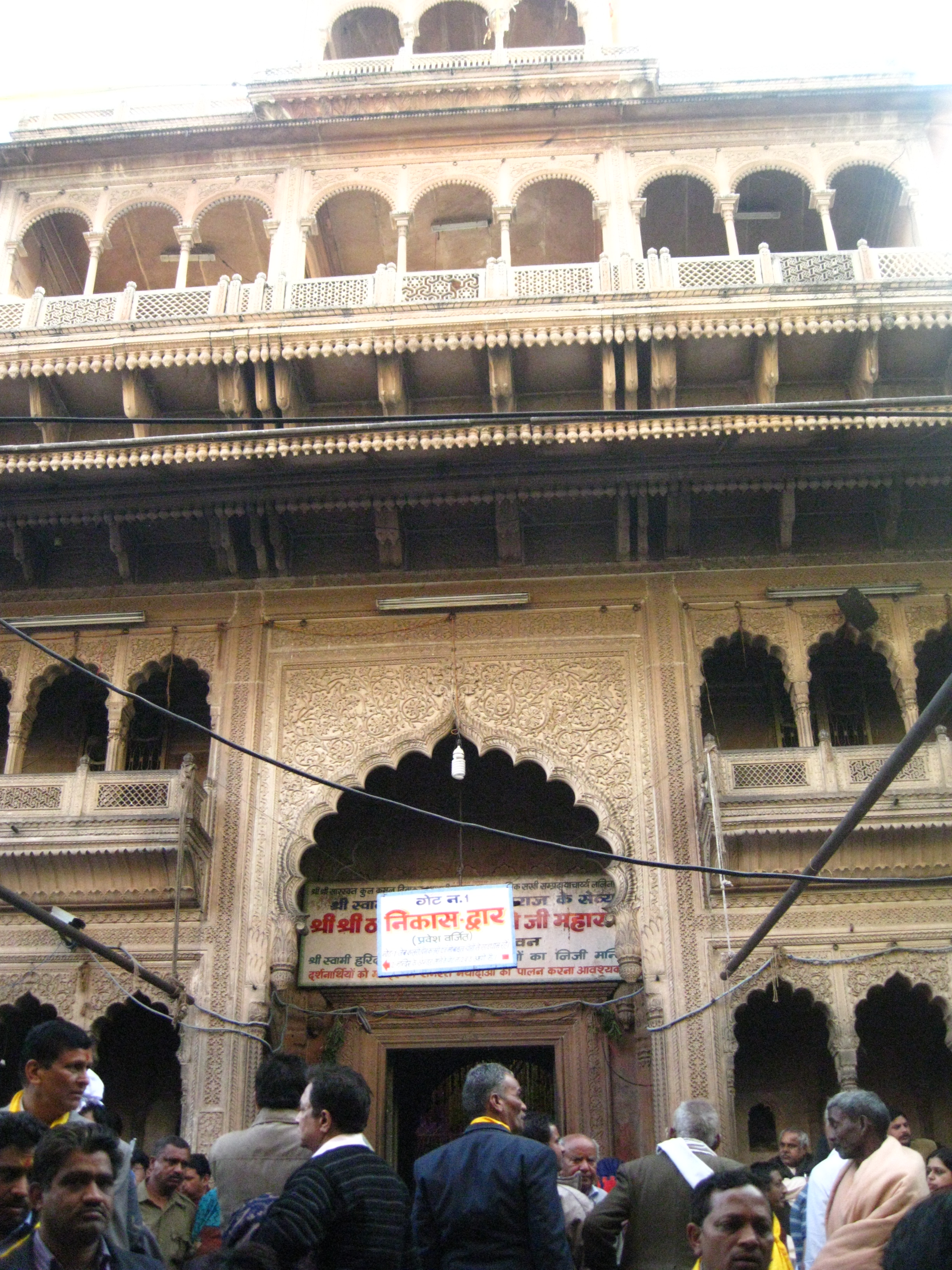
Entrance of Banke Bihari Temple

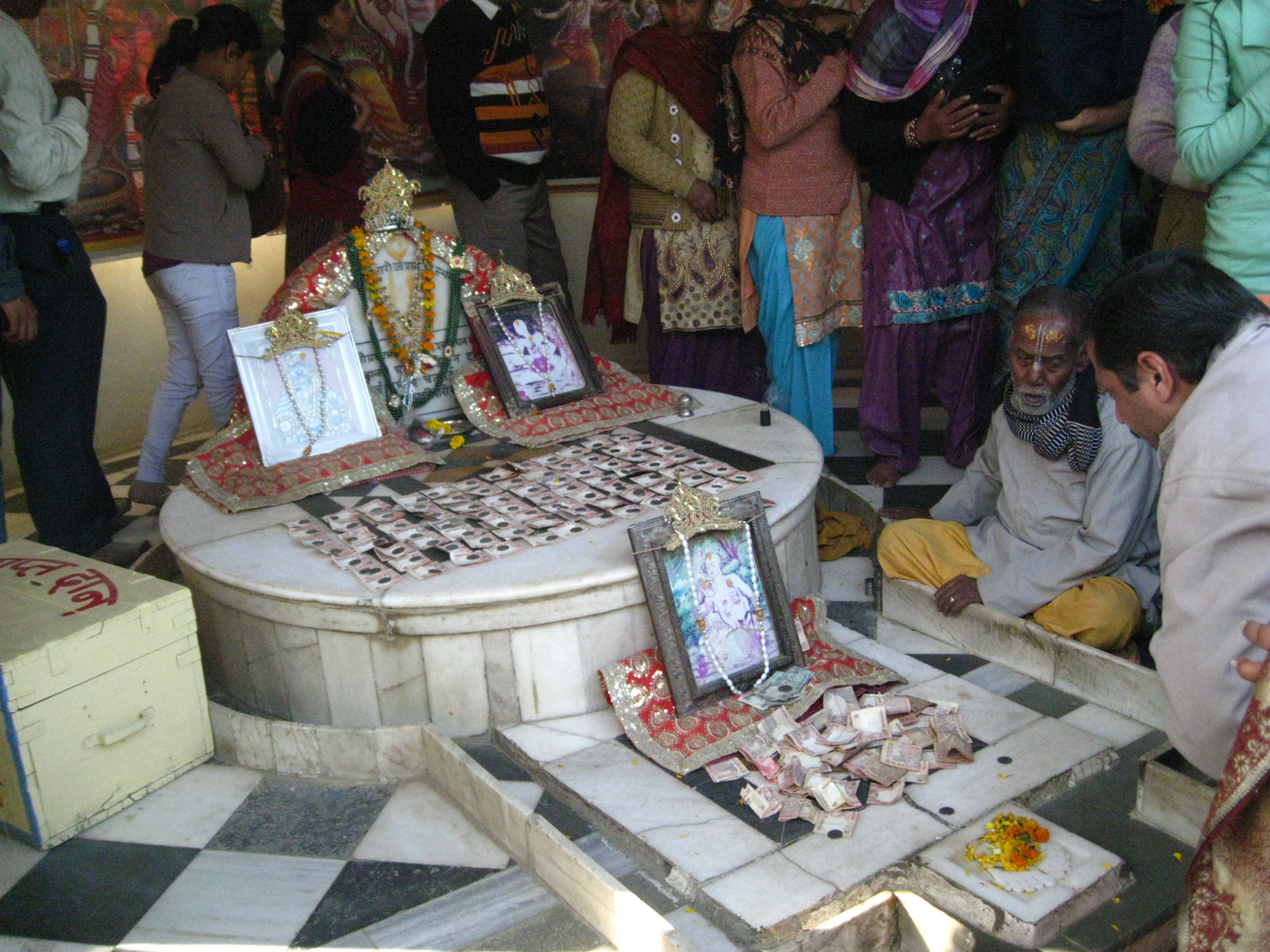
Nidhivana

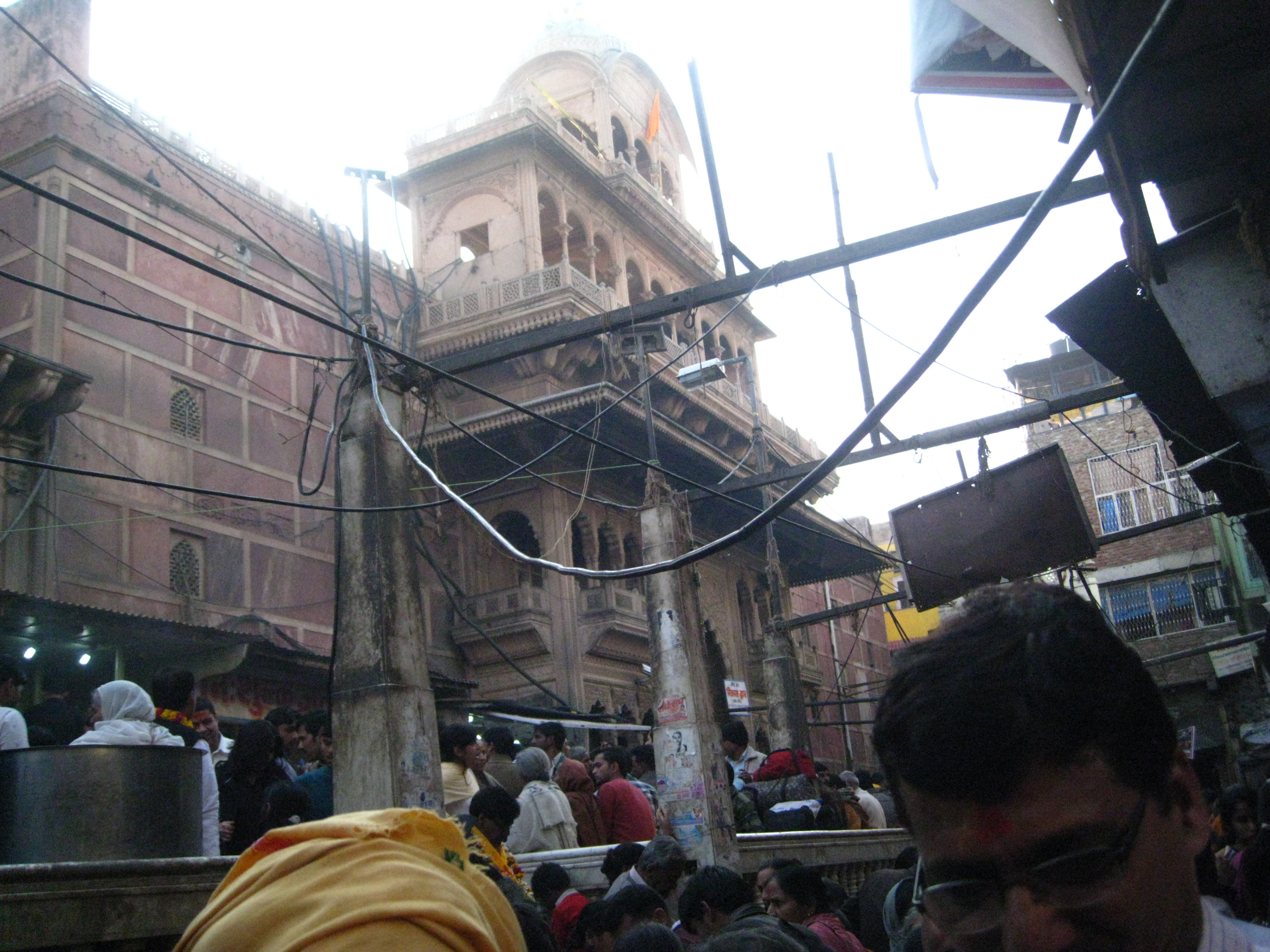
Bankey Bihari Temple gate, sideview

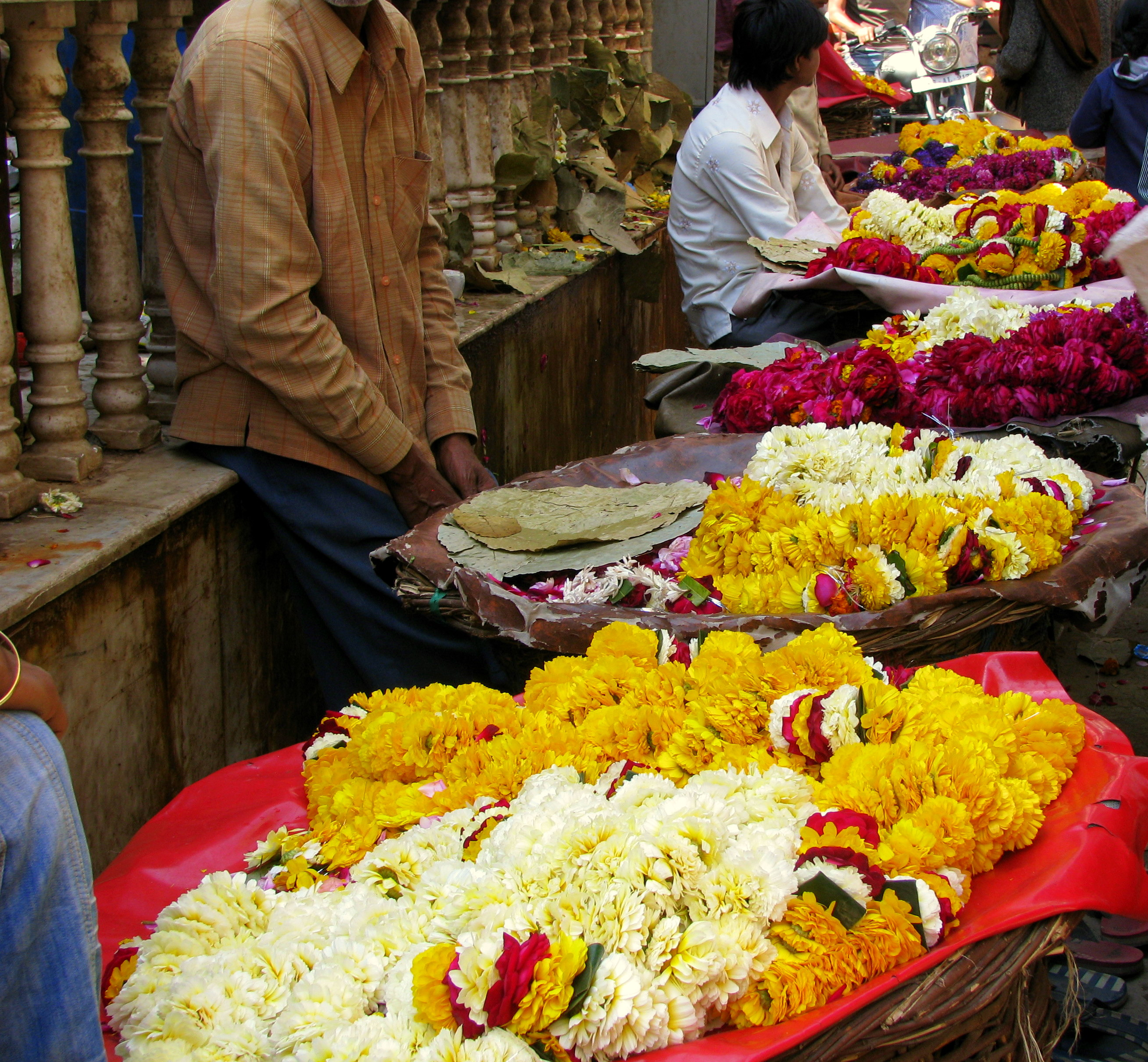
Garland sellers outside Banke Bihari Temple

== See also ==
- Radha Vallabh Temple, Vrindavan
- Nidhivan, Vrindavan
- Radha Raman Temple, Vrindavan
- Radha Rani Temple, Barsana
- Radha Damodar Temple, Vrindavan
- Radha Madan Mohan Temple, Vrindavan
