= Maden =

Maden may refer to:

== Places in Turkey ==
- Maden, Elazığ, a town and district in Elazığ Province
- Maden, Bayburt, a village of Bayvurt Province
- Maden, Şavşat, a village in Artvin Province

== Other uses ==
- Maden (film), a 1978 Turkish film
- Maden language, an Austronesian language spoken in West Papua

== People with the name ==
- Bishnu Maden (died 2003), Nepalese politician
- John Maden (1862–1920), British Liberal Party politician
- Henry Maden (1892–1960), English barrister and Liberal politician
- Richard Maden (born 1972), English swimmer
- Steve Maden (born 1982), English rugby league footballer
- Yannick Maden (born 1989), German tennis player
- Tom Maden, American actor

== See also ==
- Maiden (disambiguation)
- Madden (disambiguation)
- Madin (disambiguation)
- Madan (disambiguation)
