= Madan Mohan Temple =

Madan Mohan Temple may refer to several temples in India:

- Madan Mohan Temple, Bishnupur, a Hindu temple in West Bengal
- Madan Mohan temple, Cooch Behar, a Hindu temple in West Bengal
- Madan Mohan Temple, Karauli, a Hindu temple in Rajasthan
- Radha Madan Mohan Temple, Vrindavan, a Hindu temple in Uttar Pradesh

== See also ==
- Madan Mohan (disambiguation)
