= Haridaspur, Uttar Pradesh =

Village in India

Rajpur Vrindavan
- Interactive map of Rajpur Vrindavan
- Coordinates: 27°53′52″N 78°00′56″E
- Country: India
- State: Uttar Pradesh
- District: Aligarh

Government
  - Body: Gram panchayat

Languages
  - Official: Hindi
- Time zone: UTC+5:30 (IST)
- Nearest city: Aligarh, Khair
- Avg. summer temperature: Maximum up to 40 to 47 °C (104 to 117 °F)
- Avg. winter temperature: Minimum 2 to 5 °C (36 to 41 °F)
- Website: up.gov.in

Haridaspur is a village near Aligarh in Uttar Pradesh, India. It is also known by the name Khair wali Sarak. The name "Haridaspur" was given in honour of Swami Haridas, who was born in this village.

Haridaspur is 20 km from Khair and 3 km from Aligarh. The village is situated on Khair Road
