= Madani =

Madani may refer to:

== Places ==
- Wad Madani or Madani, a city in Sudan
- Azarbaijan Shahid Madani University, a state university in Iran

== People ==
=== Surname ===
- Abbassi Madani (1931–2019), Algerian politician
- Abdul Naseer Madani (born 1966), Indian Muslim leader
- Ahmad Madani (1929–2006), Iranian politician
- Hassan Madani (born 1979), Egyptian wrestler
- Mahmood Madani (born 1964), Indian politician
- Nawell Madani (born 1979), Belgian humorist
- Hussain Ahmad Madani (1879–1957), Indian Muslim leader
- Iyad bin Amin Madani (born 1946), Saudi politician
- Mohammed Ali Madani (died 2011), Libyan military leader
- Narimène Madani (born 1984), Algerian volleyball player
- Nizar Madani (born 1941), Saudi politician
- Ruhul Amin Madani (born 1971), Bangladeshi politician
- Wajih Al Madani (1921–1991), Palestinian army commander
- Yusuf al-Madani (born 1977), Yemeni military officer

=== Given name ===
- Madani Camara (born 1987), Ivorian football player
- Madani Naamoun (1944–2025), Algerian actor

== See also ==
- Madan (disambiguation)
- Al Madani
- Malaysia Madani
