= Madanpur =

Madanpur may refer to:

- Madanpur, India, town in Nadia district, West Bengal, India
  - Madanpur railway station
- Madanpur, Lalitpur, India, town in Uttar Pradesh, Indiadia
- Madanpur, Nuwakot, Nepal
- Madanpur, Rautahat, Nepal

== See also ==
- Madan (disambiguation)
- Madanpura, a village in Uttar Pradesh, India
- Madanapur, Telangana, India
