= Radha Raman Temple, Vrindavan =

Hindu temple dedicated to combined form of Radha Krishna in Vrindavan

Radha Raman Temple
- श्री राधारमण मन्दिर
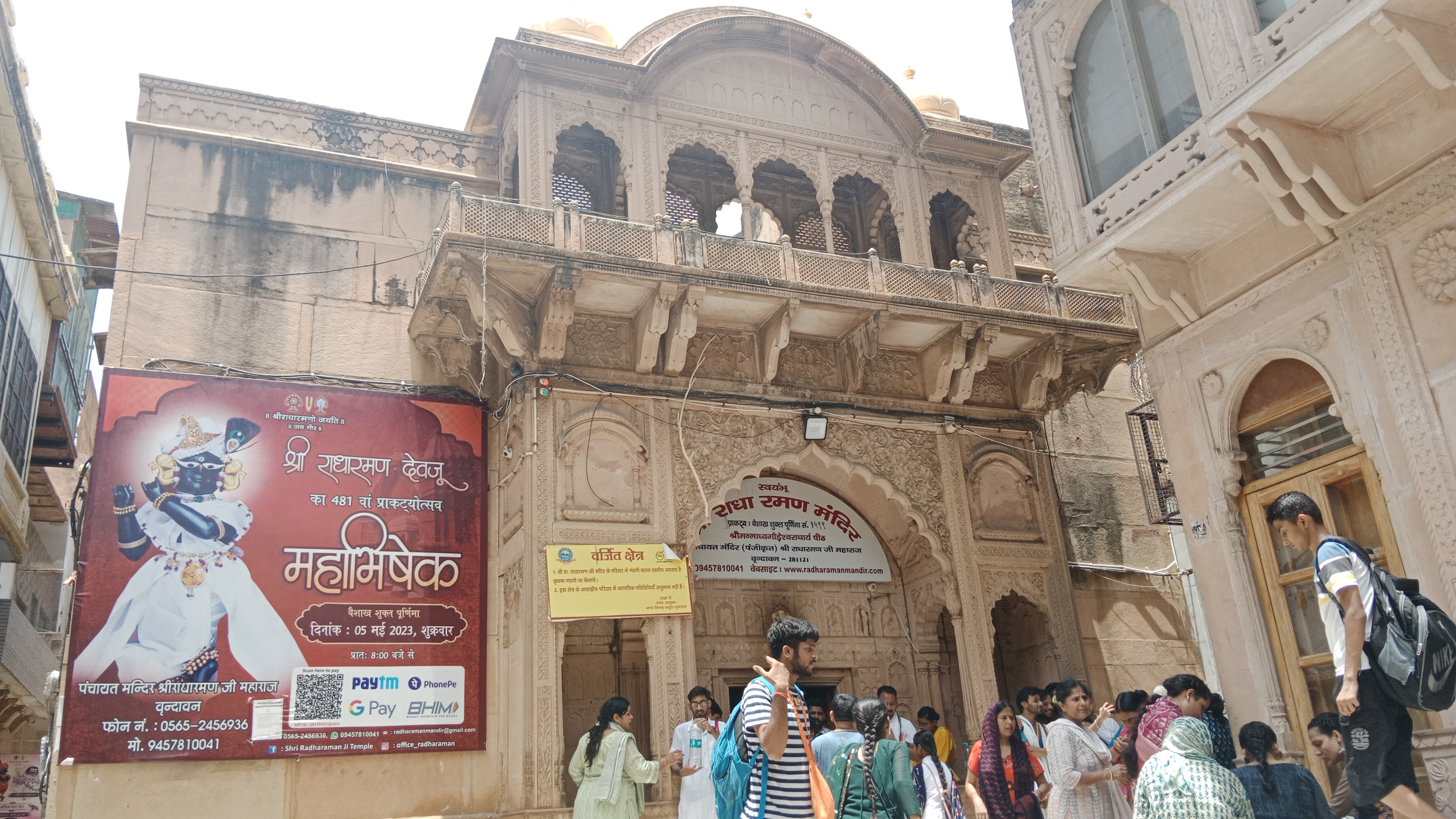
- Entrance of Radha Raman Temple, Vrindavan

- Location in Uttar Pradesh, India

Religion
- Affiliation: Hinduism
- District: Mathura
- Deity: Radha Ramana

Location
- Location: Vrindavan
- State: Uttar Pradesh
- Country: India
- Coordinates: 27°35′7.335″N 77°41′55.56″E

Architecture
- Type: Rajasthani
- Creator: Gopala Bhatta Goswami
- Completed: c. 1542 CE
- Elevation: 169.77 m (557 ft)

Website
- www.radharamanmandir.com

Sri Radha Raman Temple, is a Hindu temple situated in Vrindavan, India. It is dedicated to Krishna who is worshiped as Radha Ramana. This temple is counted as one of the Seven most revered ancient temples of Vrindavan along with Radha Vallabh Temple, Radha Damodar Temple, Radha Madanmohan Temple, Radha Govindji Temple, Radha Shyamsundar Temple and Radha Gokulnandan Temple. The temple houses the original Shaligram deity of Krishna alongside goddess Radha.

== History of the temple ==
Radha Raman means the lover (ramana) of Sri Radha. The temple was established over 500 years ago by Gopala Bhatta Goswami. At the age of thirty, Gopala Bhatta Gosvami came to Vrindavana. After Chaitanya Mahaprabhu's disappearance, Gopala Bhatta Gosvami felt intense separation from the Lord. To relieve his devotee from the pangs of separation, the Lord instructed Gopala Bhatta in a dream "If you want My Darshan then make a trip to Nepal".

In Nepal, Gopala Bhatta bathed in the famous Kali-Gandaki River. Upon dipping his waterpot in the river, he was surprised to see several Shaligrama Shilas enter his pot. He dropped the Shilas back into the river, but the Shilas re-entered his pot when he refilled it.

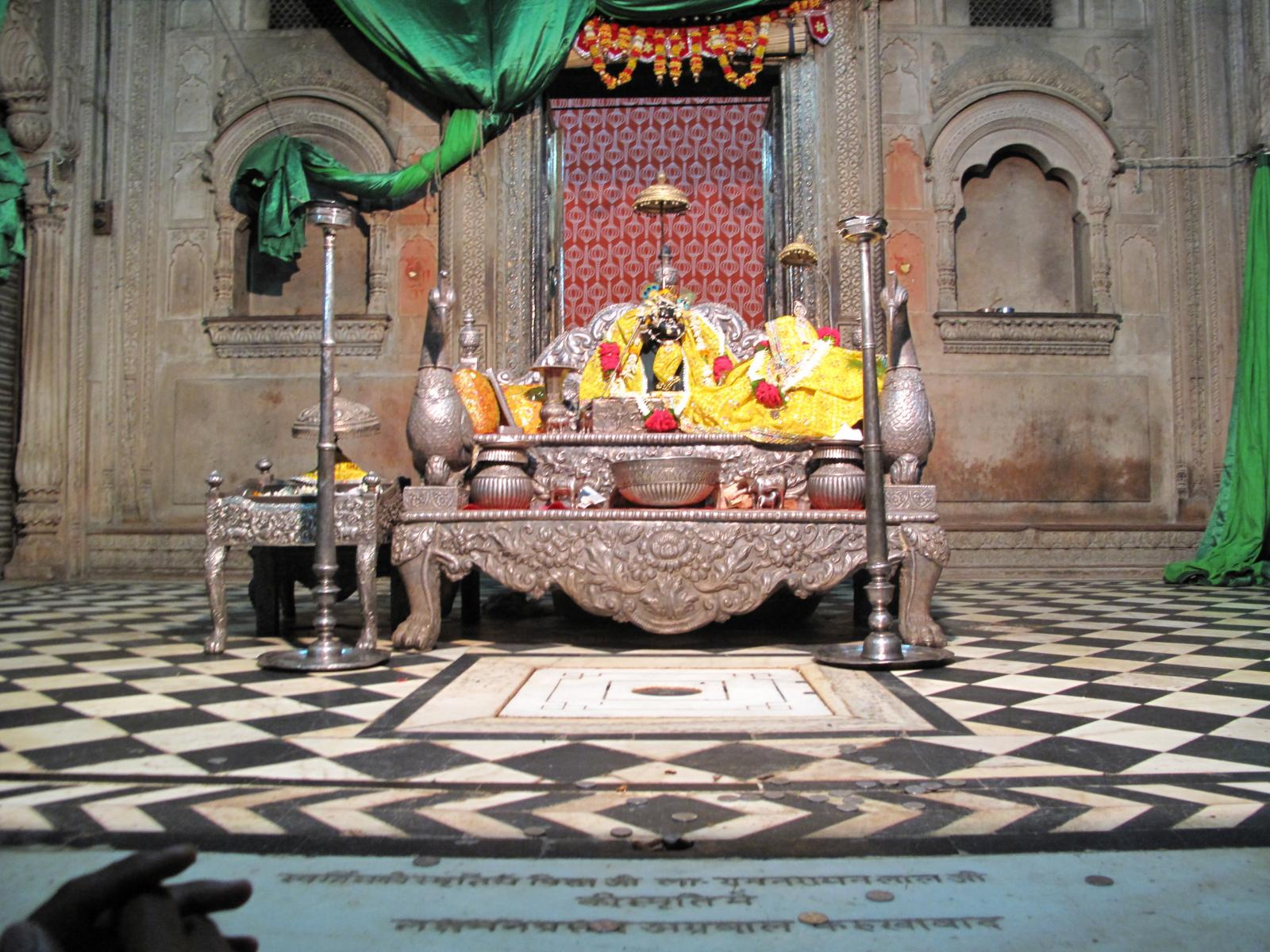
Deity at Radha Raman Temple, Vrindavan.

Gopala Bhatta Gosvami found twelve Shaligrama Shilas. It is believed that once a wealthy man came to Vrindavan and offered Gopala Bhatta a variety of clothes and ornaments for his Shaligramas in charity. However, Gopala Bhatta couldn't use these for his round-shaped Shaligramas. He advised the donor to give the deity decorations to someone else. It is believed that the donor refused to take them back and Gopala Bhatta kept the clothes and ornaments with his shilas.

On the Purnima (full moon) day, in the evening after offering naivedhya to his Shaligrama Shilas, Gopala Bhatta put them to rest covering Them with a wicker basket. Late in the night, Gopala Bhatta took a little rest. in the early morning he went to take bath in the Yamuna river. Returning from his bath, he uncovered the Shaligramas in order to render puja, and saw amongst them a Deity of Krishna playing the flute. There were now only eleven Shilas and a Deity. The "Damodara shila" had manifested as the beautiful three-fold bending form of Tri-Bhangananda-Krishna. In this way Radha Raman emerged in a perfectly shaped deity form from a sacred Shaligrama Shila. Devotees consider this image to be alive and that he grants a chosen family the privilege of assisting him in his daily schedule. In this way "the Lord has granted his wish and the stone was turned into the murti of Sri Krishna". As a narrative account of actualized Krishna-bhakti, Radharamana's appearance story highlights the divine-human relationship of love as the ontologically central category of ultimate reality.

The Prasad for Shri Radha Raman Ji is prepared by the male members of the Goswami families in the temple kitchen. The fire in the kitchen lit in early days of the temple still continues today. The Goswami families are allotted a calendar in advance for their personal seva (service) period and they perform seva accordingly. They also invite their disciples during their period and celebrate major family functions and ceremonies.

Inside the temple complex, the samadhi of Srila Gopal Bhatta Goswami is also situated. There the rarely available Unag vastra of Sri Chaitanya Mahaprabhu is kept.

== See also ==
- Radha-vallabha
- Krishna Balaram Mandir
- Prem Mandir Vrindavan
- Nidhivan, Vrindavan
- Vrindavan Chandrodaya Mandir
- Banke Bihari Temple
- Radha Rani Temple
- Govind Dev Ji Temple
- Radha Damodar Temple, Vrindavan
- Radha Madan Mohan Temple, Vrindavan
