= Swami Haridas =

Vrindavan saint, musician and poet, linked to Bhakti movement

Swami Haridasa Dagur
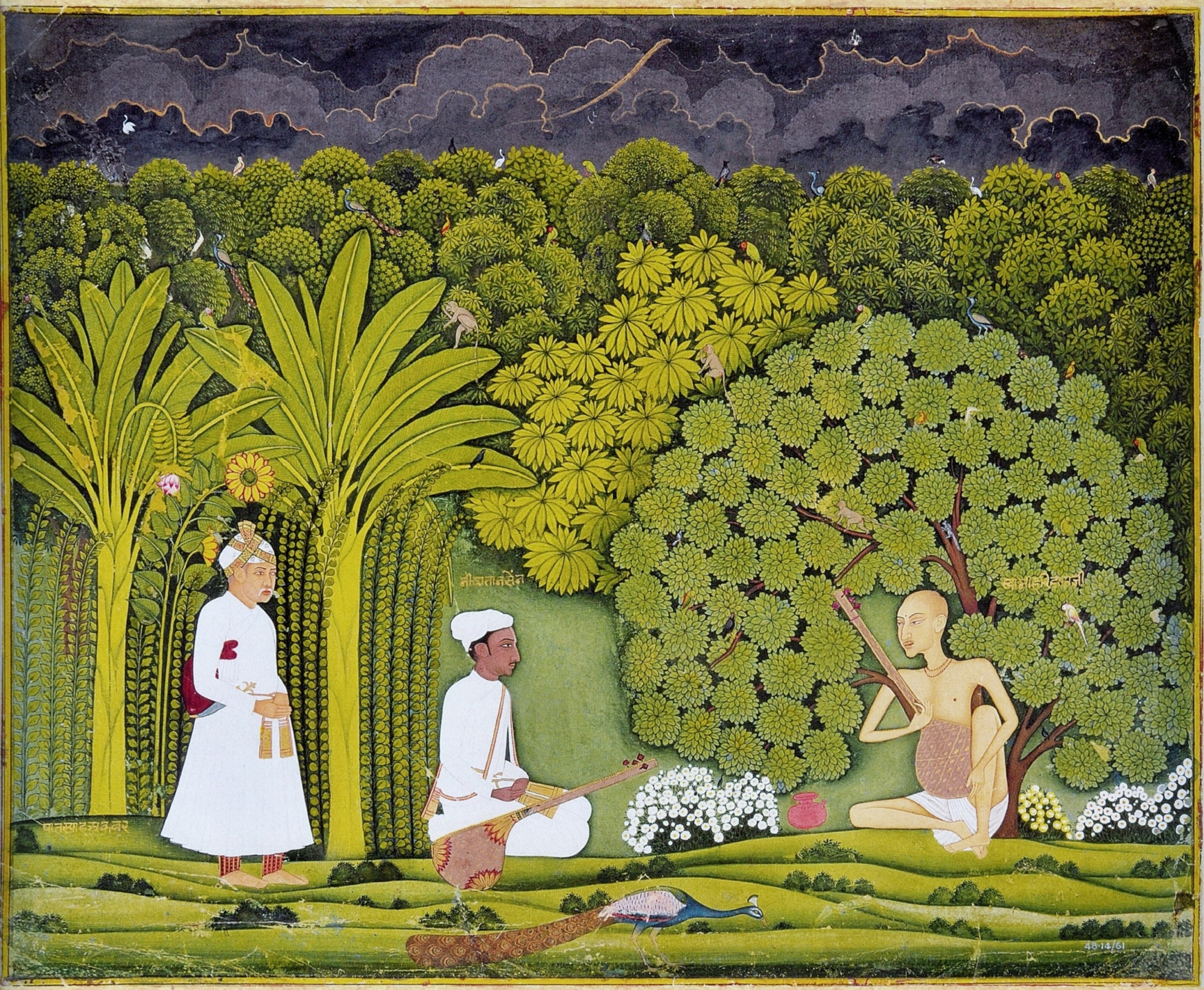
- Swami Haridas teaching Tansen in the presence of Mughal Emperor Akbar.

Background information
- Born: 1478; Gwalior, Tomar dynasty, now Madhya Pradesh, India
- Died: 1573 (aged 94–95) Vrindavan, Mughal Empire now, Uttar Pradesh, India
- Occupation: Court Musician of Gwalior Kingdom
- Works: Various classical music compositions. Author: Kelimal and Ashtadash Siddhanta
- Years active: 1494-1516: As court musician of Raja Man Singh Tomar of Gwalior 1516-1518: As court musician of Vikramaditya Tomar of Gwalior 1518-1573: Bhakti movement, Vrindavan

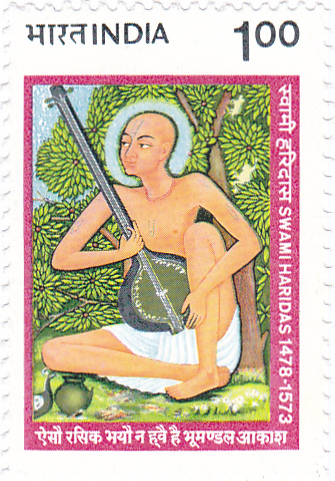
Swami Haridas on a 1985 stamp of India

Swami Haridas (IAST: Svāmī Haridāsa, also spelt Svāmī Haridās) was an Indian spiritual poet and classical musician. He was a Court musician of Raja Man Singh Tomar of Gwalior along with Tansen and Baiju Bawra and is credited with a large body of devotional compositions, especially in the Dhrupad style. He is also the founder of the Haridasi school of mysticism which is still found today in North India. His work influenced both the classical music and the Bhakti movements of North India, especially those devoted to Krishna's consort Radha.

== Biography ==
There are rival versions of the biography of Haridās, since his following was divided in the 1600s among the hereditary householder gosvāmīs and ascetic sādhus. Modern scholars state that he lived in the 1500s. The gosvāmīs claim he was born in Haridāspur and that his father was from Multān, but the sādhus claim he was born in Rājpur next to Vr̥ndāvan. The gosvāmīs claim that his father was Aśudhir, a Sārasvat Brahmin, but the sādhus claim that Haridās was a Sanathya Brahmin and that Haridās was only the pupil of Aśudhir, not his son. The gosvāmīs claim that Haridās was once a married man but later became a sādhu in the Viṣṇusvāmī sampradāya, but the sādhus claim that Haridās was never married and that he was a member of the Nimbārka sampradāya. Modern scholars and historian state that Haridās was born in Gwalior and he likely not initiated into any sect and that he followed his own independent devotional path of sakhībhāva in Nidhiban, although he might have been influenced by the two sects. It is in Nidhiban that he discovered the deity Bāṅke Bihārī, whose worship was later managed by a priest named Jagannāth. The gosvāmīs and sādhus agree that the gosvāmis are the descendants of Jagannāth, who the gosvāmīs claim was the younger brother of Haridās, but the sādhus claim was merely a Sarasvat priest who attended Haridās' Kr̥ṣṇa idol. His most prominent ascetic follower was Viṭṭhal Vipul.

Haridās composed Braj Bhasha poetry, collected in two works called Aṣṭadaś Siddhānta and the Kelimāl. Haridās sung in the dhrupad style, and the content of his work solely consisted of describing and praising the forest līlās of Kr̥ṣṇa-Kuñjbihārī and Rādhā-Śyāmā.

According to popular tradition Haridās was the student of Bhai Mardana, and teacher of Miyān Tānsen, who sang at the court of Akbar. A few scholars dispute this.

== See also ==
- Music of India
- Hindustani classical music
- Achintya Bheda Abheda
- Nidhivan, Vrindavan
