= Madhan =

Madhan may refer to:

== People ==
- Madhan (writer) (born 1947), Indian writer
- Madhan Bob (1953–2025), Indian comedian
- Madhan Karky (born 1980), Indian lyricist, software engineer, and film dialogue writer
- Preet Kaur Madhan, Indian television actress

== Places ==
- Madhan, Iranshahr, a village in Iran

== See also ==
- Madan (disambiguation)
