= Radha Damodar Temple, Vrindavan =

Hindu Temple dedicated to Radha Krishna in Vrindavan

Shri Radha Damodar Temple
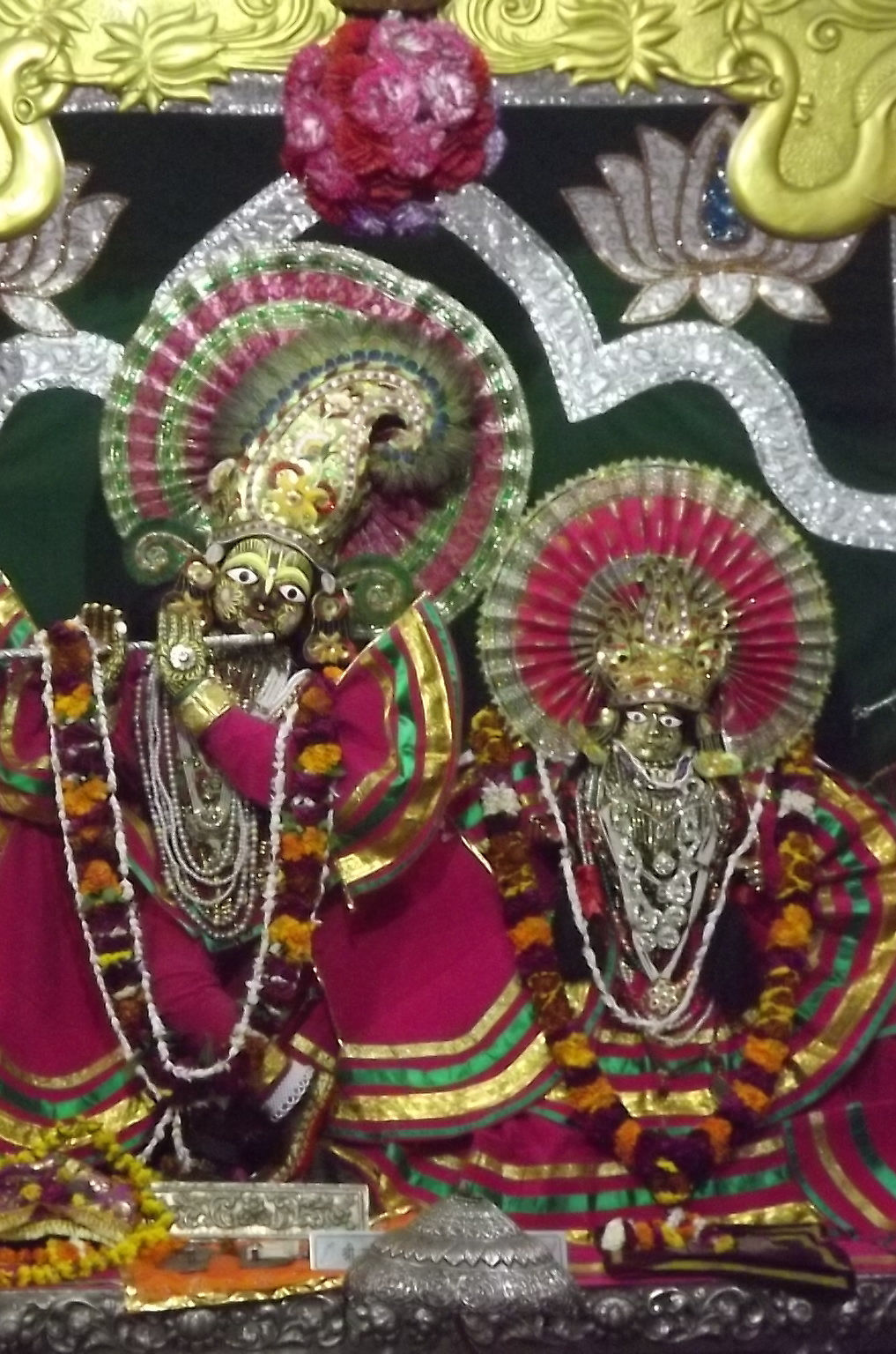
- Radha Krishna murtis at center along with their other forms.

- Location in Uttar Pradesh

Religion
- Affiliation: Hinduism
- District: Mathura
- Deity: Radha Damodar
- Festivals: Janmashtami, Radhashtami, Holi, Sharad Purnima, Kartik Purnima

Location
- Location: Vrindavan
- State: Uttar Pradesh
- Country: India
- Coordinates: 27.5836°N 77.695743°E

Architecture
- Founder: Jiva Goswami
- Completed: 1542 CE

Website
- https://www.radhadamodarmandir.com/

Shri Radha Damodar Temple is a Hindu temple, dedicated to Hindu deities Radha and Krishna. The temple is situated in Vrindavan of Indian state of Uttar Pradesh. In the temple, Krishna is worshiped in the form of Damodar with his consort Radha. It is one of the main seven Goswami temples of Vrindavan. The temple belongs to Gaudiya Vaishnavism tradition and was founded by Jiva Goswami in 1542.

== History ==
Shri Radha Damodar Temple was first established by Jiva Goswami in the year 1542 and was located at Seva Kunj of Vrindavan. Under a farmān of Emperor Akbar dated 6 October 1568, Jiva Goswami was formally recognised as custodian (adhikārī) of the leading Gaudiya temples of Vrindavan. Historians describe Radha Damodar as a daughter-foundation of the neighbouring Govinddev temple.

In 1670, when the Muslim emperor Aurangazeb invaded Vrindavana, the original murtis of Radha Damodar were shifted to Jaipur for some time and when the social conditions became favourable, deities were brought back to Vrindavan in the year 1739. The deities Radha Damodar have been served in Vrindavan since then. But, according to Margaret H. Case, the original murtis of Radha-Damodara worshipped by Jiva Goswami remains enshrined at Jaipur alongside those of Govindadeva, Gopinatha, and Vinodilal, while the Vrindavan shrine houses pratibhū (proxy) images.

Before the disappearance of Jiva Goswami in 1596, he left the deities in the care of his successor Krishna Dasa, the head priest. Jiva drafted a Sanskrit will in 1608, signed by leading Caitanya Vaisnavas, that laid out the management of all Goswami temples; it is the earliest such extant testamentary document known from India. A farmān of Shah Jahan issued on 14 November 1644 subsequently confirmed Krishna Dāsa, described as a devotee of Jiva, in the adhikār (management) to the Vrindavan shrines. Presently, the descendants of Krishna Dasa are serving the deities.

Persian documents preserved at the Vrindavan Research Institute record sustained Mughal revenue-grants to the Gaudiya temples of Vrindavan under Akbar, Jahangir and Shah Jahan; the Radha Damodar temple is, however, notably absent from Akbar's consolidated 1598 grant to thirty-five Mathura-region temples.

== Significance ==
The temple is one of the ancient temples of Vrindavan. It is among the seven significant temples of Vrindavan which includes Radha Madan Mohan temple, Radha Gokulnanda temple, Radha Raman temple, Radha Govinda temple, Radha Gopinath temple and Radha Shyamsundar temple. The temple also houses the Giriraj Shila having the footprints of Krishna which was believed to be given to Sanatana Goswami by Krishna himself. According to popular belief, four parikramas (circumambulation) of the Radha Damodar Temple is equal to one circumambulation of Govardhana Hill.

There are also samadhis of many Gaudiya saints including Rupa Goswami, Jiva Goswami and Krishnadasa Kaviraja inside the premises of the temple.Founder of ISKCON, Srila Prabhupada also stayed in this temple for six years before heading to the United States of America to preach about Krishna.

== Temple deities ==
Along with Radha Damodar and Giriraj Shila, the other deities worshiped in the temple are - Radha Vrindavanchandra, Radha Madhav, Gaur Nitai and Jagannath.

== Temple timings ==
The time zone (UTC+05:30) observed through India by the priest -

Morning - 4:30 AM to 1:00 PM

Evening - 4:30 PM to 9:00 PM

== Gallery ==
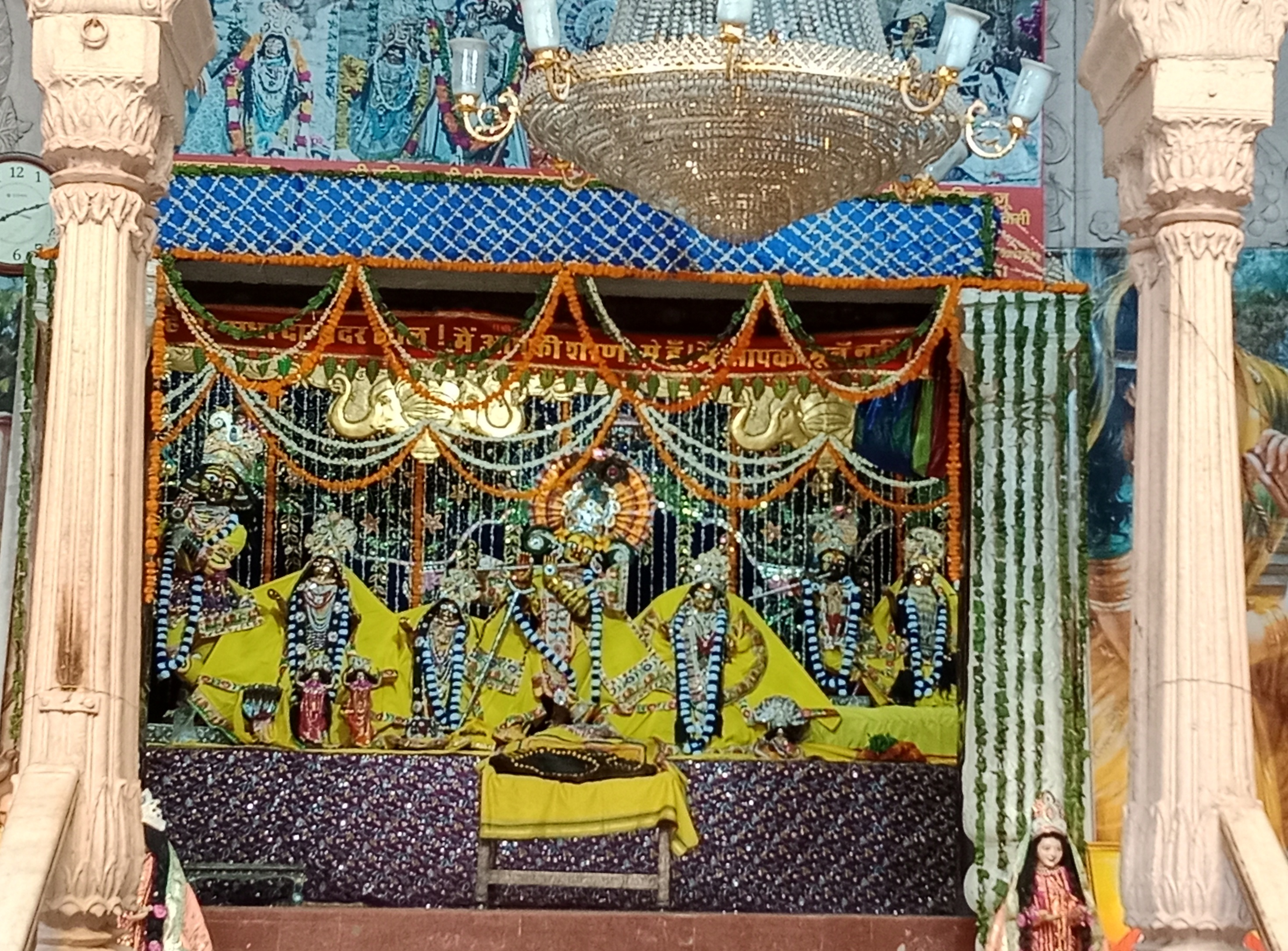
Radha Damodar temple in Vrindavan

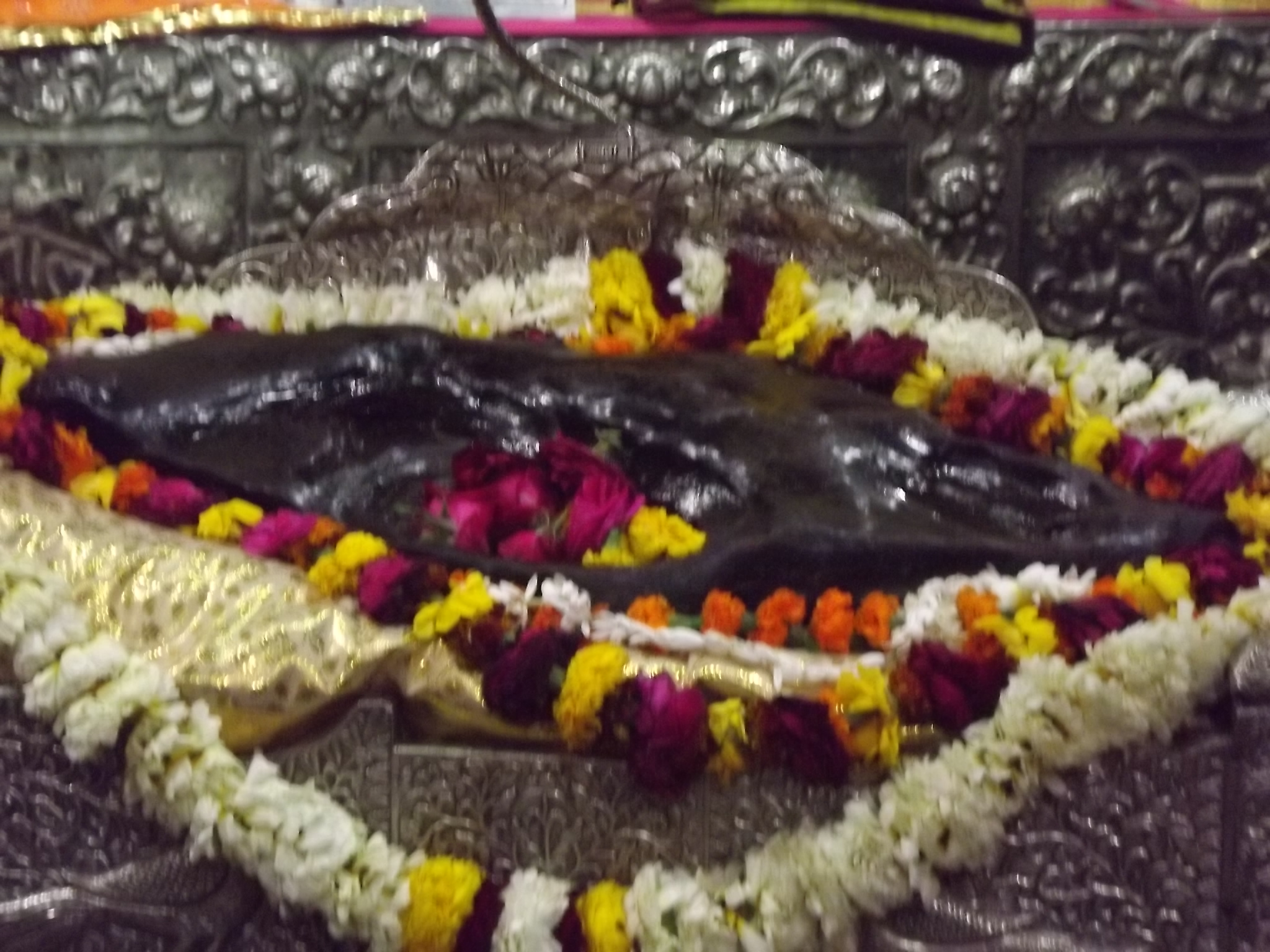
Giriraj Shila inside Radha Damodar temple

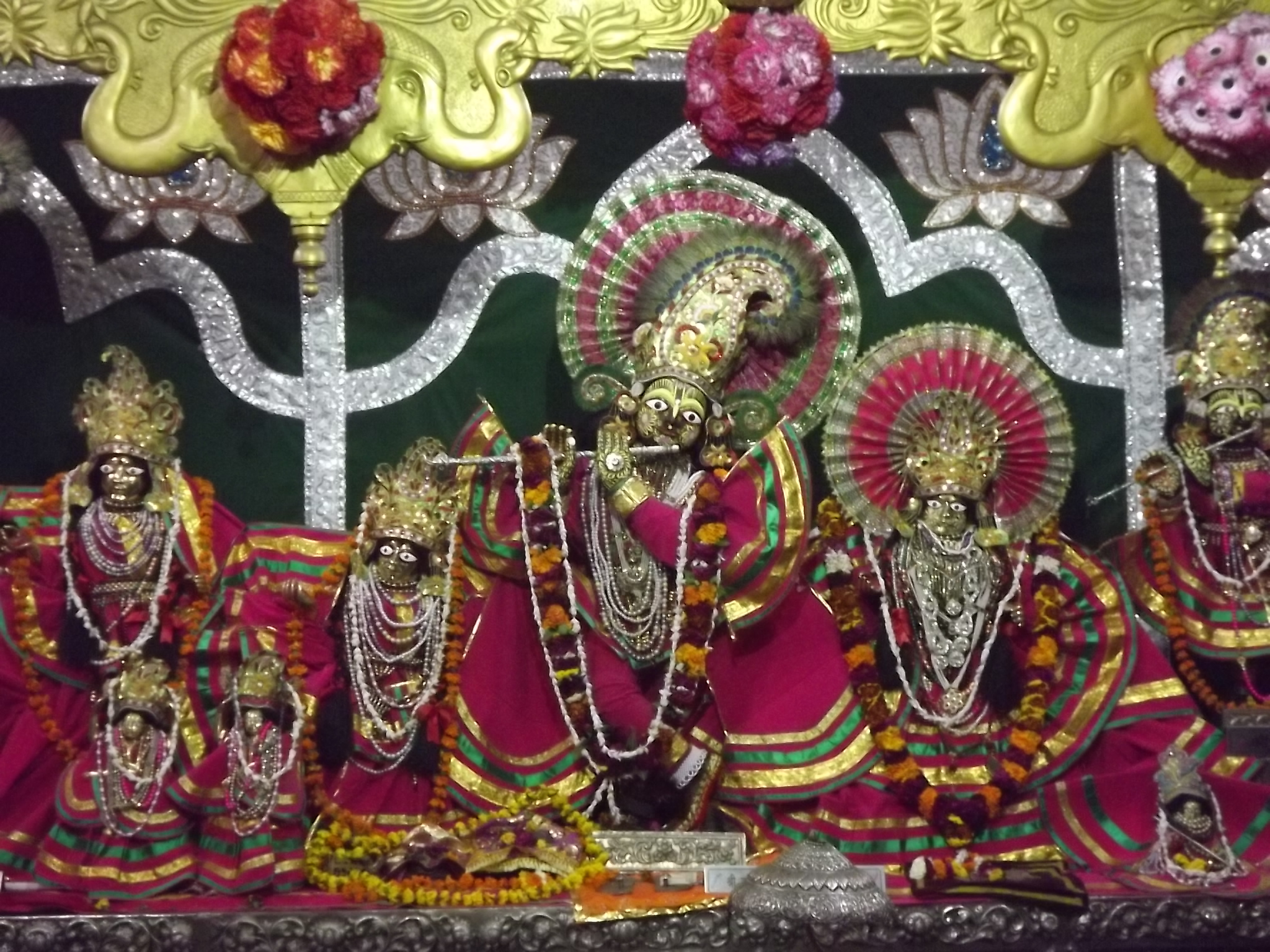
Deities of Radha Damodar Temple

== See also ==
- Radha Kund
- Radha Krishna
- Kusum Sarovar
- Govardhan Shila
- Radha Rani Temple
- Nidhivan, Vrindavan
- Radha Raman Temple
- Radha Damodar Temple, Junagadh
- Radha Vallabh Temple, Vrindavan
- Radha Madan Mohan Temple, Vrindavan
