= Nidhivan, Vrindavan =

Sacred forest site dedicated to Radha and Krishna in Vrindavan, India

Nidhivan
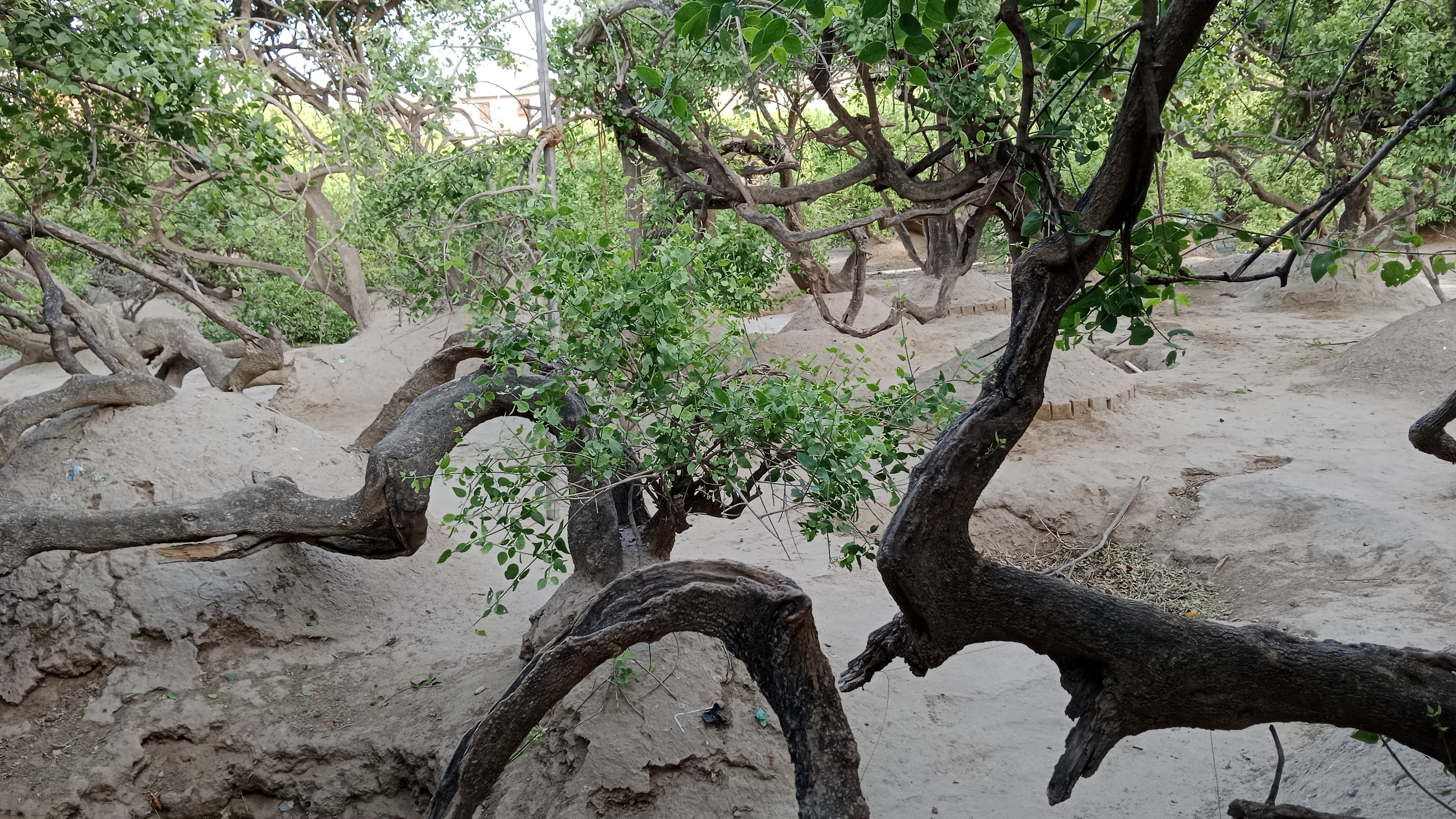
- Dense Tulasi forest of Nidhivan

- Location in Uttar Pradesh

Religion
- Affiliation: Hinduism
- District: Mathura district
- Deity: Radha Krishna
- Festivals: Krishna Janmashtami, Radhashtami, Holi, Sharad Purnima, Kartik Purnima
- Features: Temple tree: Tulasi

Location
- Location: Vrindavan
- State: Uttar Pradesh
- Country: India
- Coordinates: 27.583269°N 77.697643°E

Nidhivan (Hindi: निधिवन meaning, Tulsi Forest) is one of the sacred sites of Vrindavan, situated in the Mathura district, Uttar Pradesh, India. It is considered as the most prominent site dedicated to the pastimes of the Hindu deities Radha and Krishna and their cowherd companions, the Gopikas. It is a common belief among devotees that Nidhivan still witnesses the rasa-lila (dance) of Radha and Krishna during the night and thus, to protect the forest's sanctity, Nidhivan is closed with barricades during the night.

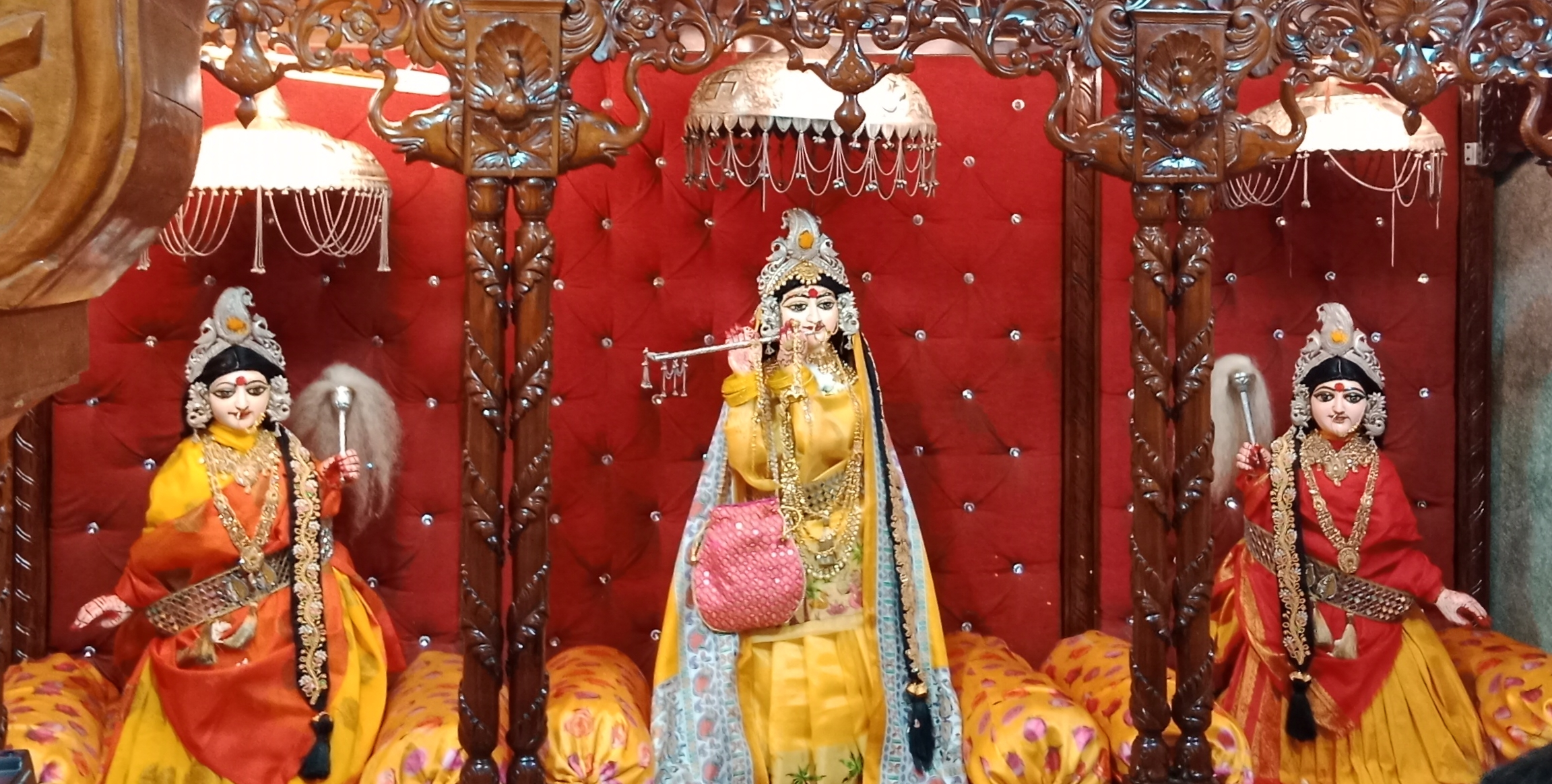
Sri Bansichori Radharani Temple in Nidhivan, the shrine is dedicated to the event when Radha stole Krishna's flute.

The forest has numerous Tulasi trees which are short in height, but are found in pairs and have entangled trunks. Besides the Tulasi plants, the premises also houses a temple called Rang Mahal, where it is believed that Radha and Krishna spend their night after the exhausting dance. Within the premises, there is also another temple called Sri Bansichori Radharani Temple, a shrine dedicated to Swami Haridas who created the Banke Bihari idol, Raslila Sthali where the dance is performed and the Lalita Pond which was believed to be made by Krishna himself, when the cowherds asked for water amidst of their tiring dance.

== Features ==
=== Tulasi Plants ===
Nidhivan is considered one of the mysterious places of Vrindavan. It is a dense forest with lush green trees, primarily Tulasi, which is considered a holy plant in Vaishnavism. The interesting thing is that the bark of the trees is hollow and the land is dry, but the tree remains loaded with green leaves throughout the year. All the trees are in a bending position towards the ground. Many monkeys and peacocks inhabit the area. The common belief is that these trees turn into the gopi cowherds in the night to perform the Raslila dance, before returning from their original form at dawn. Every plant on the premises is found in pairs signifying the pair of the cowherds and Krishna.

=== Rang Mahal ===
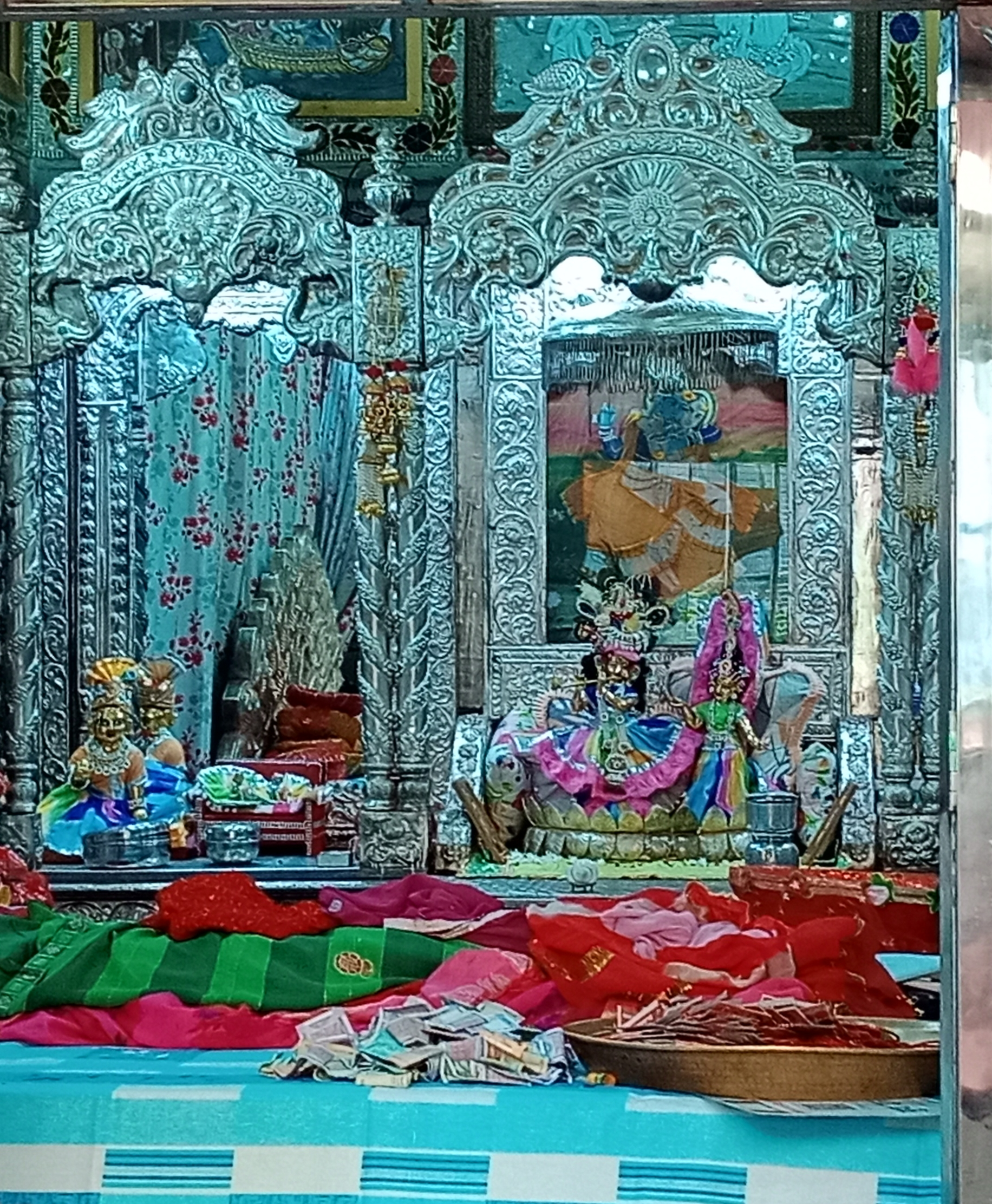
Inside the Rang Mahal depicting the main altar for Radha and Krishna. The disarranged clothes and bangles are seen on the ground.

Rang Mahal, meaning Colourful Palace, is another temple in Nidhivan, known as the place where Radha was dressed up by Krishna. It is believed, that every night, Radha and Krishna themselves come to this palace to relax after their exhausting dance. The temple has sandalwood beds for sleeping. Every evening, before closing the temple gates, the temple priests make the bed, place ornaments like bangles, flowers and clothes for Radha, Tulasi leaves, Neem twigs to be used as toothbrushes, sweets and betel nuts and leaves to eat, and a jar full of water beside the bed. After all the arrangements are made by the priests, the main doors of the Rang Mahal and Nidhivan are locked from the outside and unlocked only in the morning. But every morning, they find that the bed looks as if someone has slept on it, the Neem twigs look used and the sweets and betel leaves look like they were partially eaten by someone. Also, the bangles, flowers and clothes look used, disordered and disarranged.

No one is allowed inside the premises of the temple after the sun sets down. It is believed that Radha and Krishna come to the temple every night to rest. Anyone who tries to trespass Nidhivan to see what happens in the night either dies or loses their eyesight and mentality. Although the houses built in the vicinity of Nidhivan have access to the view of the area, no one dares to attempt to do so. Many people who live in the vicinity have sealed their windows with bricks and those who have open windows, also close them down after the final aarti in the evening. Many of them also claimed to hear the sounds of anklets coming from Nidhivan at night. Even the monkeys and peacocks leave the Nidhivan temple after the sunset. Some people have also claimed to see Krishna himself in his divine form as a teenage cowherd, wearing yellow clothes and jewellery, a crown with a peacock feather attached to it, and playing the flute.

=== Appearance of Banke Bihari ===
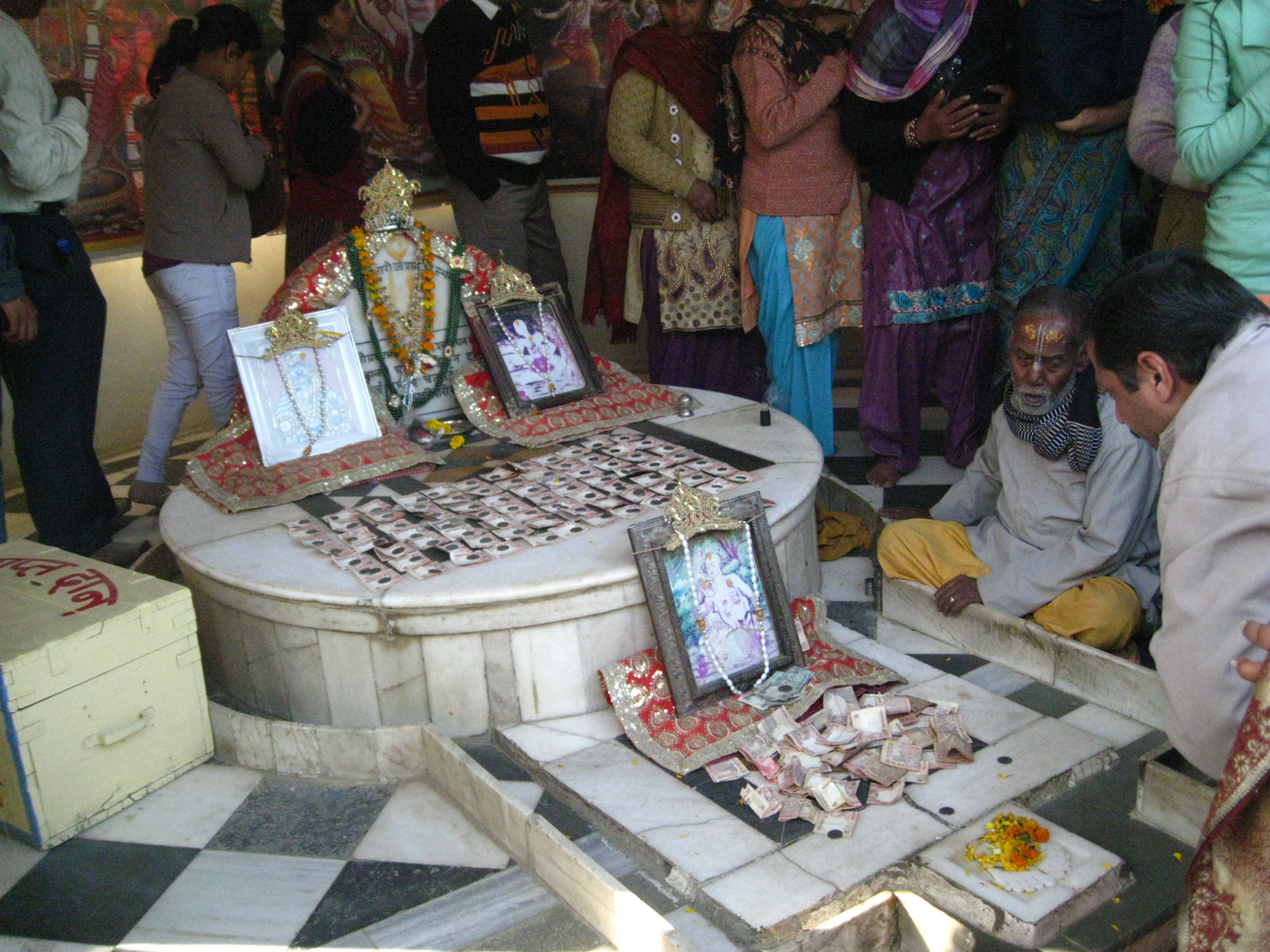
The place where the Banke Bihari idol appeared for Swami Haridas in Nidhivan.

Nidhivan is also considered the place of appearance of the Banke Bihari idol. It is said that the saint Swami Haridas with his sheer devotion and dedication, propitiated Radha and Krishna and they appeared in front of him. Later, both Radha and Krishna formed an idol called Banke Bihari to stay with Haridas. For a few years, Banke Bihari was worshipped in Nidhivan and then it was enshrined in a separate shrine.

== Gallery ==
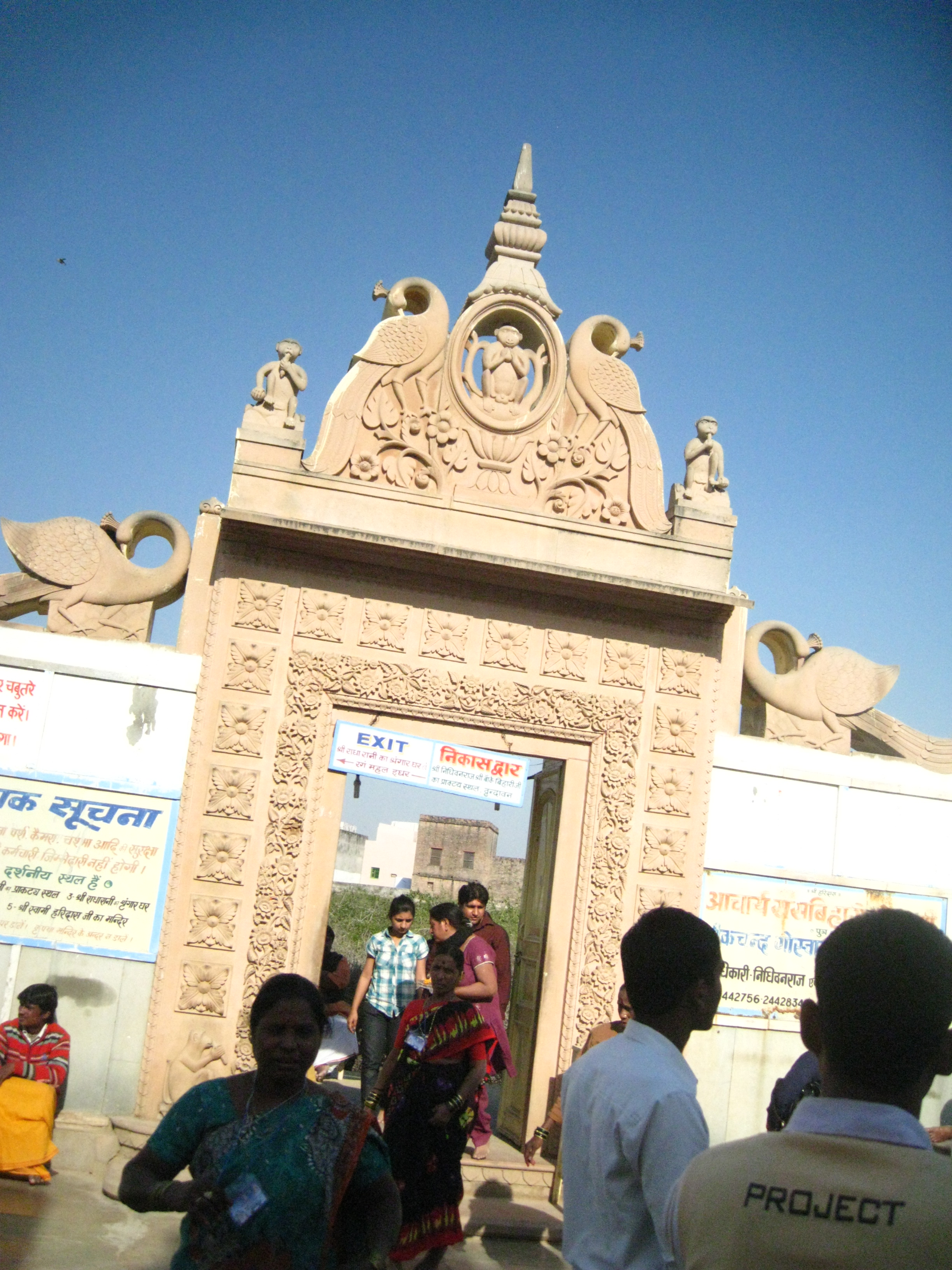
The main entrance gate of Nidhivan.

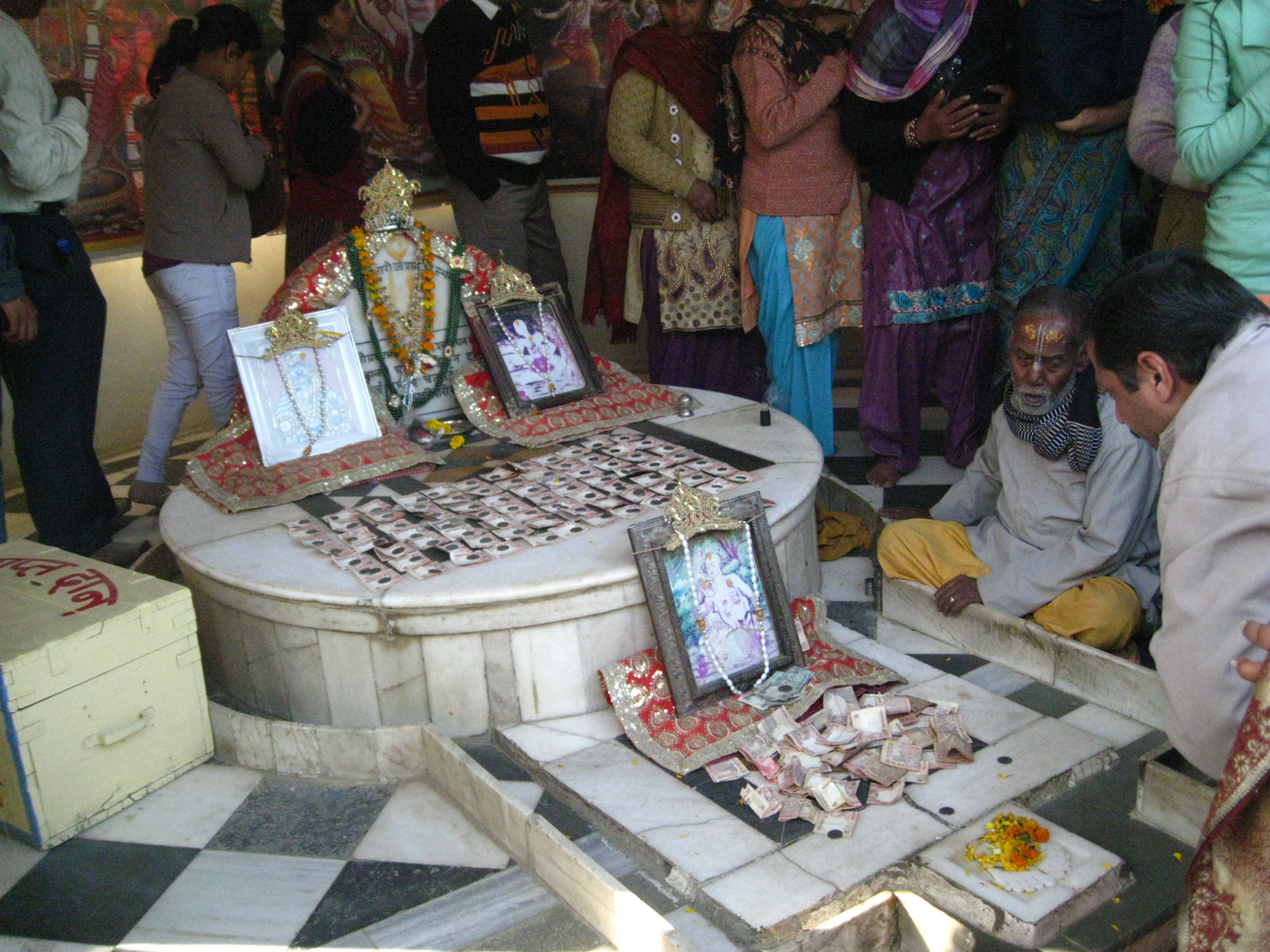
The place where the Banke Bihari idol appeared for Swami Haridas in Nidhivan.

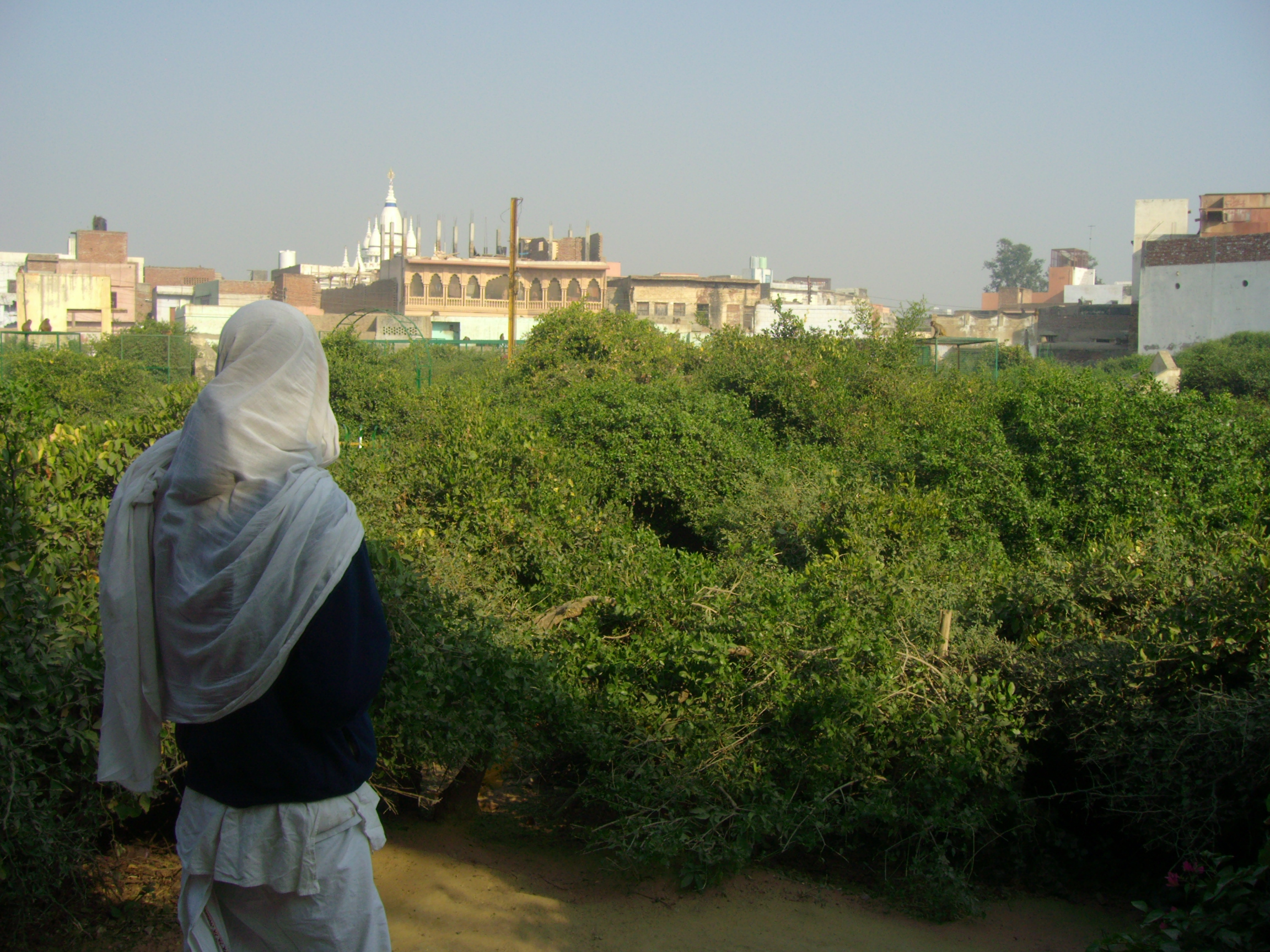
View of the Seva Kunj adjoining Nidhivan.

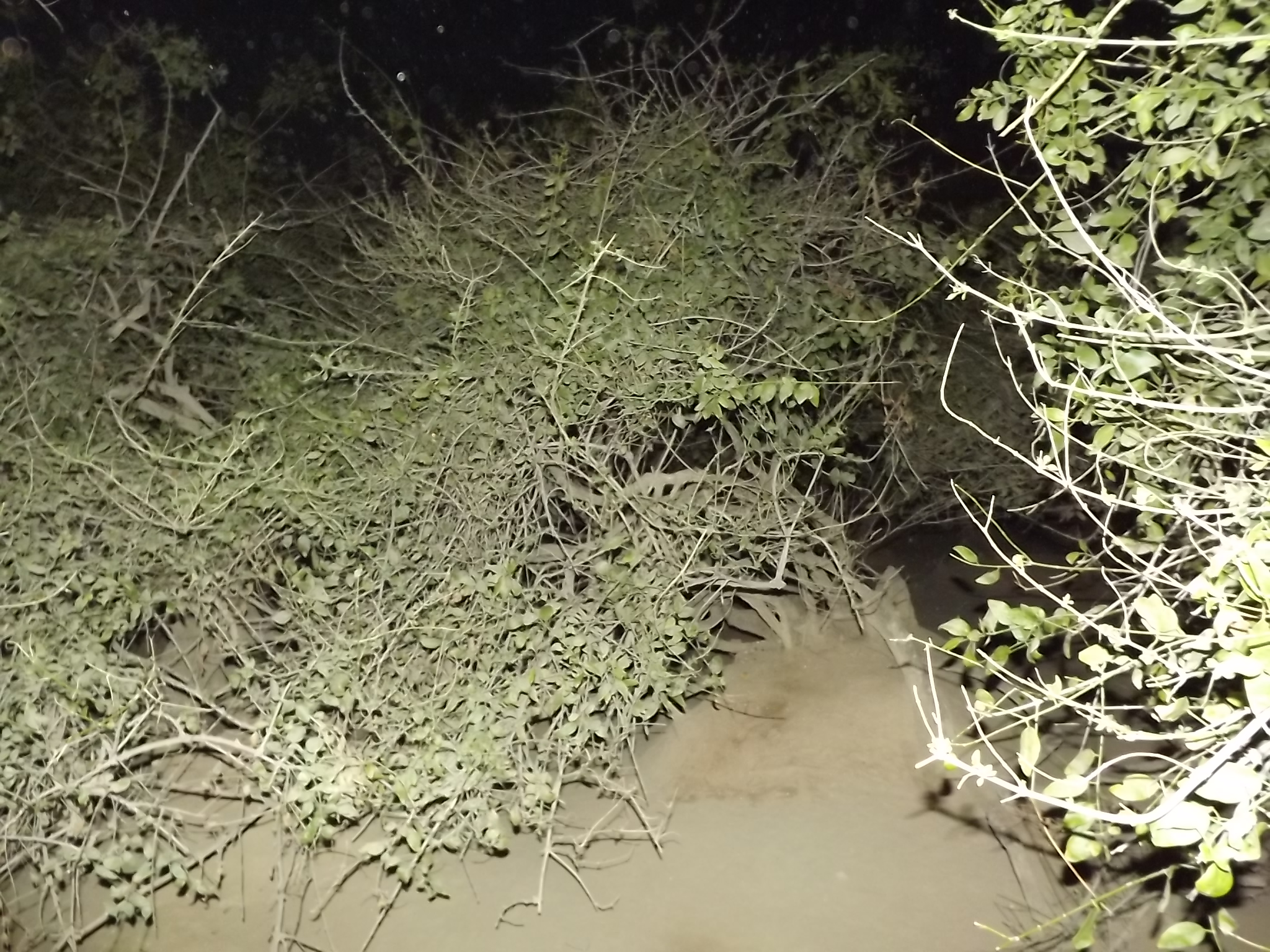
Inside the forest at night.

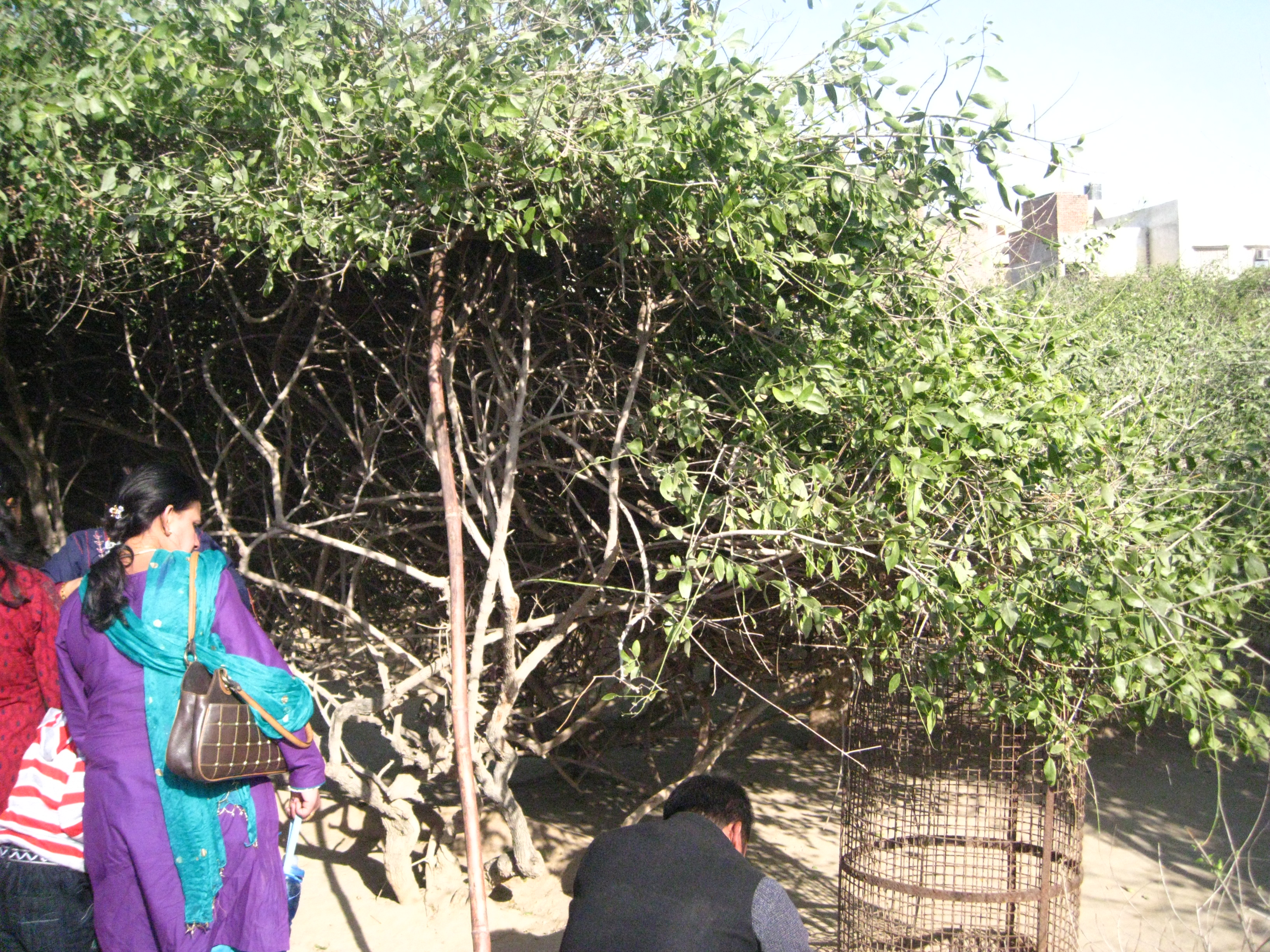
The tulasi plants in Nidhivan

== Timings ==
The time zone (UTC+05:30) observed through India by the priest.

Summer Timings - 05:00 am to 08:00 pm.(Closed Between 1.00PM to 3.30 PM)

Winter Timings - 06:00 am to 07:00 pm.(Closed Between 1.00PM to 3.30 PM)

== Nearby attractions ==
- Seva Kunj
- Banke Bihari Temple
- Radha Raman Temple
- Radha Damodar Temple
- Radha Gopinath Temple
- Radha Vallabh Temple
- Gopeshwar Mahadev
- Mote ganesh ji

== See also ==
- Gopis
- Krishna Balrama Temple
- Prem Mandir
- Radha Krishna
- Radha Krishna Vivah Sthali, Bhandirvan
- Radha Madan Mohan Temple
- Radha Rani Temple
- Raslila
