= Madan Mohan (disambiguation) =

Madan Mohan is a form of the god Krishna in Hinduism.

Madan Mohan may also refer to:

- Madan Mohan (cricketer) (1945-2020), Indian cricketer
- Madan Mohan (music director) (1924–1975), Indian (Bollywood) music director
- Madan Mohan Lakhera (born 1937), Governor of Mizoram, India 2006–2011
- Madan Mohan Malaviya (1861–1946), Indian freedom fighter
- Madan Mohan Mishra (1931–2013), Nepalese author
- Madan Mohan Mittal (born 1935), Indian politician
- Madan Mohan Punchhi (1933–2015), Chief Justice of India
- Madan Mohan Sabharwal (1936–2011), Indian businessman and social worker
- Madanmohan Tarkalankar (1817–1858), Bengali poet and scholar
- Ananthula Madan Mohan (–2004), Indian politician

== Other Place ==
- Madan Mohan College, Sylhet, Bangladesh

== See also ==
- Madan Mohan Temple (disambiguation)
