= Madin, Jiroft =

Madin مدين
- Village
- Location within Iran
- Coordinates: 29°00′46″N 57°41′05″E
- Country: Iran
- Province: Kerman
- County: Jiroft
- Bakhsh: Sarduiyeh
- Rural District: Dalfard

Population (2006)
  - Total: 101
- Time zone: UTC+3:30 (IRST)
  - Summer (DST): UTC+4:30 (IRDT)

Madin (Persian: مدين, also Romanized as Madīn) is a village in Dalfard Rural District, Sarduiyeh District, Jiroft County, Kerman Province, Iran. At the 2006 census, its population was 101, in 20 families.
