= Mad'an (slave) =

Mad'an (ميداس) was a slave of Muhammad mentioned in the Hadith.

He was an African slave given to Muhummad in 628 AD by a man called Rifa'ah bin Zaid, from the Banu Ad-Dubaib.

Mad'an was shot by an arrow at a place called Wadi al-Qura (Wadi al-'Ula), 360 km north of Medina, for stealing a cloak from the spoils of war at the Battle of Khaybar.
