= Qaderabad, Hirmand =

Qaderabad قادر آباد
- Village
- Location within Iran
- Coordinates: 31°10′06″N 61°45′57″E
- Country: Iran
- Province: Sistan and Baluchestan
- County: Hirmand
- Bakhsh: Central
- Rural District: Dust Mohammad

Population (2006)
  - Total: 213
- Time zone: UTC+3:30 (IRST)
  - Summer (DST): UTC+4:30 (IRDT)

Qaderabad (Persian: قادر آباد, also Romanized as Qāderābād; also known as Mādīn and Deh-e Mādīn) is a village in Dust Mohammad Rural District, in the Central District of Hirmand County, Sistan and Baluchestan Province, Iran. At the 2006 census, its population was 213, in 32 families.
