= Radha Madan Mohan Temple, Vrindavan =

Hindu temple dedicated to Radha Krishna in Vrindavan

Shri Radha Madan Mohan Temple
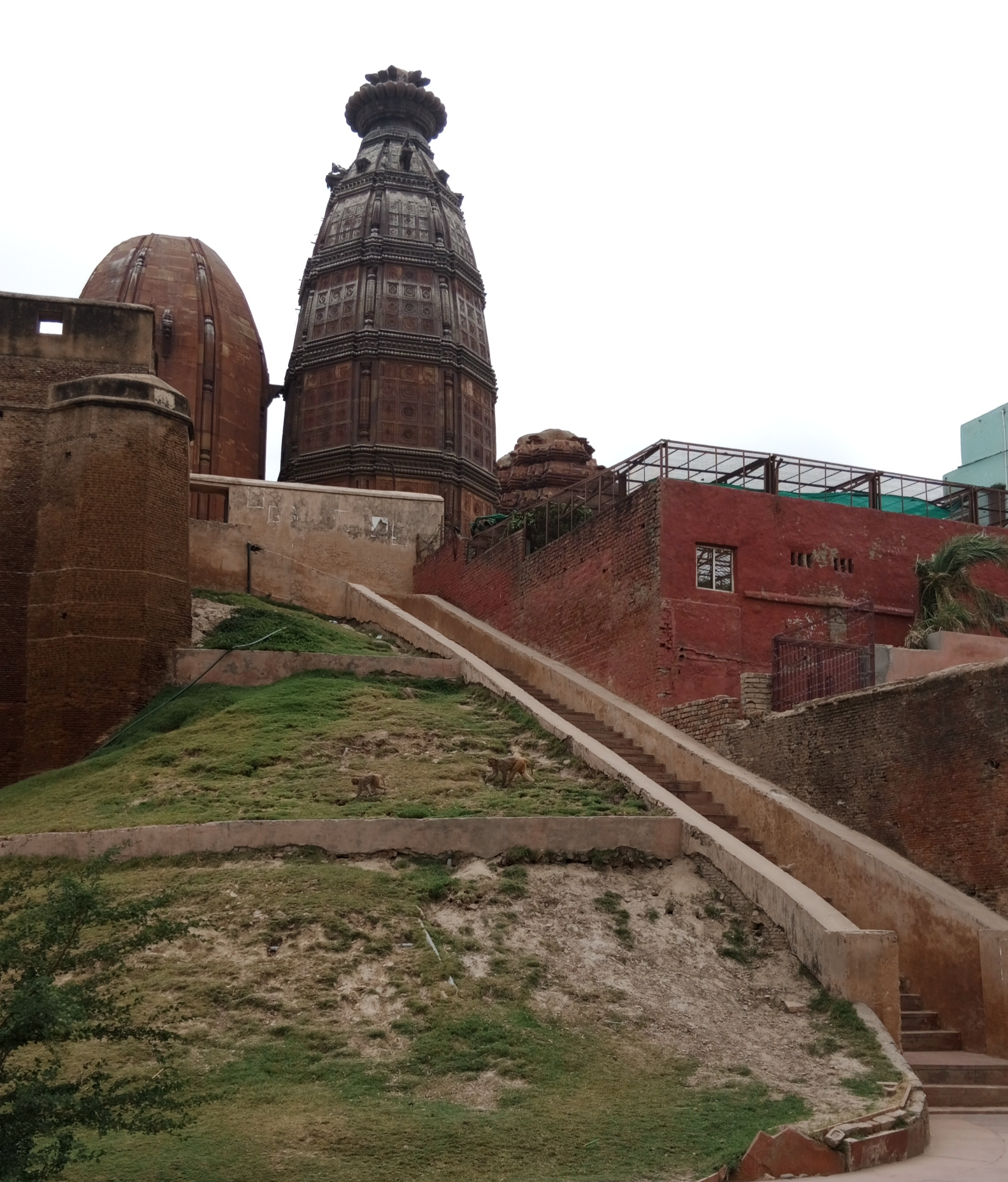
- Radha Madan Mohan Temple, Vrindavan.

- Location in Uttar Pradesh

Religion
- Affiliation: Hinduism
- District: Mathura
- Deity: Radha Madanmohan
- Festivals: Janmashtami, Radhashtami, Holi, Gopashtami, Sharad Purnima, Kartik Purnima

Location
- Location: Vrindavan
- Coordinates: 27.57976°N 77.69051°E

Architecture
- Style: Nagara
- Founder: Sanatana Goswami, Kapur Ram Das
- Completed: 1580 AD

Specifications
- Height (max): 50 fts
- Materials: Red sandstone

Shri Radha Madan Mohan Temple, also referred as Madan Mohan Temple. is a 16th-century Hindu temple situated in Vrindavan of Indian state of Uttar Pradesh. It is one of the oldest and highly revered temple of Vrindavan. The presiding deity of the temple is Madan Mohan, a form of the god Krishna who is present in the central altar of the temple with his consort goddess Radha and Lalita gopi on either sides of him. The temple is one of the earliest temples of Vrindavan which has architectural influences from existing Mughal architecture as well as Kalinga Nagara Style of Indian Temple Architecture.

The temple is built in the Nagara style of architecture. On the bank of Yamuna River, Radha Madan Mohan Temple stands at a height of 50 feet near Kaliya Ghat. It is also one of the most popular Goswami shrines in Uttar Pradesh.

== History ==
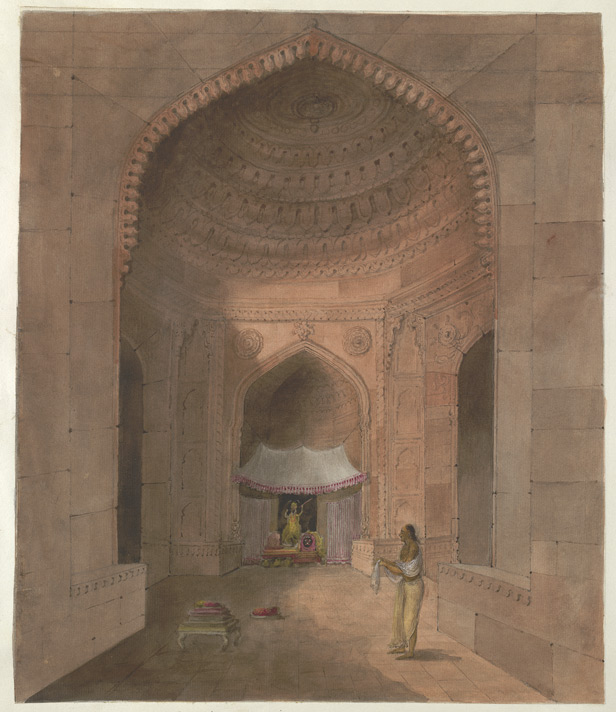
Interior of the Madan Mohan temple, c.1814-15.

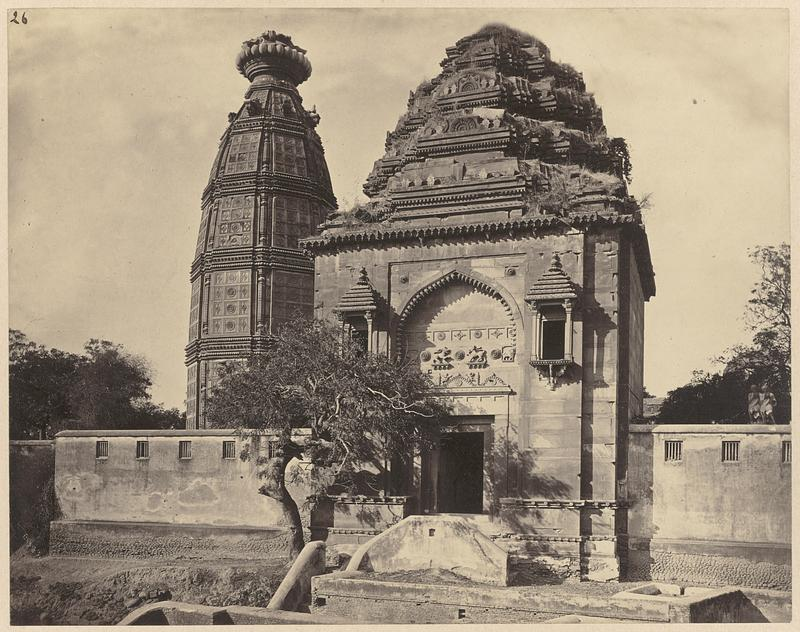
Original main entrance to the Radha Madan Mohan Temple, in 1860s.

According to popular folklore, the Shri Radha Madan Mohan temple in Vrindavan is said to be 5,000 years old. It was first believed to be constructed by the great-grandson of Krishna-Vajranabh. However, with time, deities were lost. Later, the deity of Madan Mohan was discovered at the base of an old banyan tree by Advaita Acharya, when he visited Vrindavan. He entrusted the worship of Madana Mohan to his disciple, Purusottama Chaube, who then gave the deity to Sanatana Goswami. It is the deity saint Mira Bai worshipped during her stay at Vrindavan.

According to historical sources, it was in 1580 AD that this temple was rebuilt under the guidance of Sri Sanatana Goswami by a Multan trader, Kapur Ram Das. As the temple was invaded by the Mughal emperor Aurangzeb in 1670 AD, the original idol of Madan Mohan was secretly shifted to Jaipur by King Jai Singh overnight before the attack of Aurangzeb on Vrindavan and Mathura temples. Later, the deities are shifted to Karauli by King Gopal Singh. The original deities of Shri Radha Madan Mohan temple are presently installed in Madan Mohan temple of Karauli, Rajasthan.

The original deity of Madan Mohan is said to exactly resemble Krishna from the waist down. In 1748 AD, a replica of Madan Mohan was established in the Madan Mohan temple, Vrindavan. In 1819 AD, Nanda Kumar Basu, a zamindar from Baharu, rebuilt the temple at the top of the hill near the Yamuna river. Presently, Shri Radha Madan Mohan temple of Vrindavan houses the replica of the original deities, which are installed in the Madan Mohan temple, Karauli.

== Architecture ==
Shri Radha Madan Mohan temple has the Nagara style of architecture. It is built in an oval shape with red sandstone. The temple is 20 meters high and is situated near the river Yamuna.

== Temple timings ==
The time zone (UTC+05:30) observed in India by the priest.

- Winter Timings: Morning 7:00 am to 12:00 pm, Evening 4:00 pm to 8:00 pm.
- Summer Timings : Morning 6:00 am to 11:00 am, Evening 5:00 pm to 9:30 pm.

== Gallery ==
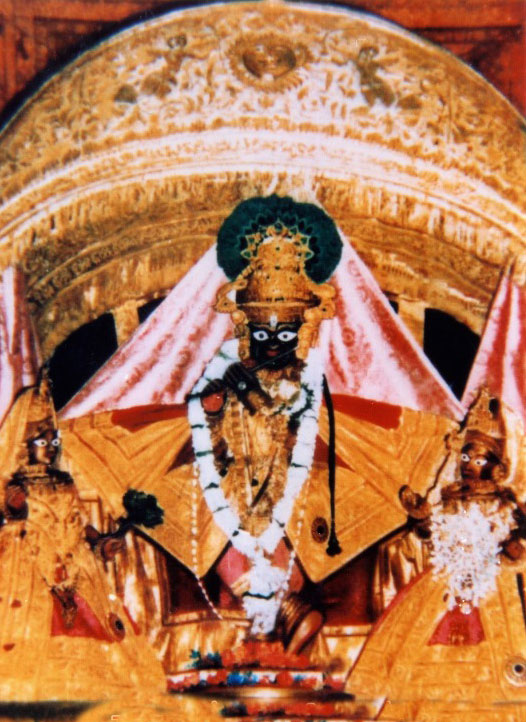
Original murtis of Radha(right), Krishna (at center), Lalita Gopi (left) at Madan Mohan Temple, Karauli.

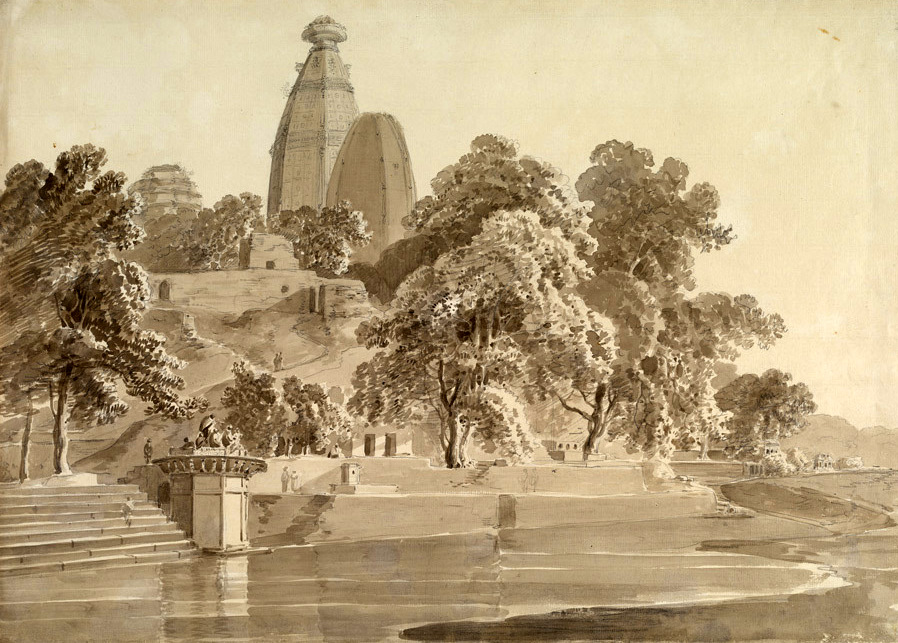
Pencil art depicting Shri Radha Madan Mohan temple on banks of Yamuna, 1789.

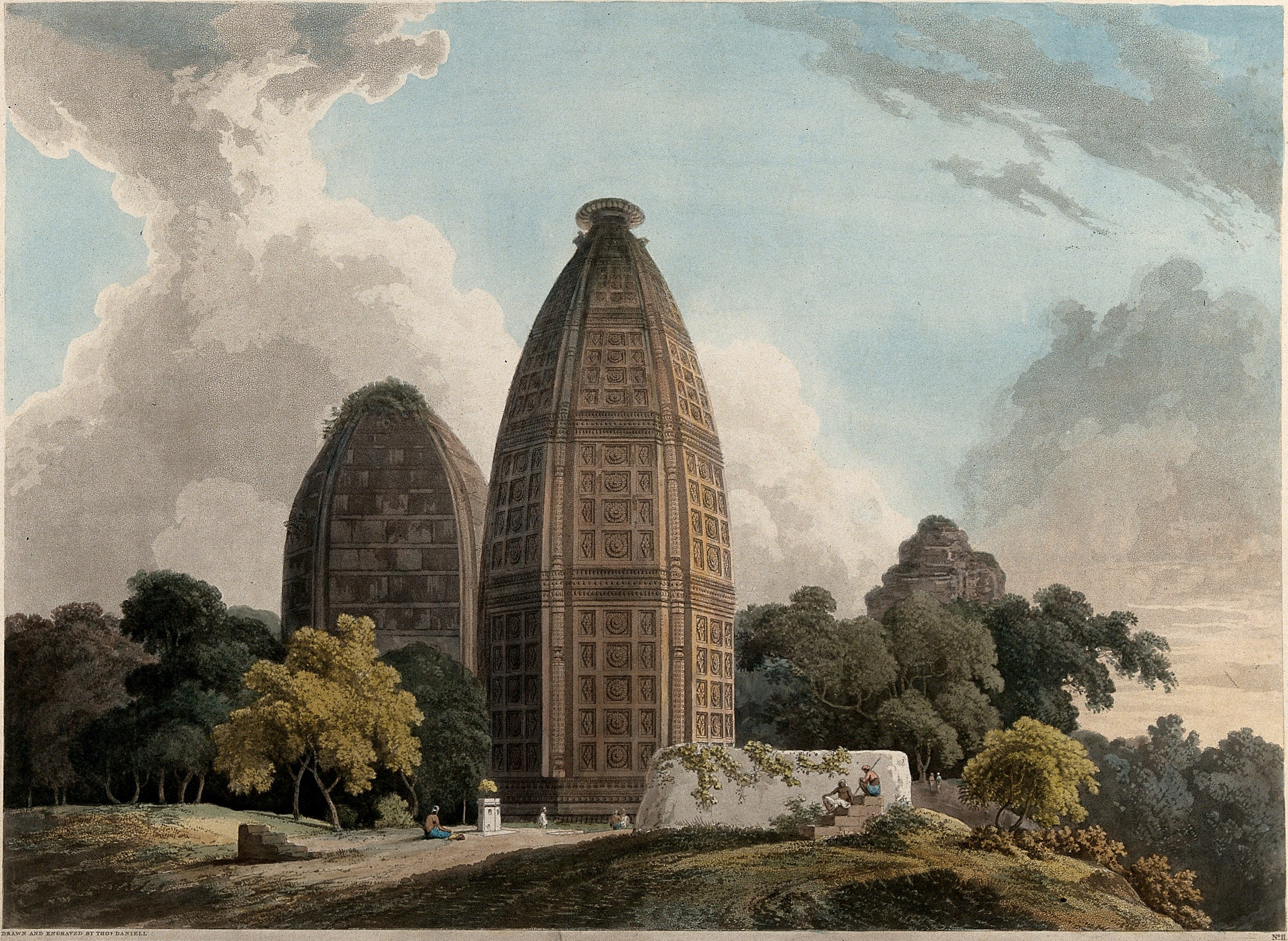
Madan Mohan Temple, 1795.

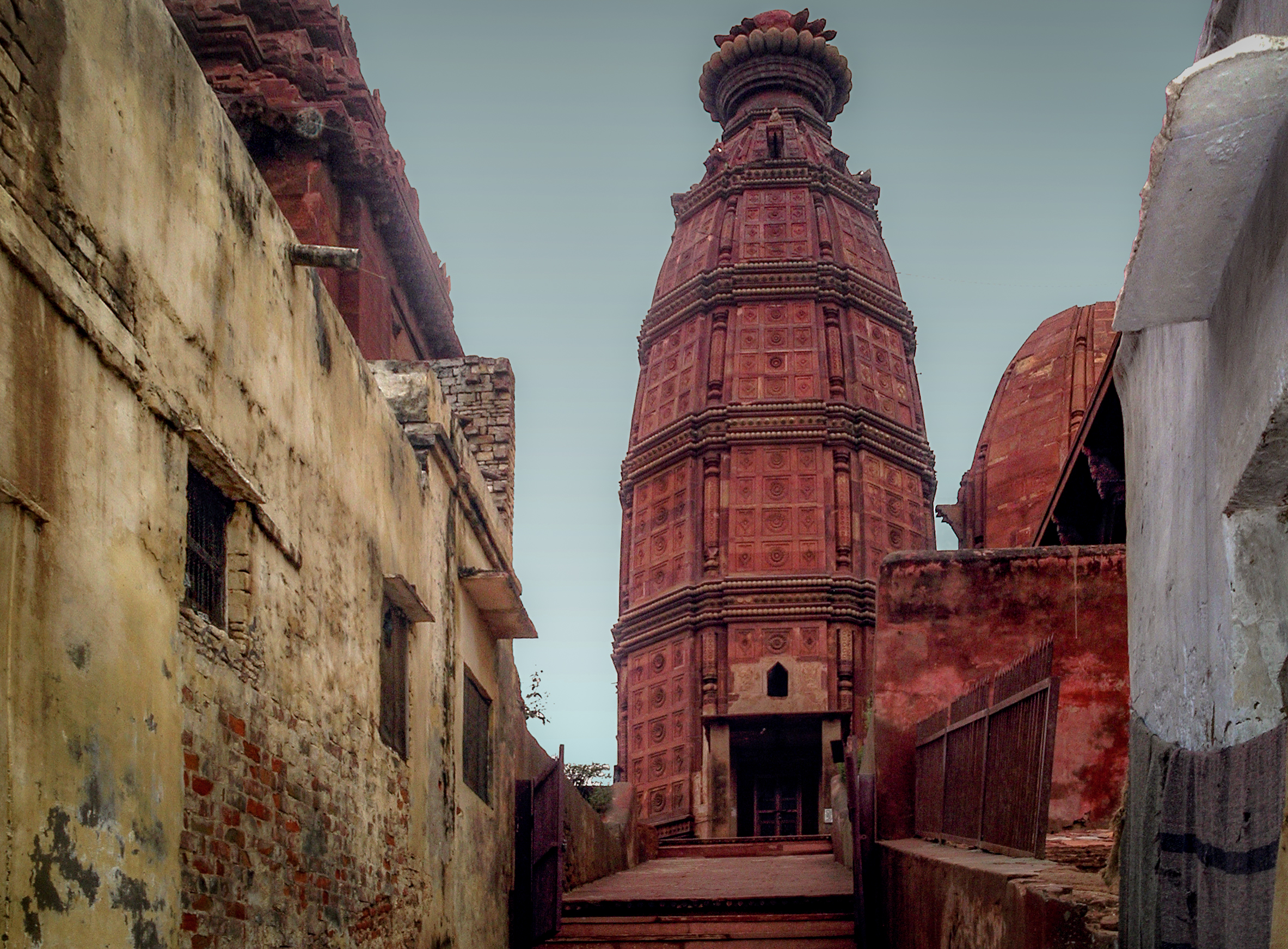
Outer structure of Shri Radha Madan Mohan temple, Vrindavan.

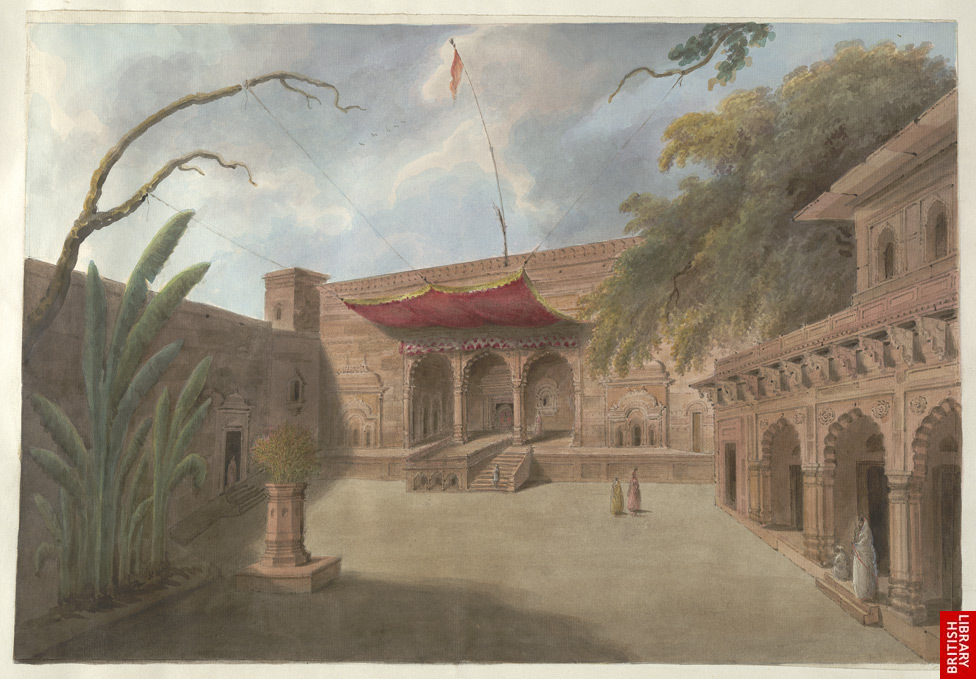
Interior of the Shri Radha Madan Mohan temple, a watercolor by Seeta Ram, c.1814-15.

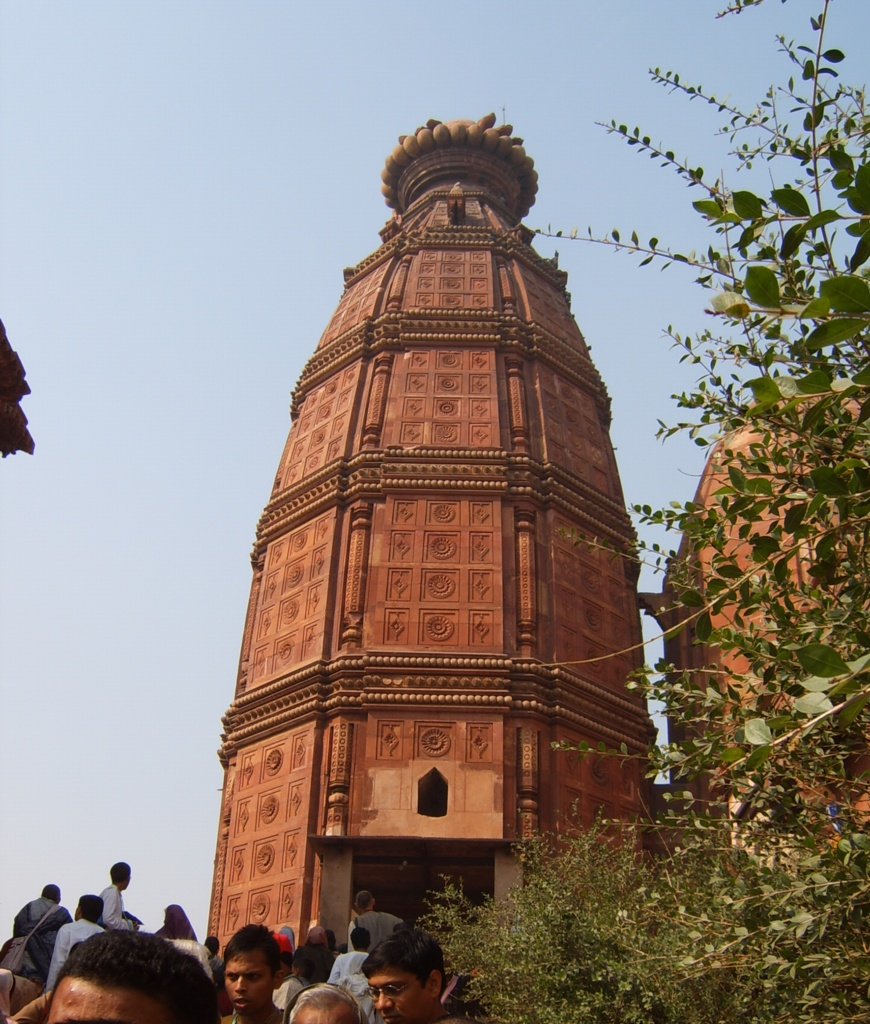
Front view of temple.

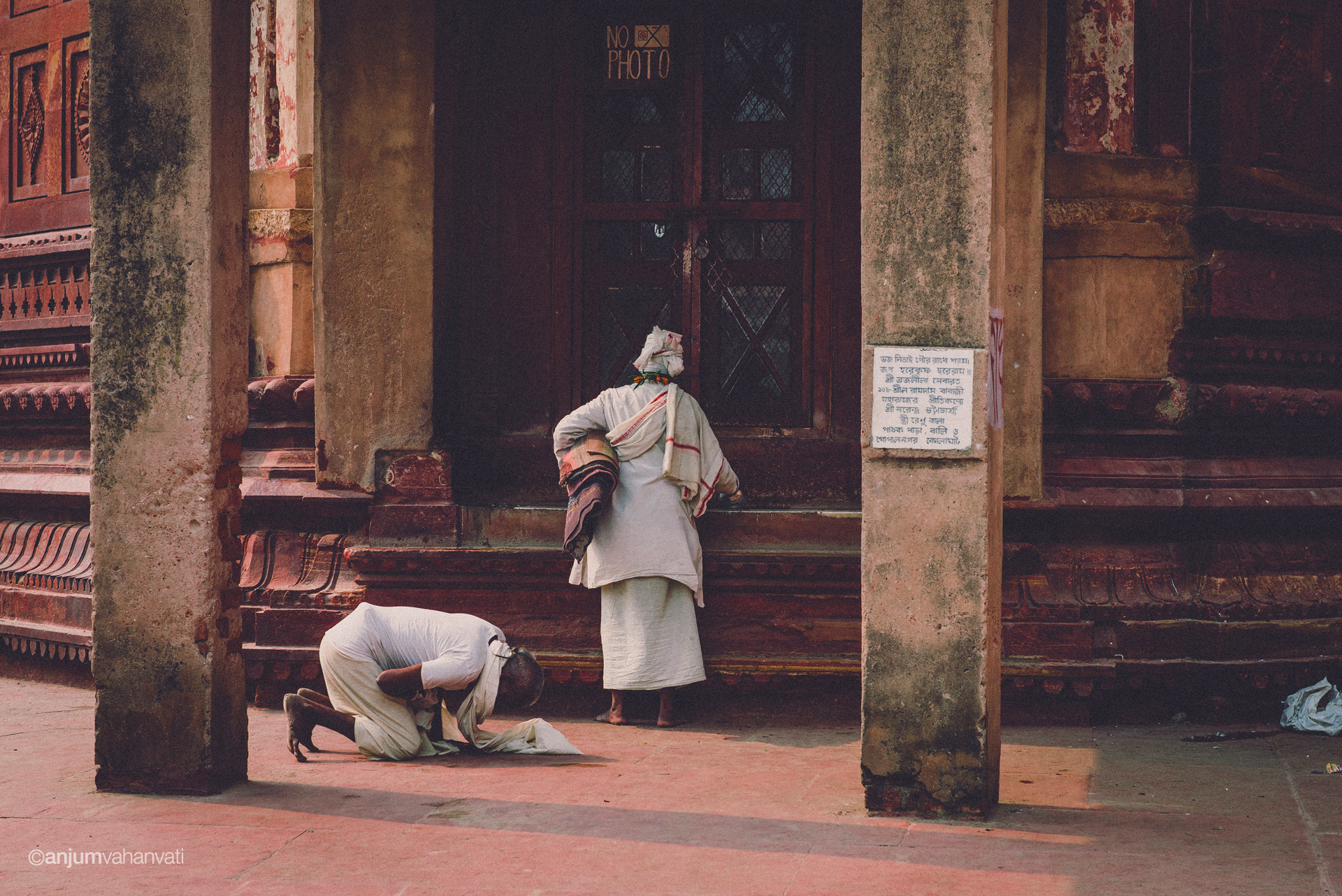
Devotees worshiping inside the premises of temple.

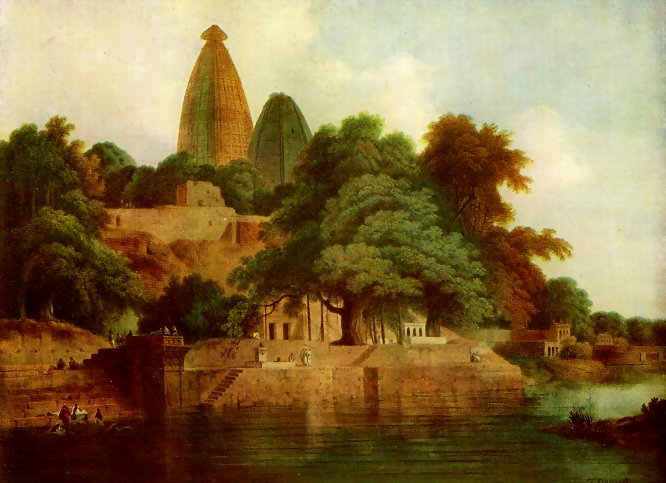
Shri Radha Madan Mohan temple, Vrindavan 1789 painting.

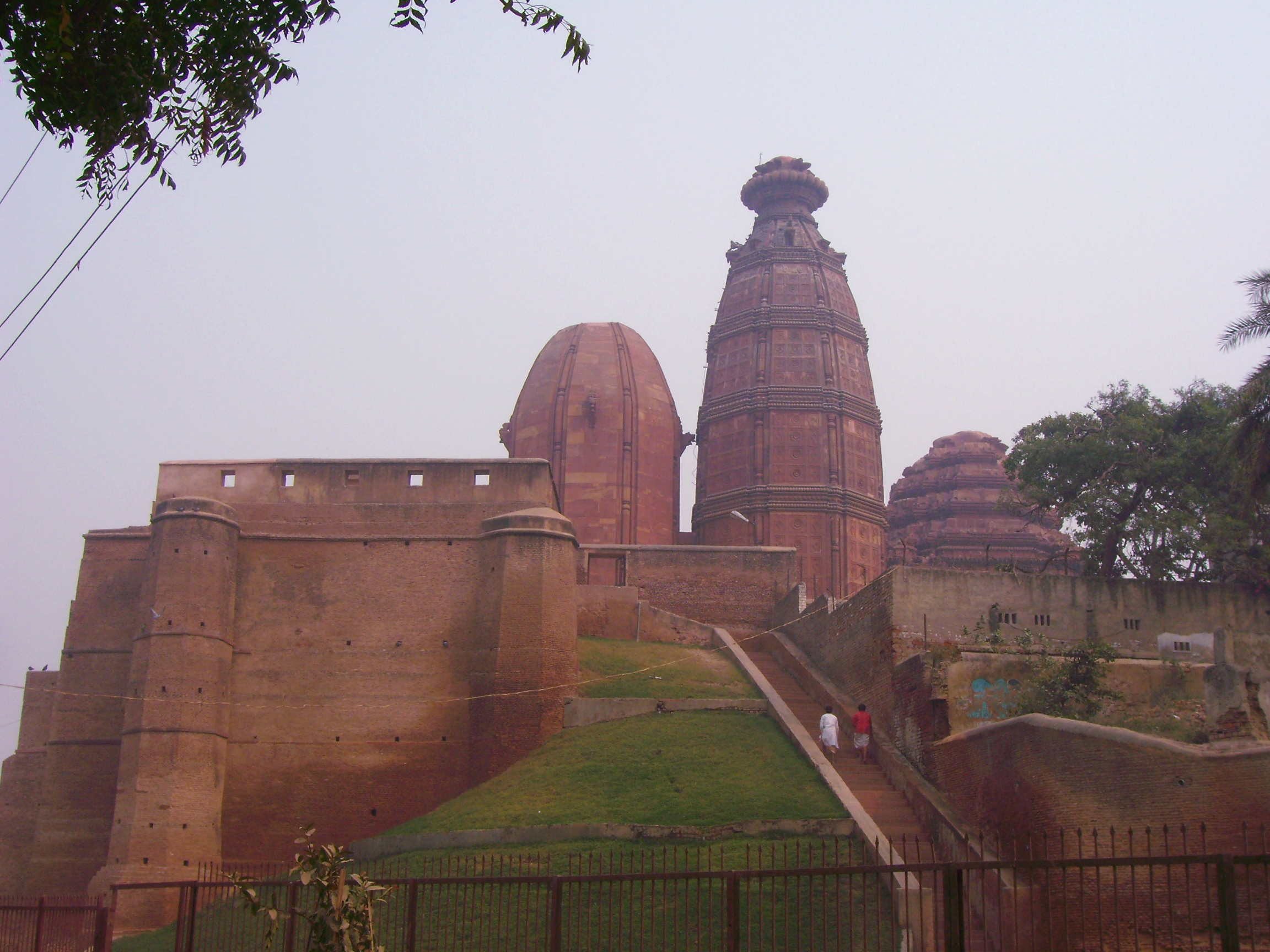
Radha Madan Mohan temple in Vrindavan

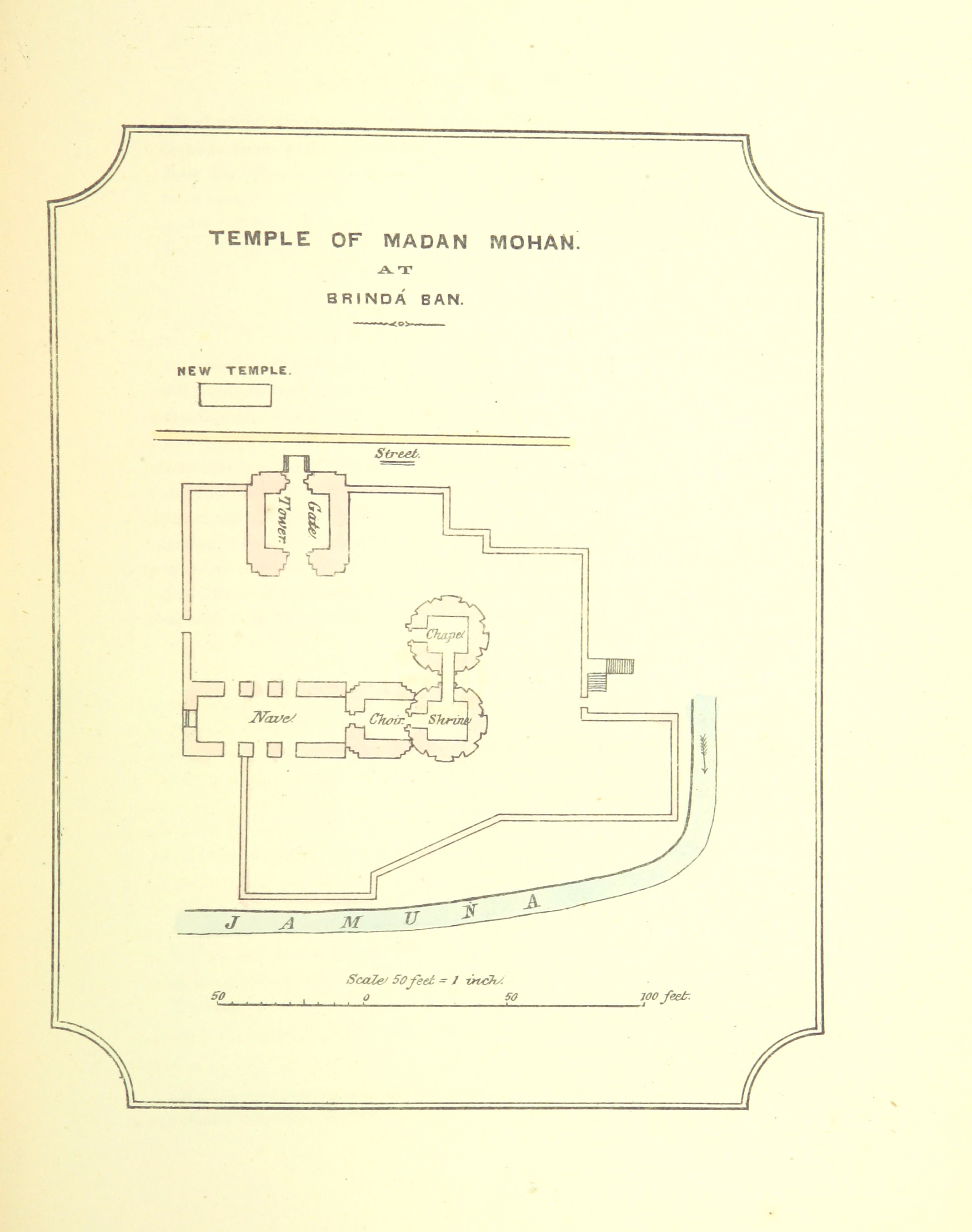
Floor plan of the temple complex.

== Nearby attractions ==
- Kaliya Ghat
- Bankey Bihari Temple
- Radha Ramana Temple
- Nidhivan
- Seva Kunj
- Sanatana Goswami Samadhi
- Ashta Sakhi Temple.

== See also ==
- Hinduism in India
- List of Hindu temples in India
- List of Monuments of National Importance in Agra circle
- Madan Mohan
- Radha Krishna
- Sanatana Goswami
- Radha Krishna Vivah Sthali, Bhandirvan
