= Govardhan (disambiguation) =

Govardhan is a town in Uttar Pradesh, India.

Govardhan may also refer to:

- Govardhan Hill, a scared hill in Uttar Pradesh, India
- Govardhan Math, a Hindu religious site in Puri, Odisha, India
- Govardhan Puja, a Hindu festival related to the deity Krishna

Surname

- Gampa Govardhan, Indian politician, member of the Telangana Legislature

Given name

- Govardhan of Gour, 13th-century Indian monarch
- Govardhan (artist), 17th-century Indian painter in the Mughal court
- Govardhan Asrani (born 1941), Indian actor and filmmaker popularly known as Asrani
- Govardhan Mangilal Sharma, Indian politician, member of the Maharashtra Legislative Assembly
- Govardhan Upadhyay, Indian politician, member of the Indian National Congress

== See also ==
- Govardhana (disambiguation)
- Harshabardhan and Gobardhan, fictional Indian characters created by Shibram Chakraborty
