= Govardhana Shila =

Sacred rock of Govardhan Hill

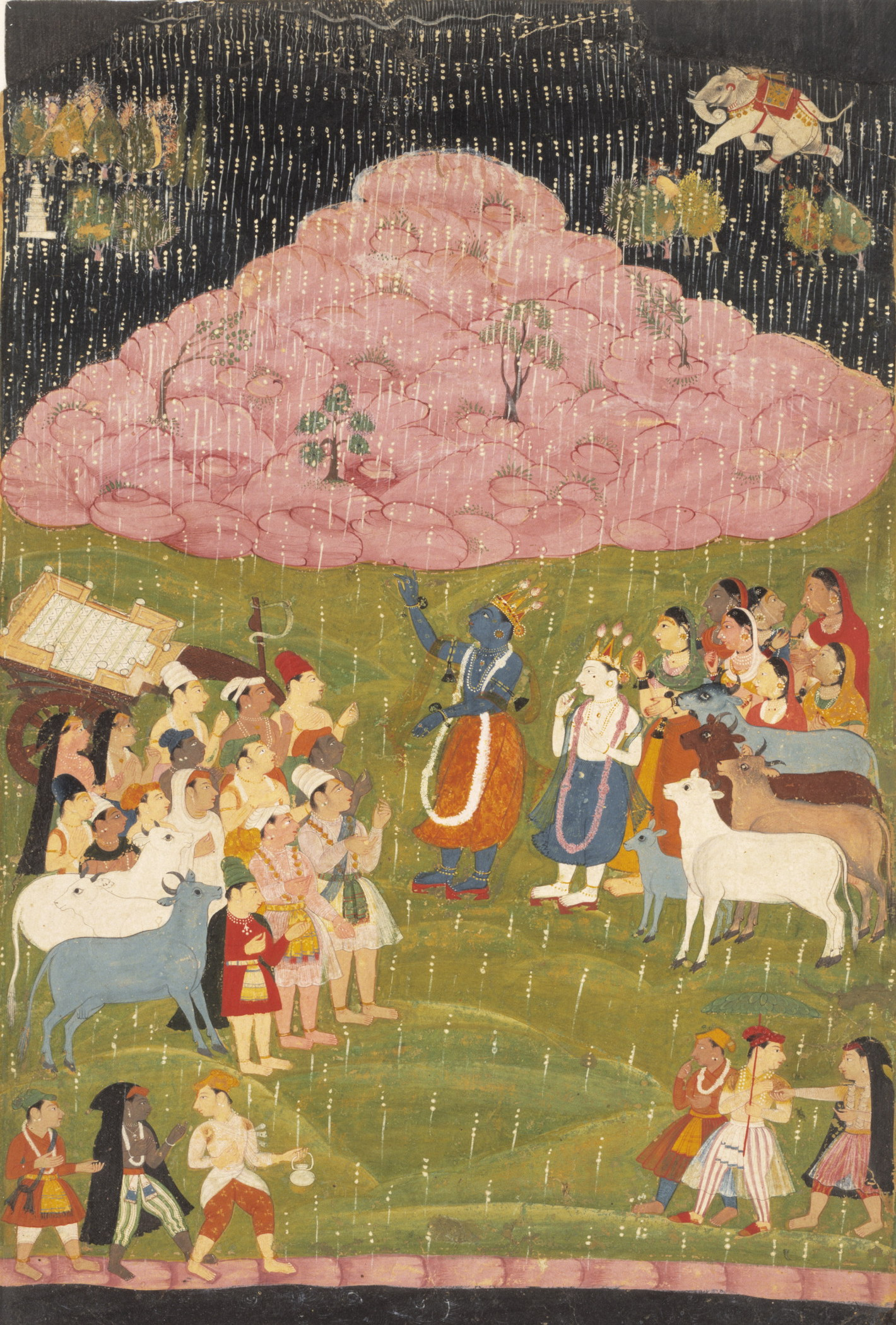
An Image of Krishna raising Mount Govardhan from manuscript, ca 1640, of the Bhagavata Purana

The Govardhana Shila is a rock from the Govardhana Hill in Braj, Uttar Pradesh, India. Govardhan Hill holds a unique position in Hindu scriptures related to Krishna, the land called Braj where He was born. Known as Govardhan or Giriraj and being the sacred centre of Braj, it is identified as a natural form of Krishna. Indian art overwhelmingly prefers the iconic image, but some aniconism does occur in folk worship, early Buddhism, Shiva's Banalinga, and Vishnu's Shaligrama). They have solar significance, and their use in worship predates the Hindu period in India. The stone is usually brown in colour.

Govardhan, a very famous place of Hindu pilgrimage, is located 26 km west of Mathura (154 km from New Delhi) on the state highway to Deeg. Govardhan is located on a narrow sandstone hill known as Giriraj which is about 8 km in length. When Vallabhacharya did parikrama (circumambulation) of Govardhana Hill while visiting Vrindavana in 1515 AD, he did not walk on the hill because he considered Govardhana as non-different from Lord Krishna. Therefore, traditionally Vaishnavas do not step on Govardhan Hill.

== Legend ==
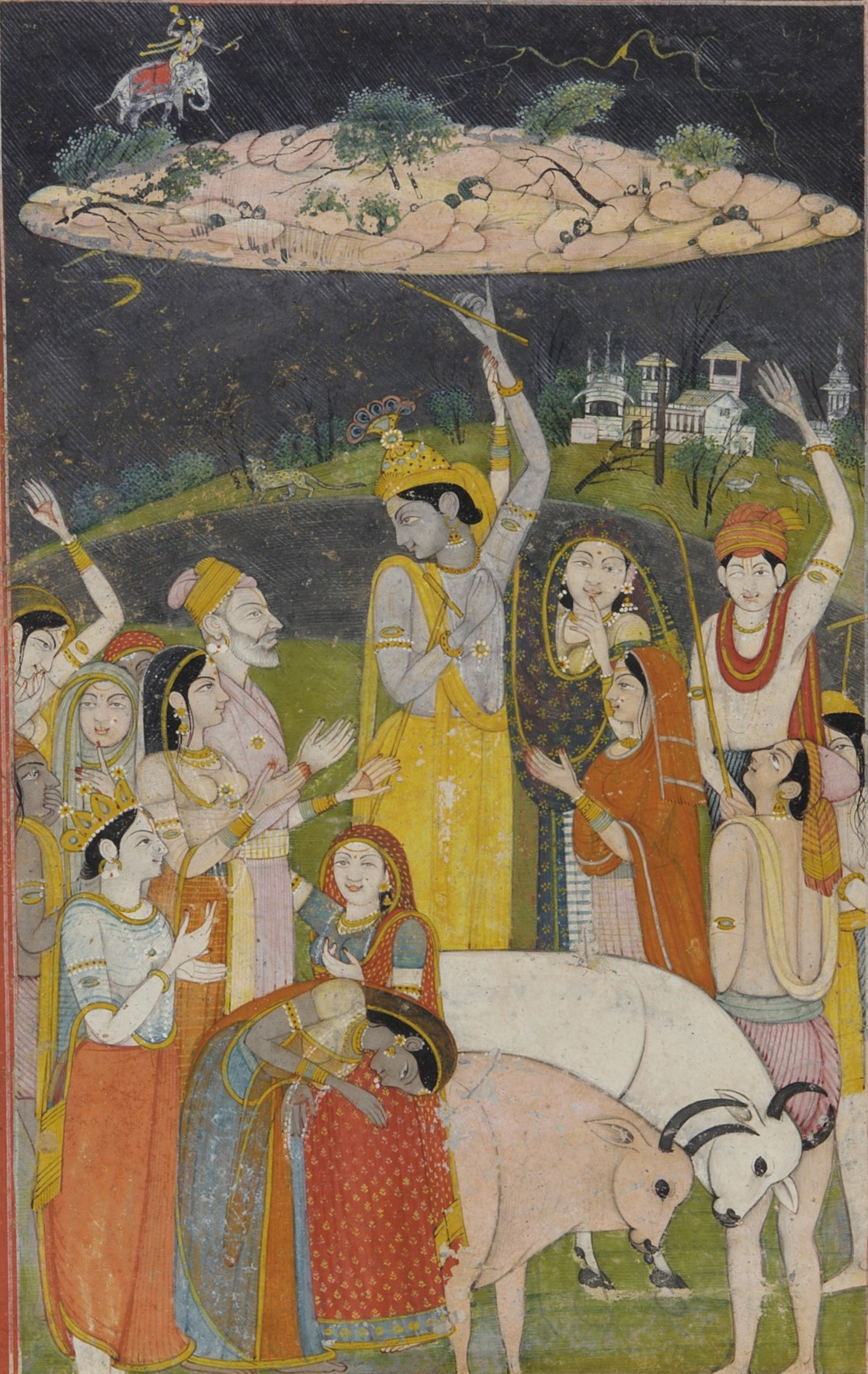
Krishna holding Govardhan hill From the Smithsonian Institution collections.

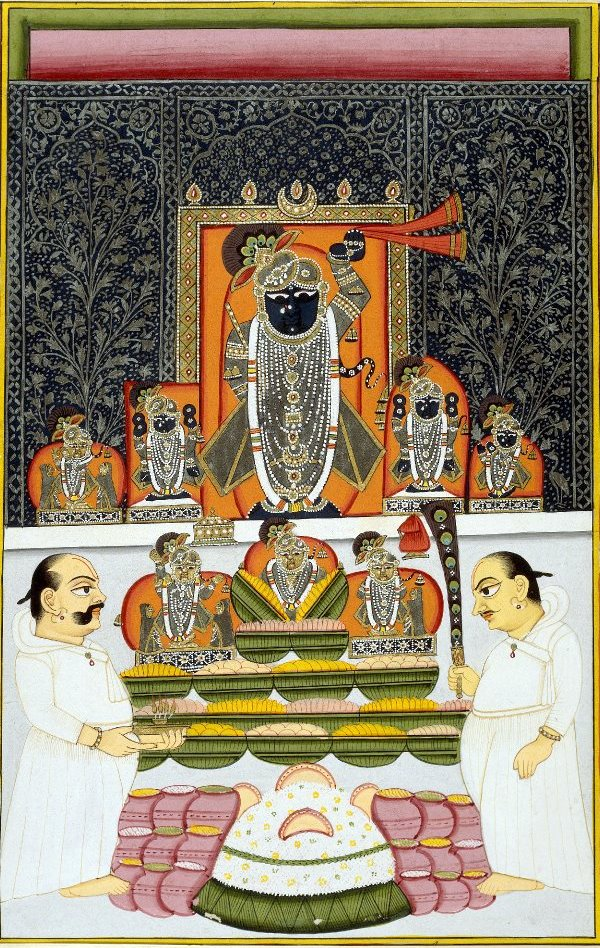
Nathdwara Srinathji in the Govardhan leela pose, at the autumn Annakuta festival, late 18th century

The people of Vrindavan traditionally worshipped Indra as the provider of rain. Krishna, however, suggested that they honor the Govardhana hill instead since it supplied grass for cattle to graze. This change angered Indra and he sent an intense rainstorm. The villagers feared Indra's wrath. As narrated in the Shrimad Bhagavat, Lord Krishna picked up the Govardhana hill and held it above his head with his pinky finger for seven days to protect his kinsfolk from the wrath of rain god Indra. This incident gave Krishna the epithet Govardhandhari. Since Lord Krishna declared that He and Govardhana hill was non-different, the followers of the Vallabhacharya tradition, devotees of Lord Krishna, worship the Govardhana hill. They worship the Govardhana hill along with the Saligrama, both considered as aniconic symbols of the Supreme Personality of Godhead, exactly as they worship the Deity of Krishna in the temple. English translation of the relevant texts on Govardahan Hill from Srimad Bhagvatam state:

Krishna assumed a great transcendental form and declared to the inhabitants of Vrindavana that He was Himself Govardhana Hill in order to convince the devotees that Govardhana Hill and Krishna are identical. The identity of Krishna and Govardhana Hill is still honoured, and great devotees take rocks from Govardhan Hill, and worship them exactly as they worship the Deity of Krishna in the temple. (Srimad Bhagavatam 10.24.35 purport)

Of all the devotees, this Govardhana Hill is the best! O my friends, this hill supplies Krishna and Balarama, along with Their calves, cows and cowherd friends, will all kinds of necessities—water for drinking, very soft grass, caves, fruits, flowers and vegetables. In this way the hill offers respects to the Lord. Being touched by the lotus feet of Krishna and Balarama, Govardhana Hill appears very jubilant. (Srimad Bhagavatam 10.21.18)

== Govardahan puja and hill parikrama ==
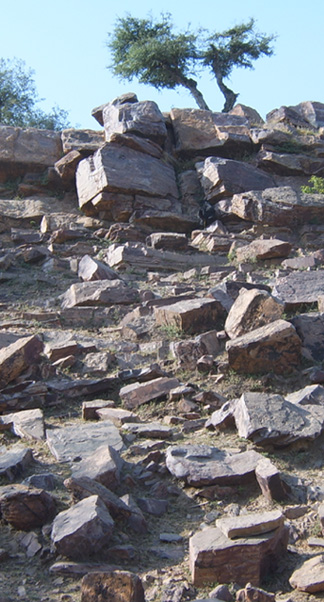
Close-up of Govardhan hill with Shilas, Vrindavan

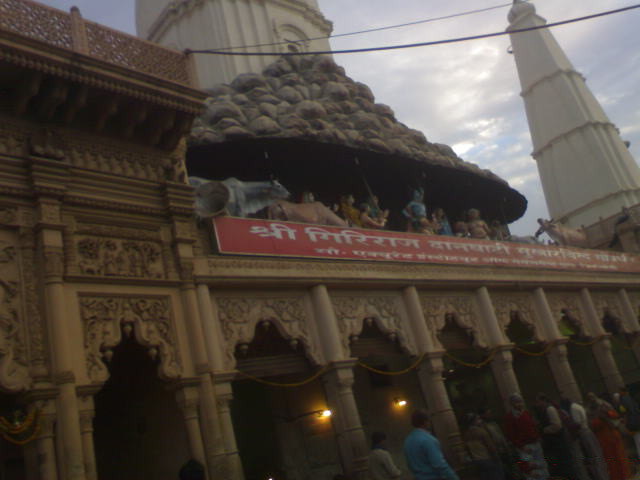
Govardhan Temple starting point of Govardhan Parikrama

Presently at its highest point, the Govardhan hill is just 25 m (80 feet) high and is a wide hill. It is a narrow sandstone hill known as Giriraj which is about 8 km in length.

After Krishna protected the inhabitants of Vraj (Vridavan) from the wrath of Indra, he counseled them to worship Govardhan Hill and they did by way of a puja and a parikrama (circumambulation) around the hill. Thus, a festival in commemoration of the lifting of Mount Govardhan, near Mathura, by Krishna came into vogue as Govardhan Puja when Mount Govardhan is worshipped the day after Deepawali (festival of lights) is celebrated. Pious people keep awake the whole night and cook fifty-six (or 108) different types of food for the bhog (the offering of food) to Krishna. This ceremony is called ankut or annakuta which means a mountain of food. Various types of food – cereals, pulses, fruit, vegetables, chutneys, pickles and salads – are offered to the Deity and then distributed as prasada to devotees. Thousands of devotees bring offerings for Giriraj. Followed by this pooja, the devotees perform the Govardhana parikrama.

A Parikrama [circumambulation- going 38 km {24-miles} around the hill] is a sacred ritual called Govardana parikrama performed by many believers. There is no time limit for performing Govardhana parikrama, but for those who perform the dandavata (full prostration) Parikrama, an arduous form which may take weeks and sometimes even months to complete. It is performed by standing in one spot, offering obeisances like a stick (danda) by lying flat on the ground and then continuing, contiguously, till the entire route is covered. It is also said that some sadhus (Hindu holy men) perform 108 dandavata Parikrama by offering 108 obeisances in one spot before moving to the next. This can take a number of months to complete.

This ritual of circumambulation is considered to be even better if it is done with milk. A clay pot filled with milk, with a hole at the bottom, is carried by the devotees in one hand and a pot filled with dhoop (incense smoke) in another. An escort continuously fills up the pot with milk till the circumambulation is completed. Circumambulation is also done with candy being handed out to children, en route.

Parikrama of Govardhana starts at the Manasi-Ganga Kund (lake) and then after having darsan of Lord Harideva, from Radha-kunda village, where the Vrindavan road meets the parikrama path. After parikrama of 38 km, covering important tanks, shilas and shrines such as Radha Kunda, Syama Kunda, Dan Ghati, Mukharavinda, Rinamochana Kunda, Kusuma Sarovara and Punchari, it ends at Mansi Ganga Kund only.

== Sites ==
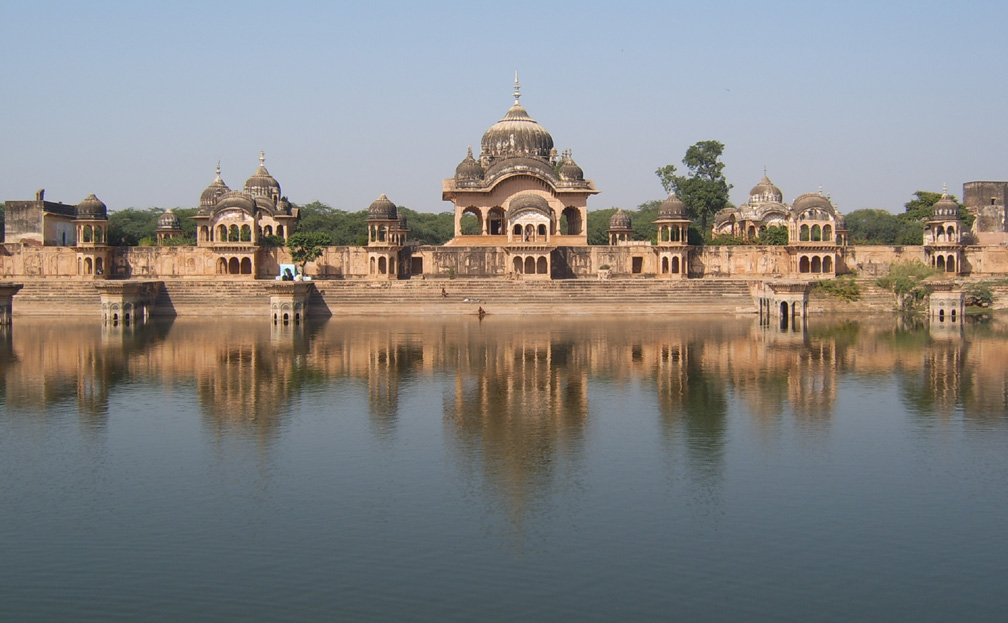
Kusum Sarovar ("Lake of Flowers"), one of the holy sites on Govardhan Hill

A few of the sites include:

- The sandstone monument and lake of Kusum Sarovar.
- Giriraj Temple
- Shri Chaitanya Temple, built of red sandstone and adorned with paintings of Krishna and Radha
- Radha Kund Temple
- Mansi Ganga Lake
- Danghati Temple

== Shape of Govardhana hill ==
In Govinda-lilamrita, Krishnadasa Kaviraja Gosvami states that Govardhana Hill is shaped like a peacock and that Radha Kunda and Syama Kunda are its eyes. Dan Ghati and Manasi Ganga are its long neck. Mukharavinda is the mouth, Kusuma Sarovara its face, and Punchari is its back and tail feathers. A peacock often curves its neck and puts his head under its stomach. Govardhana Hill is thus shaped in this pose of a peacock.

== Mala (garland) of Gunja seeds and Krishna ==
Followers of Vallabhacharya worship Krishna in a small stone form (Govardhana Shila) representing Mount Govardhan, with a gunja mala (garland) around it representing Radharani. It is said that the child Krishna was inseparable from his favourite gunja maala which was said to represent Radha. This mythology has made the Gunjā (Abrus precatorius) seeds - the bright red seed of a fig tree - also a favourite for native jewellery.

The only other God who shows a twig with a gunja seed on his upturned right hand palm to indicate the divya ksehtra’s superiority over Kashi (Varanasi) is Lord Narasimha, in the Gunja Narasimha Swamy temple locaterd at T.Narsipur in Mysore district in Karnataka on the bank of the Kaveri - Kapila - Spatika Sarovar sangam (confluence).

== Recent development ==
In 2018, the Uttar Pradesh Chief Minister Yogi Adityanath declared Govardhan as a pilgrimage centre (teerth sthal) along with Mathura, Baldev, Nandgaon, Radhakund and Gokul.

== See also ==
- Lord Krishna related
  - Govardhan Hill
  - Vrindavan
  - Govardhan Puja
  - Krishna Janmasthan Temple Complex
  - Kundinapuri, Rukmini's birthplace
  - Kaundinyapur, near Nagpur and associated with Rukmini's birthplace Kundinapuri
  - Rawal, Uttar Pradesh, Radha's birthplace
- Lord Rama related
  - Ram Janmabhoomi, Rama's birthplace
  - Janakpur Dham, Sita's birthplace in Nepal
  - Punaura Dham, Sita's birthplace in India
- Parikrama
- Yatra
