= Govardhana =

Govardhana might refer to:

- Govardhana (poet) or Govardhanacharya, a 12th-century poet of Eastern India
- Govardhan, a town in Uttar Pradesh, India
- Govardhan Hill, a pilgrimage site in Uttar Pradesh, India

== See also ==
- Govardhan (disambiguation)
