= Daan-Ghati =

Coordinates: 27.4953°N 77.4626°E

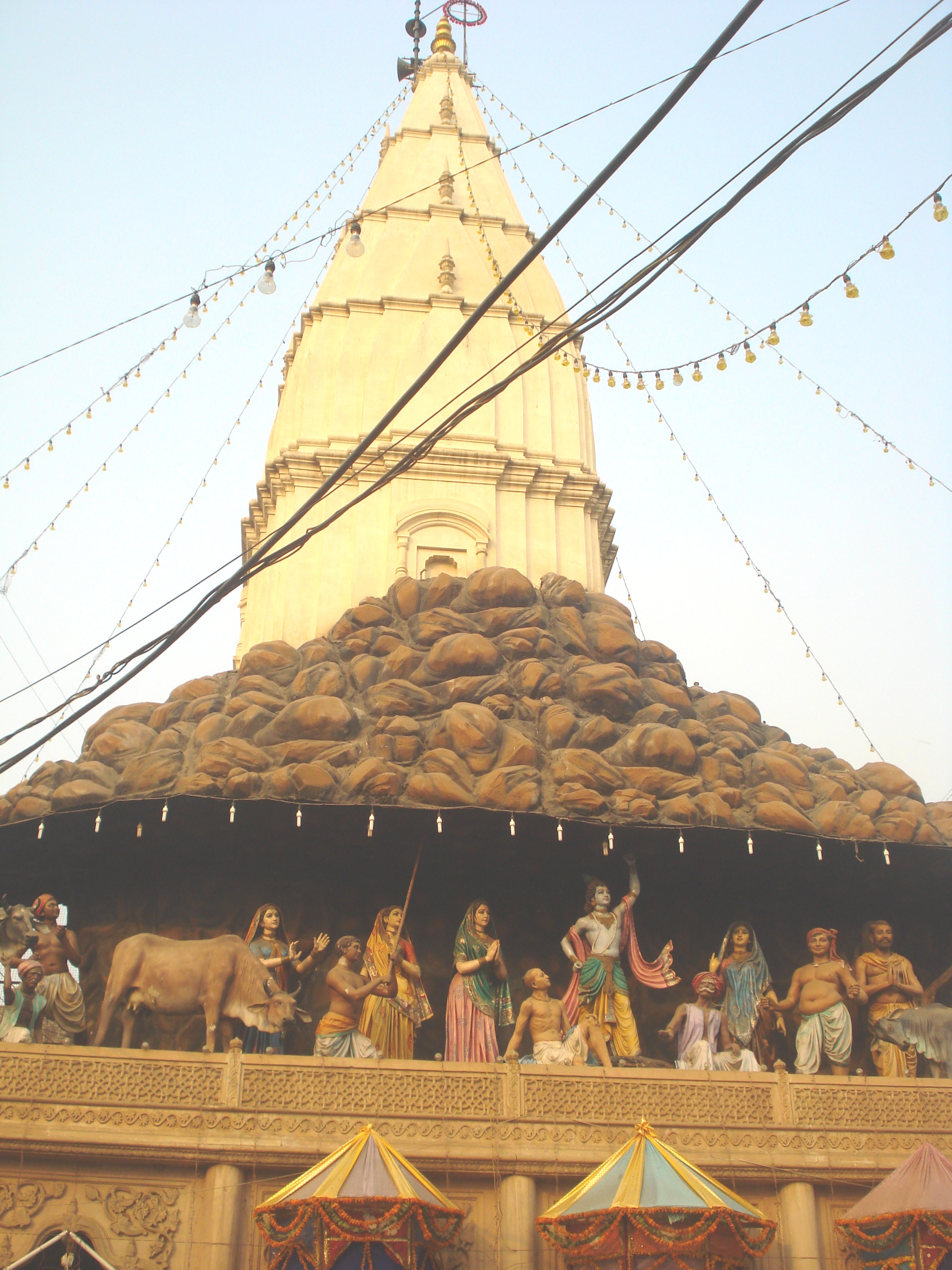
The scene of Krishna lifting Govardhan at the temple

Daan-Ghati is one of the two main temple structures in Govardhan, near Mathura, India. The other temple structure is called Dasvisa.

It is involved in the Govardhan Puja, a 21 kilometre circumambulation of the hill that it is believed Krishna lifted with his little finger to protect his worshipers from the wrath of Indra, the Vedic god of rain.

Over time, this temple has slowly taken over the place of main temple of the town. Also, there has been much commercialization of the temple structure. With ever-growing touristic importance of the place, the commercial interests are growing and at times conflicts with religious worship.

The temple reform was started by a Daan-Ghati management committee, established in the 1970s by Shri Gopal Prasad Kaushik, one of the prominent citizens of the town. In 2019, the temple committee approached the State Human Rights Commission alleging that the temple's assistant manager had embezzled over 100 million rupees from temple funds.
