= Govardhan =

- Town
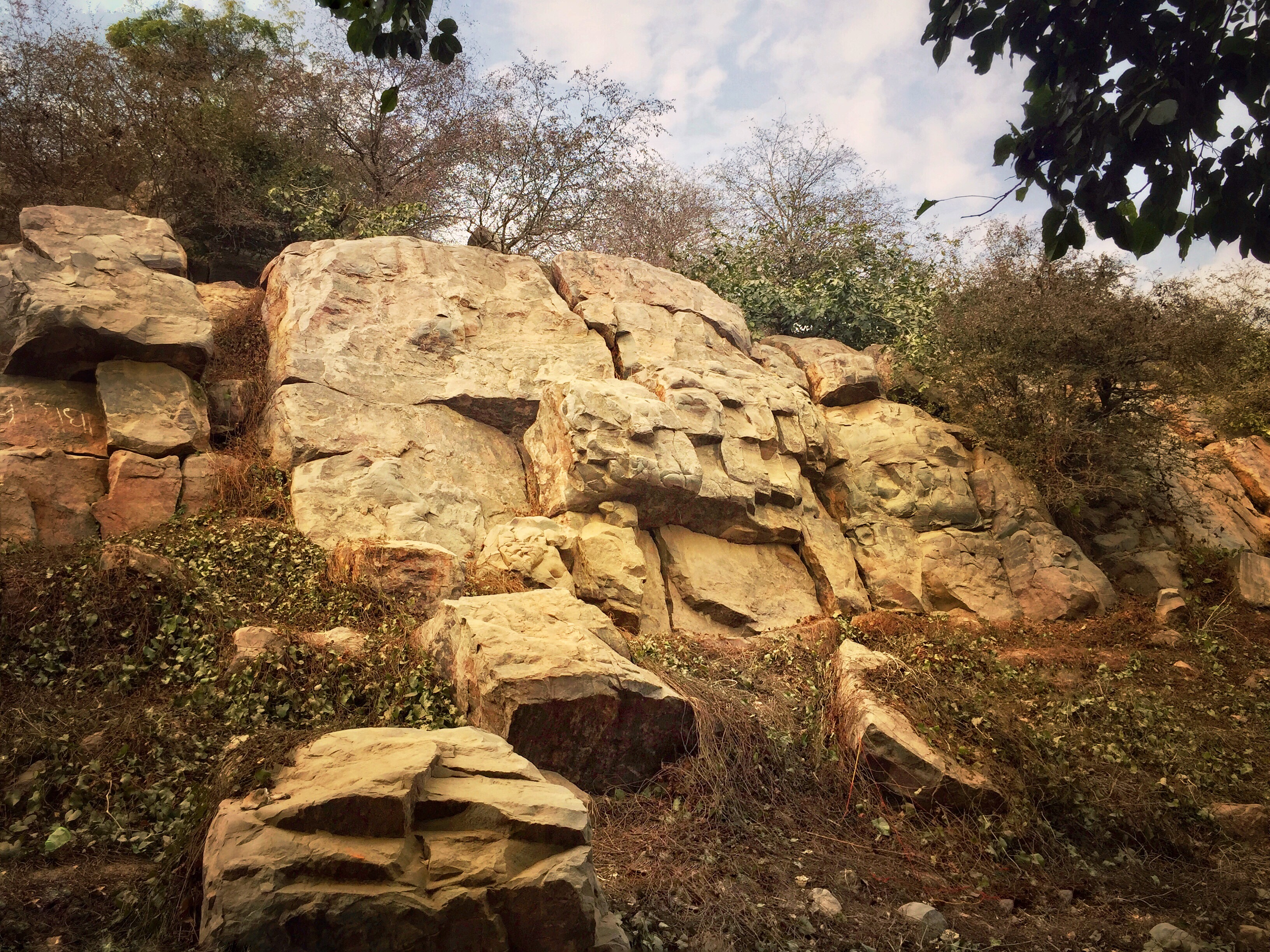
- Govardhan hill

- Location in Uttar Pradesh, India
- Coordinates: 27.5°N 77.47°E
- Country: India
- State: Uttar Pradesh
- District: Mathura
- Elevation: 179 m (587 ft)

Population (2011)
  - Total: 22,576

Languages
  - Official: Hindi
  - Native: Braj Bhasha dialect
- Time zone: UTC+5:30 (IST)
- PIN: 281502
- Vehicle registration: UP-85

Govardhan also called Giriraj, is a key pilgrimage centre in India and a municipal town; a nagar panchayat; seat of an MLA (Member of Legislative Assembly) of Uttar Pradesh; a Tehsil, in Mathura district in India in the state of Uttar Pradesh. About 23 kilometres from Mathura, the town is on the road link between Mathura and Deeg.

== Geography ==
Govardhana is located at 27.5°N 77.47°E. It has an average elevation of 179 metres (587 feet). Govardhana has been made Tehsil in Mathura District by the Uttar Pradesh government.

== Demographics ==
In the 2011 Indian Census, Govardhana had a population of 22,576. Males constituted 55% of the population and females 45%. Govardhana has an average literacy rate of 62%, higher than the national average of 59.5%: male literacy is 70%, and female literacy is 52%. In Govardhana, 17% of the population is under 6 years of age.

== Govardhan Hill ==
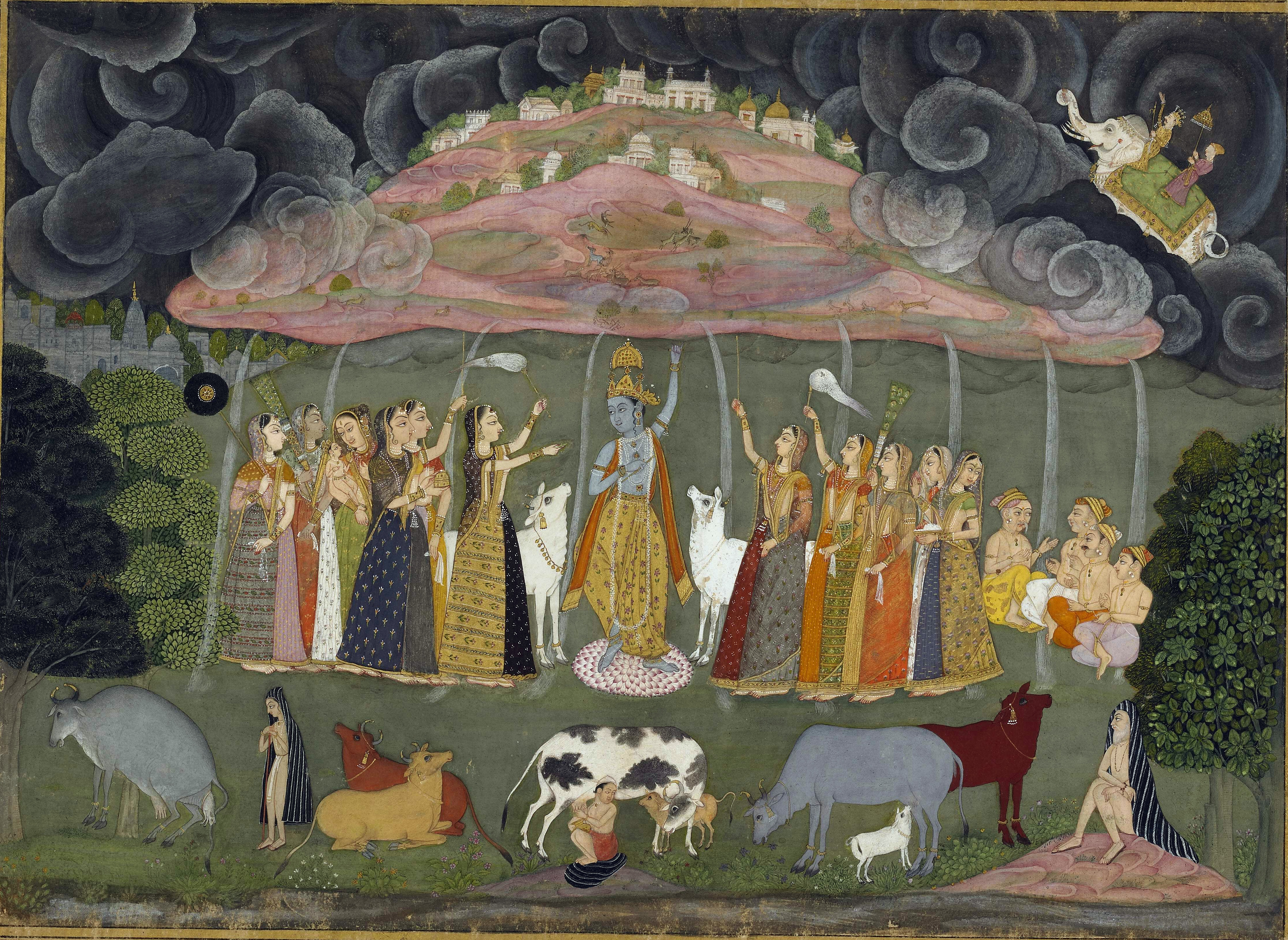
Krishna lifting the Govardhan Hill

=== Pilgrimage ===
Each year Hindus and other people make pilgrimage to Govardhan, and its sacred Govardhan Hill, from different places in India and other parts of the world. They circumambulate Govardhan and offer their obeisances to Krishna and Radha, key deities in Hinduism. One of the main festivals celebrated at Govardhan is Govardhan Puja, that commemorates the lifting of Govardhan Hill (Giriraj Parvat) to protect the villagers of Braj from the flood caused by the Lord of thunder and rain, Indra. One of the most important day celebrated at Govardhan is Guru Poornima (also called "Mudia Poono"). Following the festival of lights, or Diwali, the previous day, devotees come to Govardhan for parikrama. Chaitanya Mahaprabhu visited this temple as per Chaitnya charitamratam.

=== Historic religious sites ===
Sites on the hill include Kusum Sarovar, Haridev Temple, and other temples like Daan-Ghati Temple and Mukharbind Temple. The town is also famous for its 21 kilometers long Parikrama of the famous Govardhan Hill.

Shri Govardhan Giriraj Ji Temple, dedicated to Lord Krishna.

Shri Govardhan Giriraj Ji Temple, Govardhan Hill, Mathura

=== Mansi Ganga sacred lake ===
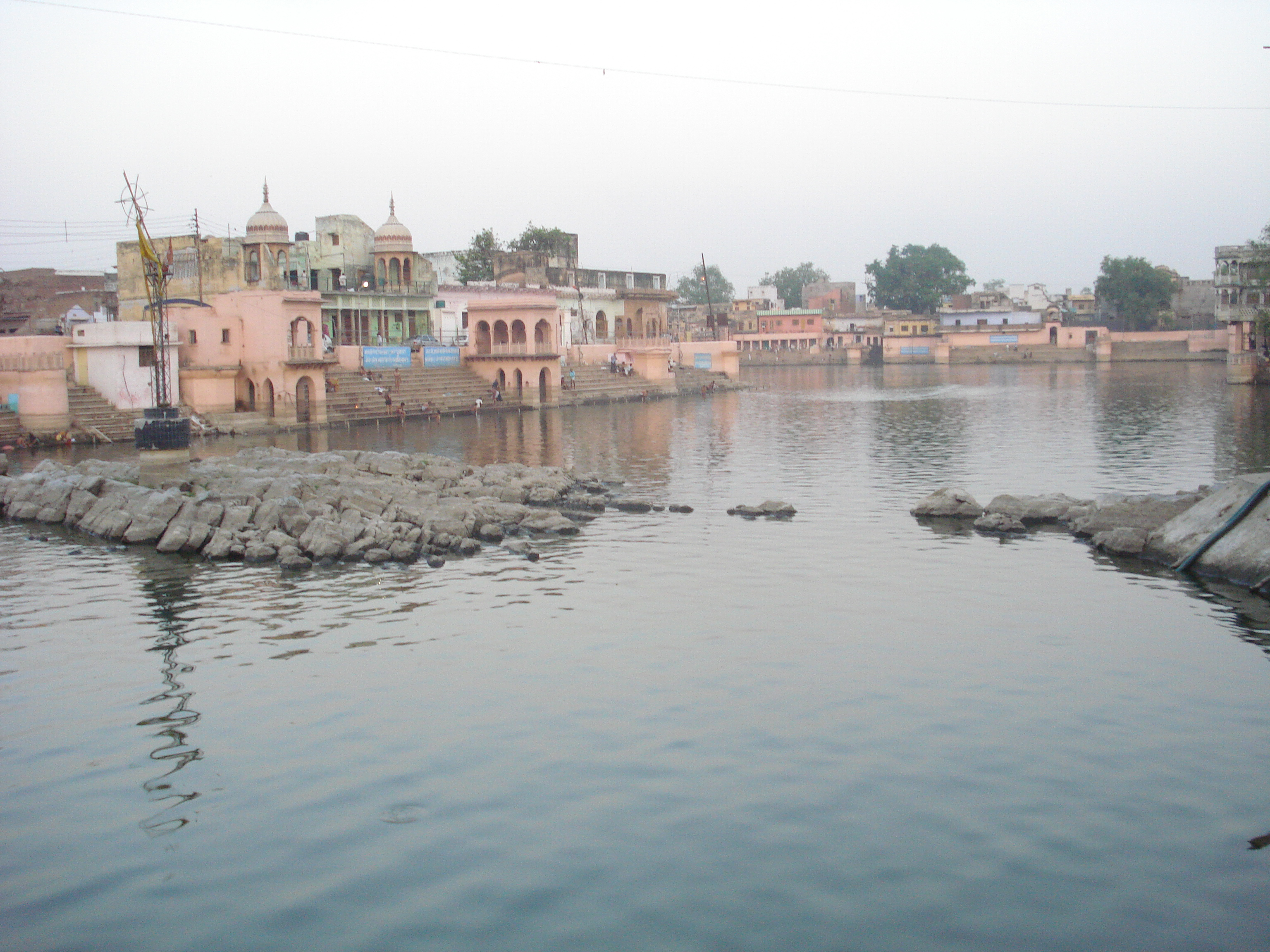
Mansi Ganga

The town also houses Mansi Ganga, a close-ended lake. On the banks of this sacred lake, there are quite a few temples, prominent among them the Mukharbind temple.

=== Kusum sarovar and Samadhi of Suraj Mal ===
On the Govardhan Parikrama path on the western bank of 130 sqm sacred artificial lake Kusum Sarovar (Kusum kund) there are three Chhatris housing the samadhis of Suraj Mal (r. 1755 – 25 December 1763) and 2 his wives, all of these memorials were built by his son and successor Jawahar Singh.

The architecture and carving is in the pierced stone style and the ceiling of cenotaphs are adorned with the beautiful painting of life of lord Krishna. Most imposing chattris are of Suraj Mal, flanked on either side by two smaller chattris of his two wives, "Maharani Hansiya" and "Maharani Kishori".

== Transportation ==
Govardhan is located about 150 kilometres (93 miles) from Delhi, where the airport is located. A railway station is located at Mathura, where taxis can be hired to reach the town, which is about 23 kilometres (14 mi) away. There are also tourist buses and a single line electric train for the journey from Mathura.

== Gallery ==
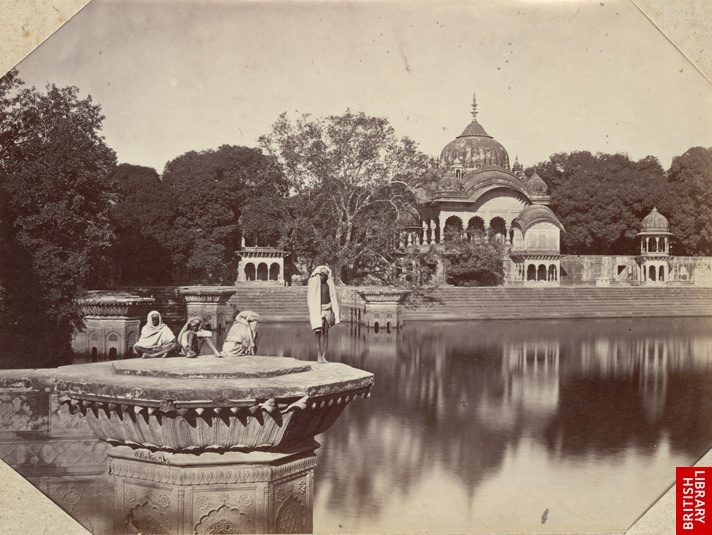
Suraj Mal's Cenotaph at Govardhan, a photo by William Henry Baker, c.1860.

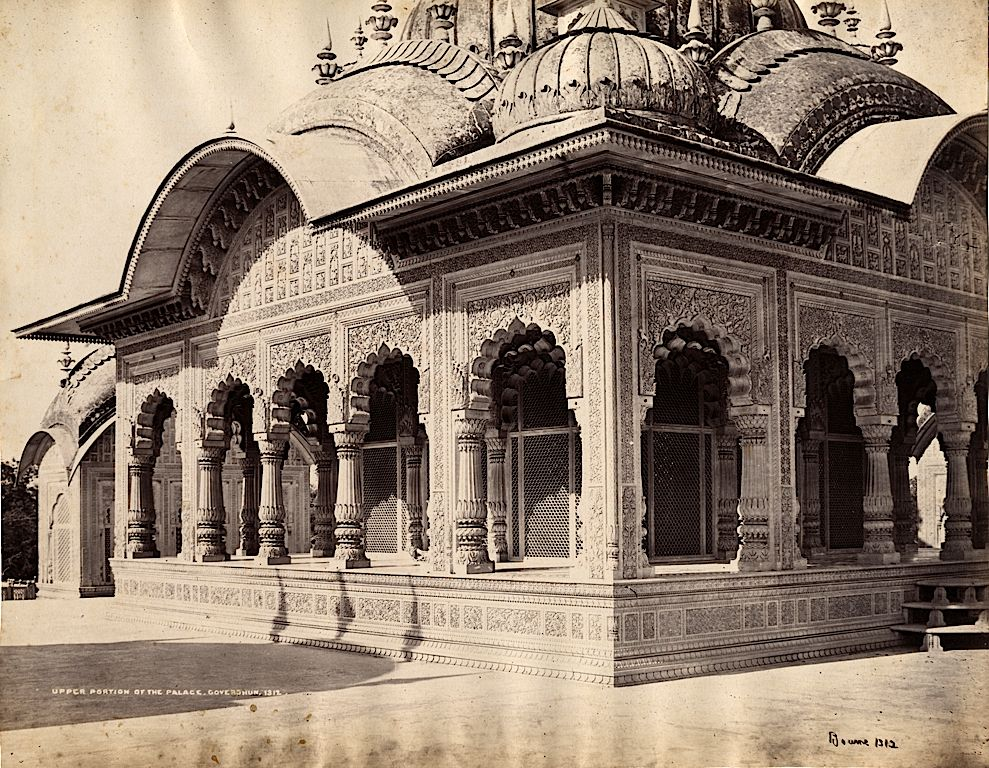
Samuel Bourne, "Upper Portion of the Palace, Goverdhun, 1312," 1863-1869, photograph mounted on cardboard sheet, Department of Image Collections, National Gallery of Art Library, Washington, D C

== See also ==
- Govardhana sila
- Krishna Janmasthan Temple Complex
- Ram Janmabhoomi, Rama's birthplace
- Janakpur Dham, Sita's birthplace in Nepal
- Punaura Dham, Sita's birthplace in India
- Kundinapuri, Rukmini's birthplace
- Kaundinyapur, near Nagpur and associated with Rukmini's birthplace Kundinapuri
- Rawal, Uttar Pradesh, Radha's birthplace
- Parikrama
- Yatra
