= Radha Kund =

Pilgrimage site dedicated to Goddess Radha

Radha Kund Rādhākuṇḍa
- town
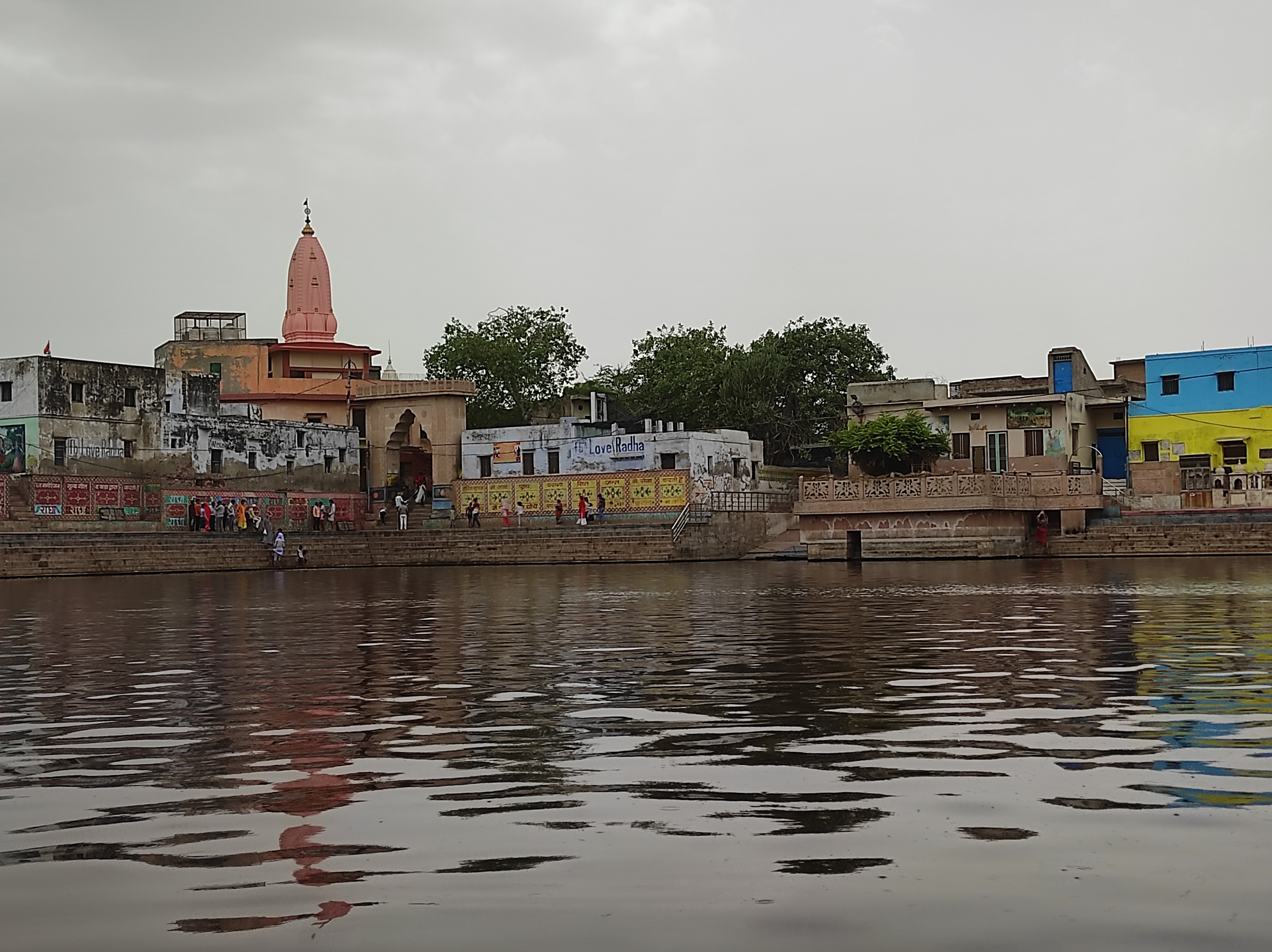
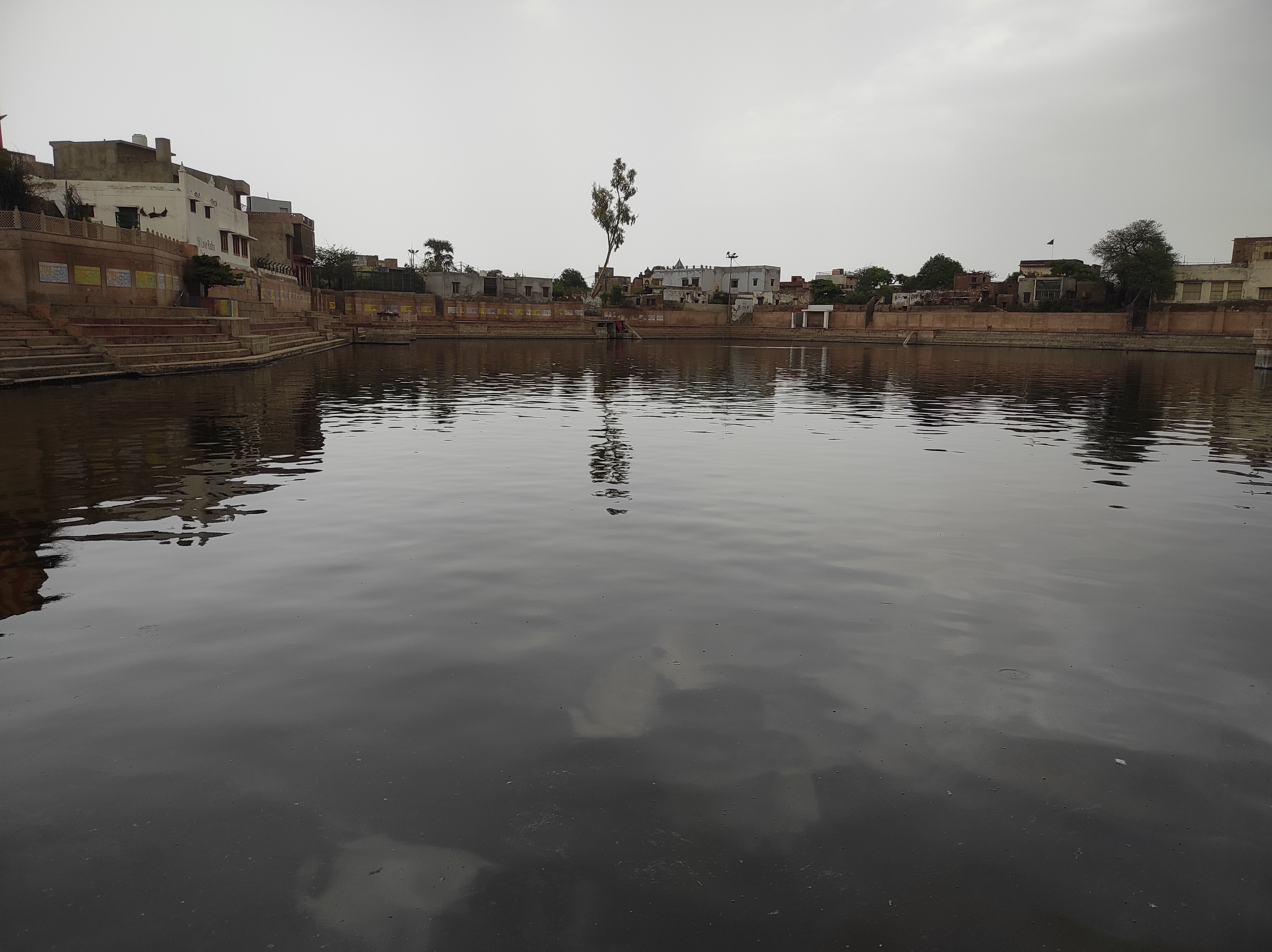
- Top to bottom: Radha Kund and Shyam Kund

- Location in Uttar Pradesh, India Radha Kund (India)
- Coordinates: 27.525278°N 77.491389°E
- Country: India
- State: Uttar Pradesh
- District: Mathura

Population (2001)
  - Total: 5,884

Languages
  - Official: Hindi
- Time zone: UTC+5:30 (IST)
- Postal code: 281504
- Vehicle registration: UP85
- Website: http://mathura.nic.in/

Radha Kund (IAST: Rādhākuṇḍa, lit. 'Radha’s Pond') is a town and nagar panchayat in Mathura district in the Indian state of Uttar Pradesh. It is also one of the pilgrimage sites dedicated to Hindu goddess Radha.

== Legend ==
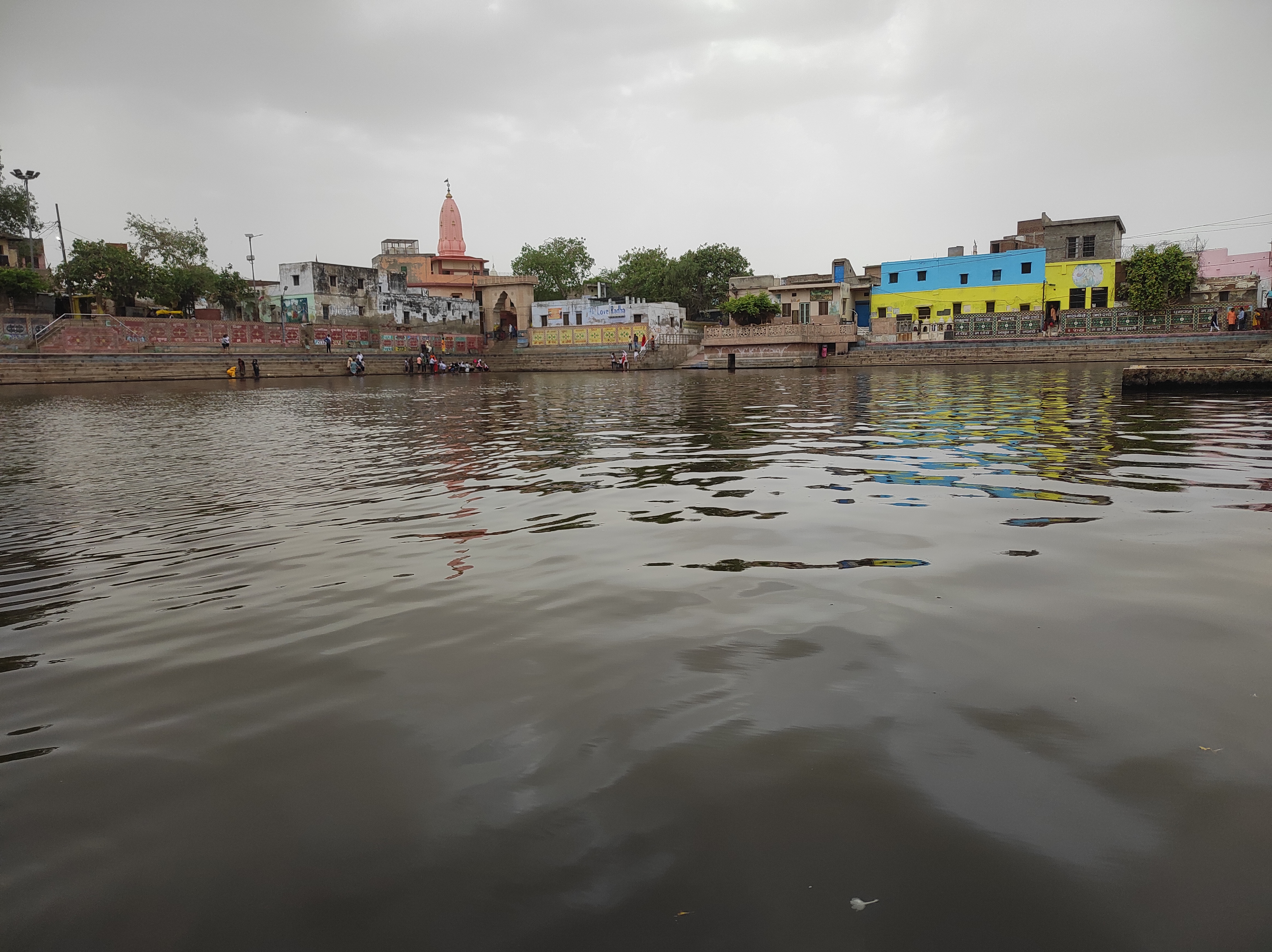
Stepwell of Radha Kund.

Following the Upadesamrta (Nectar of Instruction) by early 16th-century saint Rupa Goswami of Vrindavan, a close associate of Chaitanya Mahaprabhu, many Vaishnavas consider Radha Kund to be the supreme of all holy places.

According to popular legend, when Lord Krishna slew a mighty asura (demon) in the form of a bull, his consort Radha asked Krishna to wash off his sins by taking dips in various holy rivers. Krishna laughed it off and struck the ground with his foot whereupon all the river goddesses emerged in front of them and filled the ground with their water. Krishna bathed in this kund (temple tank) to please Radha. Later, this water reservoir is called Shyam kund. Opposite to Shyam Kunda, Radha and her friends also dug out the ground, which was filled with the holy water of Shyam kund by Krishna. This water reservoir is named after Radha and is called Radha kund. Krishna then took bath in the Radha kunda and announced that to whoever takes bath in Radha kund will be blessed with the intense love (Prem-Bhakti) which Radharani has for him. Similarly, Radharani also took bath in the Shyam kund and announced that whoever takes bath in Shyam kund would be blessed with the love that Krishna has for her. To this day, millions of pilgrims desiring love for Radha-Krishna come to this holy spot to take bath in a reverential mood, bathing first in Radha-Kund, then in Shyam-kund, and then again in Radha-kund. This is the only place of pilgrimage where an auspicious bath is taken at midnight.

== Demographics ==
As of 2001 India census, Radha-Kund had a population of 5889. Males constitute 54% of the population and females 46%. Radha-Kund has an average literacy rate of 65%, higher than the national average of 59.5%: male literacy is 76%, and female literacy is 53%. In Radha-Kund, 16% of the population is under 6 years of age.

== See also ==
- Kusum Sarovar
- Govardhan Hill
- Braj region
- Radha Krishna
- Vrindavan
