= Govardhan Hill =

Sacred Hindu site in Uttar Pradesh, India

Coordinates: 27°30′37.93″N 77°28′33.98″E

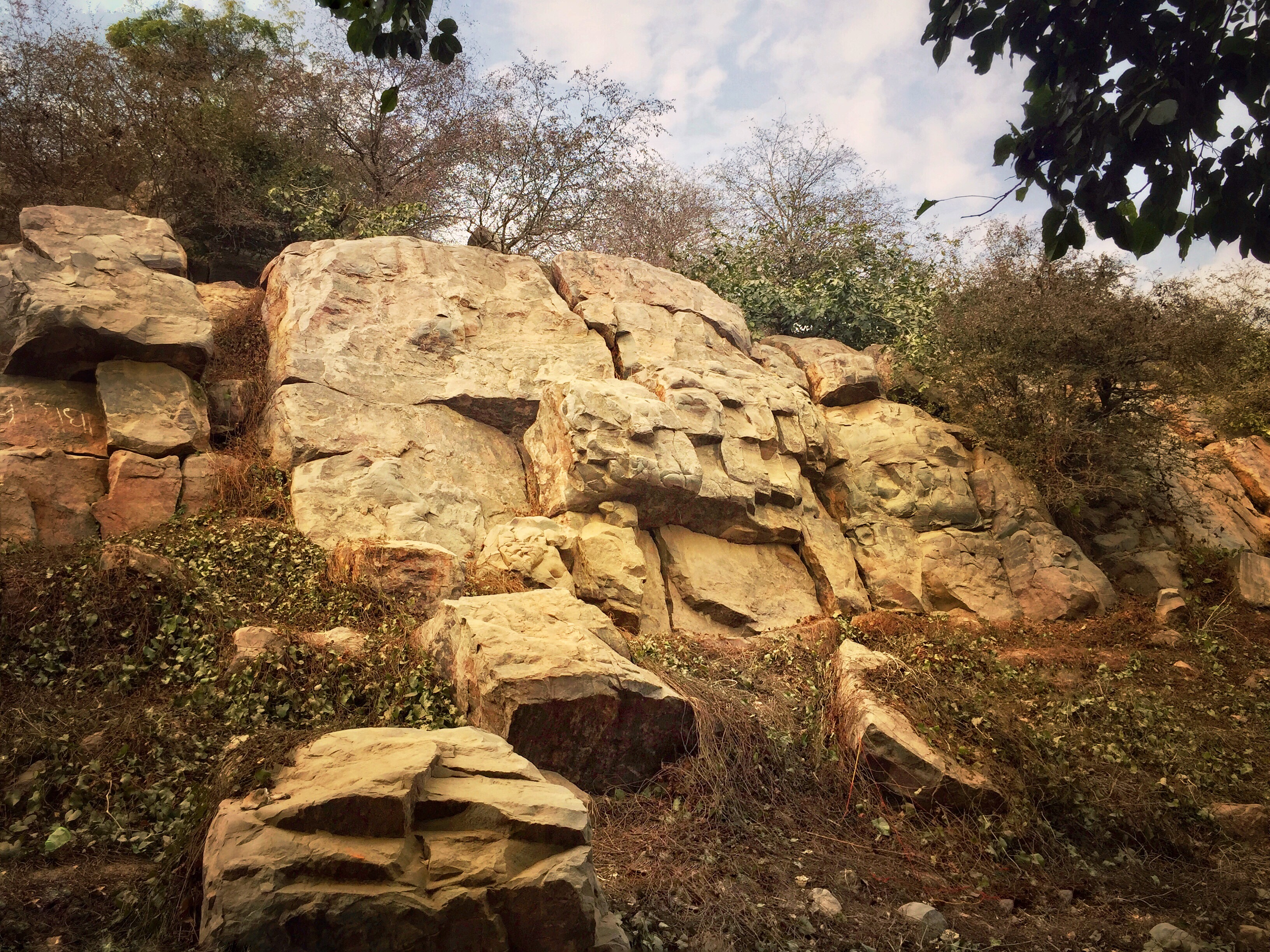
Govardhana hill

Govardhana Hill (Sanskrit: गोवर्धन; pronounced [ɡoːʋɐrdʰɐnɐ]), also called Mount Govardhana and Giriraj, is a sacred Hindu site in the Mathura district of Uttar Pradesh, India on an 8 km long hill located in the area of Govardhan and Radha Kund, which is about 21 kilometres (13 miles) from Vrindavan. It is the sacred centre of Braj and is identified as a natural form of Krishna, the Govardhana Shila.

== Geography ==
Govardhan Hill, stretching from Radha Kund to south of Govardhan, is a long ridge that, at its highest, stands 100 feet (30 m) above the surrounding land. At the southern end of the hill is the village of Punchari, while at the crest stand the villages of Aanyor and Jatipura. The parikarma path of Govardhan hill is intersected by some part of district Deeg of State of Rajasthan.

== Background ==
Govardhan Hill is considered a sacred site because it is the setting for many legends relating to the life of Krishna, who is traditionally believed to be embodied in the hill. Krishna and his brother Balarama are said to have roamed among its shaded groves, pools, caves, and lush cow-pastures. The area's waterfalls, garden-grove (van), arbour (nikunj), water tank (kund), and flora are depicted in scenes of Krishna's adventures with Radha.

== Temples ==
The buildings and other structures on the Hill date from the sixteenth century. As of 2013, there is no known archaeological evidence of any remains of greater age.

A few of the sites include:

- The sandstone monument and lake of Kusum Sarovar.
- Giriraj Temple
- Shri Chaitanya Temple, built of red sandstone and adorned with paintings of Krishna and Radha
- Radha Kund Temple
- Mansi Ganga Lake
- Danghati Temple
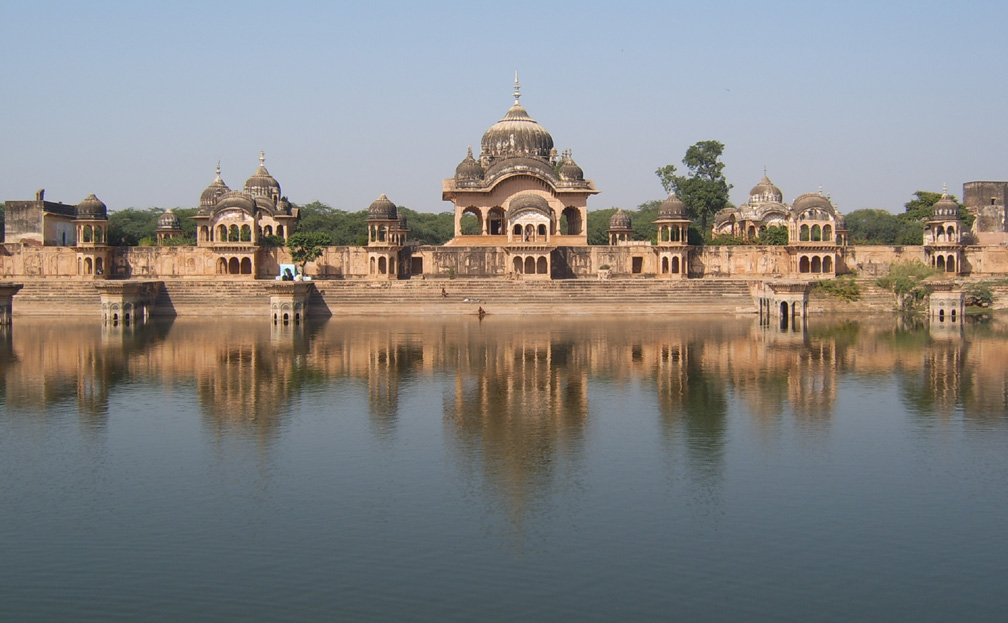
Kusum Sarovar ("Lake of Flowers"), one of the holy sites on Govardhan Hill

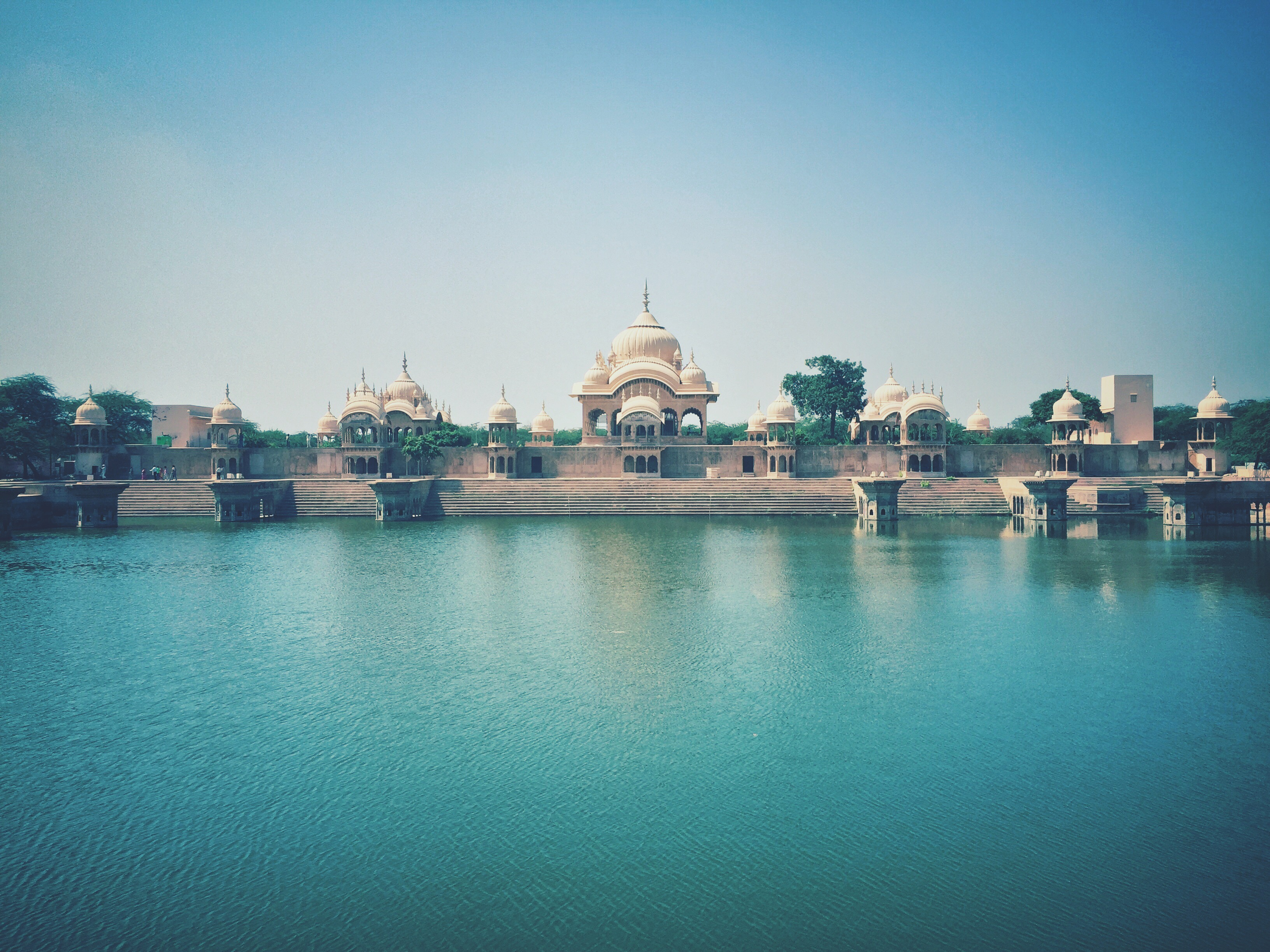
Kusum Sarovar, Govardhan after extensive restoration, 2017

Govardhan Giriraj Temple, Mathura dedicated to Krishna

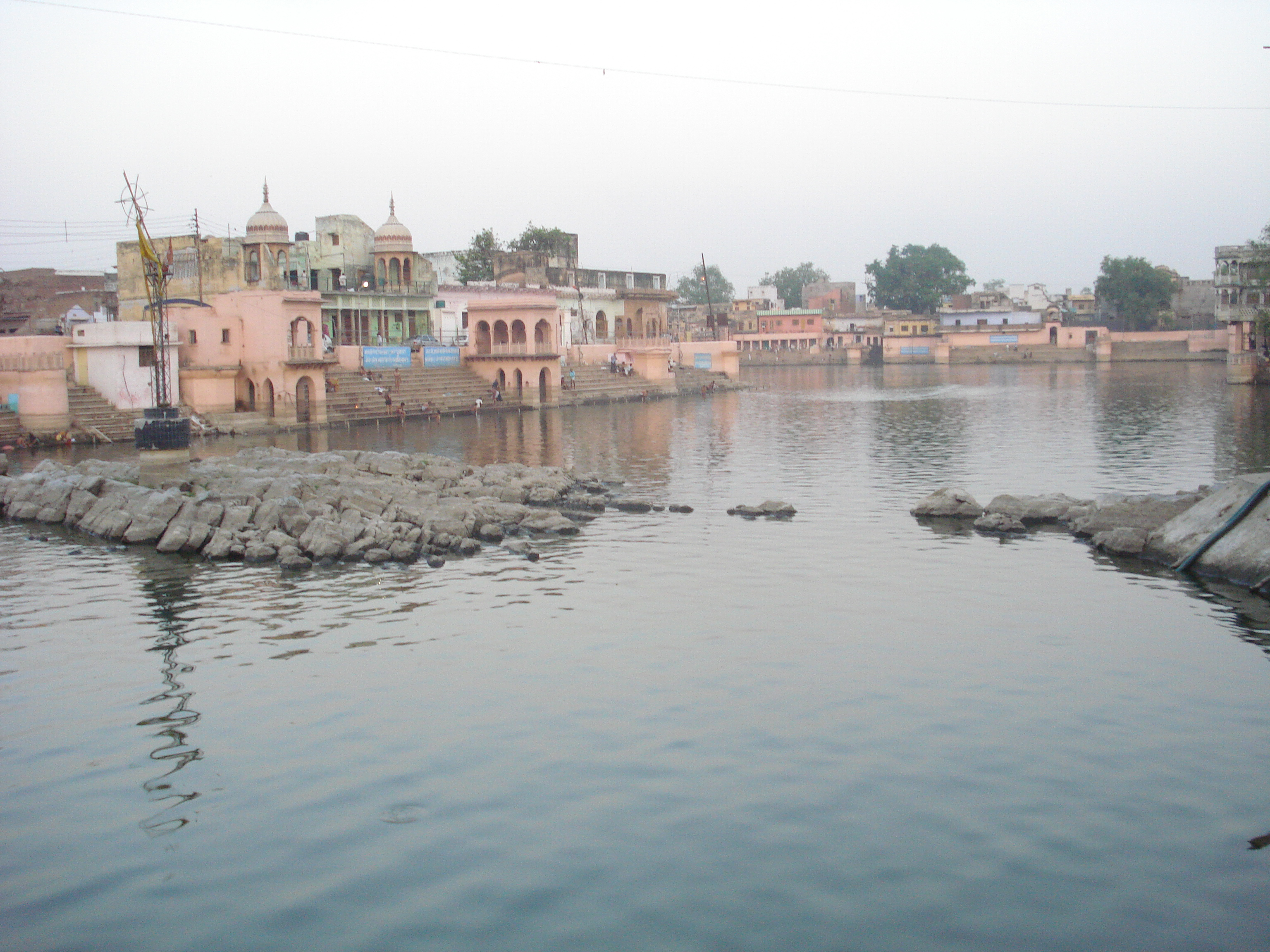
Mansi Ganga

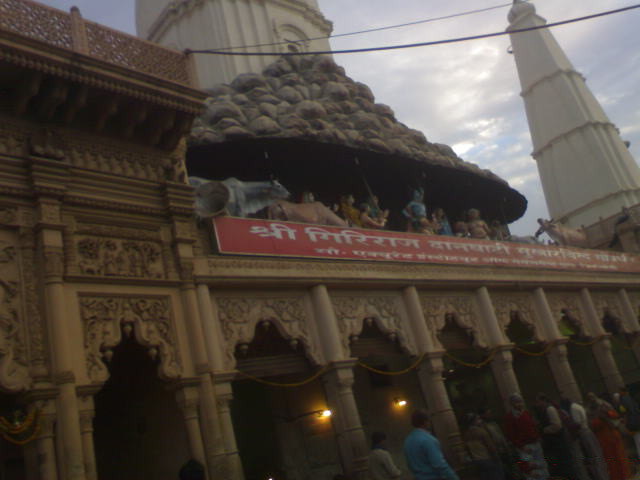
Temple dedicated to Govardhan

== Legends ==
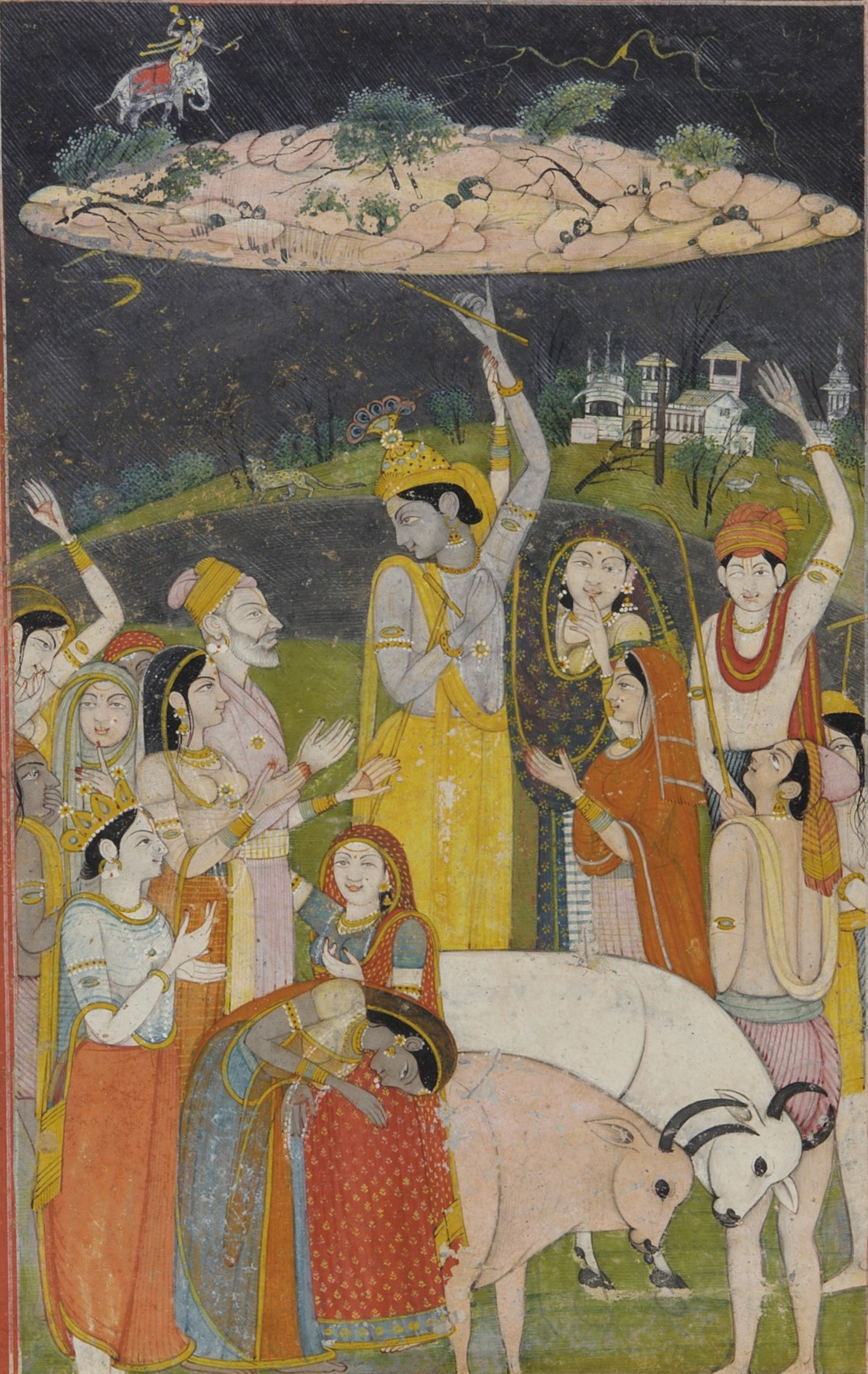
Krishna holding Govardhan Hill from Smithsonian Institution's collections

There are legends of Krishna saving the hill from a flood, his dalliances with gopis (cow-herders), and his interactions with demons and gods. The hill is regarded as a manifestation of Krishna, and its groves, ponds, caves, and water tank (kund) are associated with events in Krishna's life. Krishna and his brother Balarama grazed cows on its slopes, and Radha and the gopis met him in its wooded groves. Artwork has been created representing the hill as a bull and a peacock, as a mountain of food, and in the floods brought on by Indra. It has also portrayed Krishna in a cave and the hill with the Yamuna River.

== Recent development ==
In 2018, the Uttar Pradesh Chief Minister declared Govardhan as a pilgrimage centre along with Mathura, Baldev, Nandgaon, Radha Kund, and Gokul. The U.P. Government has also planned to rejuvenate Govardhan Parvat with Dvapara Yuga flora such as kadamb, karoli, tamal, pakkad, and tilkan.

In March 2026, The President of India, Draupadi Murmu visited Danghati Temple in Govardhan and offered prayers. She also took the traditional Govardhan Parikrama during her visit.

== See also ==
- Govardhan Puja
- Govardhana Shila
- Kusum Sarovar
- Sacred mountains of India
- Vrindavan
