= Kusum Sarovar =

Historic and sacred site in Vrindavan, Uttar Pradesh

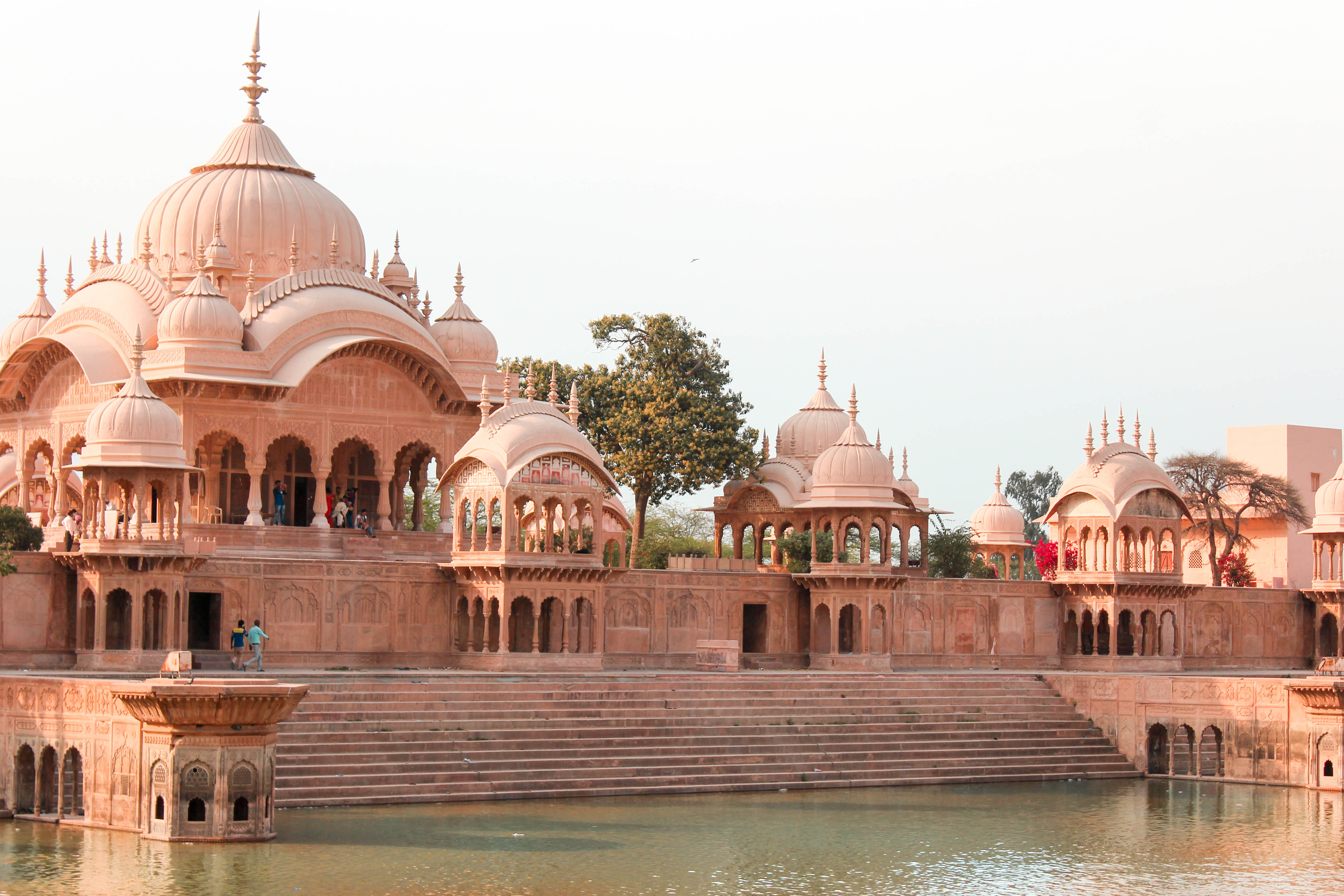
- Kusum Sarovar, Govardhan after extensive restoration, 2017

- Location of Kusum Sarovar in Uttar Pradesh
- 27°30′43.86″N 77°28′39.61″E
- Location: Mathura district, Uttar Pradesh, India

History
- Built for: Radha Krishna

Site notes
- Architectural style: Rajasthani
- Restored by: King Jawahar Singh

Kusum Sarovar is considered in Hinduism a sacred water reservoir with a historic sand monument in its backdrop. It is situated on the holy Govardhan Hill between Manasi Ganga and Radha Kund in Mathura district of Uttar Pradesh, India. Kusum Sarovar is considered one of the sacred spots that witnessed the pastimes of Hindu deities Radha and Krishna. Kusum Sarovar has Narada Kund, where Bhakti Sutra verses were written by Narada and the Sri Sri Radha Bana Bihari Temple in the vicinity.

== Radha Krishna Legend ==
Kusum Sarovar dates back to the era of Radha Krishna. As the name suggests, Kusum Sarovar is a place surrounded by a variety of flowers and Kadamb trees. It is said that Radha would come here under the pretext of collecting flowers for her friends, but would secretly meet with Krishna and have playful conversations. According to legends, once while collecting flowers, Radha's dress got stuck in thorns and Krishna came to help Radharani disguised as the gardener and took out her stuck dress from the thorns. It is also believed that Krishna used to play hide and seek with his friends on this ancient site and would collect flowers to make garlands for Radha.

== Architecture ==
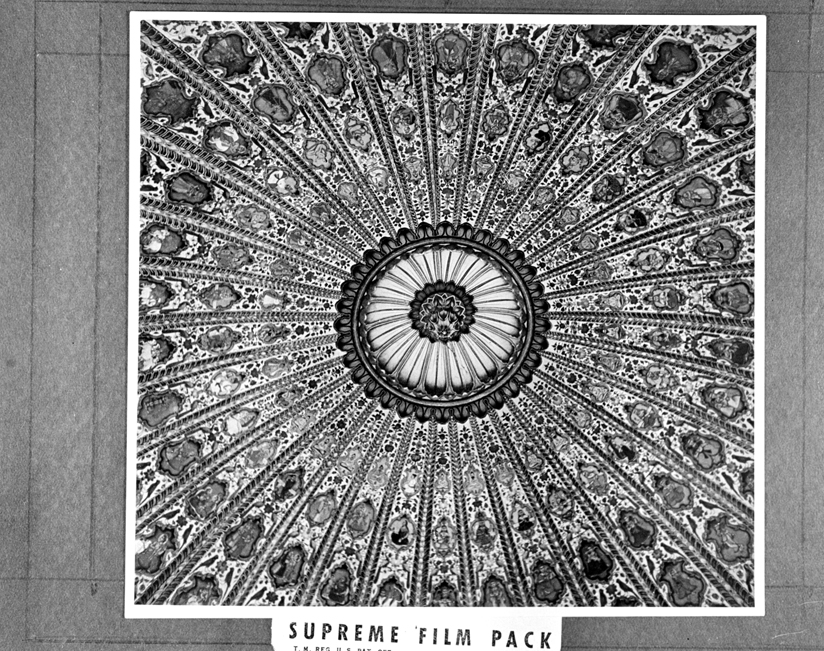
The ceiling of King Surajmal’s cenotaph, 1949

=== Kusum Sarovar Ghat ===
Kusum Sarovar ghat is 450 feet long and 60 feet deep tank. The ghats (banks) of pond has Rajasthani structure. On all four sides of the Kusum Sarovar, there is a series of steps that lead upward to the historical building made by King Jawahar Singh. The arcade walls that surround the pond boast a depth of around 60 m. Filled with emerald green water, the pond is bordered on all sides by forest containing variety of flowers.

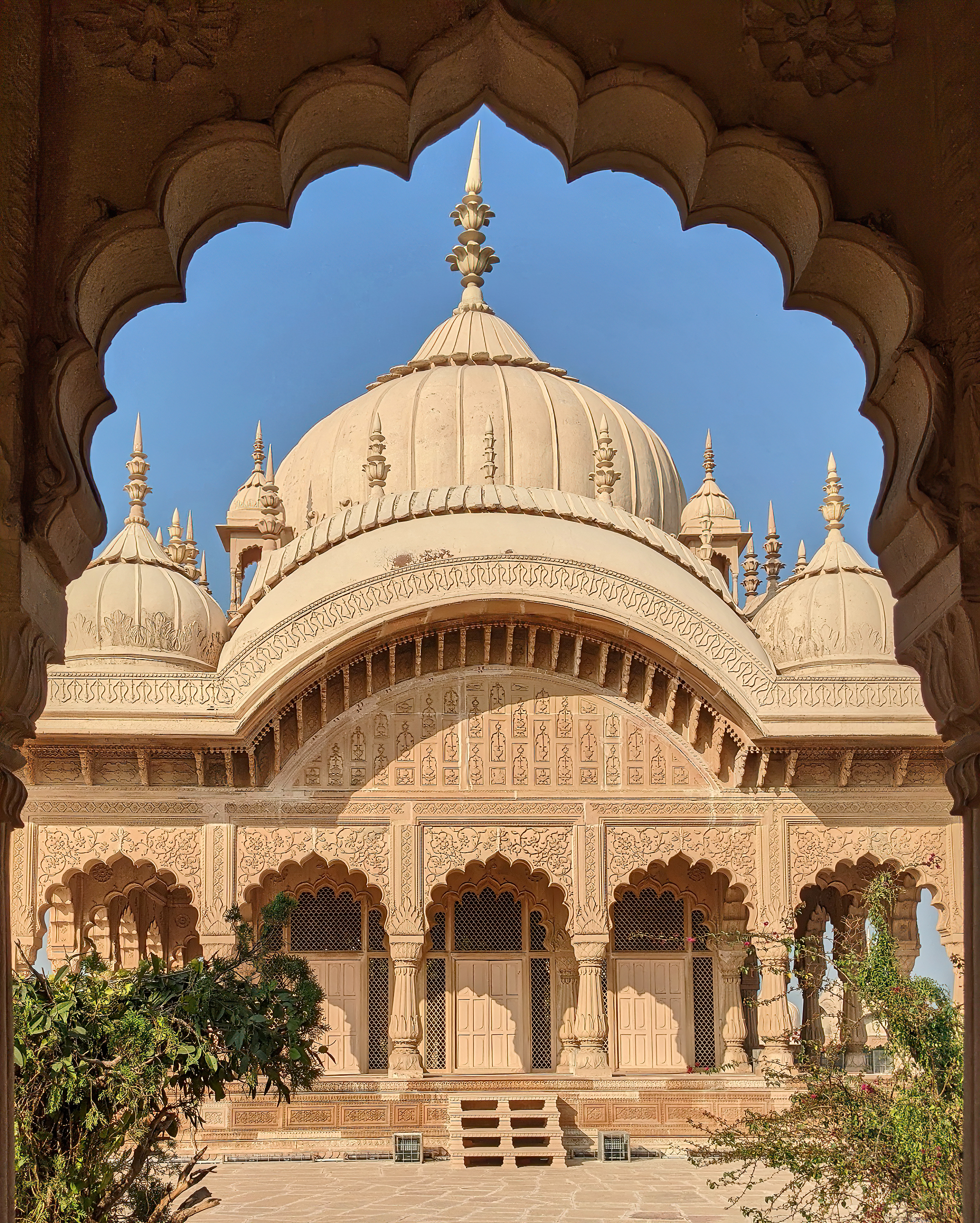
The cenotaph

=== Monumental Structure ===
King Jawahar Singh constructed the historical monument in memory of his parents. The main tomb is dedicated to King Suraj Mal which is erected in the area of 57 square feet is located in the center of monumental structure. On both sides of this tomb, there are two other historical structures that are comparatively smaller in size. These tombs were dedicated to two queens of King Suraj Mall - Kishori and Hansiya. The entire construction is supported by a 460 feet long terrace along with a pavilion, which serves as the cover protecting both the ends of the structure. The architecture and carving inside the tomb is in the pierced stone style and the ceiling of cenotaphs are adorned with the beautiful paintings depicting the divine pastimes of Radha Krishna and events of Maharajs Suraj Mal's court. The structure also houses a replica of the lotus feet of Lord Krishna and Radha.

== Significance ==
Kusum Sarovar is one of the important tourist attraction of Braj region. Pilgrims from all over the country visit the lake to explore the magnificent structures that surround the Sarovar (pond) and he beautiful paintings depicting the life of Krishna and his pastimes with Radha. It is believed that Radha Krishna has performed many pastimes here. Chaitanya Mahaprabhu, a Vaishnava saint and a great devotee of Krishna also used to visit this pond during his time in Vrindavan. During the time of Chaitanya Mahaprabhu, Kusum Sarovar was also called Suman Sarovar. It is said that anyone who take dips in the pond of Kusuma Sarovara will achieve pure love of Krishna.

== Timings ==
The time zone (UTC+05:30) observed through India by the local authorities -

Everyday - 6:00 AM to 6:00 PM.

== Gallery ==
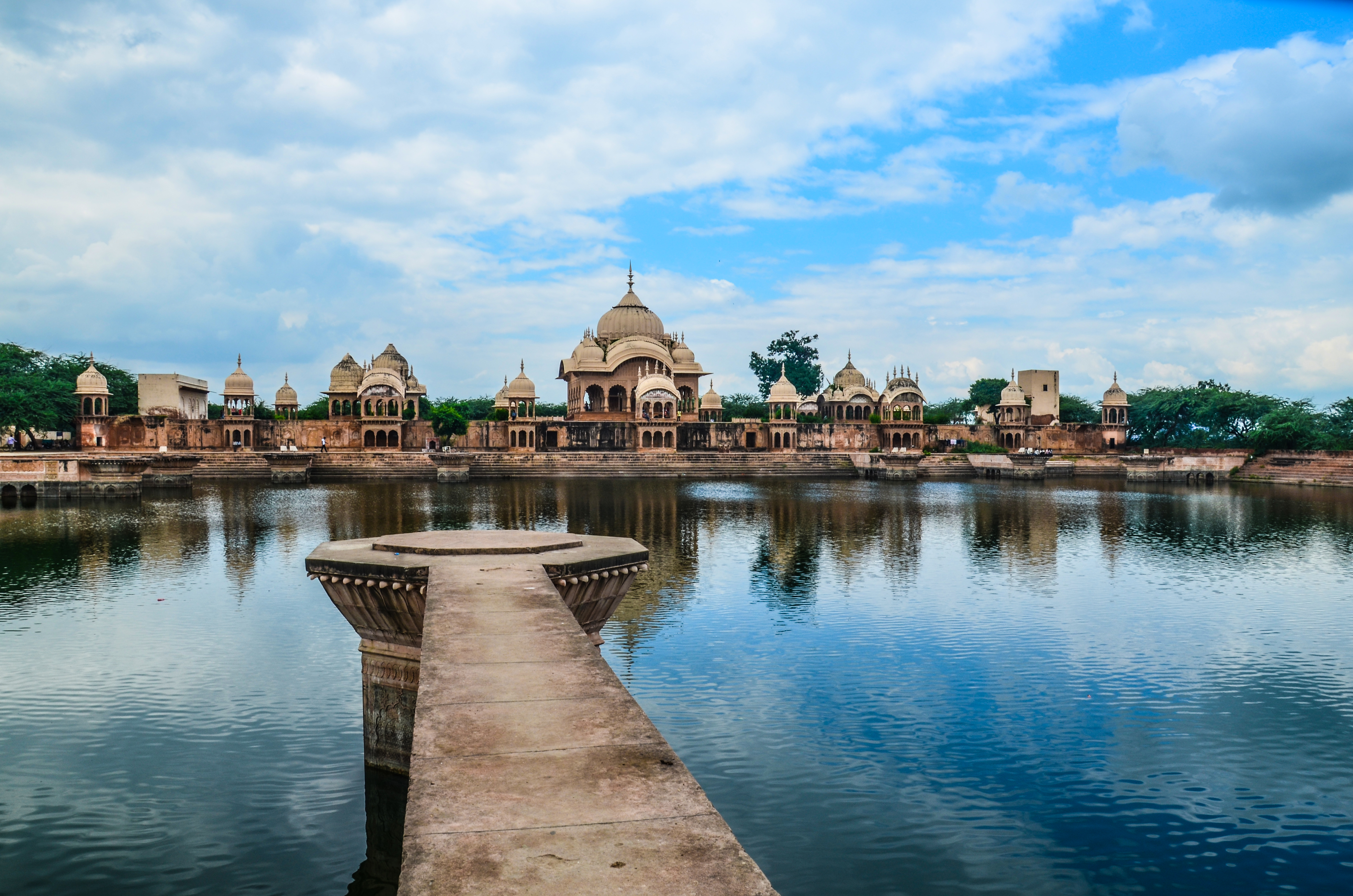
Landscape of Kusum Sarovar

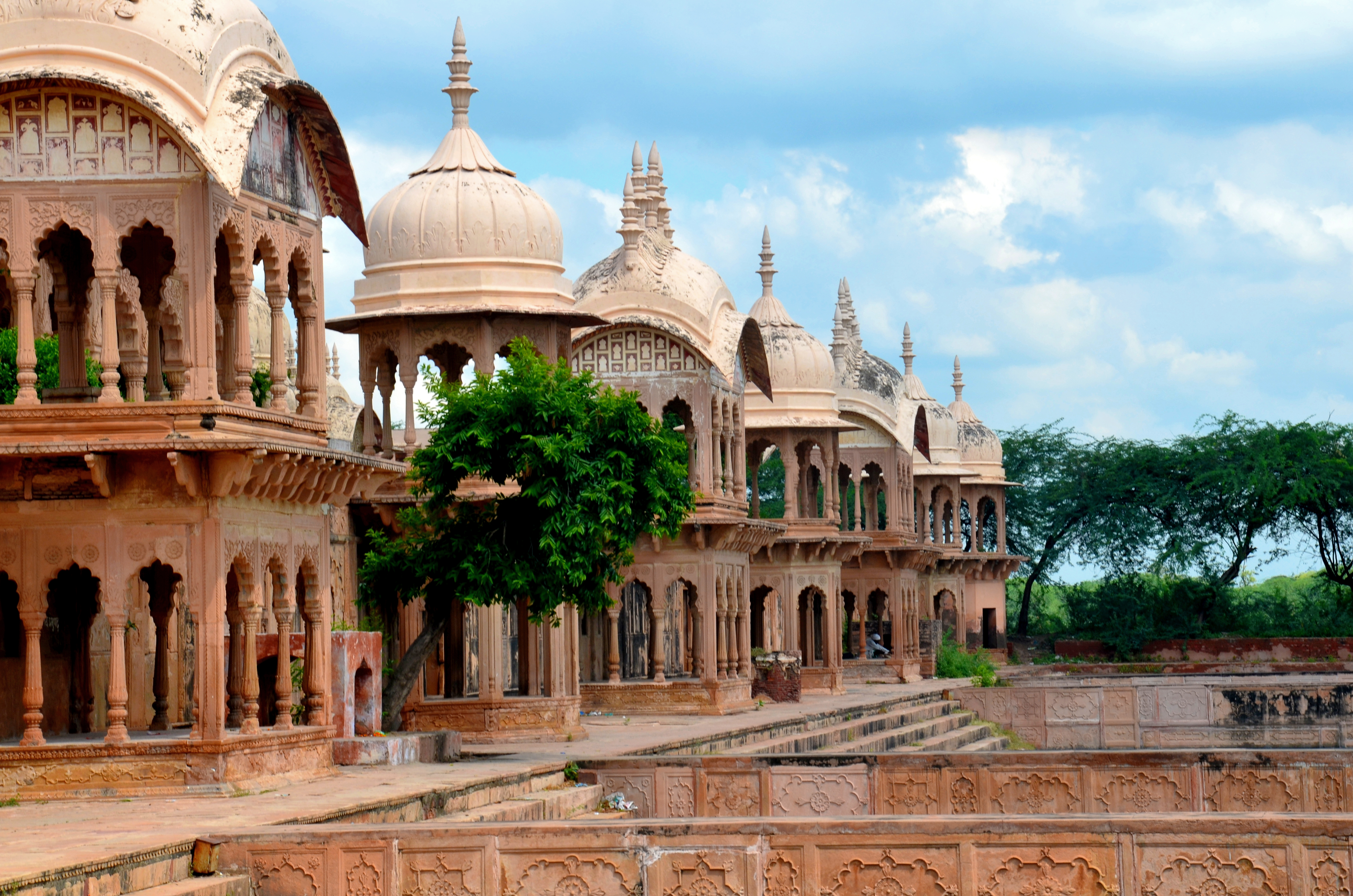
Side view of Kusum Sarovar

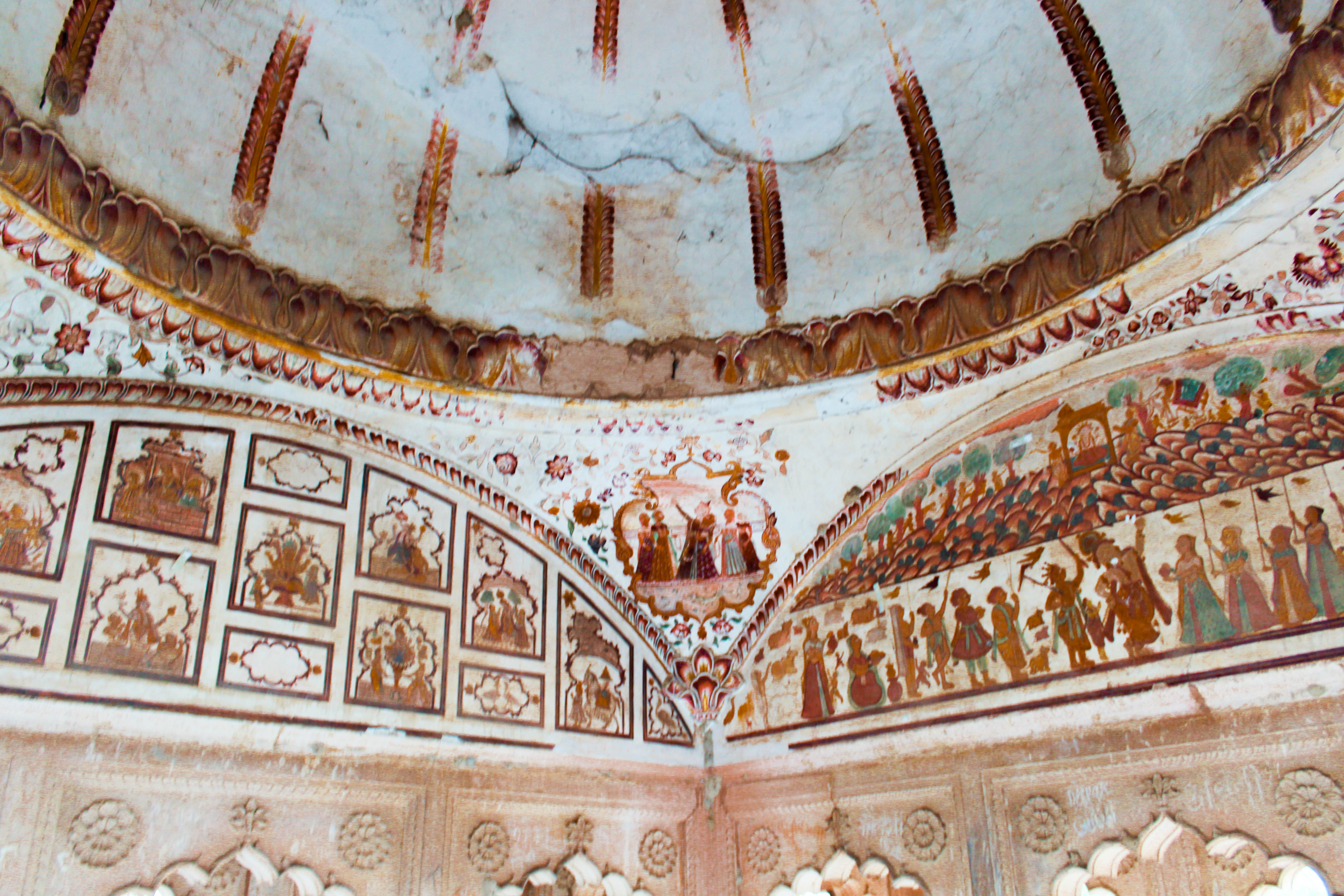
Artwork inside the Monument

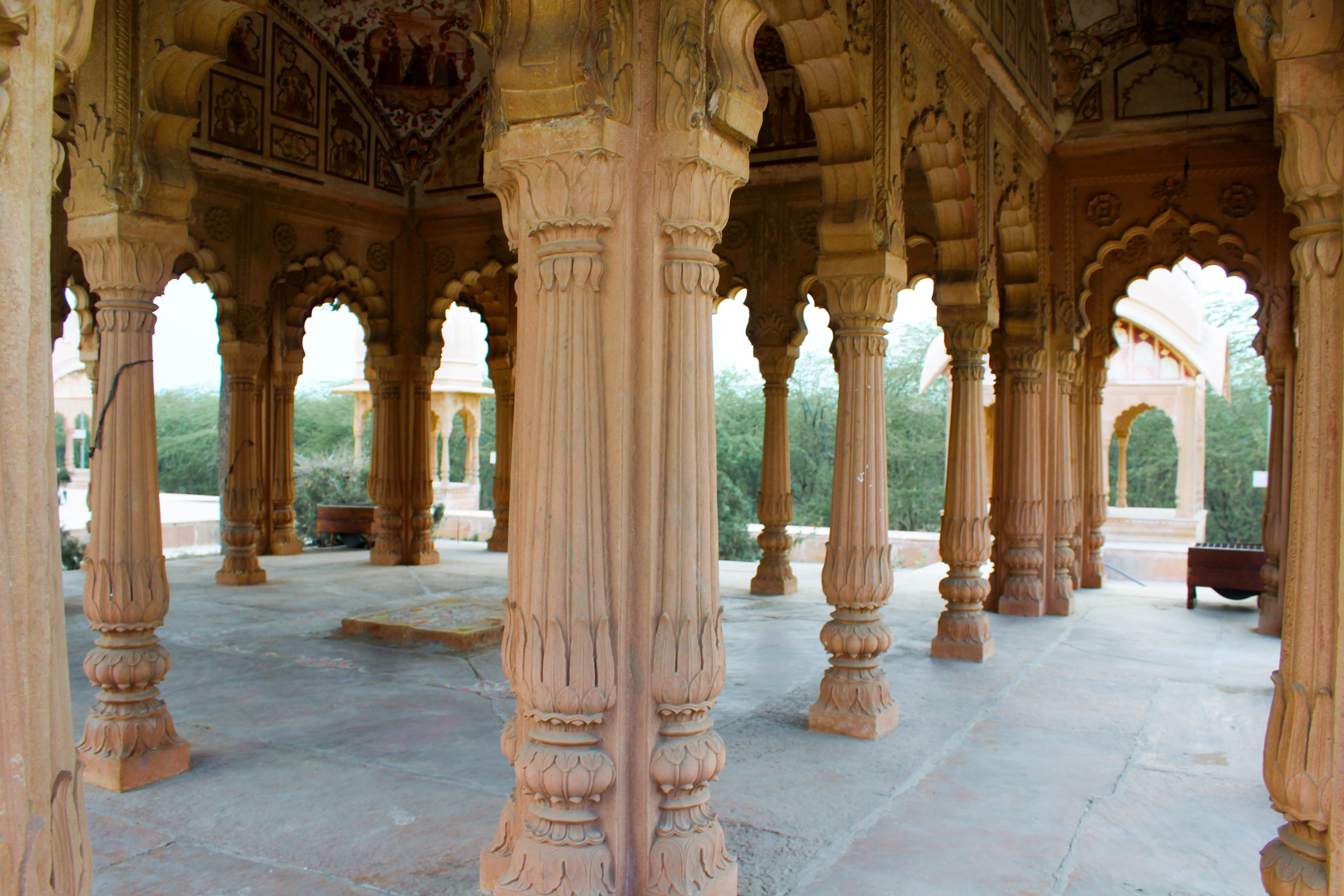
Interior of Monument

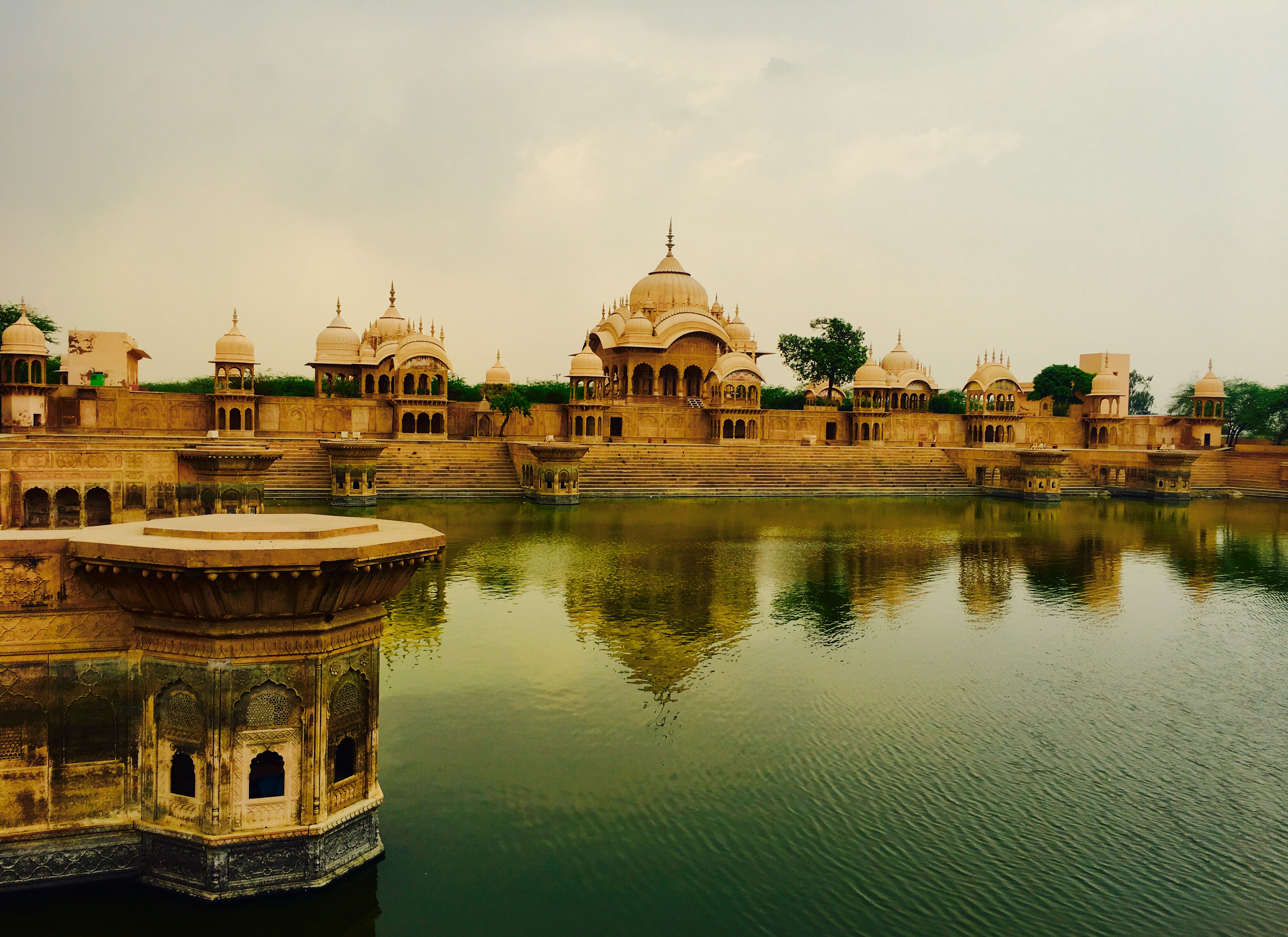
Ghat of Kusum Sarovar

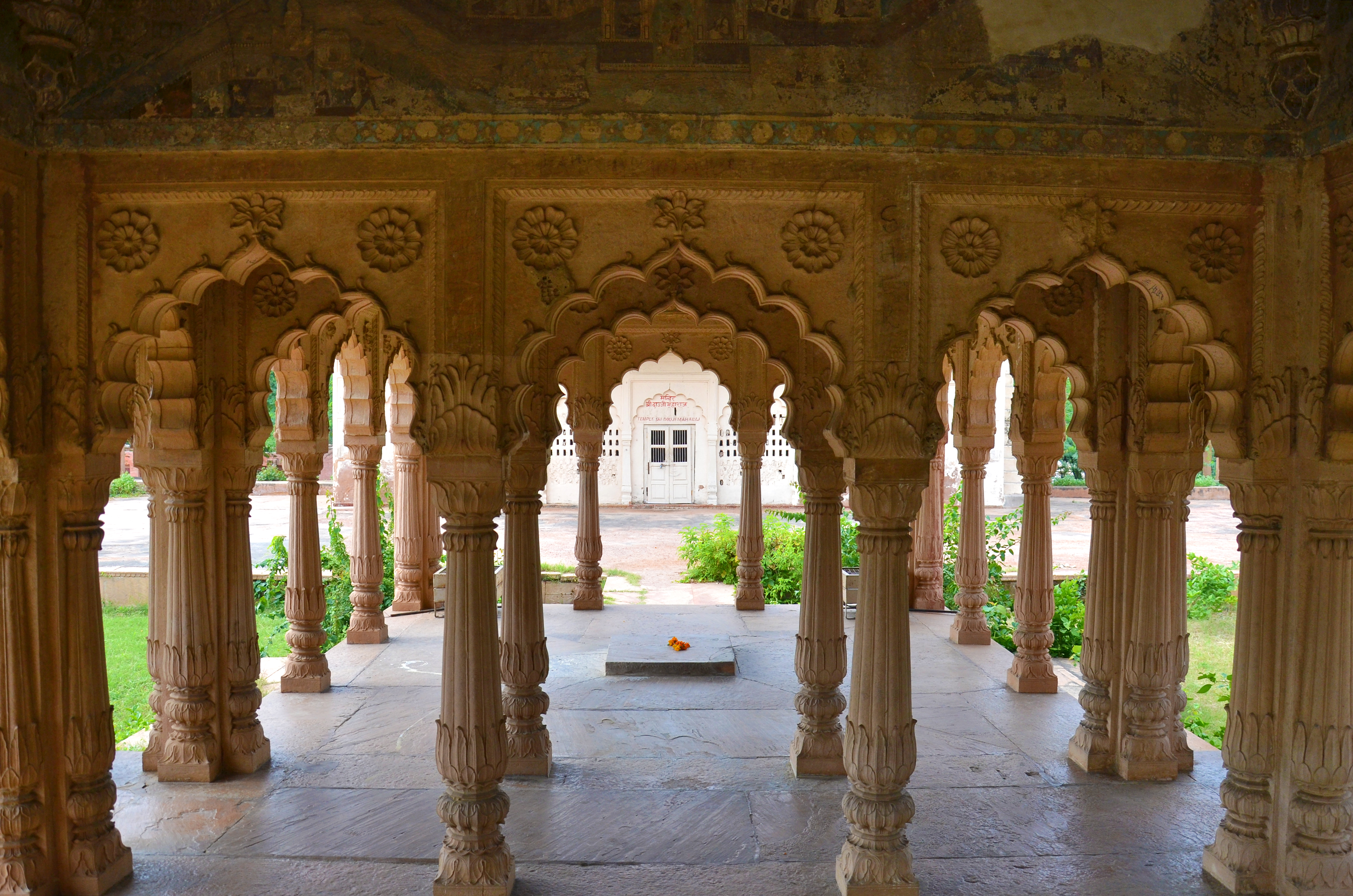
Pillars of monument

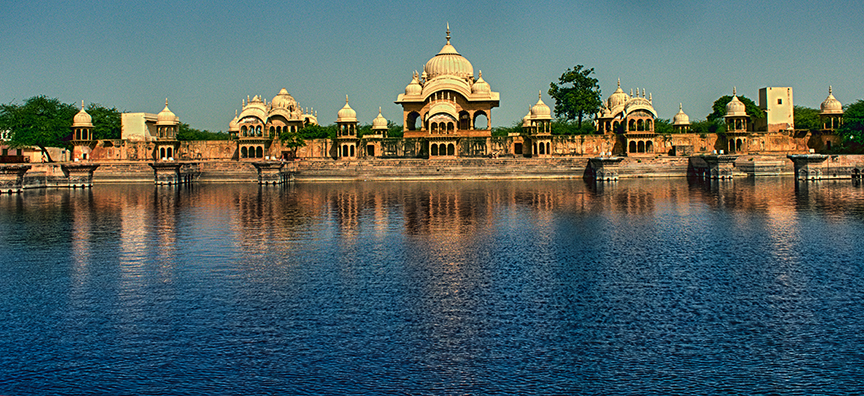
Front view of Kusum Sarovar

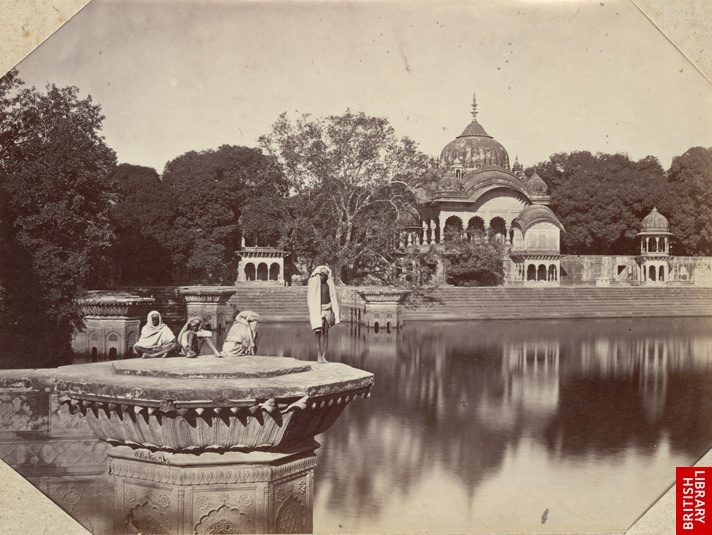
View across the Kusum Sarovar Tank towards Suraj Mal's Cenotaph, 1860s

== See also ==
- Radha Kund
- Goverdhan Hill
- Radha Krishna
- Nidhivan, Vrindavan
- Vrindavan
