= Govardhan Puja =

Hindu festival

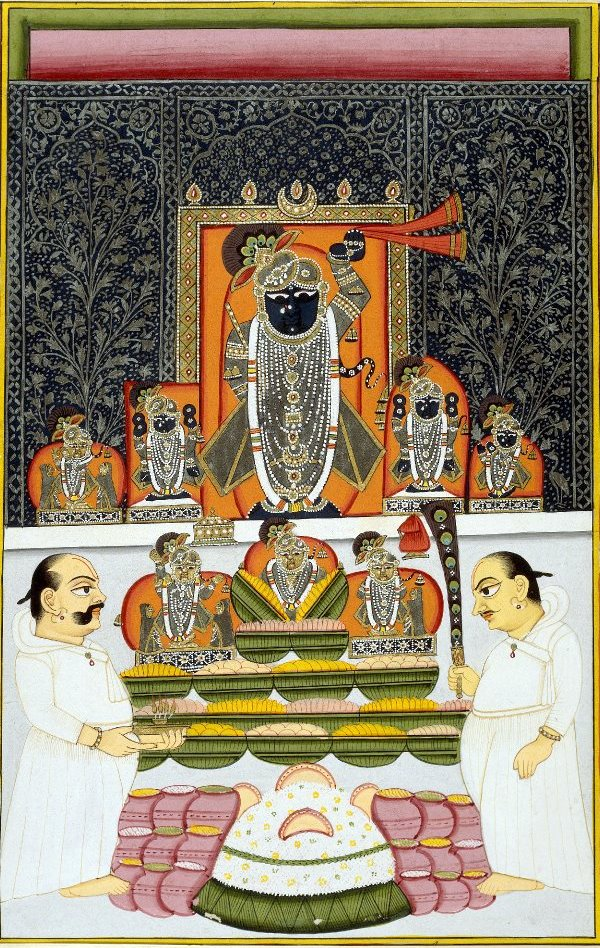
- Painting of Annakut feast offered to Krishna icons in Nathdwara, late 18th century
- Also called: Annakoot
- Observed by: Hindu
- Type: Hindu
- Significance: Commemorates Lord Krishna lifting Govardhan Hill
- Date: Pratipada Tithi of Shukla Paksha in the month of Kartik
- 2025 date: 22 October
- Frequency: Annually
- Related to: Diwali

Govardhan Puja (IAST: Govardhana-pūjā) or Annakut (meaning a “mountain of food”), is a Hindu festival celebrated on the first lunar day of the bright fortnight of the month of Kartika, on the fourth day of Diwali. Devotees worship an image of Govardhan Hill made out of cow dung and prepare and offer a wide variety of vegetarian food to Krishna as an expression of gratitude. For Vaishnavas, this day commemorates the incident in the Bhagavata Purana when Krishna lifted Govardhan Hill to provide the villagers of Vrindavan shelter from torrential rains. Peoples of Vrindavan used to worship Indra for rain. This incident symbolizes God offering protection to devotees who take singular refuge in him. Devotees offer a mountain of food, metaphorically representing the Govardhan Hill, to God as a ritual remembrance and to renew their faith in taking refuge in God. The festival is observed by most Hindu denominations all over India and abroad.

It is an important festival in Vaishanava sects, such as the Pushtimarg Sampradaya, Gaudiya Sampradaya and Swaminarayan Sampradaya.

== Origin ==
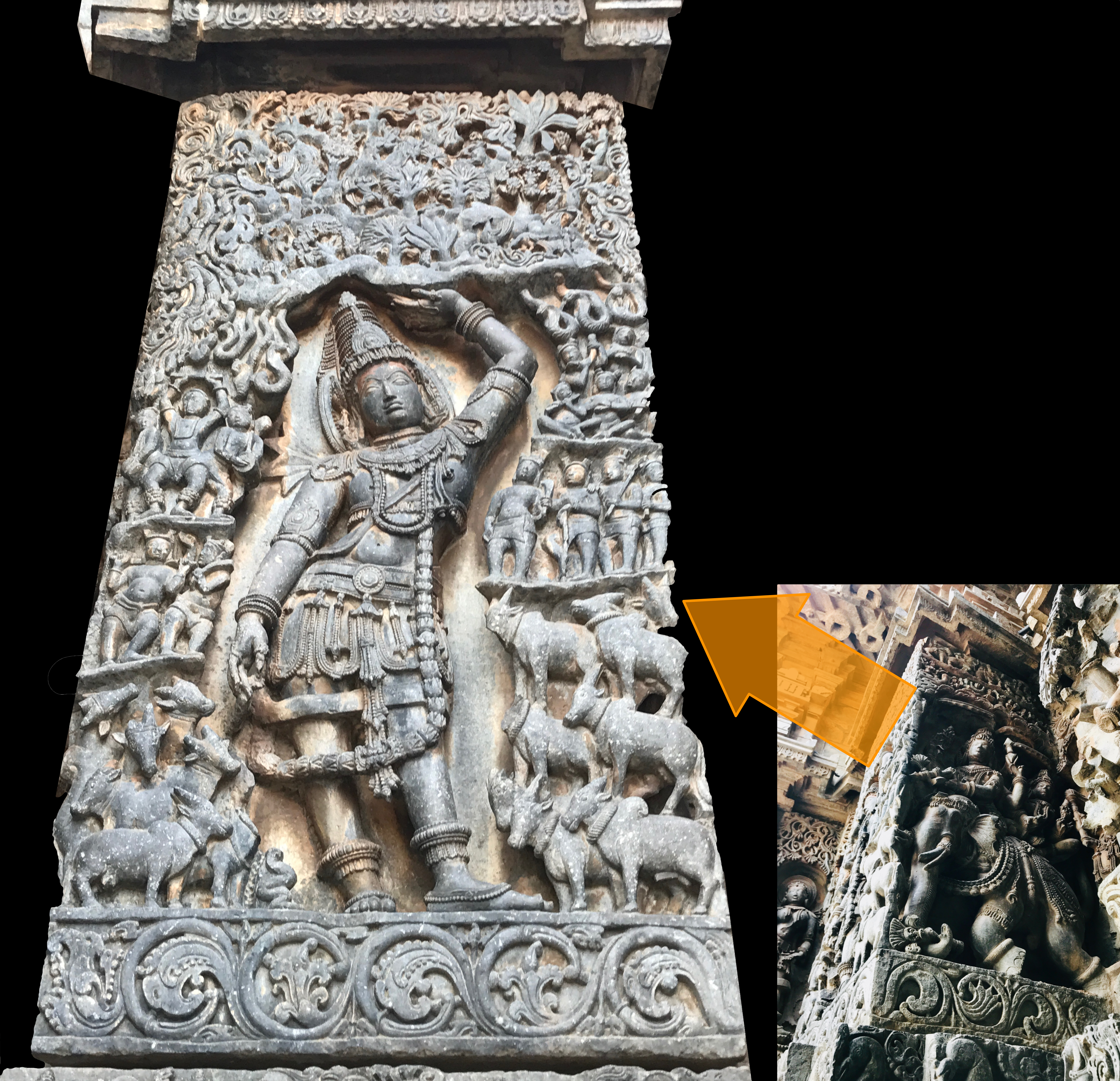
Krishna holding the Govardhan, a historic legend is depicted in many major Hindu temples complexes. This panel is from the Hoysaleswara temple, Halebidu Karnataka (c. 1150 CE). The stone block was carved to show the Krishna legend, and Indra behind it.

Krishna spent most of his childhood in Braj, a place devotees associate with many of Krishna's divine and heroic exploits with his childhood friends. One of the most significant incidents, described in the Bhagavata Purana, involves Krishna lifting Govardhan Hill, a low hill situated in the middle of Braj. According to the Bhagavata Purana, forest-dwelling cowherds living close to Govardhan used to celebrate the autumn season by paying respect to Indra, the god of rain and storm. Krishna wanted to break the ego of Indra so he asked villagers not to worship Indra this time. Indra got angry with this.

Krishna, though being younger than almost everyone in the city, was respected by everyone due to his knowledge and immense power. So, the people of Gokul agreed with Krishna's advice. Indra was angered upon seeing the villagers' devotion diverted away from him and toward Krishna. Indra decided to initiate thunderstorms and heavy rains in the city because of his anger. To protect the people from the storms, Krishna lifted Govardhan Hill on his little finger and provided shelter to all the people and cattle of the city. After seven days of continuous storms, seeing the people of Gokul unaffected, Indra accepted defeat and stopped the storms. This day is therefore celebrated as a festival that paid respect to Mount Govardhan by preparing a giriyajna- a "great offering of foods and delicacies to the mountain" Krishna then assumed the form of a mountain himself and accepted the villagers' offerings.

== Rituals and Celebrations ==
Govardhan has since become a major pilgrimage site in Braj for devotees of Krishna. On the day of Annakut, devotees circumambulate the hill and offer food to the mountain—and old ritual in Braj, established by Chaitanya Mahaprabhu. The circumambulation consists of an eleven-mile trek dotted along the way with several shrines, before which devotees place flowers and other offerings. Others may circumambulate the mountain by offering dandavats (full body prostrations) which can take ten to twelve days.

Families create an image of Govardhan Hill from cow dung, adorning it with miniature cow figures as well as grass as twigs, representing trees and greenery. In the days leading up to Annakut, fifty-six food items (chappan bhog) are typically prepared and offered in the evening. A member from the cow-herding caste officiates the ritual, circling the hill with a cow and a bull, followed by families in the village. They partake in the sanctified food after offering the food to the hill. The festival often draws a large crowd, including the Chaube brahmins of Mathura.

Annakut is celebrated on the fourth day of Diwali. Therefore, the rituals surrounding Annakut are closely linked with the rituals of the five days of Diwali. While the first three days of Diwali are days of prayer to sanctify wealth and invite greater wealth into the devotee's life, the annakut day is a day of offering gratitude for Krishna beneficence.

=== Govardhan Puja ===
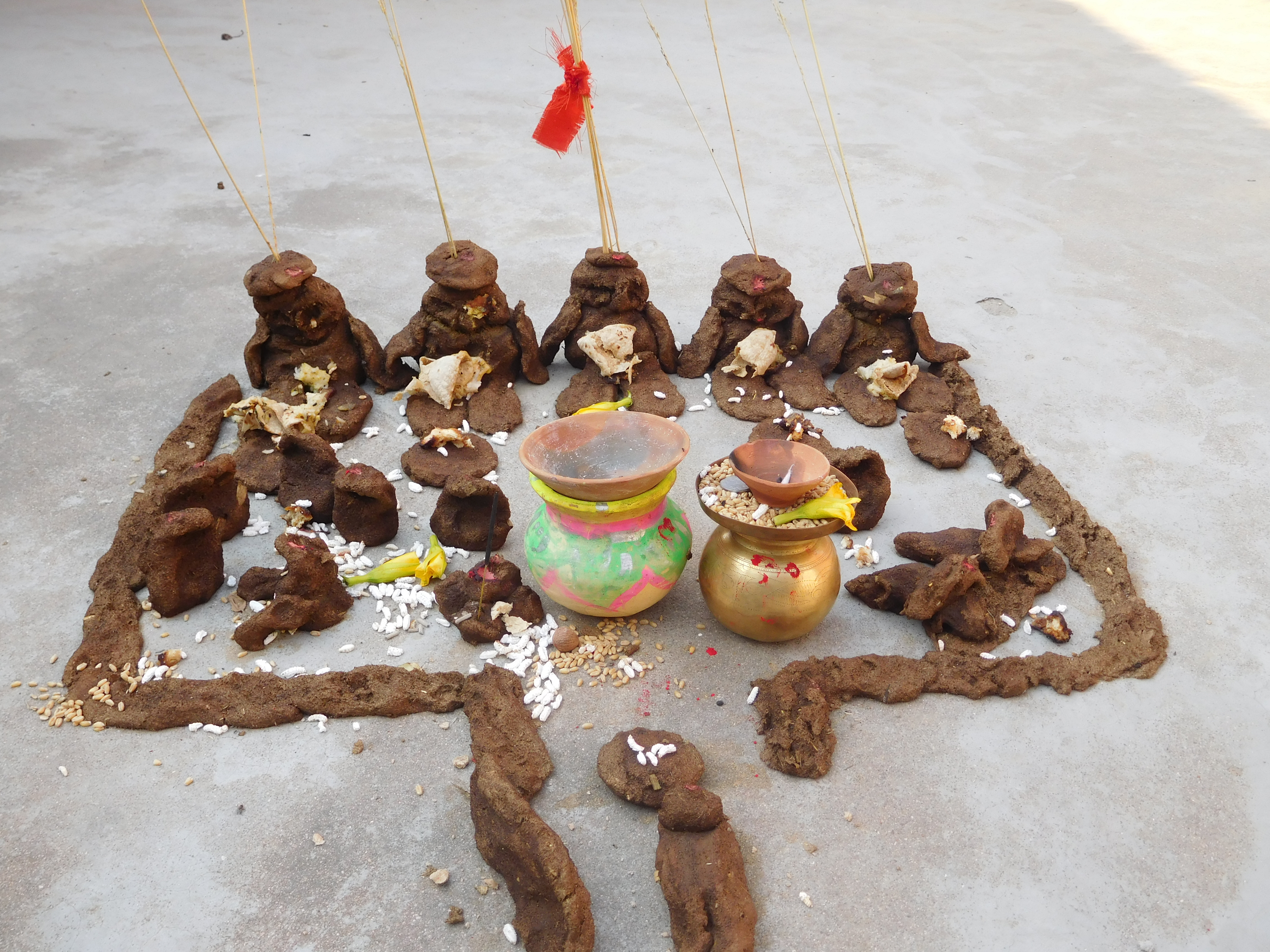
Govardhan Puja

Govardhan Puja is a principal ritual performed during Annakut. Although some texts treat Govardhan Puja and Annakut as synonymous, the Govardhan Puja is one segment of the day-long Annakut festival.

There are many variants of how Govardhan Puja is performed. In one variant of the ritual Krishna is made out of cow dung in horizontal position. After completing the structure, it is decorated by earthern lamps (deepak or diya), seenkh (a material used for broom chaffs), and candles. After worshipping, the structure of the god is fed by devotees, and women fast. Prayers are also made to Govardhan.

=== Annkut Festival ===
After Rajbhog preparations are done for Govardhan Puja. Offer tilak to Girirajji After Govardhan puja God comes to consume AnnaKut. Samagri can be offered as per capacity. (Pustimarg Sampradaya)

Vast array of vegetarian foods is traditionally arranged in tiers or steps in front of the deities. Usually, the sweets are placed nearest to the deities. As the tiers descend, other foods such as dal, vegetables, pulses, and fried savory foods are arranged. A mound of cooked grains, symbolic of Mount Govardhan, is placed in the center. In Swaminarayan shikharbaddh mandirs, sadhus begin to arrange the Annakut in the morning and finish before noon.

Many Hindus throughout the world celebrate Annakut as a part of Diwali and, most frequently, pair the Annakut celebration with the Govardhan Puja performed on fourth day of Diwali celebrations. Hindus also view Annakut as a time to transmit religious and cultural values to children, ask for forgiveness from God and express devotion towards God. Annakut is celebrated with diyas (small oil lamps) and rangoli, decorative art on the ground made from colored rice, colored sand, and/or flower petals. Many distinct food items, sometimes numbering in the hundreds or thousands, are offered to deities during Annakut. For example, 250 kilograms of food were offered to Krishna at the ISKCON temple in Mysore, India in 2009. Although Annakut is most often associated with Krishna, other deities are also focal points. At the Shree Mahalakshmi Mandir in Mumbai, India, 56 sweets and food items are offered to Mataji and then distributed as prasad to more than 500 devotees.

The Annakut festival is also celebrated annually at approximately 3,850 BAPS Mandirs and centers throughout the world in a day-long event. During the festival, Swaminarayan devotees prepare and offer a large variety of vegetarian food to Hindu deities including Swaminarayan and Krishna, among others. The Annakut festival at BAPS mandirs is often the largest festival of the year. Visitors learn about Hinduism, offer prayers for the new year, partake in the prasad, or sanctified food, and engage in other devotional activities. A devotee at the BAPS Swaminarayan Mandir in Leicester, England, which organizes the Annakut festival every year, describes Annakut as being a forum where spiritual aspirants can reaffirm their appreciation for the role God plays in their lives. These gatherings also represent an opportunity to reaffirm a sense of community. At the BAPS Swaminarayan Mandir in Neasden, England in 2004, 1247 vegetarian dishes were assembled and offered to the deities during the Annakut celebrations in 2000 at the BAPS Swaminarayan Mandir in Neasden, England.

The Guinness World record for the largest Annakut ever held was on October 27, 2019 (Diwali) in BAPS Atladra Mandir in Gujarat with over 3500 vegetarian dishes.

=== Thaal ===
In all Swaminarayan mandirs, sadhus and devotees then sing thaal - kirtans or devotional hymns composed by the poet paramhansas of Swaminarayan. These kirtans describe the food items, and are about praying to the deities to accept the food. The singing lasts for about an hour, and is followed by a grand arti. Afterwards, devotees do puja and circumambulate the deities and the offered food. In some mandirs, arti is performed several times in the day as long as the annakut offerings remain before the deities. In the evening, devotees take portions of the Annakut as prasad, sanctified food, that has been offered to God and is received as his mercy.

In certain mandirs, especially in Mathura and Nathadwara, the murtis are also given a milk bath before being and dressed in elegant clothes and ornaments.

=== Vishvakarma Puja ===
Some craftsmen pay reverence to their tools and machinery on the day of Annakut.

== See also ==
- Rawal, Uttar Pradesh, Radha birthplace
