= Radha =

Hindu goddess of love and chief consort of the god Krishna

- Mūlaprakriti - Primordial goddess Mother Goddess; Hladini shakti ("blissful energy"); Goddess of Love, Compassion and Devotion; Supreme Goddess in Krishnaism
- Member of Panch Prakriti
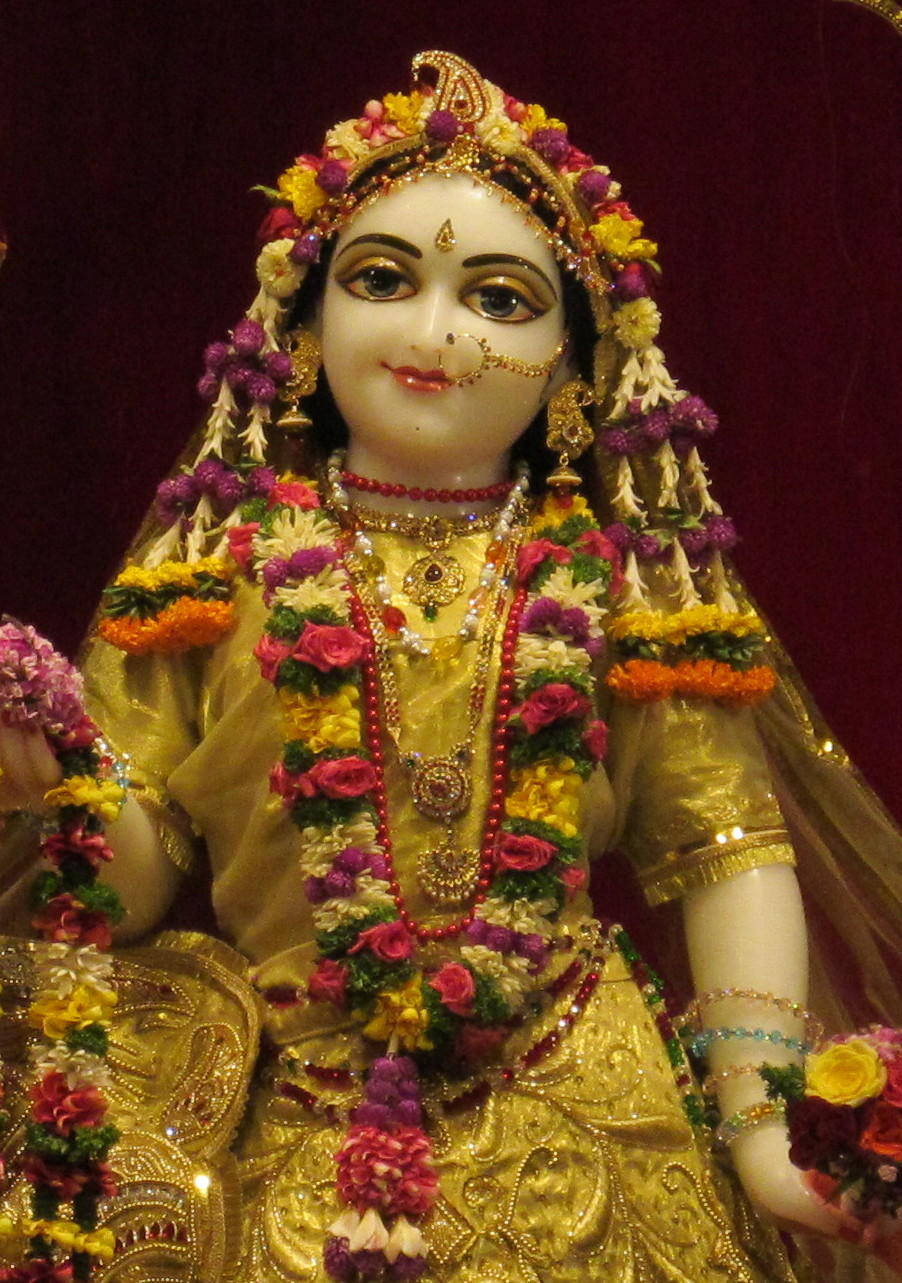
- Idol of Radha at ISKCON Temple, Pune
- Other names: Madhavi, Keshavi, Shreeji, Shyama, Kishori, Radharani, Radhey
- Devanagari: राधा
- Sanskrit transliteration: Rādhā
- Venerated in: Radha Vallabh Sampradaya, Nimbarka Sampradaya, Gaudiya Vaishnavism, Pushtimarg, Mahanam Sampradaya, Manipuri Vaishnavism, Swaminarayan Sampradaya, Vaishnava-Sahajiya, Haridasi Sampradaya
- Affiliation: Radha Krishna; Devi; Hladini shakti of Krishna; Avatar of Lakshmi
- Abode: Goloka; Vrindavan; Barsana; Vaikuntha
- Mantra: Om hreem Radhikaye namah; Om Radhaye svaha; Om hreem shreem Radhikaye svaha
- Symbol: Golden Lotus
- Day: Friday
- Texts: Brahma Vaivarta Purana, Devi-Bhagavata Purana, Naradiya Purana, Padma Purana, Skanda Purana, Shiva Purana, Gita Govinda, Gopala Tapani Upanishad, Garga Samhita, Brahma Samhita, Chaitanya Charitamrita
- Gender: Female
- Festivals: Radhashtami; Holi; Sharad Purnima; Kartik Purnima; Gopashtami; Lathmar Holi; Jhulan Purnima

Genealogy
- Avatar birth: Raval, Barsana (present-day Uttar Pradesh, India)
- Parents: Vrishabhanu (father); Kirtida (mother)
- Consort: Krishna
- Dynasty: Yaduvamsha-Chandravamsha

Radha (Sanskrit: राधा, IAST: Rādhā), also called Radhika, is a Hindu goddess and the chief consort of the god Krishna. She is revered as goddess of love, tenderness, compassion and devotion. In scriptures, Radha is mentioned as the avatar of Lakshmi and also as the Mūlaprakriti, the Supreme goddess, who is the feminine counterpart and internal potency (hladini shakti) of Krishna. Radha's birthday is celebrated every year on the occasion of Radhashtami.

Radha accompanies Krishna in all his incarnations. The Nimbarka Sampradaya and many other Vaishnava traditions worship Radha as the eternal consort and wedded wife of Krishna. In contrast, traditions like Gaudiya Vaishnavism revere her as Krishna's lover and the divine consort.

In Radha Vallabha Sampradaya and Haridasi Sampradaya, only Radha is worshipped as the Supreme being. Radha is described as the chief of Braj Gopis (milkmaids of Braj) and queen of Goloka and Braj including Vrindavan and Barsana. She has inspired numerous literary works, and her Raslila dance with Krishna has inspired many types of performance arts.

== Etymology and epithets ==
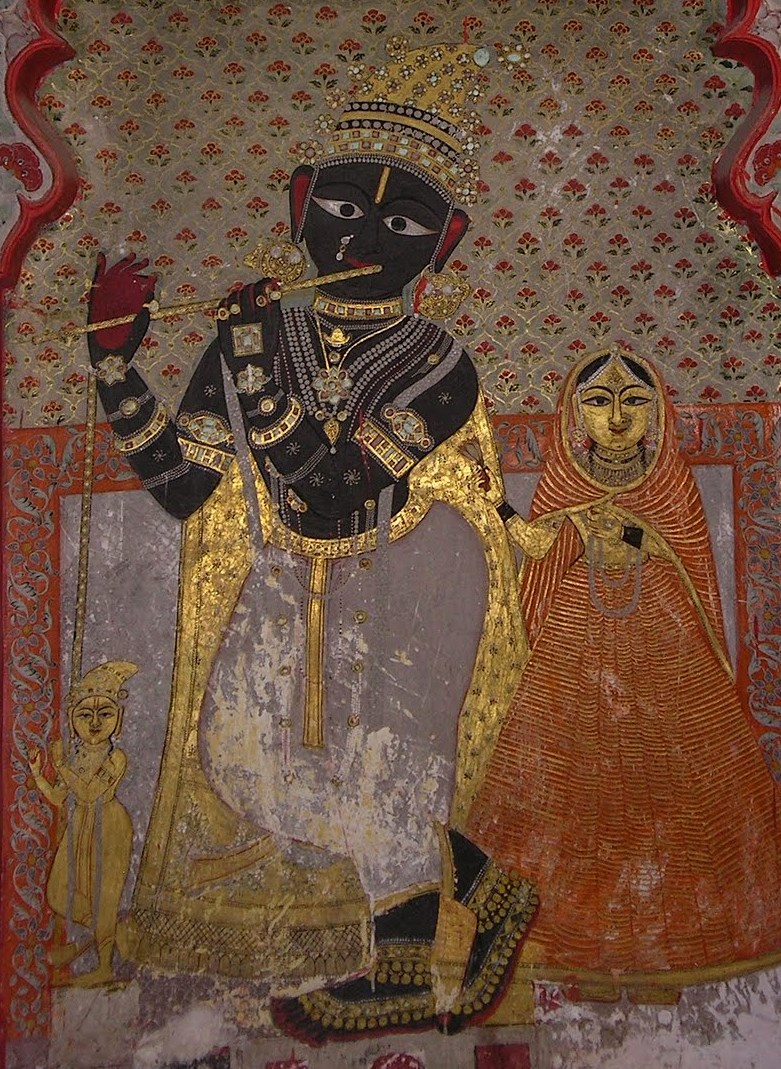
14th-century fresco of Radha (right) and Krishna (left, playing flute) in Udaipur, Rajasthan.

The Sanskrit term Rādhā (Sanskrit: राधा) means "prosperity, success, perfection and wealth". It is a common word and name found in various contexts in the ancient and medieval texts of India. The word appears in the Vedic literature as well as the Hindu epics, but is elusive. The name also appears for a figure in the epic Mahabharata. Rādhikā refers to an endearing form of Radha.

In chapter 15th, Goloka khanda of Garga Samhita, Sage Garga elaborates the complete meaning of Radha. In Radha, 'R' signifies Rama, goddess Lakshmi, 'a' means Gopis, "dh" signifies dhara, goddess Bhudevi and last 'a' symbolises River Virājā (also called Yamuna).

The fifth chapter, Fifth night of Narada Pancharatra mentioned 1008 names of Radha under the title Shri Radha Saharsnama Strotam. The 68th chapter, Tritiya paad of Narada Purana also listed 500 names of Radha. Some of the common names and epithets are:

- Sri, Shreeji, Shriji: Goddess of radiance, splendor and wealth; Lakshmi
- Madhavi: Feminine counterpart of Madhava
- Keshavi: Feminine form of Keshava
- Aparajita: She who is unconquerable
- Kishori: Youthful
- Nitya: She is eternal
- Nitya-gehinī: Krishna's eternal wife
- Gopi: Cowherd girl
- Shyama: Beloved of Shyam
- Gaurangi: She whose complexion is bright like the lustrous gold
- Raseshvari and Rasa-priya: Queen of Raslila and she who is fond of rasa dance
- Vrindavaneshvari: Queen of Vrindavan
- Krishneshvari: Feminine counterpart of Krishna

== Literary sources and symbolism ==
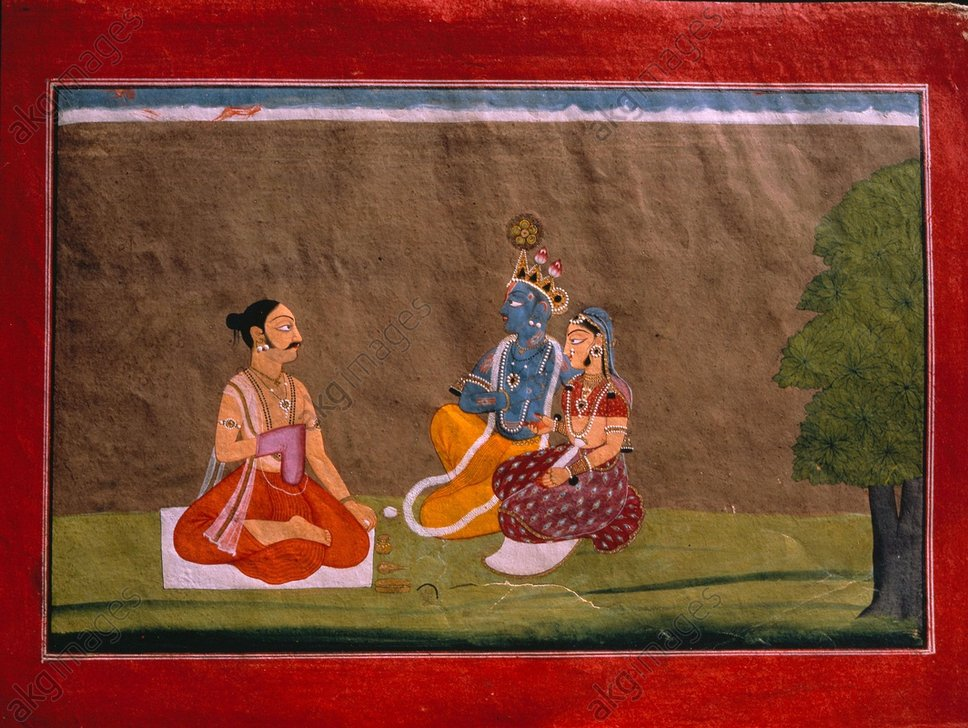
Jayadeva recites the mantra to Radha Krishna by Manaku.

Radha is an important goddess in the Vaishnavite traditions of Hinduism. Her traits, manifestations, descriptions, and roles vary by region. Radha is considered inseparable from Krishna. In early Indian literature, mentions of her are elusive. The traditions that venerate her explain this is because she is the secret treasure hidden within the sacred scriptures. During the Bhakti movement era in the sixteenth century, she became more well known as her extraordinary love for Krishna was highlighted.

Radha's first major appearance in the 12th-century Gita Govinda in Sanskrit by Jayadeva, as well as Nimbarkacharya's philosophical works. Thus in the Gita Govinda Krishna speaks to Radha:

O woman with desire, place on this patch of flower-strewn floor your lotus foot,
And let your foot through beauty win,
To me who am the Lord of All, O be attached, now always yours.
O follow me, my little Radha.

— Jayadeva, Gita Govinda

However, the source of Jayadeva's heroine in his poem remains a puzzle of the Sanskrit literature. A possible explanation is Jayadeva's friendship with Nimbarkacharya, the first acharya to establish the worship of Radha-Krishna. Nimbarka, in accordance with the Sahitya Akademi's Encyclopaedia, more than any other acharyas gave Radha a place as a deity.

Prior to Gita Govinda, Radha was also mentioned in text Gatha Saptasati which is a collection of 700 verses composed in Prakrit language by King Hāla. The text was written around first or second century AD. Gatha Saptasati mentioned Radha explicitly in its verse:

Mukhamarutena tvam krsna gorajo radhikaya apanayan |
Etasam ballavinam anyasam api gauravam harasi ||

Translation:

"O Krishna, by the puff of breath from your mouth, as you blow the dust from Radha's face, you take away the glories of other milkmaids."

Radha also appears in the Puranas namely the Padma Purana (as an avatar of Lakshmi), the Devi-Bhagavata Purana (as a form of Mahadevi), the Brahma Vaivarta Purana (as Radha-Krishna supreme deity), the Matsya Purana (as form of Devi), the Linga Purana (as form of Lakshmi), the Varaha Purana (as consort of Krishna), the Narada Purana (as goddess of love), the Skanda Purana and the Shiva Purana. The 15th and 16th century Krishnaite Bhakti poet-saints Vidyapati, Chandidas, Meera Bai, Surdas, Swami Haridas, as well as Narsinh Mehta (1350–1450), who preceded all of them, wrote about the romance of Krishna and Radha too. Chandidas in his Bengali-language Shri Krishna Kirtana, a poem of Bhakti, depicts Radha and Krishna as divine, but in human love. Though not named in the Bhagavata Purana, Visvanatha Chakravarti (c. 1626–1708) interprets an unnamed favourite gopi in the scripture as Radha. She makes appearances in Venisamhara by Bhatta Narayana (c. 800 CE), Dhvanyaloka by Anandavardhana (c. 820–890 CE) and its commentary Dhvanyalokalocana by Abhinavagupta (c. 950 – 1016 CE), Rajasekhara's (late ninth-early tenth century) Kāvyamīmāṃsā, Dashavatara-charita (1066 CE) by Kshemendra and Siddhahemasabdanusana by Hemachandra (c. 1088–1172). In most of these, Radha is depicted as someone who is deeply in love with Krishna and is grief stricken when Krishna leaves her. In contrast, Radha of the Rādhātantram is portrayed as audacious, confident, omniscient and divine personality who is in full control at all times. In Rādhātantram, Radha is not merely the consort but is treated as the independent goddess. Here, Krishna is portrayed as her disciple and Radha as his guru.

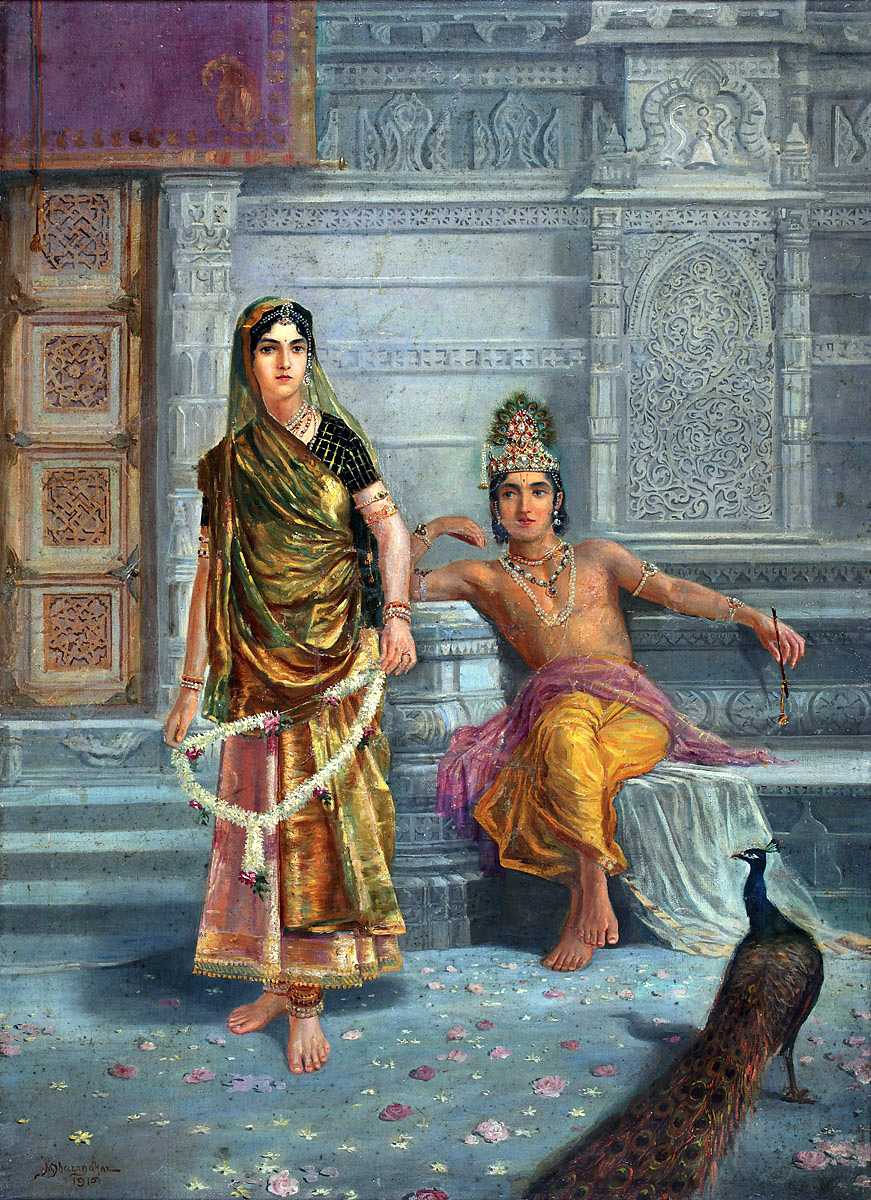
Painting of Radha with Krishna, by M. V. Dhurandhar, 1915.

Charlotte Vaudeville theorizes that Radha may have been inspired by the pairing of the goddess Ekanamsha (associated with Durga) with Jagannatha (who is identified with Krishna) of Puri in Eastern India. Though Chaitanya Mahaprabhu (15th century, the founder of Gaudiya Vaishnavism) is not known to have worshiped the deity couple of Radha-Krishna, his disciples around the Vrindavan region, affirmed Radha as the hladini shakti ("energy of bliss") of Krishna, associating her with the Primordial Divine Mother. While the poetry of Jayadeva and Vidyapati from Bengal treat Radha as Krishna's beloved, the Gaudiya poetry elevates her to a divine consort. In Western India, Vallabhacharya's Krishna-centric sampradaya Pushtimarg, Radha is revered as the Swamini of Krishna, who is worthy of devotion.

According to Jaya Chemburkar, there are at least two significant and different aspects of Radha in the literature associated with her, such as Sri Radhika namasahasram. One aspect is she is a milkmaid (gopi), another as a female deity similar to those found in the Hindu goddess traditions. She also appears in Hindu artwork as Ardhanari with Krishna, that is an iconography where half of the image is Radha and the other half is Krishna. This is found in sculpture such as those discovered in Maharashtra, and in texts such as Shiva Purana and Brahma Vaivarta Purana. In these texts, this Ardha Nari is sometimes referred to as Ardharadhavenudhara murti, and it symbolizes the complete union and inseparability of Radha and Krishna.

D.M. Wulff demonstrates through a close study of her Sanskrit and Bengali sources that Radha is both the "consort" and "conqueror" of Krishna and that "metaphysically Radha is understood as co-substantial and co-eternal with Krishna." Indeed, the more popular vernacular traditions prefer to worship the couple and often tilt the balance of power towards Radha.

Graham M. Schweig in his work "The divine feminine theology of Krishna" in context with Radha Krishna stated that, "The divine couple, Radha and Krishna, comprise the essence of godhead. Radha is therefore acknowledged by Chaitanyaite Vaishnavas to be part of very center of their theological doctrine. Sacred images of the forms of Radha Krishna, standing together side by side, are elaborately worshiped in the Indian temples. Through her image, her divine character and her amorous and passionate relations with Krishna, Radha is the constant meditation of practitioners.

According to William Archer and David Kinsley, the Radha-Krishna love story is a metaphor for a divine-human relationship, where Radha is the human devotee or soul who is frustrated with the past, obligations to social expectations, and the ideas she inherited, who then longs for real meaning, the true love, the divine (Krishna). This metaphoric Radha (soul) finds new liberation in learning more about Krishna, bonding in devotion, and with passion.

An image of Radha has inspired numerous literary works. For modern instance, the Shri Radhacharita Mahakavyam—the 1980s epic poem of Dr. Kalika Prasad Shukla that focuses on Radha's devotion to Krishna as the universal lover—"one of the rare, high-quality works in Sanskrit in the twentieth century."

=== Radha and Sita ===
The Radha-Krishna and Sita-Rama pairs represent two different personality sets, two perspectives on dharma and lifestyles, both cherished in the way of life called Hinduism. Sita is traditionally wedded: the dedicated and virtuous wife of Rama, an introspective temperate paragon of a serious, virtuous man. Radha is a power potency of Krishna, who is a playful adventurer.

Radha and Sita offer two templates within the Hindu tradition. If "Sita is a queen, aware of her social responsibilities", states Pauwels, then "Radha is exclusively focused on her romantic relationship with her lover", giving two contrasting role models from two ends of the moral universe. Yet they share common elements as well. Both face life challenges and are committed to their true love. They are both influential, adored and beloved goddesses in the Hindu culture.

In worship of Rama, Sita is represented as a dutiful and loving wife, holding a position entirely subordinate to Rama. However, in the worship of Radha Krishna, Radha is often preferred over to Krishna, and in certain traditions, her name is elevated to a higher position compared to Krishna's.

== Iconography ==
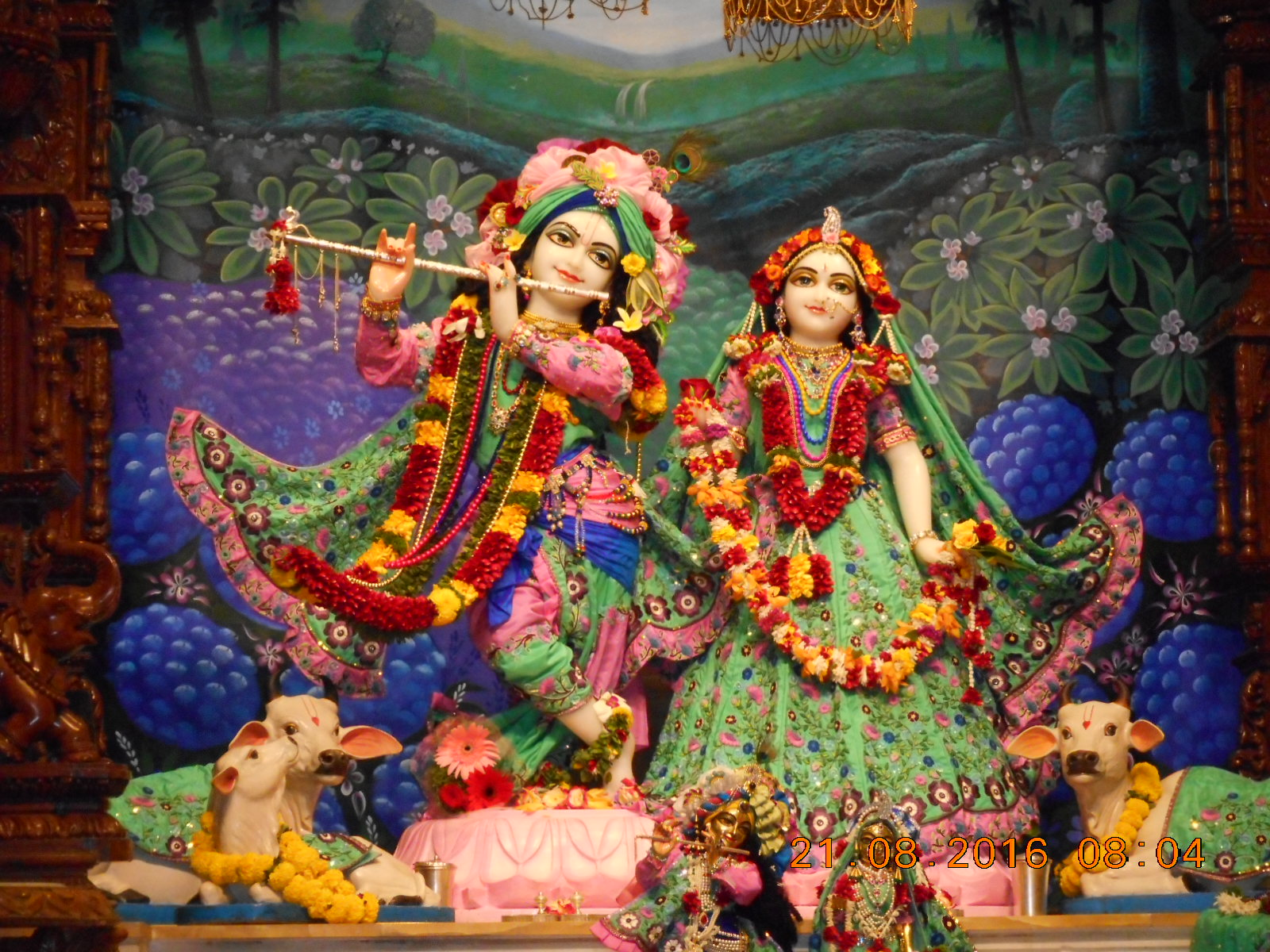
Radha Krishna Vigraha (idols) at Iskcon Temple Pune

Radha in Hinduism, is revered as the goddess of love. She is mostly depicted along with Krishna or gopis in the land of Braj. Various art forms based on Radha Krishna are majorly inspired by Gita Govinda and Rasikapriya. In Rajput paintings, Radha represents an ideal of beauty, wearing the traditional sari decorated extensively with patterns and ornamented in jewelry with lighter skin tone and emphasized facial features. In Kishangarh paintings, Radha is represented as beautifully dressed woman in ghagra choli with pearl jewelry and a dark diaphanous veil over her head. The famous Bani Thani portrait by artist Nihâl Chand was inspired by Radha's physical features which includes sharp eyebrows, lotus-like elongated eyes, thin lips and a pointed nose and chin.

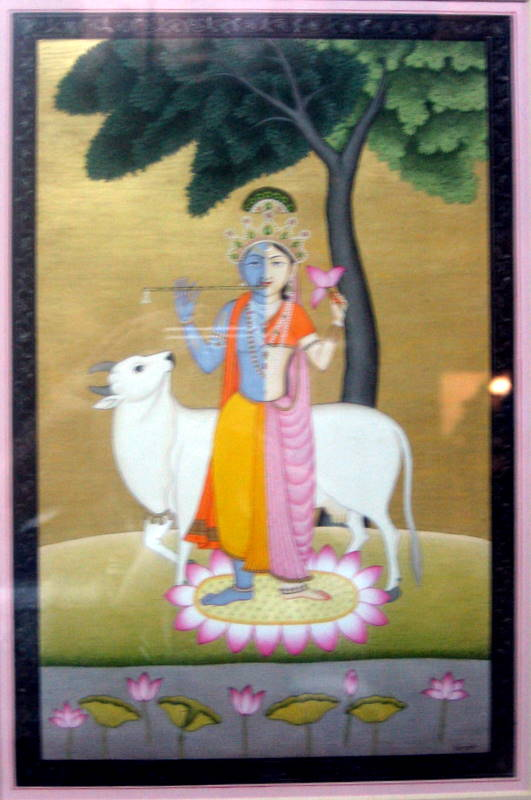
Radha Krishna ardhanarishvara form

In religious art forms, Radha also appears as Ardhanari with Krishna, that is an iconography where half of the image is Radha and the other half is Krishna forming the combined masculine and feminine form of Ardhanarishvara.

In Radha Krishna temples, Radha stands on the left of Krishna, with a garland in her hand. She is often dressed in traditional sari or ghagra-choli along with a veil. Her jewelry from top to bottom is either made of metals, pearls or flowers.

The Sanskrit scripture Brahma Vaivarta Purana describes Radha as the beautiful and youthful goddess having the molten golden complexion and wearing the garlands of gems and flowers.

== Legends ==
=== As a milkmaid ===
Radha in her human form is revered as the milkmaid (gopi) of Vrindavan who became the beloved of Krishna. One of the basic traits of Radha is her unconditional love for Krishna and her sufferings that forms the basis for Radha's exaltation as a model of devotion.

==== Birth and early life ====
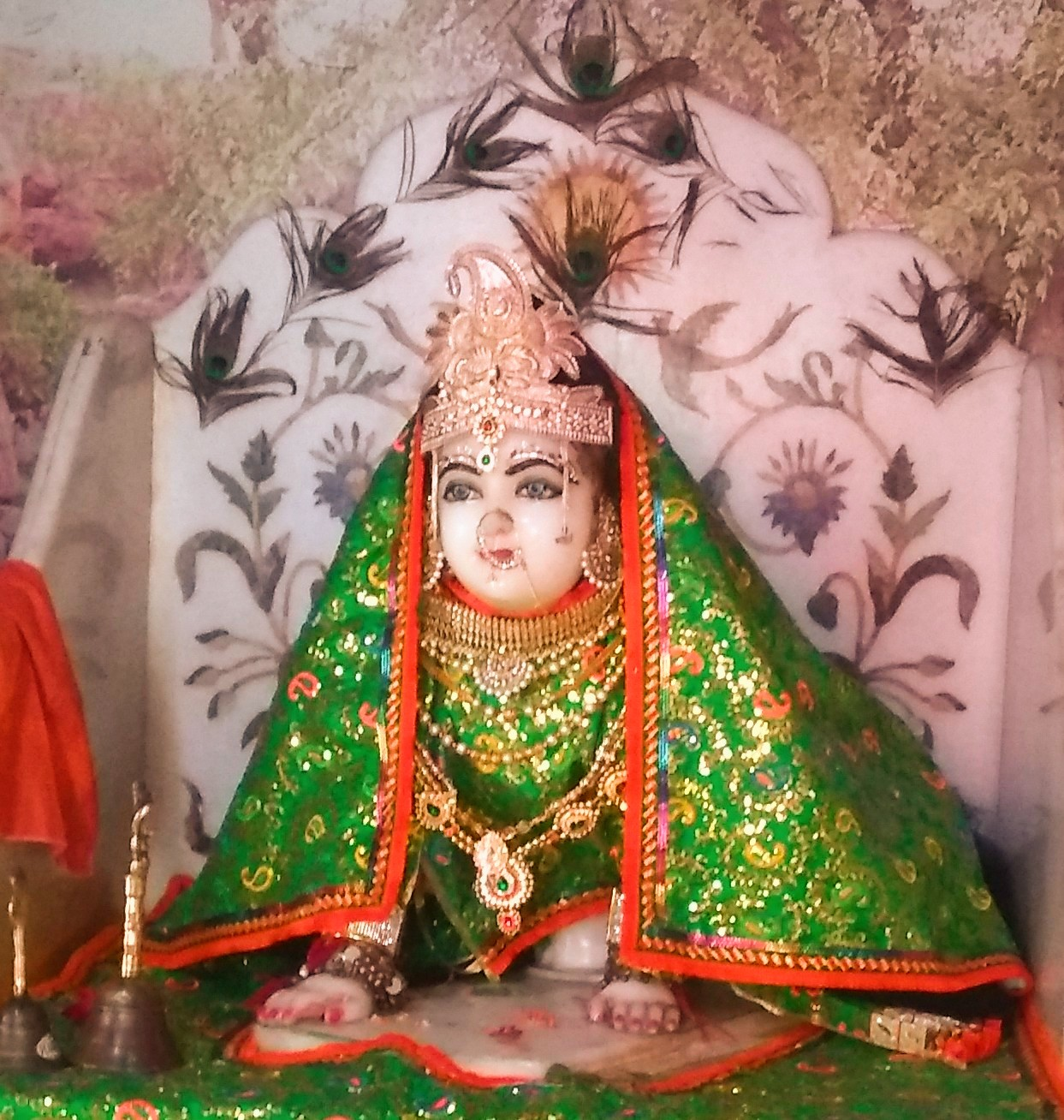
A Vigraha (idol) of Radha as a child in "Shri Radha Rani Janam Sthal Temple" at Rawal

Radha was born to Vrishbhanu, who was the Yadava ruler of Barsana and his wife Kirtida. Her birthplace is Rawal which is a small town near Gokul in Uttar pradesh, but is often said to be Barsana where she grew up. According to popular legend, Radha was discovered by Vrishbhanu on an effulgent thousand-petaled lotus floating in Yamuna river. Radha was nine months older than Krishna. She didn't open her eyes until Krishna himself in his child form appeared in front of her.

"Ashtasakhis" (translated to eight friends) are the integral part of Radha's childhood and youth. It is believed that all the Ashtasakhis are the intimate friends of Radha Krishna and also have descended from Goloka in Braj region. Out of all the eight sakhis, Lalita and Vishakha are the prominent ones. According to Chaitanya Charitamrita's Antya lila (2:6:116), Radha also received a boon from sage Durvasa in her childhood that whatever she cooks would be better than the nectar.

==== Youth ====
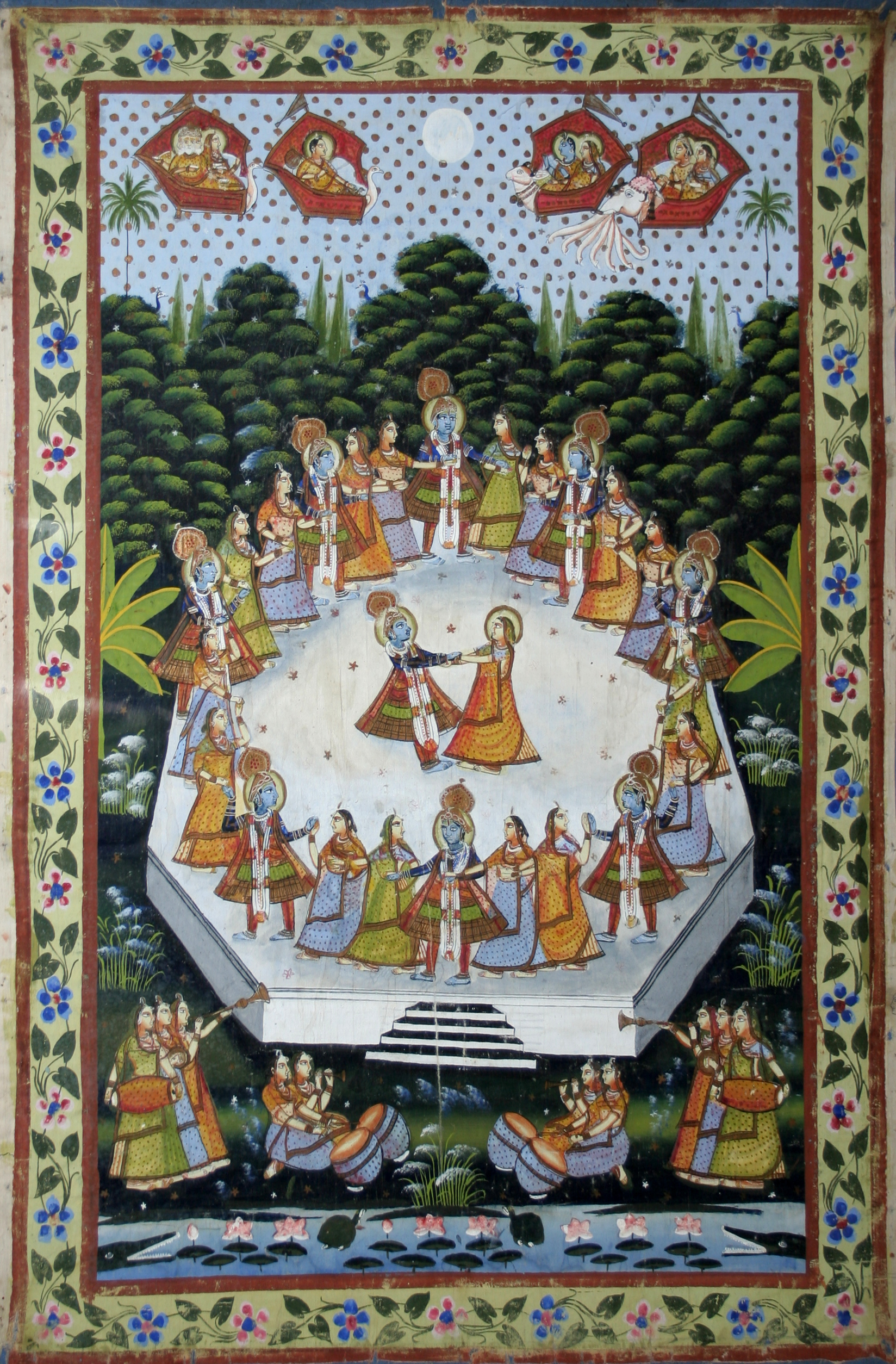
Radha Krishna's Raslila with gopis.

Stories of Radha's youth are filled with her divine pastimes with Krishna. Some of the popular pastimes of Radha Krishna include: Raslila, pastimes of Radha Kund, Gopashtami lila, Lathmar Holi, Seva Kunj lila in which Krishna did sringara of Radha, Maan lila ( A special stage in divine love in which the devotee develops so much love for God as to even attain the right of getting angry with him), Mor Kutir lila in which Krishna performed a dance lila by dressing himself as a peacock to please Radha, Gopadevi lila (Krishna took form of female to meet Radha) and Lilahava in which Radha Krishna dressed in each other clothes.

==== Relationship with Krishna ====
Radha and Krishna share two kinds of relationships, Parakiya (Love without any social limitation) and Svakiya (married relationship). (Note: Parakiya rasa depicts the relationship which is free from any kind of favors, expectations, rules and social recognition. It is only based on the selfless form of love and is often said to be the highest kind of relationship one can have with God. Svakiya rasa depicts the marital relationship which works according to the social rules and norms.) Radha asked Krishna why he can't marry her, the reply came "Marriage is a union of two souls. You and I are one soul, how can I marry myself?" Several Hindu texts allude to these circumstances.

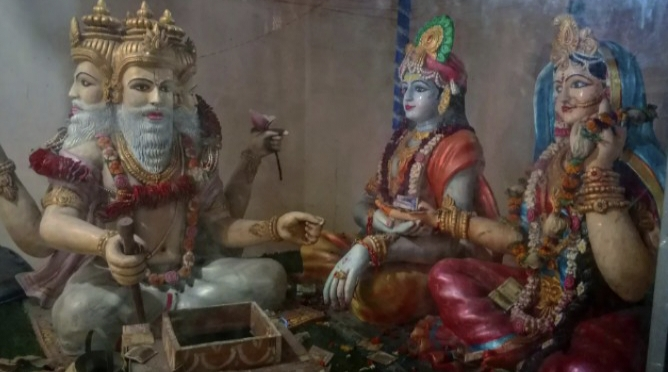
Radha Krishna's marriage is being performed by Brahma in Bhandirvan, Vrindavan

The Sanskrit texts, Brahma Vaivarta Purana and the Garga Samhita mention that Krishna secretly married Radha in the presence of Brahma in the Bhandirvan forest before leaving Vrindavan. The place where Radha Krishna's marriage was conducted is still present in the outskirts of Vrindavan, called Radha Krishna Vivah Sthali, Bhandirvan. The story mentioned in Brahma Vaivarta Purana indicates that Radha has always been Krishna's divine consort. But to give importance to Parakiya relationship (love without any social foundation) over Svakiya's (married relationship), Radha Krishna's marriage was kept hidden.

==== Life after Krishna left Vrindavan ====
According to Garga Samhita and Brahma Vaivarta Purana, Radha also left her home post Krishna's departure and went to Kadli vann (forest) leaving behind her illusionary form (also called Chaya Radha, her shadow) in Barsana. Radha with Ashtasakhi also met Uddhava in this forest who delivered them Krishna's message.

==== Reuniting with Krishna ====
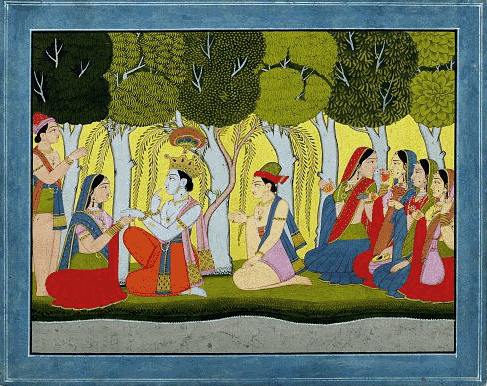
Radha and Gopis meeting Krishna in forest.

It is mentioned in Brahma Vaivarta Purana (Krishnajanma Khanda, Chapter 96) and Garga Samhita (Ashvamedha Khanda, Chapter 41) that after the curse of 100 years of separation ran out, (Note: According to Garga Samhita and Brahma Vaivarta Purana, Radha was cursed by Sridama in Goloka to bear 100 years of separation from Krishna when they descended on Earth.) Krishna revisited Braj and met Radha and gopis. After performing the divine pastimes for sometime, Krishna summoned a huge divine chariot which took the residents of Braj along with Radha and gopis back to their celestial abode Goloka where the final reunion of Radha Krishna took place.

=== As Supreme Goddess ===
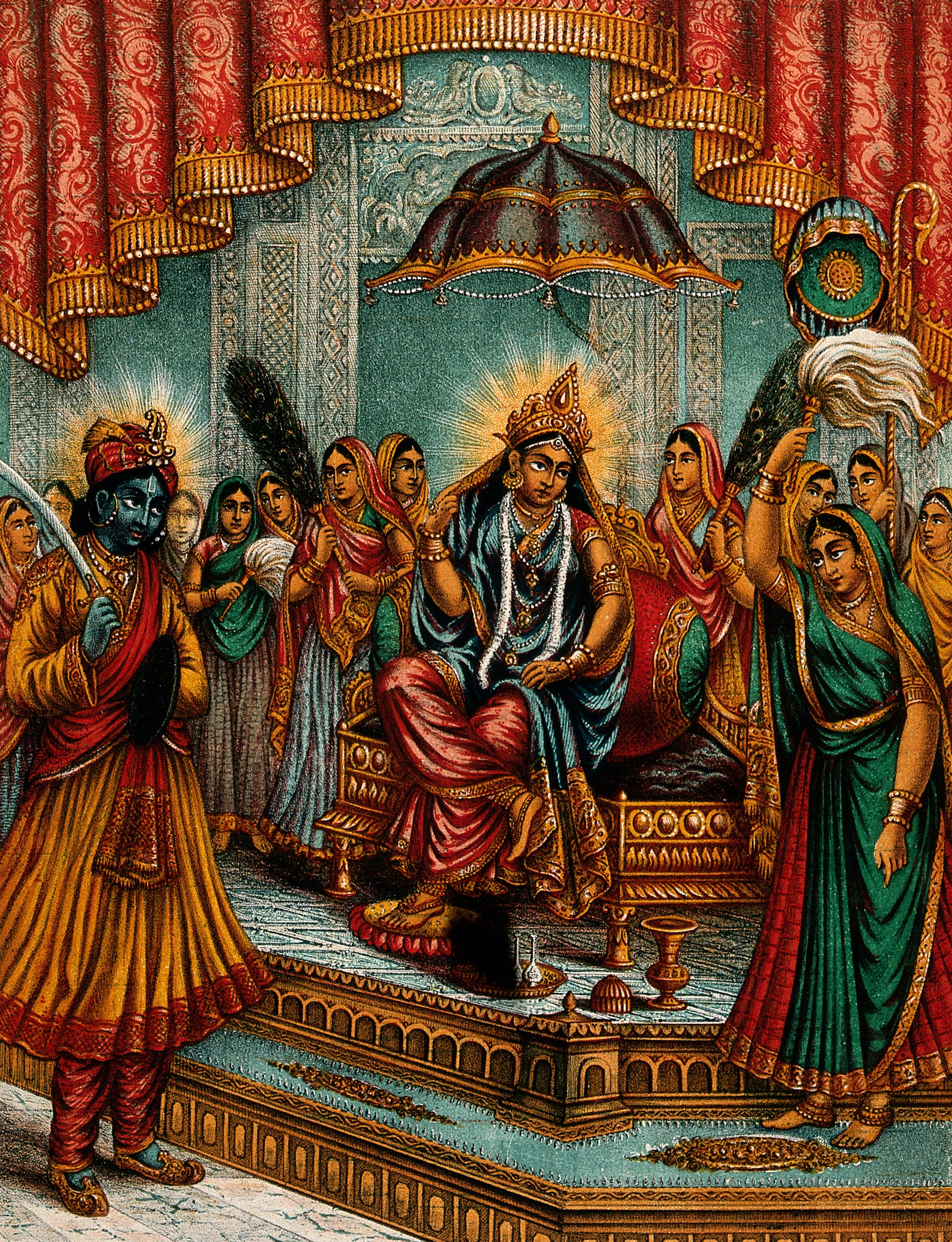
Radha depicted as Supreme goddess while Krishna humbly stands in front of her.

In Brahma Vaivarta Purana, Radha (or Rādhikā), who is inseparable from Krishna, appears as the main goddess. She is mentioned as the personification of the Mūlaprakriti, the "Root nature", that original seed from which all material forms evolved. In the company of the Purusha ("Man", "Spirit", "Universal soul") Krishna, she is said to inhabit the Goloka, which is a world of cows and cowherds far above the Vishnu's Vaikuntha. In this divine world, Krishna and Radha relate to one another in the way body relates to the soul. (4.6.216)

According to Krishnaism, Radha is the chief female deity and is associated with Krishna's maya (material energy) and prakriti (feminine energy). At highest level Goloka, Radha is said to be united with Krishna and abiding with him in the same body. The relationship between Radha Krishna is that of substance and attribute: they are as inseparable as Milk and its whiteness or Earth and its smell. This level of Radha's identity transcends her material nature as prakriti and exits in the form of pure consciousness (Narada Purana, Uttara Khana - 59.8). While Radha is identical to Krishna at this highest level, this merger of identities seems to end when she separates from him. After separation she manifest herself as the goddess Primordial prakriti (Mūlaprakriti) who is called the "Maker of Universe" or "Mother of All" (Narada Purana, Purva-Khanda, 83.10-11, 83.44, 82.214).

In Nimbarkacharya's Vedanta Kamadhenu Dashashloki (verse 6), it is clearly stated that:

Ange tu vaame vrishabhaanujaam mudaa viraajamaanaam anuruupasaubhagaam |
Sakhiisahasraih parisevitaam sadaa smarema deviim sakalestakaamadaam ||

Translation:

The left portion of the body of the Supreme Lord is Srimati Radha, seated blissfully, as beautiful as the Lord Himself; who is served by thousands of gopis: we meditate on the Supreme Goddess, the fulfiller of all desires.

In the hymnal Hita-Caurasi of Hith Harivansh Mahaprabhu, the 16th-century bhakti poet-saint, founder of Radha Vallabh Sampradaya, Radharani is exalted to the status of the only ultimate deity, while her consort Krishna is just her most intimate subordinate. As a precursor to this view can be understand Jayadeva, in whose Gita Govinda (10.9) Krishna is beneath Radha.

Radha is also considered as the personification of Krishna's love. According to doctrines attributed to Vaishnavite saint Chaitanya Mahaprabhu, It is said that, Krishna has three powers: the internal which is intelligence, the external which generates appearances and the differentiated which forms the individual soul. His chief power is that which creates dilatation of the heart or joy. This appears to be the power of love. When this love becomes settled in the heart of the devotee, it constitutes Mahabhava, or the best feeling. When love attains to the highest pitch, it constitutes itself into Radha, who is the most lovable of all and full of all qualities. She was the object of the highest love of Krishna and being idealized as love, some of the agreeable feelings of the heart are considered her ornaments.

In Narada Pancharatra Samhita, Radha is mentioned as the feminine form of Krishna. It is described that, the one single lord is represented to have become two—one a woman and the other a man. Krishna retained his form of man while the female form became Radha. Radha is said to have come out from primordial body of Krishna, forming his left side, and is eternally associated with him in his amorous sports in this world as well as the world of cows (Goloka).

Radha is often identified with the "sweet" aspect of goddess Lakshmi's essence and thus also worshiped as an avatara of Lakshmi. In Shri Daivakrita Lakshmi Strotam, Lakshmi is praised and glorified in her form of Radha

In Goloka, you are the goddess more dear to Krishna than life itself, His own Radhika.
Deep in the Vrinda forest, you are the mistress of mesmerizing rasa dance.

— Shri Daivakrita Lakshmi Strotam

According to the Garga Samhita (Canto 2, chapter 22, verses 26–29), during the rasa pastime, on the request of gopis, Radha and Krishna showed them their eight armed forms and turned into their Lakshmi Narayan forms. (2.22.26)

In Skanda Purana (Vaishnava Khand, chapter 128), Yamuna describes Radha as the soul of Krishna. She emphasis that "Radha is Krishna and Krishna is Radha" and all the queens of Krishna including Rukmini are the expansion of Radha.

== Portrayal ==
=== As Krishna's lover consort (Parakiya rasa) ===
Radha is admired as an ideal of perfect lover. In Gita Govinda, it is not certain whether Radha was married or if she was an unmarried maiden. But, the relationship between Radha Krishna was unfolded in the secrecy of Vrindavan forest hinting at the Parakiya rasa. This can be understood from the verse where Nanda, the father of Krishna, who represents social authority and ideal of dharma ordered Radha Krishna to go home as storm was approaching Vrindavan but the order was defied by the couple. The translation of first verse of Gita Govinda is as follows:

Radha, you alone must take him home. This is Nanda's command. But, Radha and Madhava (Krishna) stray to a tree in the grove by the path and on the bank of the Yamuna their secret love games prevail.

— Jayadev, Gita Govinda

In the Gita govinda, Radha stands in relation to Krishna as his consort. She is neither a wife nor a devoted rustic playmate. She is an intense, solitary, proud figure who is addressed as Sri, Candi, Manini, Bhamini and Kaamini. She is portrayed as Krishna's partner in a mature and exclusive love.

In Vidyapati's work, Radha is depicted as a young girl barely twelve years old, while Krishna is depicted slightly older than her and as an aggressive lover. In the work of poet Chandidas, Radha is depicted as a bold woman who is unafraid of social consequences. Radha abandons all social propriety in the name of her love for Krishna. Excerpts of Chandidas's work showing Radha's boldness:

Casting away all the ethics of caste, my heart dotes on Krishna day and night. The custom of the clan is far away cry, and now I know that love adheres wholly to its own laws.
I have blackened my golden skin longing for him. As the fire encircled me, my life begins to wilt. And my heart brooding eternally, parched for my dark darling, My Krishna.

— Chandidas

In loving Krishna, Radha violates the basis of caste, showing no care for the realities of social structures. Love consumed her to extent that once having fair complexion, Radha turned herself into Krishna's dark color. Chandidas used the word "fire" as synonym for Radha's love towards Krishna. The Radha of Chandidas is favored by Gaudiya Vaishnavas.

=== As Krishna's married consort (Svakiya rasa) ===
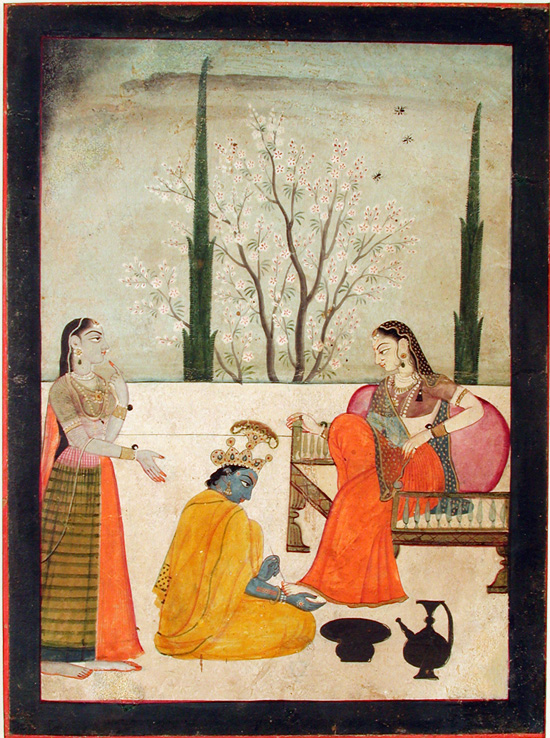
Krishna painting feet of Radha, 1760 art form based on Braj's Rasikapriya text.

Rasikapriya, a Braj text on poetics depicts Radha as the married consort of Krishna. It is a frequently illustrated text that deals with the Radha Krishna's romance and is written by one of the most prominent writers of the Riti kavya tradition, Kesavdas. Changes in the portrayal of Radha, as articulated in the Rasikapriya, have significant implications for later literary traditions. In the Riti kavya literature, especially the Rasikapriya, Radha is depicted as the archetypal heroine and is used to exemplify the ideal form of connection to Krishna. Rather than depicting her as a parakiya heroine, Kesavdas, on the whole, presents her as a svakiya heroine, the one to whom Krishna belongs wholeheartedly. If she is separated from him, it is only temporarily, for as archetypal lovers they are connected forever. The suggestion that Radha is Krishna's rightful wife is clearly articulated in the first chapter in the exemplary verse for the manifest form of union. Here, Kesavdas compares the union of Radha and Krishna with that of Sita and Rama. Kesavdas compares the union of Radha and Krishna with that of Sita and Rama:

Once Krishna sat with Radha on the same couch with pleasure, and in the mirror held, as he looked to watch the splendor of her face, his eyes filled with tears. In her reflections he saw the red gem on her forehead which seemed to glow like fire, reminding him of Sita sitting in fire, adorned, with her husband's leave.

— Kesavdas, Rasikapriya (I,22)

In this verse, Kesavdas connects Radha with Krishna as his legitimate wife not only in this lifetime but even in the previous one. Chapter 3 and verse 34 of Rasikapriya, depicted Radha as Madhya arudhayovana nayika and is described as a beautiful woman who looks like a heavenly damsel, with perfect features (forehead like the half moon, arches like a perfect bow, etc.), golden body, and a beautiful body fragrance. In chapter 3, verse 38, one attendant talks to another:

I have seen such an amazingly beautiful gopi, that I wonder if she really is a cowherdess ! Such splendor shone from her body that my eyes remained transfixed on her! No other beautiful women appeal any more; having seen her delicate walk once, I see the beauty of all three worlds. Who could be the husband of such a beauty, Kamadeva or Kalanidhi [moon]? No, Krishna himself.

— Kesavdasa, Rasikapriya (III, 38)

In chapter 3, verse 38, Radha is very specifically described as the wife of Krishna. In most of the verses, whenever she is mentioned by name, she is usually seen as a virtuous court lady with utmost beauty and charm. Her husband Krishna is said to be in control of her love. Kesavdasa in Rasikapriya mentioned that while it is common to see women devoted to their husbands but it is not as common to see a husband as Krishna who is so devoted to his wife Radha and considering her as goddess.(VII, 6) In Sanskrit scripture Brahma Vaivarta Purana, Radha and Krishna are understood to be eternally related to each other as husband and wife validating their Svakiya relationship. The celebrated poets of Radha Vallabh Sampradaya, Dhruva Dasa and Rupalji composed "Vyahulau Utsav ke Pad" or "Marriage Festival songs" which describe the eternal wedding of Radha and Krishna with praise and adulation. In the Indian state of Maharashtra, Radha is often identified as Rahi, a regional form of Radha who is worshiped as the married consort of Vithoba, a regional form of Krishna.

== Worship and festivals ==
Radha Krishna devotion

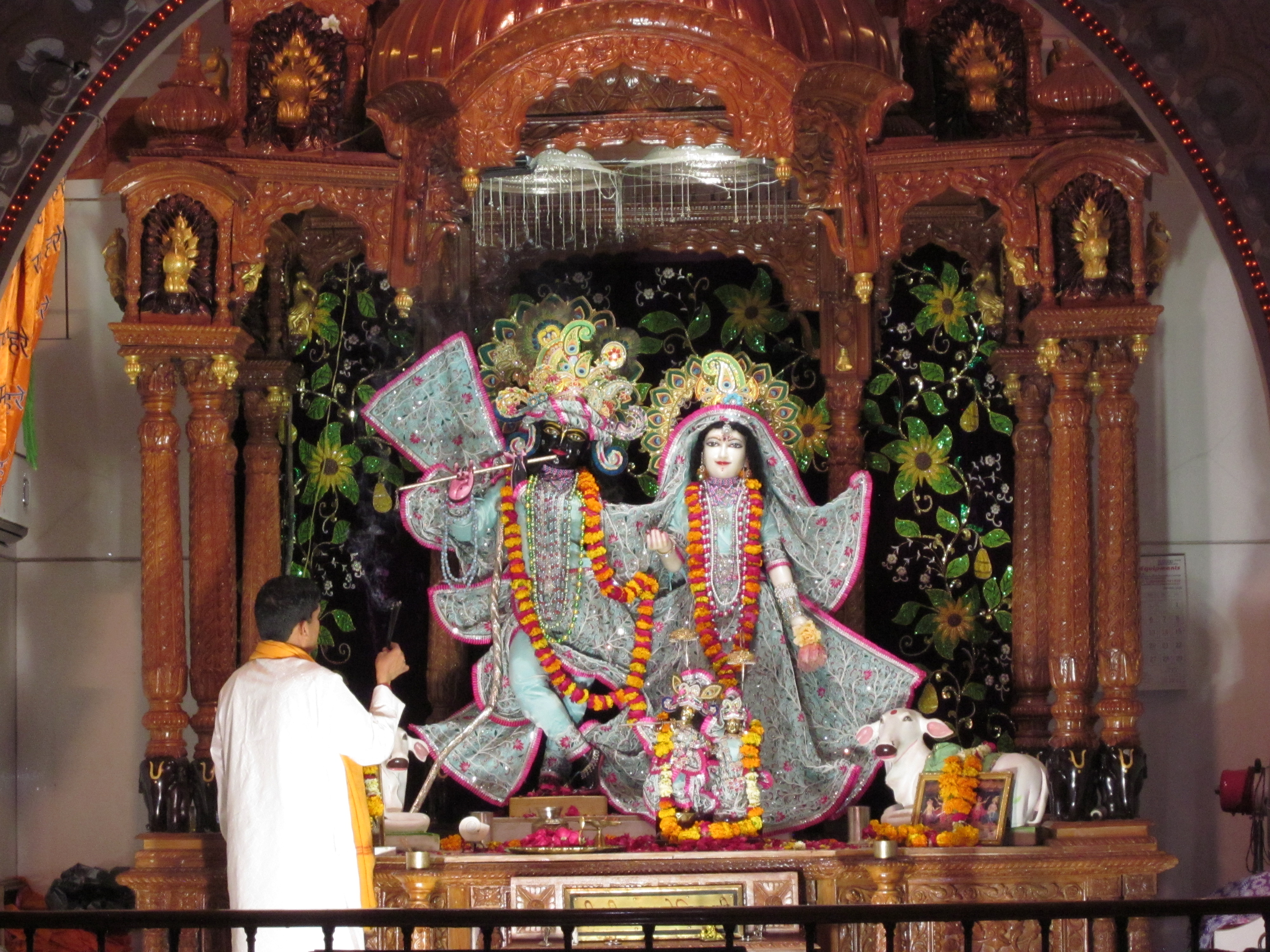
Worship of Radha Krishna

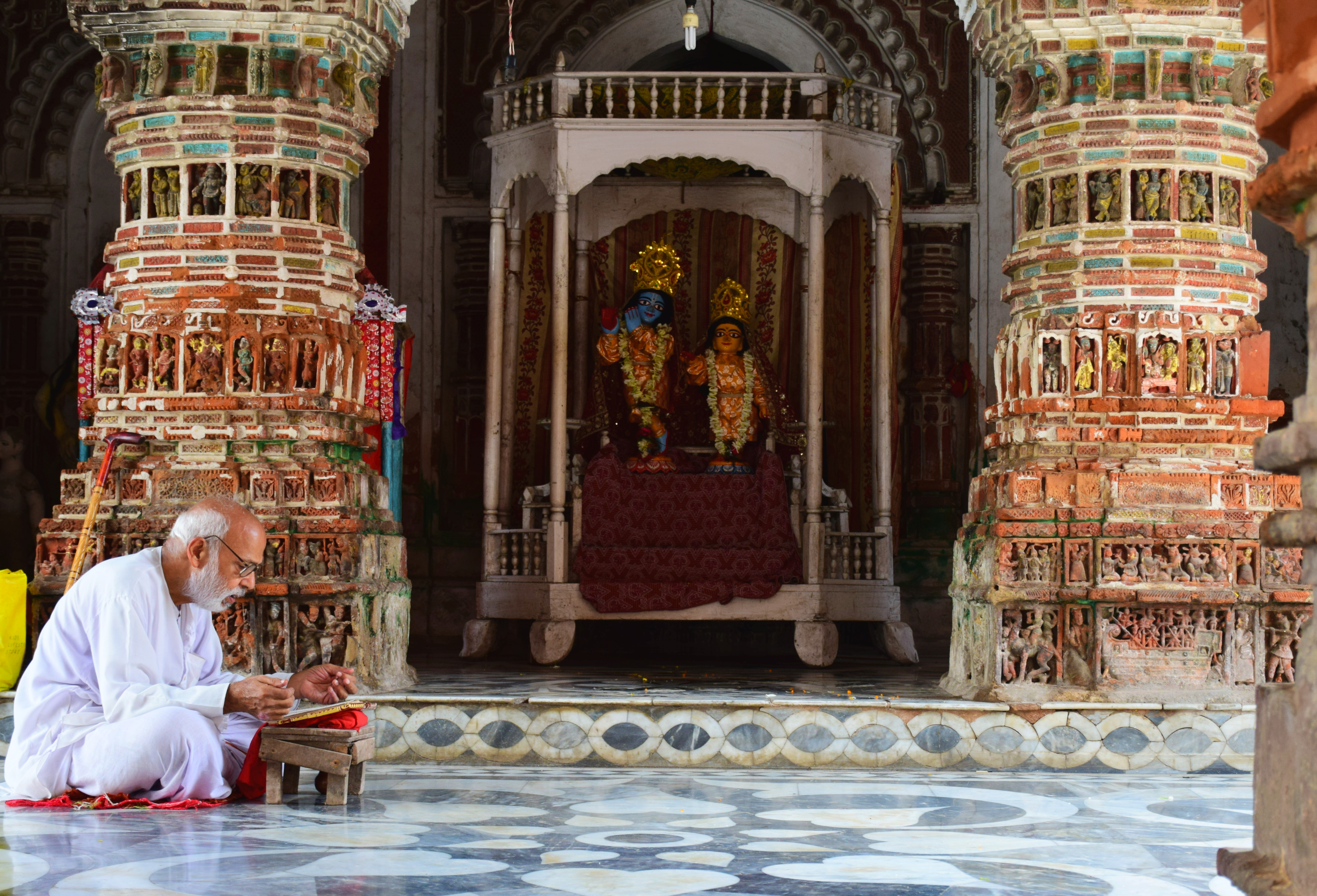
A devotee reading inside dedicated to Radha-Krishna Lalji Temple, Kalna, West Bengal

Friedhelm Hardy singles out such an offshoot of Krishnaism as Radha-centered stream Radhaism. The main representative of which is the Radha Vallabh Sampradaya (lit. 'consort of Radha'), where goddess Radha is worshipped as the supreme deity, and Krishna is in a subordinate position.

During the 18th century at Kolkata existed the Sakhībhāvakas community, whose members used to wear female dresses in order to identify themselves with the gopis, companions of Radha.

In some devotional (bhakti) Krishnaite traditions of Vaishnavism that focus on Krishna, Radha represents "the feeling of love towards Krishna". For some of the adherents of these traditions, her importance approaches or even exceeds that of Krishna. Radha is worshipped along with Krishna in Nepal and many Indian states including West Bengal, Manipur, Assam, Himachal Pradesh, Uttarakhand, Haryana, Delhi, Rajasthan, Gujarat, Uttar Pradesh, Bihar, Jharkhand, Madhya Pradesh and Odisha. Elsewhere, she is a revered deity. In Maharashtra region, Radha is worshipped in her regional form as Rahi. Radha is considered as Krishna's original shakti, the supreme goddess in both the Nimbarka Sampradaya and following the advent of Chaitanya Mahaprabhu also within the Gaudiya Vaishnava tradition. Nimbarka was the first well known Vaishnava scholar whose theology centered on goddess Radha.

Since 15th century in Bengal and Assam flourished Tantric Vaishnava-Sahajiya tradition with related to it Bauls, where Krishna is the inner divine aspect of man and Radha is the aspect of woman, what incorporated into their specific sexual Maithuna ritual.

Radha's connection to Krishna is of two types: svakiya-rasa (married relationship) and parakiya-rasa (a relationship signified with eternal mental "love"). The Gaudiya tradition focuses upon parakiya-rasa as the highest form of love, wherein Radha and Krishna share thoughts even through separation. The love the gopis feel for Krishna is also described in this esoteric manner as the highest platform of spontaneous love of God, and not of a sexual nature.

=== Hymns ===
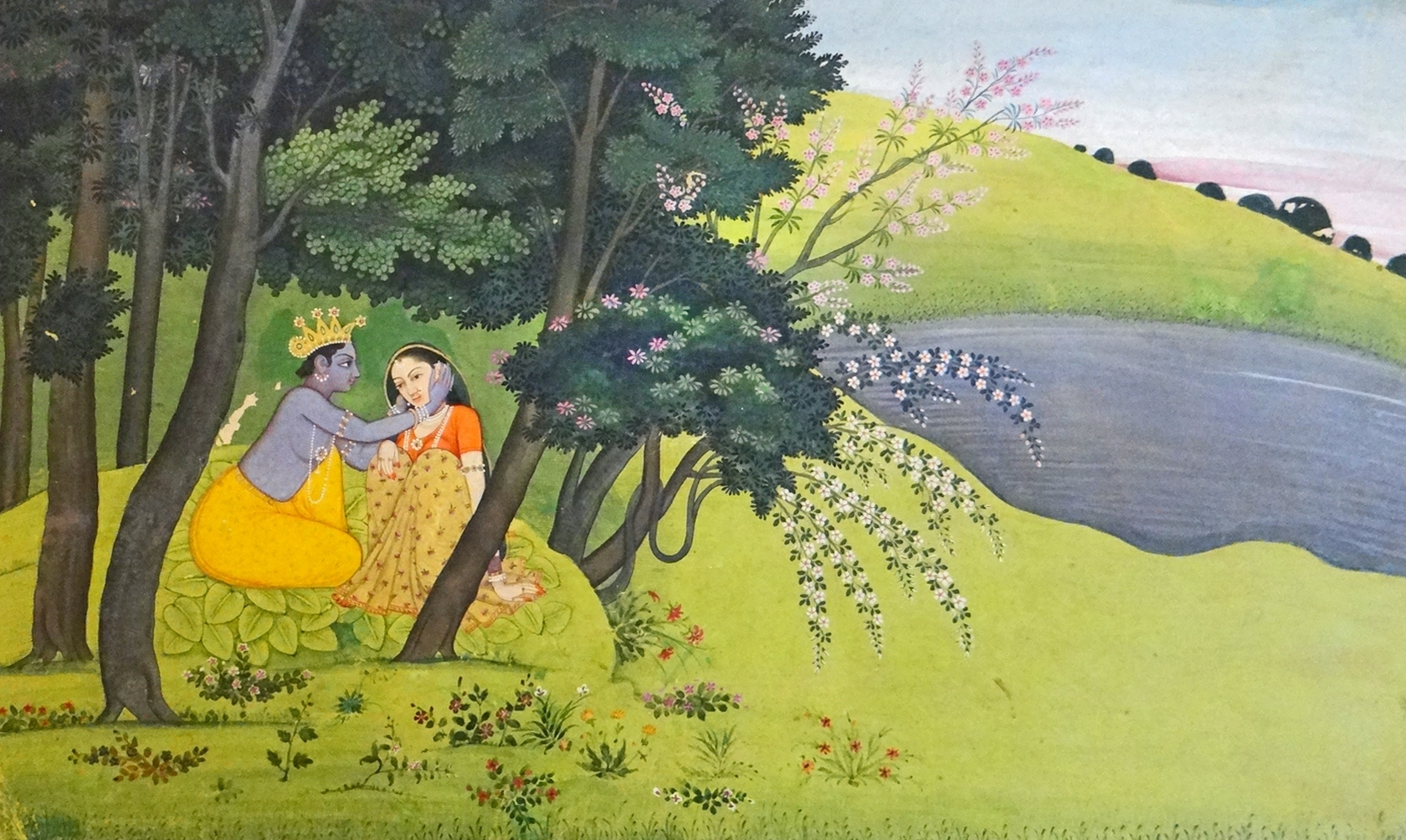
Radha Krishna painting inspired by Gita Govinda

List of prayers and hymns dedicated to Radha are:

- Gita Govinda: This 12th century work of Jayadeva is dedicated to both Radha and Krishna. Gita Govinda is still the part of temple songs of Jagannath Temple, Puri.
- Radhe Krishna: The maha-mantra of Nimbarka Sampradaya is as follows:

Rādhe Kṛṣṇa Rādhe Kṛṣṇa
Kṛṣṇa Kṛṣṇa Rādhe Rādhe
Rādhe Shyām Rādhe Shyām
Shyām Shyām Rādhe Rādhe

- Radha Gayatri Mantra: "Om Vrashbhanujaye Vidmahe, Krishnapriyaye Dhimahi, Tanno Radha Prachodayat."
- Lakshmi Gayatri Mantra: "Samuddhrtayai vidmahe Vishnunaikena dhimahi | tan no Radha prachodaydt || " (We think about her whom Vishnu himself supports, we meditate on her. Then, let Radha inspire us). The mantra is mentioned in Linga Purana (48.13) and invokes Lakshmi through Radha.
- Shri Radhika Krishnashtaka: It is also called Radhashtak. The prayer is composed of eight verses and is popular in Swaminarayan Sampradaya.
- Shri Radha Saharsnama Strotam: The prayer has more than 1000 names of Radha and is part of the Sanskrit scripture Narada Panchratra.
- Radha Kripa Kataksh Strotam: This is the most famous stotra in Vrindavana. It is written in Ūrdhvāmnāya-tantra and is believed to be spoken by Śiva to Parvati. The prayer is dedicated to Radha and has total 19 verses.
- Yugalashtakam: This prayer is dedicated to Yugal (combined) form of Radha Krishna. It is popular in Gaudiya Vaishnavism and was written by Jiva Goswami.
- Radha Chalisa: A devotional hymn in praise of Radha. The prayer has 40 verses.
- Hare Krishna Mahamantra: In this mantra, "Hare" is the vocative form of both "Hari" (Krishna) and "Hara" (Radha). The mantra is mentioned in Kali Santarana Upanishad.

Hare Kṛṣṇa Hare Kṛṣṇa
Kṛṣṇa Kṛṣṇa Hare Hare
Hare Rāma Hare Rāma
Rāma Rāma Hare Hare

- Hita-Caurasi: The eighty-four verses (hymns) in Braj Bhasha of the 16th-century poet-sant Hith Harivansh Mahaprabhu, founder of Radha Vallabh Sampradaya, in praise of Radha as the ultimate deity, the Queen, while Krishna depicted as her servant.
- Radhe Radhe: Greeting or salutation in Braj region dedicated to Radha.

=== Festivals ===
Radha is one of the major and celebrated goddess in Hinduism. Following is the list of festivals associated with her.

==== Radhashtami ====
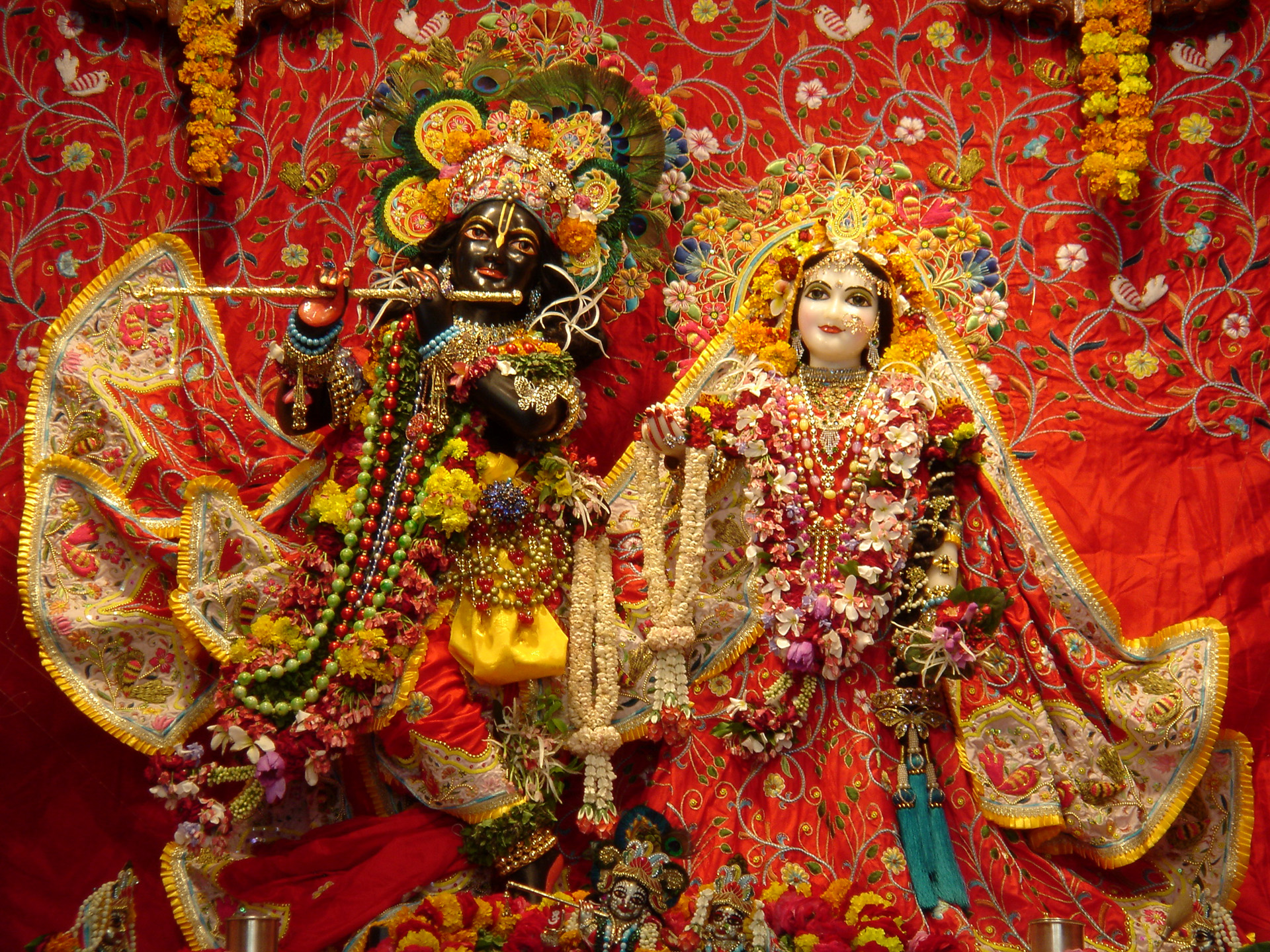
Radha Krishna on Radhashtami, ISKCON Temple, Vrindavan

Radhashtami, also called Radha Jayanti is celebrated as the appearance anniversary of Radha. In the Hindu calendar, Radhashtami is observed annually in the month of the Bhadra, 15 days after Krishna Janmashtami, the birth anniversary of Krishna, which suggests that Radha is very much an aspect of the cultural-religious faith system governing social life. The festival is celebrated with great enthusiasm and fervor especially in the Braj region. The festivities include fasting till afternoon (12 pm), abhishek and aarti of Radharani, offering her flowers, sweets and food items, singing songs, dancing and prayers dedicated to Radha. The Radha Rani Temple in Barsana host this festival in a grand manner as Basana is also considered as the birthplace of Radha. Apart from Barsana, this festival is celebrated in nearly all the temples of Vrindavan and ISKCON temples across the world as it is one of the major festival for many Vaishnavism sections.

==== Holi ====
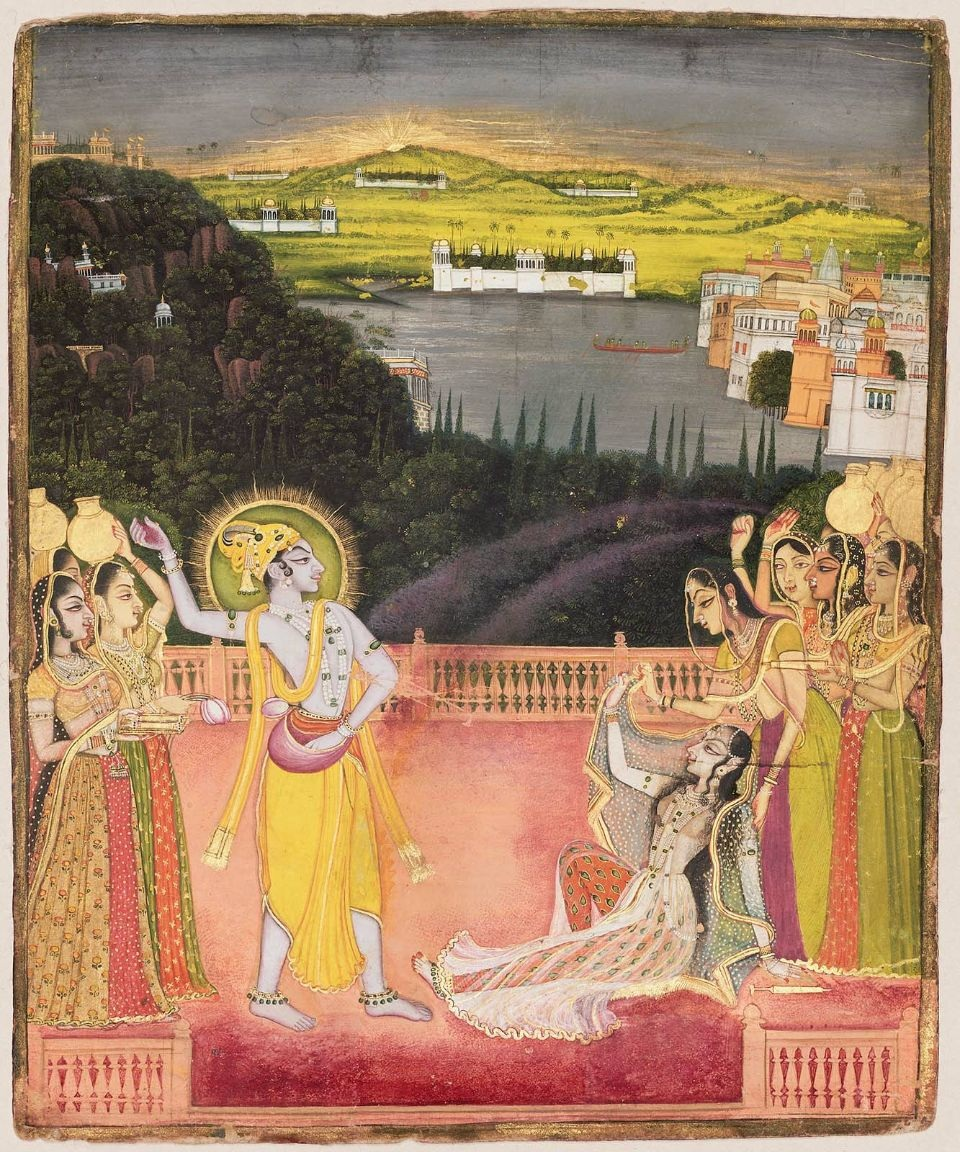
Krishna Celebrates Holi with Radha and the Gopis by Nihal Chand, Kishangarh, 1750-60

Holi, one of the major Hindu festival, also called festival of love and festival of colors also celebrates the divine and eternal love of Radha and Krishna. Mathura and Vrindavan are known for their Holi celebrations. According to popular legend associated with Radha Krishna, as a child, Krishna would cry to his mother Yashoda about Radha being fair while he had a dark complexion. His mother then advised him to smear colour of his choice on Radha's face, thus giving birth to Braj ki Holi. It is said that every year, Lord Krishna would travel from his village Nandgaon to Goddess Radha's village Barsana, where Radha and the gopis would playfully beat him with sticks. In present times, Holi celebrations in Barsana begin one week before the actual date of the festival, moving to Nandgaon the next day. In Mathura and Vrindavan, the festival is celebrated in different forms like Lathmar Holi in Barsana and Nandgaon, where sticks are used to create playful beats, to which young men and women dance; Phoolon wali Holi in Gulaal Kund near the Govardhan Hill, during which Ras Leela is performed and Holi is played with colourful flowers and Widow's Holi in Vrindavan.

==== Sharad Purnima ====
Sharad Purnima refers to the full moon of the autumn season. On this day, devotees celebrate Krishna performing a beautiful dance called "rasa lila" with Radha and the gopis—the cowherd damsels of Vrindavan. On this day, Radha Krishna in temples are dressed in white outfits and are adorned with flower garlands and glittering ornaments.

==== Kartik Purnima ====
In Vaishnavism, the occasion of Kartik Purnima is considered as the most auspicious day to worship goddess Radha. According to Brahma Vaivarta Purana, Krishna also worshiped Radha on this day. In Radha Krishna temples, sacred vow is observed throughout the Karthik month and performances of Raslila are organized to celebrate this festival.

== In Shaktism ==
In Shaktism section of Hinduism, Radha becomes an independent goddess Prakriti-Padmini, who is the form of goddess Tripura Sundari while her consort Krishna is associated with the masculine form of goddess Kali. Tantric text Radha Tantra, portrayed Radha as the Shakta Radha who is also the spiritual mentor of Krishna. In Shaktism, the Ashtasakhis of Radha Krishna are considered as the embodiment of the Ashta Siddhis which are Aṇimā, Mahima, Garima, Laghima, Prāpti, Prākāmya, Iṣiṭva, and Vaśitva.

== Influence ==
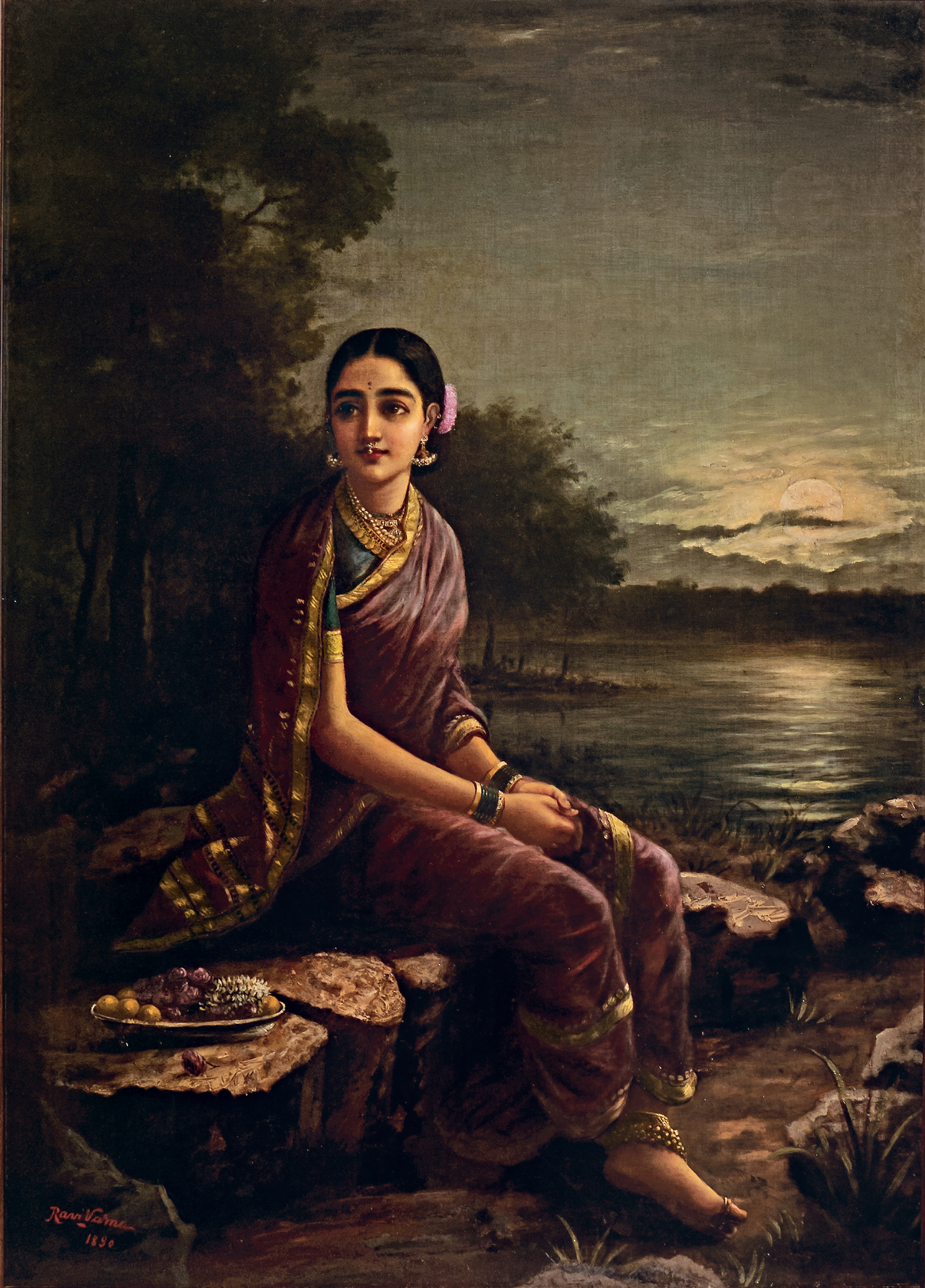
Radha's story has inspired many paintings. Above: Radha in the moonlight by Raja Ravi Varma, 1890.

=== Paintings ===
Radha and Krishna have inspired many forms of performance arts and literary works. Over the centuries, their love has been portrayed in thousands of exquisite paintings which depicts the lover in separation and union, longing and abandonment.

Patta chitra, is one of the typical regional arts of the coastal state of Orissa. In this type of painting, Krishna is depicted in blue or black color and is usually accompanied by his fiancée Radha. Rajasthani art emerged as an amalgamation of folk art with conventional and canonical ethos. Krishna and Radha have been the pivotal figures in Rajasthani miniature paintings. Their love has been delineated aesthetically in this composition. In Pahari paintings, often the nayaka (hero) is depicted as Krishna and the nayika (heroine) is depicted as Radha. The legend of Krishna and Radha and their love provided rich material to Pahari painters in general and to the artists of Garhwal in particular. The central theme of Kangra painting is love inspired by Rasikapriya, popular poetic work of Keshavdasa. A closely related theme of this art is lover looking at his beloved who is unaware of his presence. Thus, Krishna is shown watching Radha who is unaware of his presence. In Radha and Krishna, Kangra artists discovered highest model of loving couple. The Radha-Krishna theme also served their devotional purpose and provided an inherent symbolism. Madhubani paintings are charismatic art of Bihar. Madhubani paintings are mostly based on religion and mythology. In the paintings, Hindu Gods like Radha-Krishna and Shiva-Parvati are in center. Krishna and Radha are one of the favorite subject in Rajput paintings because they portrayed a theme that symbolized the desire of the soul to be united by god. In Rajput paintings, Radha is always dressed in more elegant way. She was adorned with ornaments and is often depicted holding a white garland when enthroned next to Krishna. The Chamba paintings of Himachal Pradesh and Punjab often depicts romantic ambiances of rainy season with Radha Krishna as the lead couple.

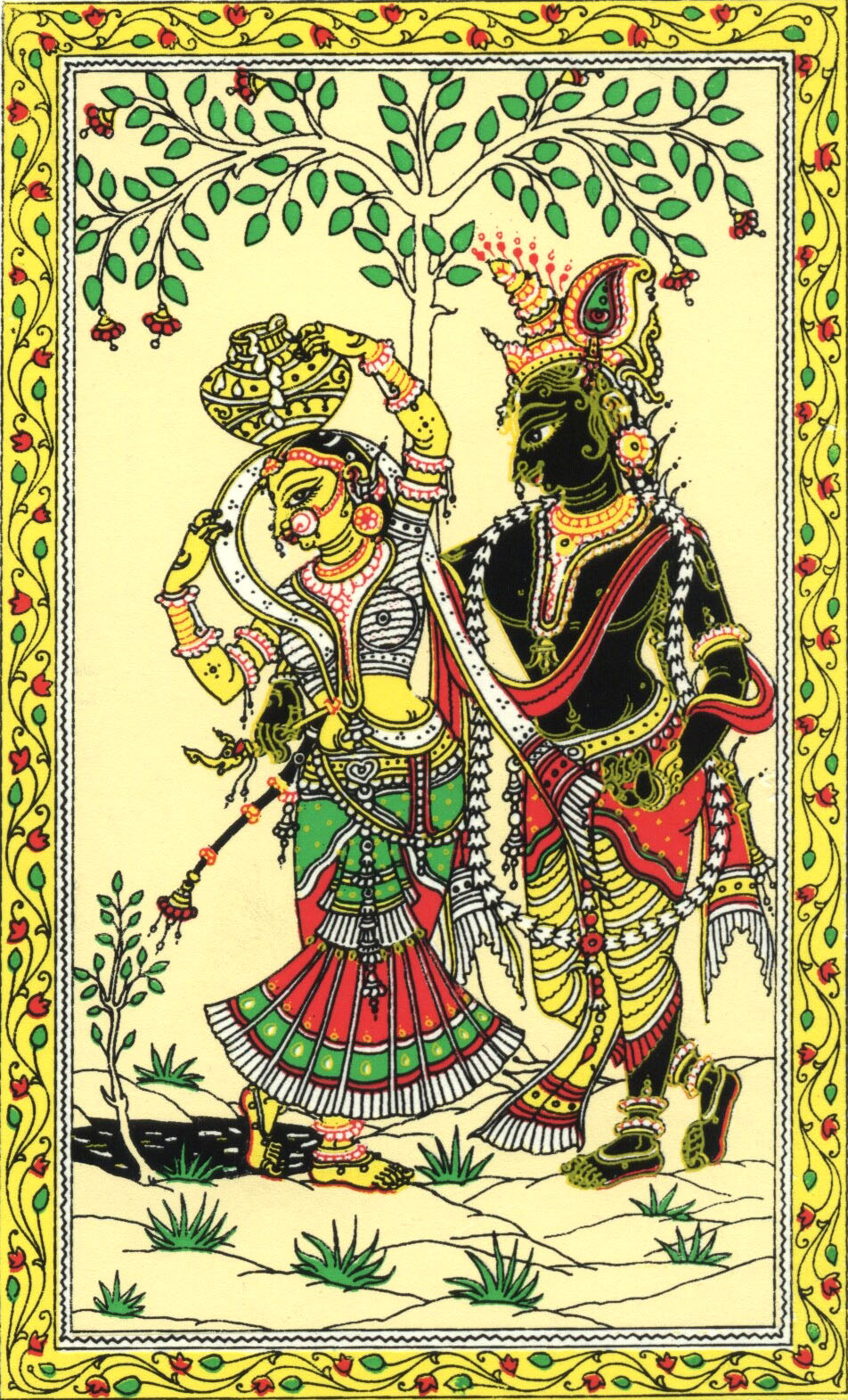
Patta Chitra painting depicting love story of Radha and Krishna.

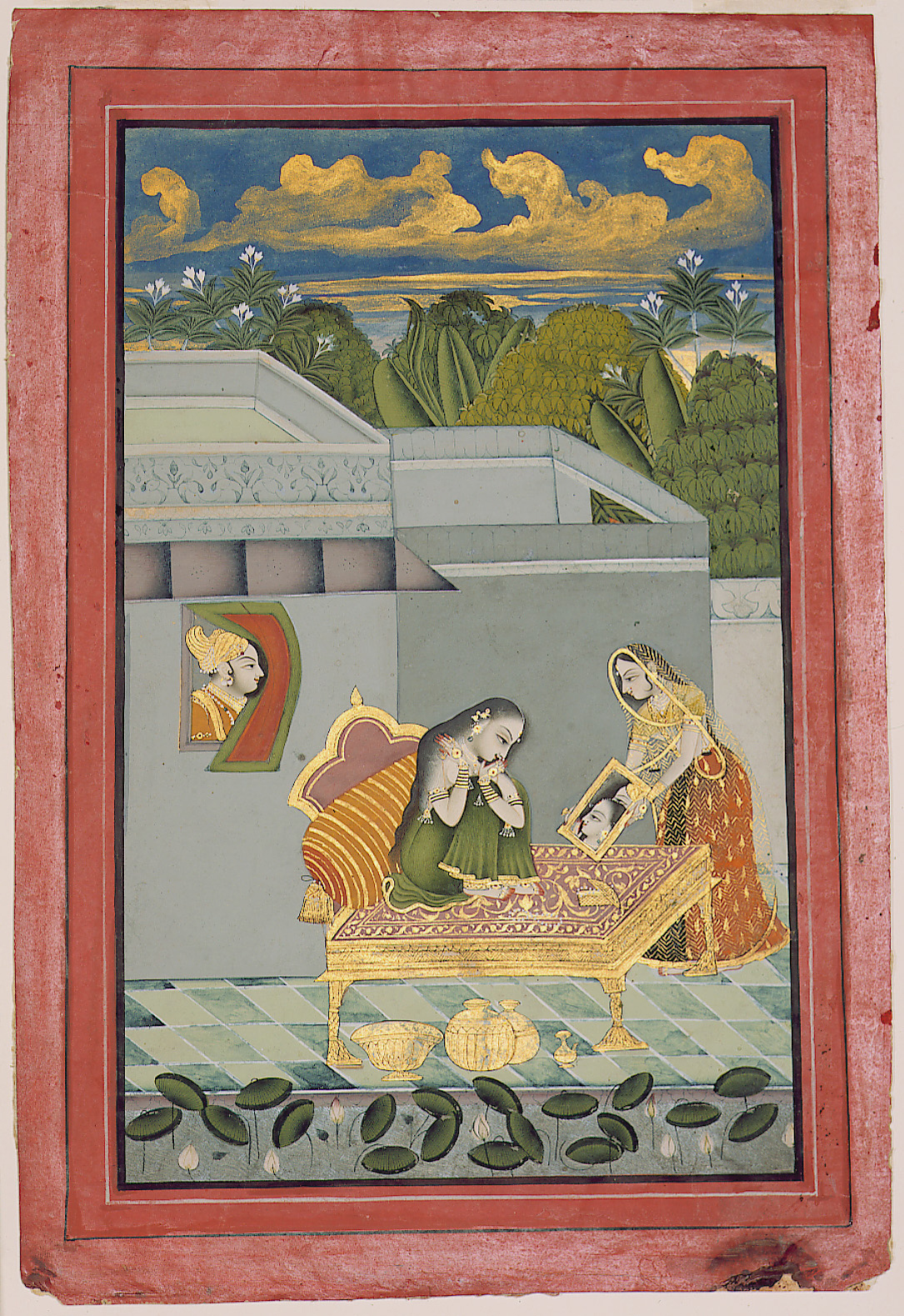
Rajasthani Painting with a love theme where Radha is getting ready and Krishna admires her silently.

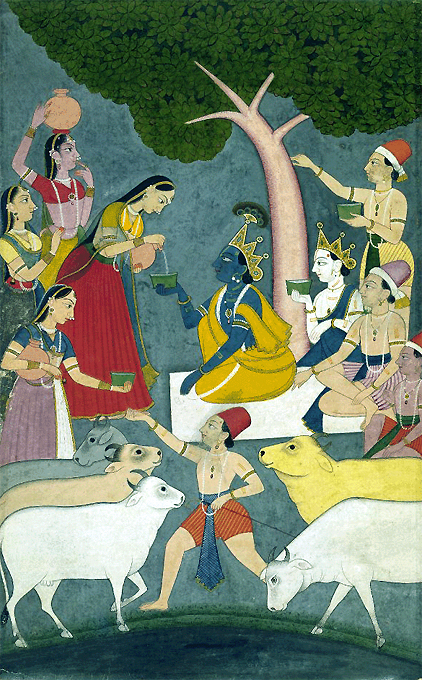
Pahari painting of Radha offering bowl of curd to Krishna.

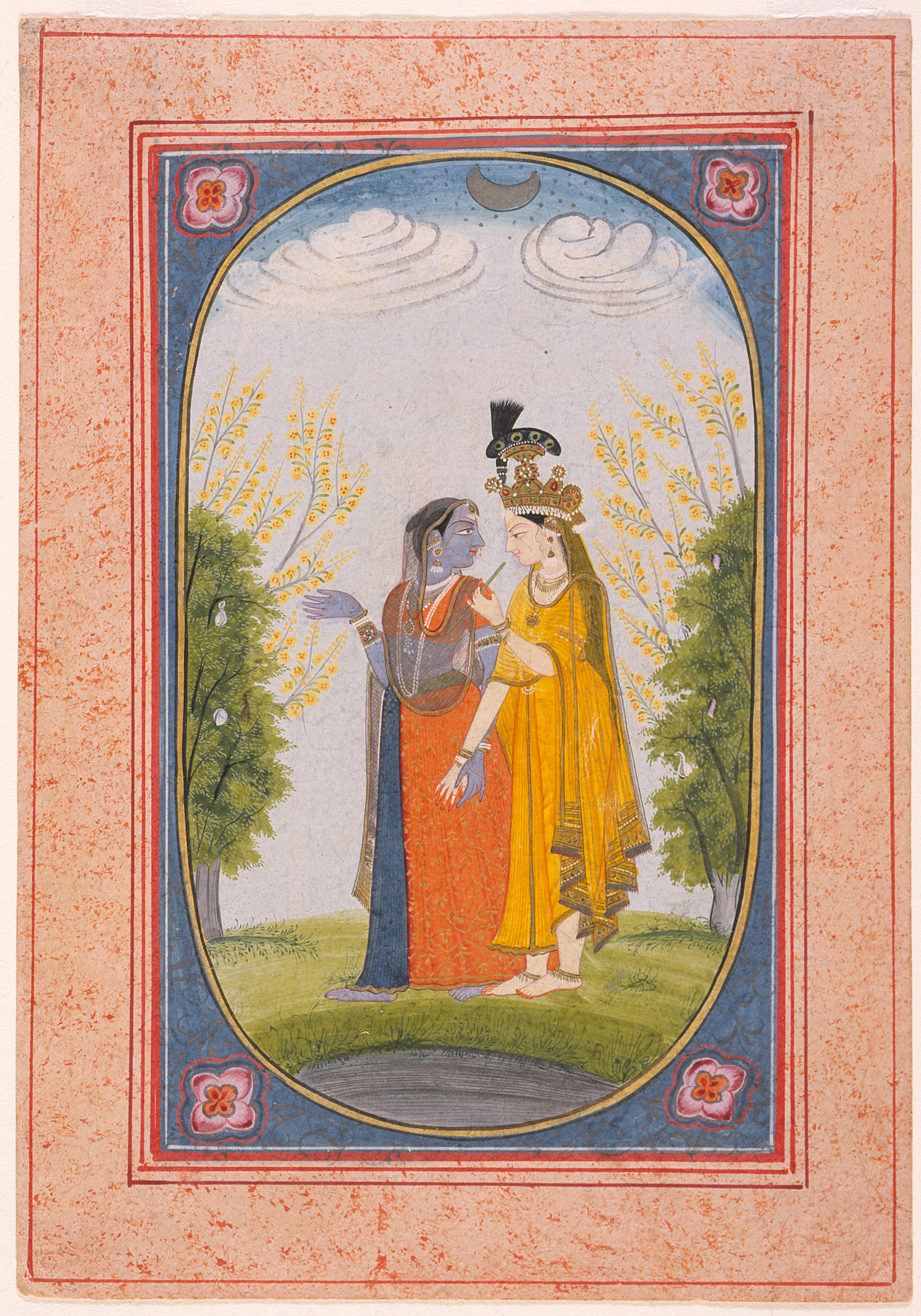
Kangra painting, Radha dressed as Krishna and Krishna dressed as Radha.

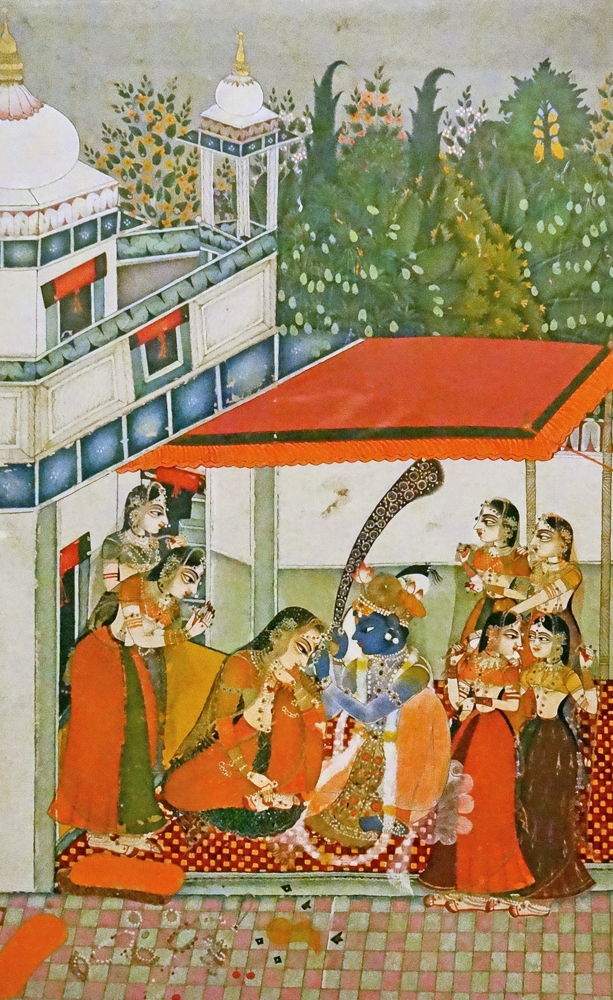
Rajput painting (1760), Radha Krishna with gopis.

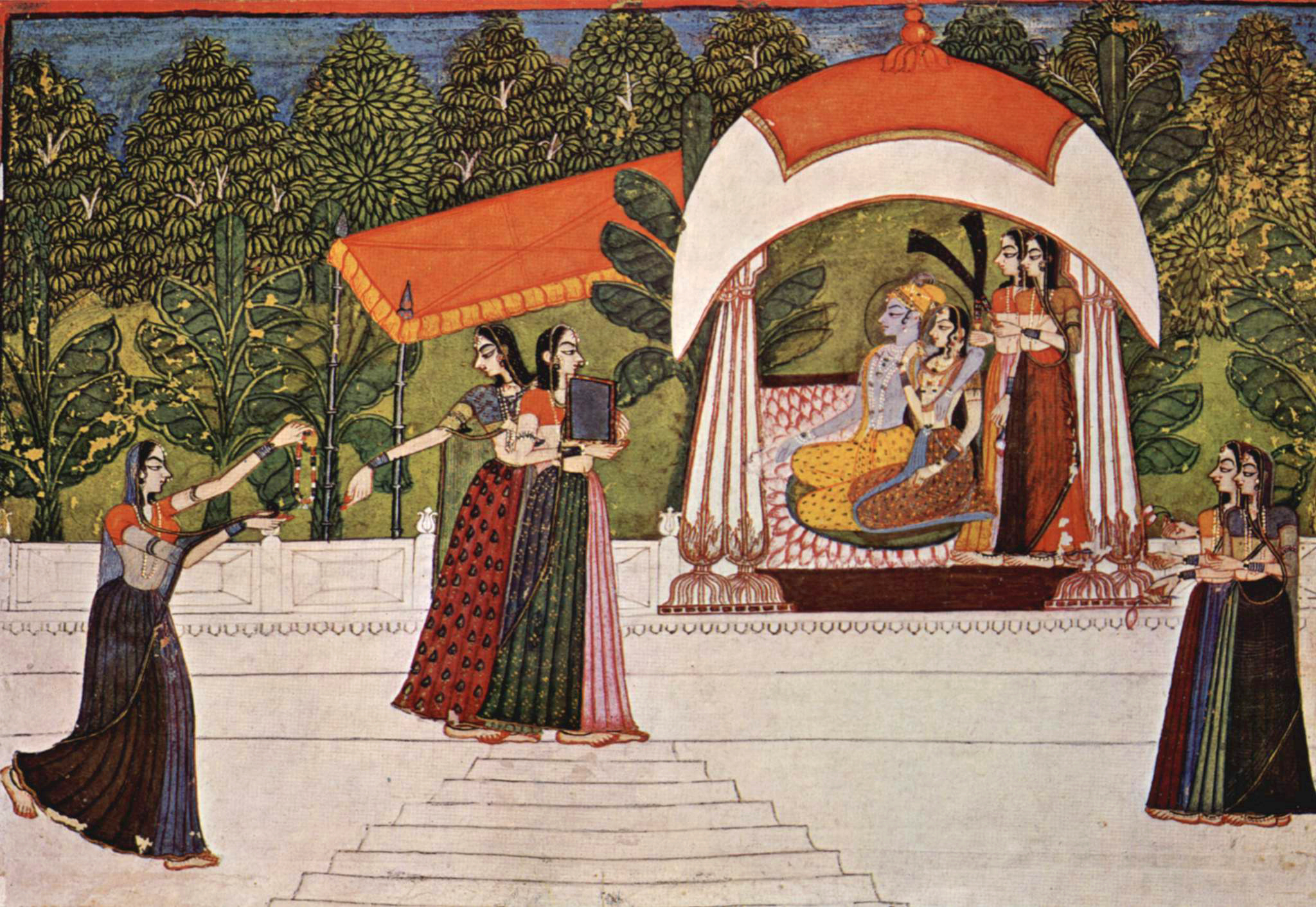
Kishangarh painting, Radha Krishna in pavilion.

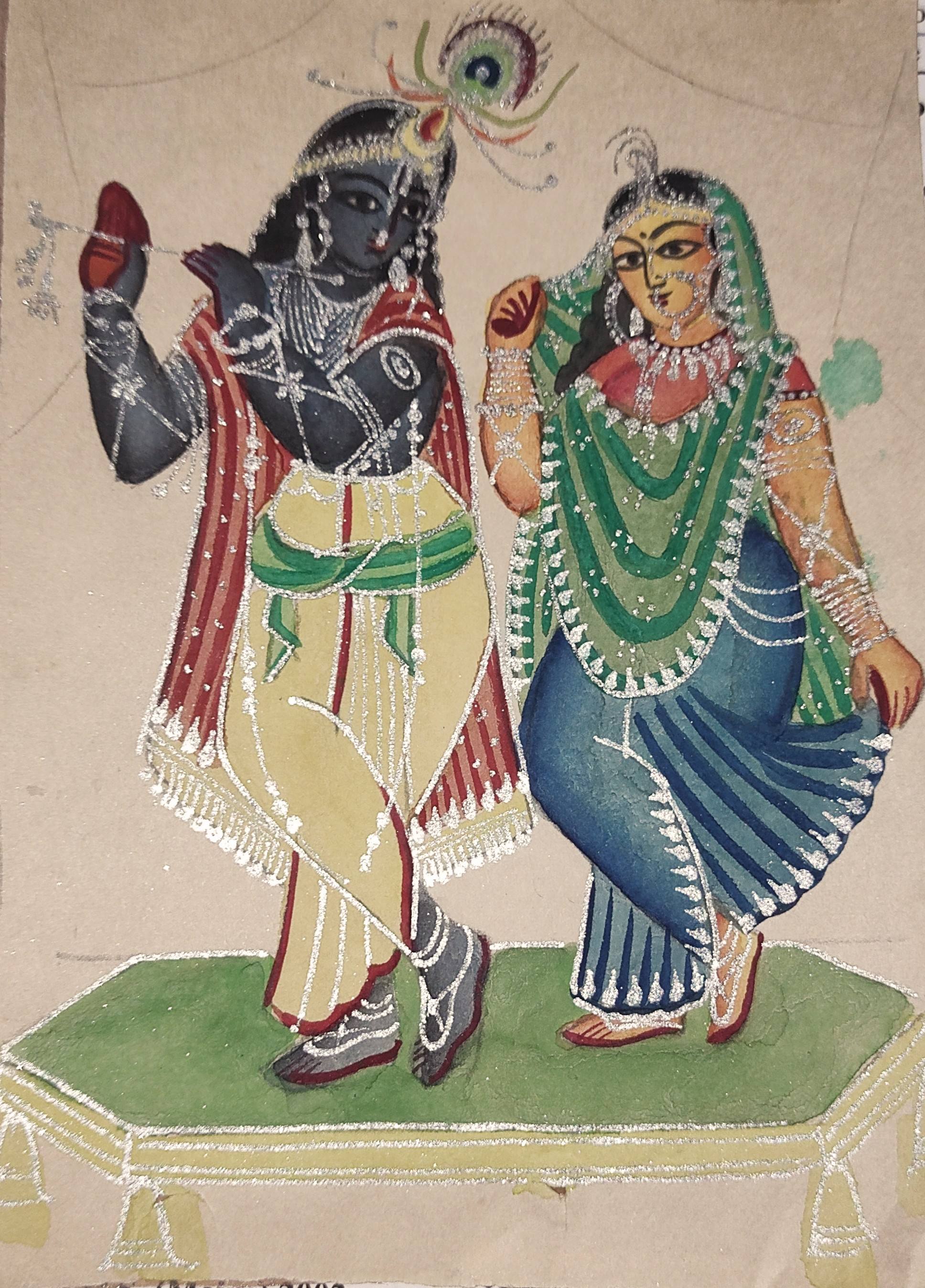
Radha- Krishna, Kalighat Painting

=== Dance forms ===
The most famous Indian classical dance Manipuri Raas Leela was first introduced by King Bhagyachandra around 1779. Inspired by Radha Krishna's raslila, the king introduced three forms of rasa dance—Maha rasa, Kunj rasa and Basant rasa. Later two more forms of rasa—Nitya rasa and Deba rasa was added by successive kings in the art and culture of Manipur. In these dance forms, the dancers portray the role of Radha, Krishna and gopis. The dance forms are still prevalent in the state of Manipur and are performed on stage as well as on the auspicious occasions like Kartik Purnima and Sharad Purnima (full moon nights).

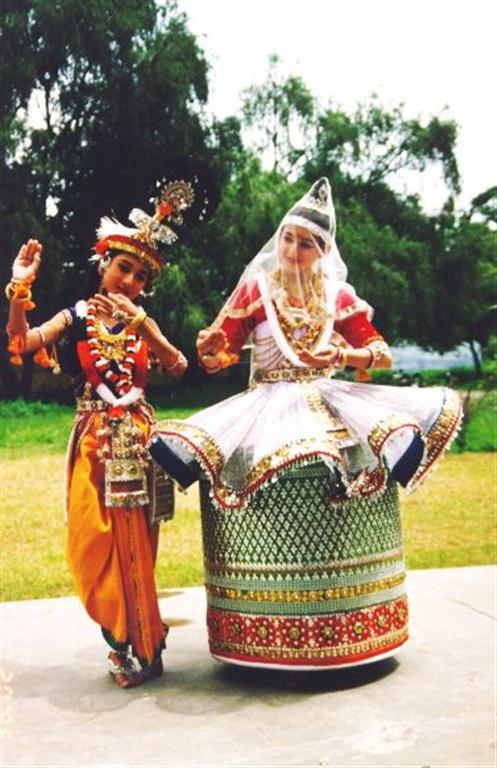
Artists depicting Radha Krishna's love story through Manipuri classical dance Raslila.

Another Indian classical dance form, Kathakali was also influenced by Vaishnavism and Radha Krishna based Gita Govinda tradition which along with other factors contributed in the evolution of this dance form. The predominant theme of North Indian Kathak dancing lies in the fleeting appearances and longer stories of Radha and Krishna. The sacred love of Krishna and his beloved Radha, are woven into all aspects of the Kathak dance and is clearly visible during the discussions of the music, costumes and finally the role of the Kathak dancer.

Ashtapadis of Gita Govinda are also enacted in contemporary classical Odissi dance form. This dance form was originated in the temples. It is centered on the celestial love of Krishna and Radha. At one time, it was performed by the Devadasis but now it has spread out to the homes and cultural institutions.

=== Music ===
Rasiya is a popular genre of Indian folk music from Braj region, Uttar Pradesh. It is commonly played and performed during the festivities in the villages and temples of Braj area. The traditional songs of Rasiya are based on the divine portrayal and love of Radha and Krishna. They are frequently written from the female perspective of Radha and portray Krishna and his flirtation with her.

=== Culture ===
The residents of Braj region still greet each other with salutations like "Radhe Radhe", "Jai Shri Radhe" and "Radhe Shyam", directing their mind to Radha and ultimate relationship she shares with Krishna. The image of Krishna rarely appears without Radha by his side in the temples of Vrindavan. It is not the Krishna who is worshiped, but Radha and Krishna together are worshiped.

In culture of Odisha, Krishna is the cultural hero and his form Jagannath, is the symbol of Oriya pride. His consort Radha is celebrated as the energy of Krishna and symbolically the energy of the cosmos. She is considered as the power of joy, the hladini shakti of Krishna and is often identified with both Durga and Mahakali, the bright and dark forms of the cosmic energy. Krishna and Radha have entered the Oriya psyche and have inspired the mythic imagination of the Oriya poets in a big way. For the conscious and the informed, Krishna and Radha are the Universe and its harmony, the Energy and its joyful articulation, the cosmic dance and its rhythmic balance.

In Indian culture, Radha serve as an exemplary model of female-neutral subjectivity for all persons—an active, non-substantial, shared and strong self that rationally embrace their (religious) passions.

=== In popular culture ===
==== Films ====
- In the 1933 Bengali film Radha Krishna, Radha was portrayed by Duniyabala.
- In the 1938 Marathi film Gopal Krishna, Radha was portrayed by Shanta Apte.
- In the 1971 Hindi film Shri Krishna Leela, Radha was portrayed by Hina.
- In the 1979 Hindi film Gopal Krishna, Radha was portrayed by Zarina Wahab.
- In the 2012 Hindi animated film Krishna Aur Kans, Radha was voiced by Rajshree Nath.

==== Television ====
- In B. R. Chopra's 1988 series Mahabharat, Radha was portrayed by Parijat.
- In Ramanand Sagar's 1993 series Shri Krishna, Radha was portrayed by Reshma Modi and Shweta Rastogi.
- In the 2008 series Jai Shri Krishna, Radha was portrayed by Kritika Sharma and Virti Vaghani.
- In the 2008 series Kahaani Hamaaray Mahaabhaarat Ki, Radha was portrayed by Puja Banerjee.
- In the 2013 series Mahabharat, Radha was portrayed by Ketki Kadam.
- In the 2016 series Baal Krishna, Radha was portrayed by Gracy Goswami.
- In the 2017 series Vithu Mauli, Radha was portrayed by Pooja Katurde.
- In the 2018 series RadhaKrishn, Radha was portrayed by Mallika Singh and Shivya Pathania.
- In the 2019 series Dwarkadheesh Bhagwan Shree Krishn – Sarvkala Sampann, Radha was portrayed by Chahat Pandey.
- In the 2019 series Paramavatar Shri Krishna, Radha was portrayed by Mahi Soni.
- In the 2019 series Shrimad Bhagwat Mahapuran, Radha was portrayed by Shiny Doshi.
- In the 2021 series Jai Kanhaiya Lal Ki, Radha was portrayed by Kiara Singh.
- In the 2022 series Brij Ke Gopal, Radha was portrayed by Manul Chudasama.
- In the 2024 series Lakshmi Narayan – Sukh Samarthya Santulan, Radha was portrayed by Shivya Pathania

== Regional forms ==
- Rahi - Rahi is the regional form of Radha, worshiped in the Indian state of Maharashtra as the consort of Vithoba, the regional form of Krishna.
- Niladevi - In South India, Niladevi or Nappinai, the consort of Vishnu, is sometimes regarded as the southern counterpart of Radha, the consort of Krishna.

== Temples ==
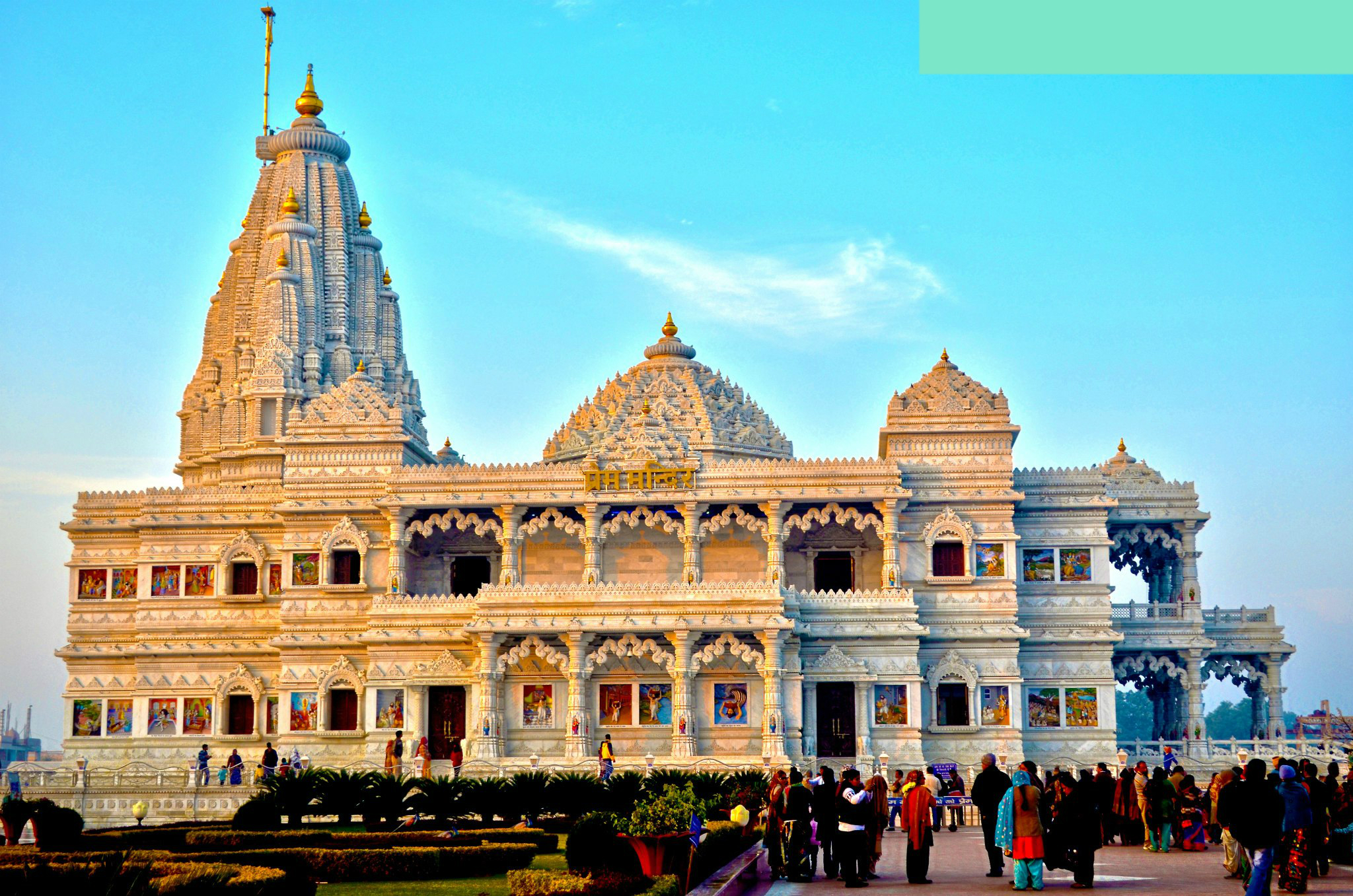
Radha-Krishna Prem Mandir (Love Temple) in Vrindavan, Uttar Pradesh

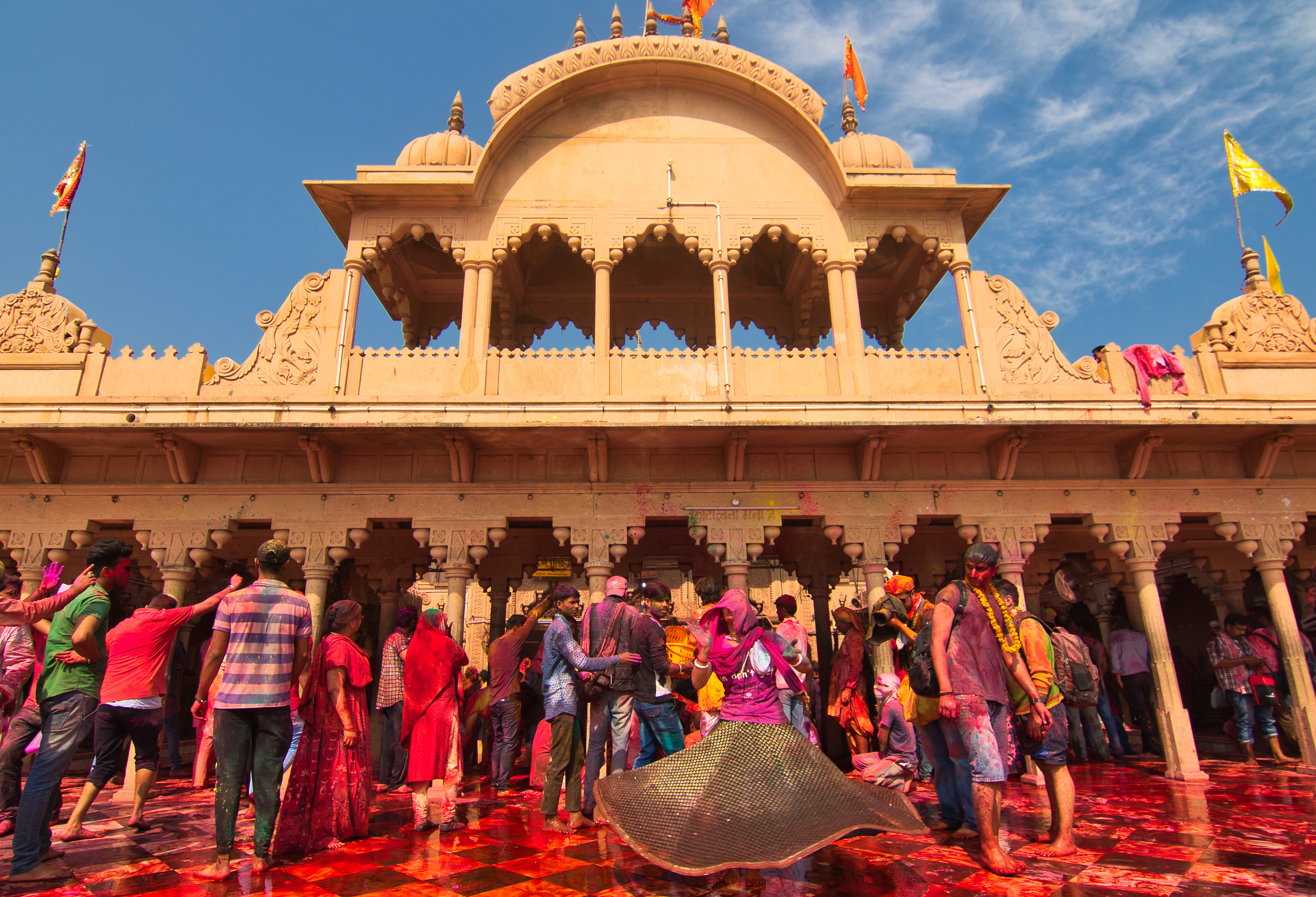
Radha Rani Temple, Barsana

Radha and Krishna are the focus of temples in the Chaitanya Mahaprabhu, Vallabhacharya, Chandidas, and other traditions of Vaishnavism. Radha is typically shown standing immediately next to Krishna. Some of the important Radha Krishna temples are:

- Barsana and Vrindavan in Mathura District, Northern India contain many temples dedicated to both Radha and Krishna.
- Vrindavan: Bankey Bihari Temple, Shri Radha Damodar Temple, Krishna Balram Temple (Iskcon Vrindavan), Shri Radha Gokulananda Temple, Shri Radha Gopinath Temple, Radha Raman Temple, Shahji Temple, Nidhivan, Radha Kund, Kusum Sarovar, Seva kunj Temple, Pagal Baba Temple, Prem Mandir, Shri Radha Madan Mohan Temple, Shri Ashtsakhi Temple, Vrindavan Chandrodaya Mandir, Shri Radha ShyamSundar ji Temple, Shri Jugal Kishore Temple, Shri Radha Govind Dev ji Temple, Priyakant ju Temple and Shri Radha Vallabh Temple.
- Mathura: Shri Krishna Janamasthan Temple, Shri Dwarkadhish Temple.
- Barsana: Shri Radha Rani Temple (Shreeji Temple), Rangeeli Mahal (Kirti temple), Maan temple (Maan Garh temple).
- Bhandirvan: Shri Radha Krishna Vivah Sthali.
- Rest of India: Shri Radha Govind Dev ji temple and Shri Radha Gopinath Ji Temple in Jaipur, Murlidhar Krishna temple in Naggar, Shri Govindajee temple in Imphal, Madan Mohan temple in Karauli, Mayapur Chandrodaya Mandir in Nadia, Swaminarayan temple Gadhada, Swaminarayan temple Vadtal, Swaminarayan Temple Bhuj, Swaminarayan Temple Dholera, Swaminarayan Temple Mumbai, Iskcon Bangalore, Iskcon Chennai, Radha Damodar temple in Junagadh, Bhakti Mandir Mangarh, Iskcon temple Patna, Radha Krishna temple, Baroh in Kangra, Hare Krishna Golden Temple in Hyderabad, Temples in Bishnupur including Radha Madhab Temple, Radha Shyam Temple, Rasmancha, Shyam Ray Temple and Lalji Temple, Sri Sri Radha Parthasarathi Mandir in Delhi.
- Outside India: There are multiple temples dedicated to Radha Krishna which are established by Iskcon organization and Swaminarayan Sampradaya in all the prominent cities of the world. The Shree Raseshwari Radha Rani Temple at Radha Madhav Dham in Austin, Texas, USA, established by Kripalu Maharaj, is one of the largest Hindu Temple complexes in the Western Hemisphere and the largest in North America.

== Outside Hinduism ==
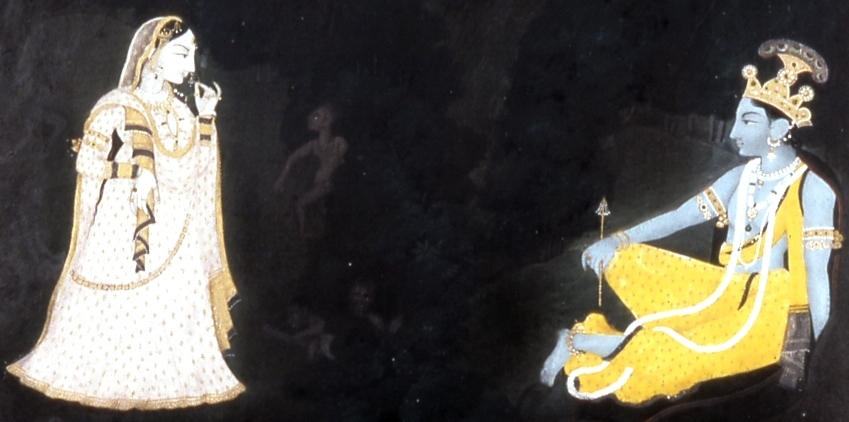
Radha meeting Krishna on a stormy night

Guru Gobind Singh, in his Dasam Grantha, describes Radha the sukl bhis rika thus: "Radhika went out in the light of the white soft moon, wearing a white robe to meet her Lord. It was white everywhere and hidden in it, she appeared like the light itself in search of Him".

Radha is mentioned in many Jain commentaries including the popular Venisamhara by Narayana Bhatta, and Dhvanyaloka by Anandavardhana, written in 7th century. Jain scholars like Somadeva Suri and Vikram Bhatta continued mentioning Radha between 9th and 12th centuries in their literary works.

== See also ==
- Ashtasakhi
- Radha Tantra
- Radhe Radhe
- Rahi (goddess)
