= Rahi (goddess) =

Regional form of Hindu goddess Radha

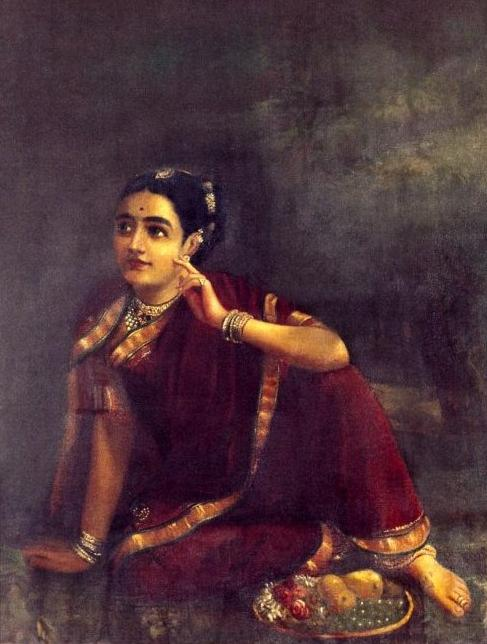
- Painting of Radha by Raja Ravi Verma
- Other names: Rahimai, Radhika
- Devanagari: राही
- Sanskrit transliteration: Rāhi
- Venerated in: Warkari tradition
- Affiliation: Radha
- Abode: Pandharpur
- Gender: Female
- Region: Maharashtra, India
- Temple: Vithoba Temple
- Consort: Vithoba

Rahi (IAST: Rāhi), also called Rahimai, is a regional form of the Hindu goddess Radha in the Indian state of Maharashtra. She is associated with Vithoba (Vitthal), the local form of Krishna. According to local legends, Rahi is the wife of Vithoba. Indian sociologist G. S. Ghurye states that the regional form "Rahi" is derived from "Radhika", another name of Radha.

== Worship ==
Rahi (Radha) is worshipped in the Vithoba Temple complex, Pandharpur. Her shrine, along with that of another consort of Krishna, Satyabhama, is close to the south of the temple of his chief consort, Rakhumai.

== See also ==
- Vithoba
