= Radha Tantra =

Tantric text based on Hindu goddess Radha

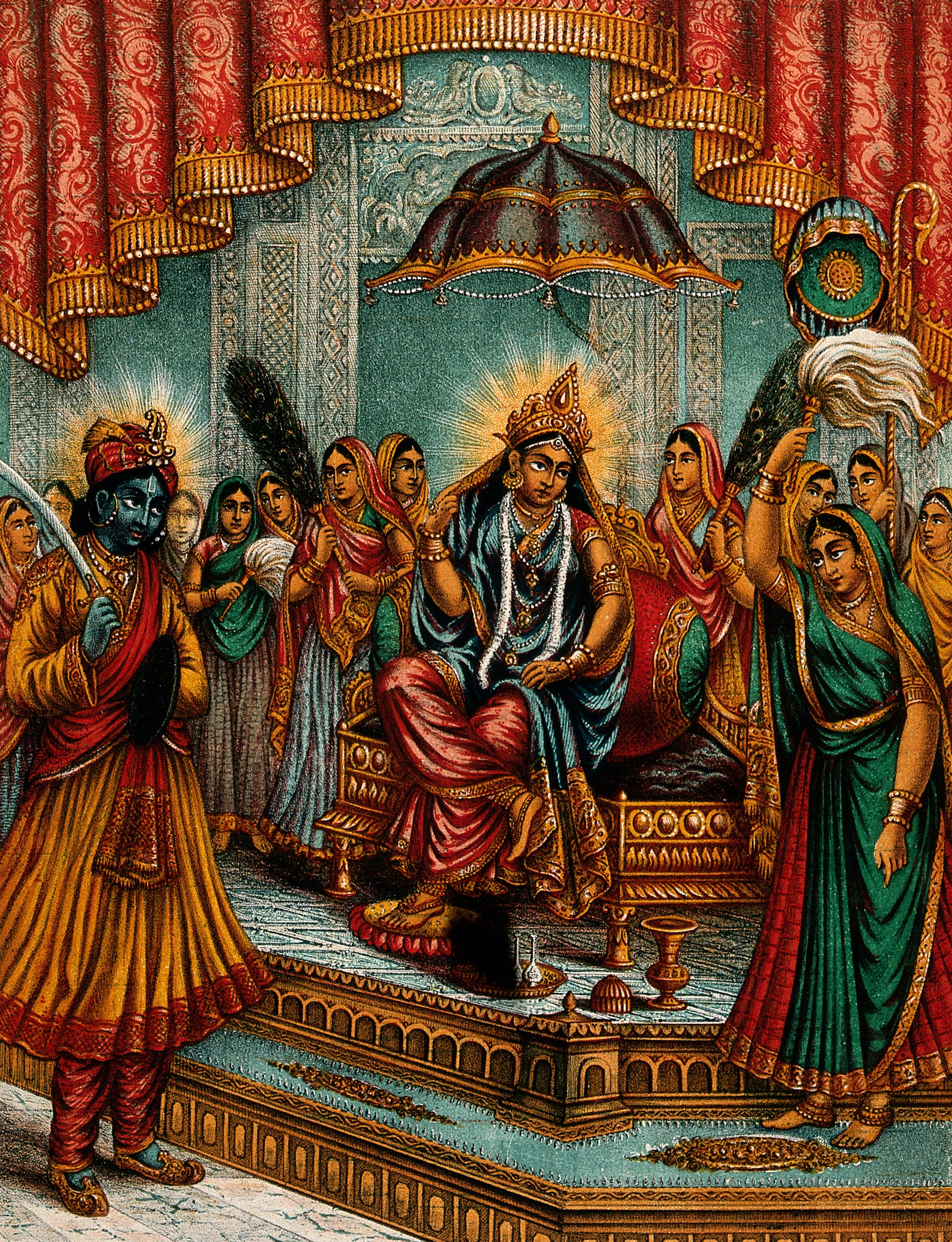
- Chromolithograph depicting an enthroned Radha as the supreme goddess and Krishna standing as her subordinate

Information
- Religion: Hinduism
- Language: Sanskrit
- Period: 17 CE
- Chapters: 37
- Verses: 1,745

The Radha Tantra (Sanskrit: राधा तंत्र, romanized: Rādhātantram), also known as Vāsudevarahasya (Vāsudeva's secret) is a Tantric scripture from Bengal that deals with the story of Radha-Krishna in the backdrop of Vrindavan. The scripture is written in the Sanskrit language and is dedicated to the goddess Radha. The Radha Tantra is a Shakta text, despite its direct association with the Vaishnavite deities Radha and Krishna.

In the text, Radha is the Prakriti-Padmini, who is another form or expansion of Mahavidya Tripura Sundari, while Krishna is identified as a masculine form of Kali. Contrary to the theology of Vaishnavism, this text elevates the goddess as the Supreme Being. Besides being mentioned as the independent goddess, a mentor, and spiritual guru of Krishna, Radha in this text is also portrayed as the partner of Krishna who always has the upper hand in their relationship, giving her the new identity of Shakta Radha (Radha as a goddess of the Shaktism sect).

== Date ==
The exact date of composition of the Radha tantra is uncertain, but its estimated time of composition lies somewhere in between 17th century to 18th century. The oldest extant manuscript (No. 13894, held at Sanskrit College, Kolkata) is dated 1778 CE. It appears to be a copy of an earlier manuscript. Most of the other manuscripts date from the early eighteenth century.

== Origin ==
Radha tantra is an anonymous Tantric text from Bengal region. While most manuscripts of the scripture are found in Bengal region, some manuscripts are also found in Orissa, North India, Bangladesh and Nepal and their number is fairly large.

== Structure ==
Rādhātantram is a fairly extensive Tantric work in Sanskrit. It has thirty-seven chapters or Patalas (“coverings”) with 1,745 verses.

== Description ==
Radha Tantra is Shakta text giving a Shakta reinterpretation of a Vaisnavite story of Radha Krishna. The Rādhātantram text bears formal resemblance to the Mahavidya genre and contextual resemblance to the Vaishnava Sahajiya genre. The frame of the Rādhātantram is a dialogue between Shiva and Parvati where Shiva narrates her the love story and divine pastimes of Radha Krishna and their real spiritual forms. In Radha tantra, Radha becomes the independent goddess and elevates to the stature of Supreme goddess and Krishna's ultimate guru. Krishna here becomes her disciple.The Rādhātantram can serve as a tool to examine textual and doctrinal appropriations that took place between Vaishavism and Shaktism in precolonial Bengal.
