= Radha Madhav Dham =

Hindu temple and ashram complex in south of Austin, Texas (USA)

- Barsana Dham
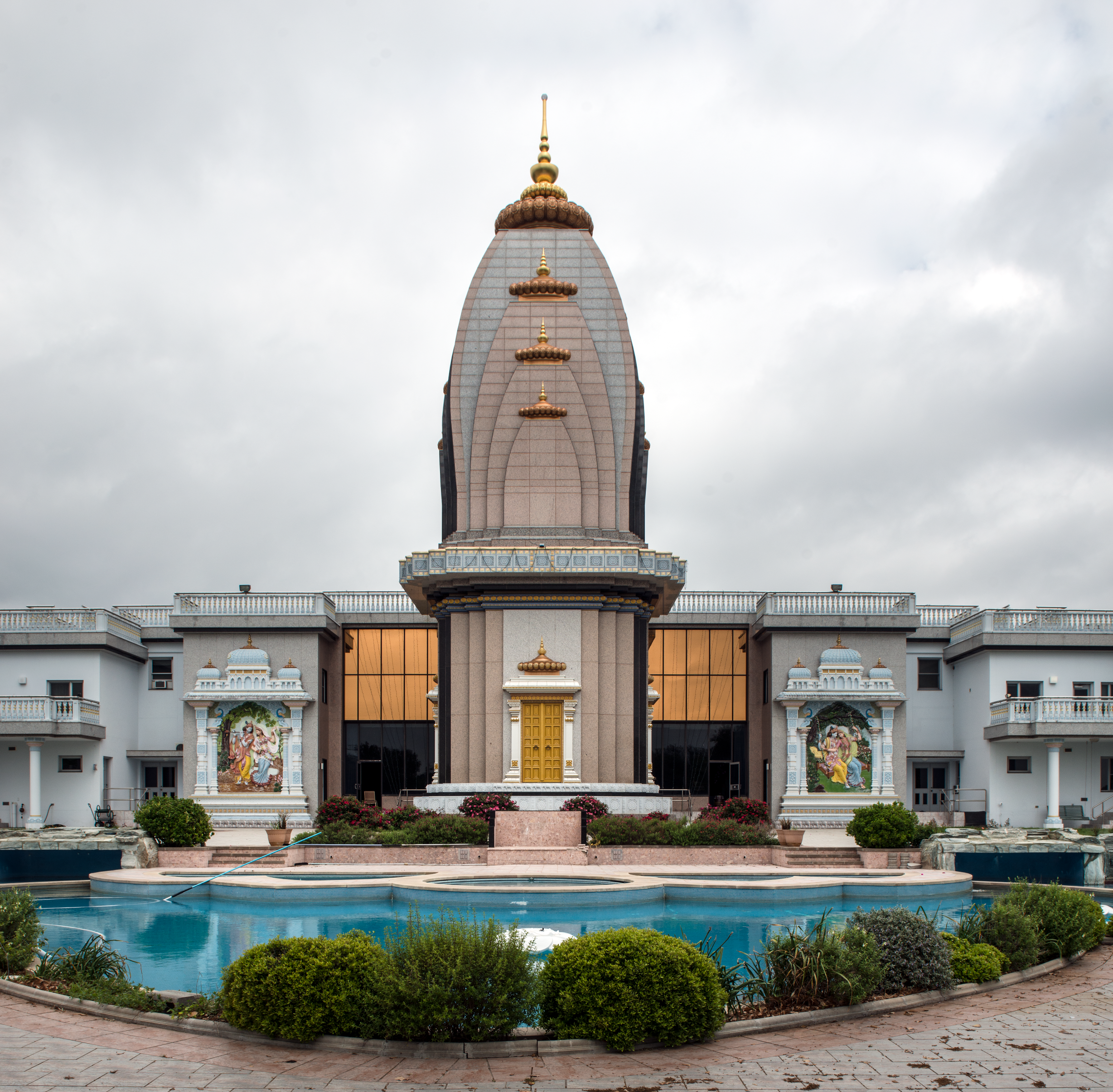
- Radha Madhav Dham in 2014

- Location within Texas

Religion
- Affiliation: Hinduism
- Deity: Radha Krishna

Location
- Location: Near Austin
- State: Texas
- Country: United States
- Coordinates: 30°9′20″N 97°57′28″W

Architecture
- Established: 1990

Website
- radhamadhavdham.org

Radha Madhav Dham, the main U.S. center of Jagadguru Kripalu Parishat, a nonprofit organization located on more than 200 acres of land in Hays County, south of Austin, Texas. It is a Hindu temple and ashram campus, the oldest Hindu Temple in Texas and largest in North America.

Radha Madhav Dham is a nonprofit, religious, educational, and charitable organization that follows the path of raganuga bhakti. The temple is involved in numerous charitable educational projects including JKP Education, which won the Nelson Mandela Peace Award instituted by the Economic Growth Society of India in April 2014.

Jagadguru Shri Kripalu Ji Maharaj was an Indian religious leader, and the founder of Jagadguru Kripalu Parishat (JKP), a worldwide Hindu nonprofit with five main ashrams, four in India and one in the United States. Radha Madhav Dham is the main ashram of JKP the United States. The temple was founded by Prakashanand Saraswati. Saraswati was later sentenced to prison in 2011 for child sex crimes.

== History ==
Radha Madhav Dham was established in 1990 as the main US center of the International Society of Divine Love, which was founded in the 1970s. Radha Madhav Dham was built to be a representation of the holy land of Braj in India where Radha and Krishna are believed by Hindus to have appeared, over 5,000 years ago. It has been designed as a place of pilgrimage in America. Areas of Radha Madhav Dham have been developed to be the places for meditation. Places of Braj like Govardhan, Radha Kund, Prem Sarovar, Shyam Kuti, and others are represented in Radha Madhav Dham where a natural stream named Kalindi represents the Yamuna river of Vrindaban.

On January 9, 2024, News9live shared Radha Madhav Dham to be one of the ten famous Hindu Temples Outside of India.

In April 2011, following the escape and disappearance of its founder Prakashanand Saraswati after his conviction on 20 charges of sexual indecency with a child at Barsana Dham, the organization changed its name.

In 2012, on the one-year anniversary of the trial, Radha Madhav Dham spokeswoman Vrinda Devi stated, "What we've been trying to do since then is moving forward... As far as [Saraswati's] presence, we've subdued that in order to go on and survive as a minority religious community."

== Shree Raseshwari Radha Rani Temple ==
The Shree Raseshwari Radha Rani Temple at Radha Madhav Dham is the first Hindu temple built in Austin, Texas, and one of the largest Hindu temples in the USA. The temple encompasses about 35,000 square feet (3,300 m^{2}) and is topped by a 90-foot (27 m)-high golden dome.

The main prayer hall of the Shree Raseshwari Radha Rani Temple is decorated with the pictorial representations of teachings from ancient Hindu scriptures, which are captioned in both Sanskrit and English. The philosophy of the Hindu scriptures are described in a continuous panel on the sides of the hall. A realistic depiction of the sky is portrayed on the ceiling.

The temple architecture is a blend of north and south Indian, and modern styles of architecture. It was designed by two architects from India. The 90-foot (27 m) high temple dome is made of white and blue granite and gold. The tower is in the traditional shape, but it's built out of granite, whereas most in India are sandstone. The artwork of the temple's shrine was hand-crafted by 15 artisans from South India. The artisans carved the pillars and ceilings with images of peacocks and floral patterns. There are 84 columns and five levels in the building with covered area of 35,000 sq ft (3,300 m^{2}). The temple was built using special construction techniques and processes that are intended to allow it to last for more than a thousand years. A peach orchard, gardens of roses, jasmine and marigolds and wandering peacocks decorate the temple grounds.

Festivals and celebrations at the temple attract up to 8000 people. Approximately 1000 families attend Radha Madhav Dham. 96% of these are Indian, the remaining 4% being Westerners and people of Caribbean descent.

According to Rinehart (2006) and Lee & Nadeau (2011), Radha Madhav Dham is an example of how builders of Hindu Temples in the US have replicated the sacred Geography of India, providing a familiar space and experience for Hindus from India, and fostering an identification with their adopted homeland.

== Festivals ==
Radha Madhav Dham celebrates all the major Hindu festivals which attract thousands. The Temple is home to one of the biggest Janmashtami celebrations in North America. To commemorate the yearly Rath Yatra festival at the temple, October 27, 2001 was named 'Radha Rani Rath Yatra Day' by Austin Mayor Kirk Watson. The 2011 Rath Yatra celebration was attended by "Bhajan Samrat" Anup Jalota. Various other Mayors of Austin and Governor of Texas have visited or offered commendations to Barsana Dham. 50,000 visitors from both Indian and Western communities participate in the lessons, religious programs and celebrations there.

== Retreats and family camps ==
At various times throughout the year, the temple offers special weekend family retreats, mini-intensives, and weekend seva retreats. These retreats and programs include Hindi, yoga and Indian dance classes. Radha Madhav Dham has been named one of the "best places to relax, reflect, and renew". Radha Madhav Dham also conducts tours for schools, other educational institutions and community groups. In 2007, the temple and ashram was featured in National Geographic's "The 100 Best Vacations to Enrich Your Life".

Radha Madhav Dham also organizes free family camps and "Basics of Hinduism" courses in Hindu temples in Dallas, Houston, Washington, D.C., and New York.

Each fall, the Texas Yoga Retreat, organized by Charles MacInerney and Ellen Smith is held at the ashram. This retreat provides an opportunity to experience ashram living along with 250-plus other yoga enthusiasts. There is also a new year retreat organized by Radha Madhav Dham. This weekend long stay involves relaxation and meditation. Families are welcome to the yoga classes and meditation sessions, and a 24-hour continuous chant known as Akhand Sankirtan takes place from noon on New Year's Eve to noon the following day.

== Educational and charitable activities ==
Radha Madhav Dham opened its doors to Hurricane Katrina evacuees, and executed a fundraising drive in its wake. In September 2008, Radha Madhav Dham launched a fundraising drive for victims of the flooding in Bihar. The immediate goal of the drive was to raise US$150,000 for relief efforts. In the same month, hundreds of evacuees of Hurricane Ike were given food and shelter at Radha Madhav Dham. Radha Madhav Dham is also active in a number of local and global charitable activities including housing rehabilitation work in Central Texas, flood relief efforts for India, and the ongoing support of hospital operations oversees. The temple hosted 300–400 evacuees from Hurricane Rita in 2005. Radha Madhav Dham has organized charitable walks in Dallas to raise funds for its $2.3 million Kripalu Charitable Hospital in the town of Barsana, India which was inaugurated in 2008. Besides the hospital in Barsana, JKP Radha Madhav Dham's center in India also opened the 'Kripalu Charitable Hospital' in Mangarh in 2003. That facility provides free diagnostic exams, treatment, surgical procedures, hospitalization, emergency services and medication to hundreds of patients daily. National eye camps and mother/child welfare programs also have been established throughout India, providing free eye exams, cataract surgery and polio vaccines to those in need.

Radha Madhav Dham participates in inter-religious services such as Austin Area Interreligious ministries, Hindu-Jewish Solidarity Day and PBS's Many Voices project. The organization was selected to represent Hinduism at the Parliament of the World's Religions in 1993.
