= Shri Radhika Krishnashtaka =

The Radhika Krishnashtaka is a hymn within the Swaminarayan Sampradaya. It is said that the reciter can get to Krishna via his consort Radha by chanting it. As it is composed of eight verses it is known as ashtak and is embedded into the Satsangi Jivan The BAPS does not recite this but instead recite the Shri Swaminarayan Ashtakam.

== Lyrics ==
नवीनजीमूतसमाना वर्णम, रत्नोल्लसत कुंडल सोभीकरणम; ↵महाकिरीटाग्रमयूरपर्ण, श्री राधिकाकृष्णा महं नमामि (कोरस ) .. १

निधाय पाणीद्वितीयेन वेणुं, निजाधरे शेखरयातरेणुम; ↵निनादयन्तं च गतौ करेणुम, श्री राधिकाकृष्णमहं नमामि .. २

विशुद्धहेमोज्जवलपित्तवस्त्रम हतारियूथं च विनापि शस्त्रं; ↵व्यर्थीकृतानेकसुरद्विडस्त्रं, श्री राधिकाकृष्णमहं नमामि .. ३

अधर्मतीश्यारदिनसाधुपालं, सद्धर्मवैरासुरसंघकालं; ↵पुष्पादिमालं व्रजराजबालं, श्री राधिकाकृष्णमहं नमामि .. ४

गोपीप्रियारंम्भितरासखेलं, रासेश्वरीरंजनकृतप्रहेलम; ↵स्कन्धोंल्लस सतकुंकुंम चिन्ह चेलं, श्री राधिकाकृष्णा महं नमामि .. ५

वृन्दावने प्रीततया वसन्तं, निजाश्रितानापद ऊद्धरन्तं; ↵गोगोपगोपीरभिनंदयन्तं, श्री राधिकाकृष्णा महं नमामि .. ६

विष्वद्विषण्ममथदर्पहारं, संसारिजीवांश्रयणीयसंसारम; ↵सदैव सत्पुरुसौख्यकारं, श्री राधिकाकृष्णा महं नमामि .. ७

आनन्दितात्मव्रजवासितोकं, नंदादिसंदर्शितदिव्यलोकं; ↵विनासितस्वांश्रीतजिवशोकं, श्री राधिकाकृष्णा महं नमामि .. ८

== Translation ==
Whose bodily complexion is like the dark monsoon clouds, Whose ears are decorated with earrings bedecked with various gems and diamonds;

Who is decorated with peacock feathers in the front of His helmet, Shree is Laxmi, So I pay my obeisances to Shree RadhaKrishna along with Laxmiji .. 1

His turban is decorated with different beautiful flowers, whose scented pollen is falling on the flute imparting its fragrance to the flute.

I pay my obeisances to Shree Krishna along with Radhika and Laxmi, who with His one hand is holding the fragrant flute on His lips and with the other plays it very sweetly .. 2

He is wearing bright yellow cloth which is effulgent like pure gold, He who is annihilating many demons without the use of any weapons;

He who has failed all the weapons and techniques used by His enemies, I pay my obeisances to Shree RadhaKrishna along with Laxmiji .. 3

He is the protector of all the saintly people who are being harassed by the irreligiosity, He who is death personified for the people who are not following the prescribed Bhagvat Dharma.

He who is decorated by garlands of various flowers, and who is the son of king of Vraja, that is Nanda Maharaj, I pay my obeisances to Shree RadhaKrishna along with Laxmiji .. 4

He who is playing the rasa dance with His beloved devotees - gopis, He is playing this rasa dance to satisfy His devotees who are expert at rasa dance;

He is wearing on His shoulder, a cloth decorated with kumkum (red powder) marks, I pay my obeisances to Shree RadhaKrishna along with Laxmiji .. 5

He who is residing in Vrindavan with great love, He is the ultimate protector (in all circumstances) of all those who has surrendered unto His Lotus Feet completely;

He who is giving transcendental pleasure to cows, cowherd men and women of Vraja, I pay my obeisances to Shree RadhaKrishna along with Laxmiji .. 6

He who has conquered Kamadev (the cupid) who is the enemy of every living entity and is controlling them, He who is the ultimate shelter of every living entity in this world full of miseries;

He who is the giver of pleasure to everyone following religion and regulative principles, I pay my obeisances to ShreeShree RadhaKrishna along with Laxmiji .. 7

He who is always giving pleasure to the residents of Vraja by His transcendental pastimes, He who is mercifully showing His Dhama (residence) to Nanda and other devotees;

He who diminishes the sadness of the living entity surrendered to His Lotus Feet, I pay my obeisances to Shree RadhaKrishna along with Laxmiji .. 8

== See also ==
- Krishna
- Radha
- Swaminarayan
- Swaminarayan Sampradaya
