= Vishakha Tripathi =

Indian spiritual leader (1949 – 2024)

Vishakha Tripathi (10 February 1949 – 24 November 2024) was an Indian spiritual leader who was the President of Jagadguru Kripalu Parishat and the eldest daughter of Kripalu Maharaj. She received several awards for her work in the field of girls' education, healthcare and philanthropy. As part of her responsibilities, she oversaw the charitable hospitals of Jagadguru Kripalu Parishat.

Jagadguru Kripalu Chikitsalaya, established in 2015, is a fully-charitable hospital in Vrindavan, is a multi-facility 100-bed hospital that serves the needy residents in the Braj region. Two other hospitals, established in Kripalu Dham Mangarh and Barsana in 2003 and 2007 respectively also provide free healthcare services to the poor.

Tripathi also lead the Kripalu Balika Inter College, a charitable educational institution for girls in Kunda (Pratapgarh). In April 2023, a student of the school secured the fifth rank in Uttar Pradesh state board examinations.

Under Tripathi's guidance, Jagadguru Kripalu Parishat also managed three temples -- Prem Mandir, Bhakti Mandir and Kirti Mandir, which are known worldwide. Prem Mandir is one of the ten largest Hindu temples worldwide.

== Death ==
On 24 November 2024, Tripathi Ji died in a traffic collision on the Yamuna Expressway, near Greater Noida, after the vehicle she was travelling in was struck by a dumper truck. She was 75.

== Leadership & Awards ==
As President of Jagadguru Kripalu Parishat, Tripathi worked towards fulfilling the legacy of Jagadguru Kripalu Ji Maharaj, including the completion of Kirti Mandir and the construction of the Jagadguru Smriti Swaroop Museum in Kripalu Dham Mangarh. She also oversaw the expansion of the JKP free hospital and established an annual aid program providing essential goods and educational materials to 20,000 students.

Tripathi received numerous awards for her work in girls' education, healthcare and philanthropy. The key awards included:

- Nelson Mandela Peace Award (2014)
- Mother Teresa Excellence Award (2013)
- Top 50 Indian Icon Award (2016)
- Rajiv Gandhi Global Excellence Award (2013)

Tripathi was conferred an honorary Doctorate in Literature (D. Litt.) by The Open International University for Complementary Medicines of Colombo at its 52nd International Congress in 2014.

On 21 December 2024, Dr. Tripathi received the Lifetime Achievement Award posthumously for her outstanding service to humanity. The award was conferred by the Asia Pacific Vascular Society.

== Writings ==
Tripathi was a contributor to The Speaking Tree on topics of spirituality and Vedic philosophy. She was also the author of a four-volume book series titled Spirituality in Daily Living.
