= Kripalu Mahila Mahavidyalaya =

Higher education institution for women

Coordinates: 25°43′26″N 81°30′52″E

- Motto: Sa Vidya Tanmatir Yaya
- Motto in English: True knowledge alone leads to devotion to God
- Type: Self-financed
- Established: 1998
- Founder: Jagadguru Shri Kripalu Ji Maharaj
- Location: Kunda, Uttar Pradesh, India
- Affiliations: Prof. Rajendra Singh University (formerly Allahabad State University)
- Website: jkpeducation.org.in/institution/kripalu-mahila-mahavidyalaya

Kripalu Mahila Mahavidyalaya is a higher education institution (degree college) for women, located in Kunda, Pratapgarh district, Uttar Pradesh, India. It was founded by Jagadguru Shri Kripalu Ji Maharaj in 1998 to empower girls from economically and socially disadvantaged backgrounds by offering free, high-quality education. The college is totally charitable and provides undergraduate and postgraduate courses in various disciplines.

== History ==
Kripalu Mahila Mahavidyalaya was established to encourage the higher education of women in an area deemed among the most under-developed in the Indian state of Uttar Pradesh. It is among multiple educational institutions run by Jagadguru Kripalu Parishat, a non-profit spiritual, educational, and philanthropic trust established in 1970.

== Courses ==
The college is affiliated with Prof. Rajendra Singh (Rajju Bhaiya) University, formerly known as Allahabad State University. It offers the following degree programs:

- Bachelor of Arts (B.A.)
- Bachelor of Science (B.Sc.)
- Master of Arts (M.A.)
- Bachelor of Education (B.Ed.)

== National Service Scheme ==
The college actively participates in the National Service Scheme (NSS), a voluntary student initiative supported by the Ministry of Youth Affairs and Sports, Government of India. Through the NSS, students engage in community service and social welfare projects, contributing to national development and civic responsibility.

== Facilities ==
The college is self-financed and provides 100% free education to all students. In addition to tuition-free academics, the institution ensures access to necessary learning materials, uniforms, and other essentials to remove financial barriers for underprivileged students.

== Associated institutions ==
Kripalu Mahila Mahavidyalaya is part of the larger network of educational institutions founded by Jagadguru Shri Kripalu Ji Maharaj:

- Kripalu Balika Primary School – established in 2007, offers classes from Nursery to Class 5
- Kripalu Balika Intermediate College – established in 1978, offers education from Class 6 to Class 12

Together, these institutions provide free education to approximately 5,000 girls, from Kindergarten through Post Graduation.

== Extra-curricular activities ==
Kripalu Mahila Mahavidyalaya places strong emphasis on all-round student development. Regular extracurricular activities include:

- Cultural programs
- Music and dance classes
- Art and craft workshops
- Yoga sessions
- Sports and athletics

The college also organizes competitions such as essay writing, storytelling, and elocution to foster creativity, confidence, and critical thinking. Special celebrations on national holidays and festivals aim to instill social and moral values.

== Achievements ==
In 2023, Muntaha Afreen, a student of the Bachelor of Science program, secured the Gold Medal for achieving the highest marks among 720 affiliated colleges of Prof. Rajendra Singh (Rajju Bhaiya) University.

== Encouragement from well-known figures ==
Kripalu Mahila Mahavidyalaya celebrates its Annual Day function ‘Utthan’ or uplift to celebrate the impact that its students continue to create throughout India. It has been endorsed by well-known public figures such as Manisha Koirala and Arbaaz Khan.

== Leadership ==
The institution was overseen by Dr. Vishakha Tripathi, President of Jagadguru Kripalu Parishat till 2024.

It is currently led by her younger sisters and fellow JKP Presidents Dr. Shyama Tripathi and Dr. Krishna Tripathi.

== See also ==
- Jagadguru Shri Kripalu Ji Maharaj
- Jagadguru Kripalu Parishat
- Kripalu Balika Primary School
- Kripalu Balika Intermediate College
- Education in Uttar Pradesh
- Women's education in India
- Prem Mandir, Vrindavan
