= Jagadguru Kripalu Parishat =

Indian spiritual organization

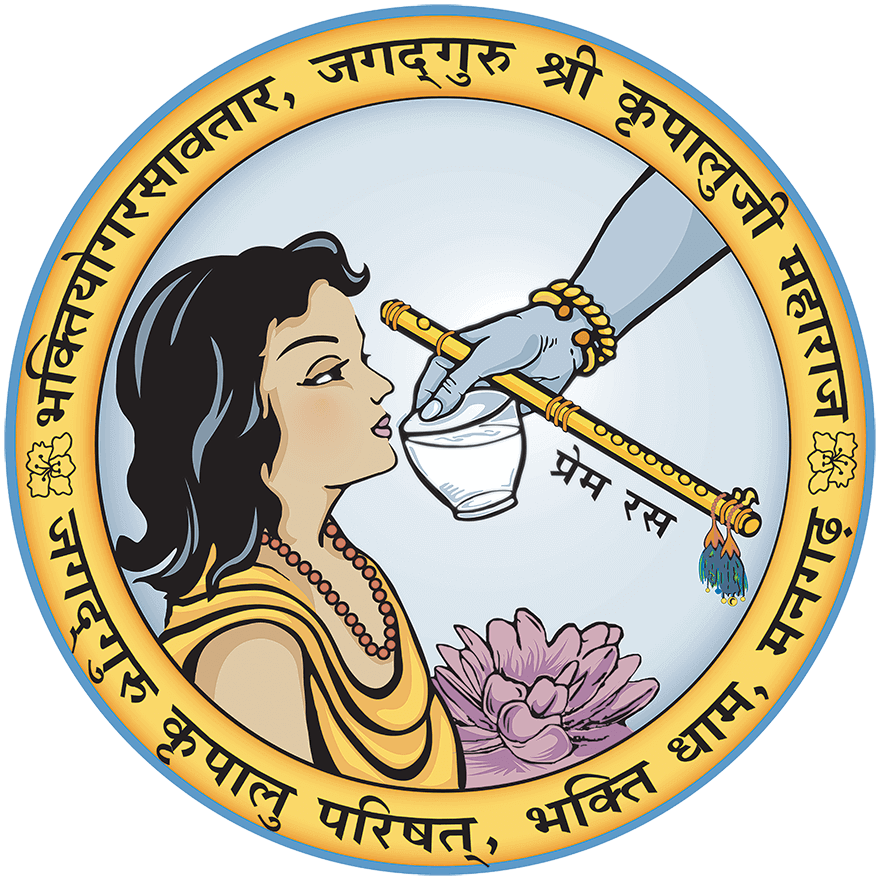
- Jagadguru Kripalu Parishat
- Abbreviation: JKP
- Formation: 1970 (56 years ago) Mangarh, Pratapgarh, India
- Founder: Kripalu Maharaj
- Type: Nonprofit Organization
- Legal status: Charitable Trust
- Headquarters: Mangarh, Pratapgarh, India; Vrindavan, India
- Region served: Worldwide
- President: Dr. Shyama Tripathi & Dr. Krishna Tripathi
- Affiliations: Hinduism
- Website: jkp.org.in www.jkpliterature.org.in

Jagadguru Kripalu Parishat (JKP), previously known as Sadhna Bhawan Trust, is a religious organization in India. It was established in 1970 by Kripalu Maharaj and is currently administered by three presidents appointed by him. The organization oversees three major temples: Bhakti Mandir in Mangarh, Prem Mandir in Vrindavan, and Kirti Mandir in Barsana.

== Beliefs and practices ==
JKP teaches that Kripalu Maharaj is the 5th Jagadguru.

Members of JKP are expected to contribute financially and receive benefits from donations such as meeting with Kripalu Maharaj.

== Monuments ==
- Prem Mandir is a religious and spiritual complex situated on a 54‑acre site on the outskirts of Vrindavan, Mathura, India. It is dedicated to the Hindu deities Radha Krishna, Rama and Sita, and is built from Italian marble. It first opened to the public on 17 February 2012. In March 2026, the President of India, Droupadi Murmu, visited the temple complex as part of a three-day spiritual tour. During her visit, she performed the evening Aarti, witnessed the musical fountain and laser show, and was presented with a book on the life of Jagadguru Kripalu Ji Maharaj by the temple authorities.
- Prem Bhavan is a 73,000‑square‑foot temple in the form of a pillarless dome, constructed adjacent to Prem Mandir. It can accommodate up to 25,000 people.
- Bhakti Mandir, located in Mangarh, is a 108‑foot‑tall stone temple built with pink sandstone, white marble, and black granite. The foundation stone was laid on 26 October 1996, and the temple was inaugurated in November 2005.
- Bhakti Bhavan, also in Mangarh, is a 73,000‑square‑foot pillar-less dome located next to Bhakti Mandir.
- Radha Madhav Dham (Shree Raseshwari Radha Rani Temple) is located in Hays County, near Austin, Texas, United States. Covering approximately 35,000 square feet (3,300 m^2), the temple is topped by a 90-foot (27 m) dome clad in white and blue granite and gold. It is described as one of the largest Hindu temple complexes in the Western world.
- Kirti Mandir, in Barsana, stands 111 feet (34 m) tall and features 12 pillars made from Emerald Peri Granite. The main entrance pillar was erected by Kripalu Maharaj. Inside are four carved panels and 24 half-pillars decorated with depictions of Sakhis.
- Radha Govind Bhakti Yog Mandir in Brzegi, near Kraków, Poland. The appearance of the temple is based on the temple near Austin. Open in 2022, it's first temple of Jagadguru Kripalu Parishat in Europe.

== Philanthropy ==
Under JKP Trust, Kripalu Maharaj established three main groups. In March 2020, JKP presidents Vishakha Tripathi, Shyama Tripathi, and Krishna Tripathi announced a contribution of Rs 10,000,000 to the PM CARES Fund. The initiative was intended to support the Uttar Pradesh state government’s response to the COVID-19 outbreak.

=== JKP Hospitals ===
A philanthropic hospital, Jagadguru Kripalu Chikitsalaya (JKC) was established in 2003. The organization aims to help sick people of remote locations in India, where there is lack of medical facilities. The setup of JKC began with the construction of two hospitals in Uttar Pradesh: first in Kunda in November 2003 and second in Barsana in January 2007. In September 2015, JKC opened its third facility in Vrindavan, housing medical equipment, doctors' and nurses' living quarters, as well as 100 beds to treat patients. These facilities offer healthcare to local village populations.

=== JKP Education ===
Under JKP, the Jagadguru Kripalu Parishat Education (JKPE), provides free schooling to over 5,000 village girls living near and around Kunda. The education covers pre-primary to postgraduate levels. Using technology and amenities through three institutions in Pratapgarh, Uttar Pradesh, Jagadguru Kripalu Parishat Education provides education to underprivileged girls from Pratapgarh and nearby areas and has helped over 55,000 children from these areas. Warm jackets and food bowls are provided regularly for school children from Pratapgarh, Vrindavan, and Barsana.

=== JKP Social ===
JKP Social provides an array of social services through various funds that help widows, the poor, and the underprivileged. As of April 2020, 35,000 impoverished people had received resources from JKP to stay comfortable during the 2019 winter. The Poor Relief Fund has provided resources like blankets, jackets, clothing, food items, school bags, furniture (such as benches or chairs), and many other necessities annually to nearly 100,000 impoverished residents of Braj, located in Vrindavan and Barsana.

== Awards ==
- UP State Mahotsav Award, a state-level award for charity in health and education, received on 10 January 2015
- Zee Sargam Award, a national-level award for social service and education of girls, was received on 5 November 2014
- Nelson Mandela Award, a national award for charitable contribution to society, 19 April 2014
- Nari Today Award by I Next for extraordinary work, remarkable contribution in female education, received in 2013
- Mother Teresa Excellence Award by the Economic Growth Society of India for educating girls, received in 2013
- Rajiv Gandhi Excellence Award, noted as India's highest honor for outstanding achievements in charity, in May 2012
- Top 50 Indian Icon award

== Allegations against Kripalu Maharaj ==
- In the 1990s, Kripalu Maharaj was arrested for allegedly raping two young girls. In the end, the prosecution was dismissed due to a lack of evidence.
- In 2010, Kripalu Maharaj was arrested in Trinidad and Tobago after a 22-year-old Guyanese woman alleged that she was raped by Kripalu after going to seek spiritual assistance in one of his religious centers. The case was ultimately dropped due to a lack of evidence.
- One of Kripalu's disciples, Prakashanand Saraswati, was convicted of groping two young girls in his ashram in Hays County, Texas. A 12-person jury declared Saraswati guilty of 20 counts of child molestation, after 50 minutes deliberation, on Friday 4 March 2011. Though convicted, he was released after TV infomercial entrepreneur, Barsana Dham officer, and California consumer tech company Ideal Living under founder and CEO Peter Spiegel "put up a $1 million cash bond". Spiegel had previously "signed a $10 million indemnity agreement in October 2008". According to the Austin American-Statesman, Spiegel's attorney Barry Hitchings said that he would contest the agreement. Spiegel said that he was one of about 40 followers present for a Sunday dinner at Marsha Kent's home with Prakashanand Saraswati the evening before Saraswati left the country. Spiegel said, "It never entered my mind that he wouldn't come" to trial. As part of the bond condition, Saraswati was barred from entering the Barsana Dham.
- After Saraswati fled the country, Deputy U.S. Marshal Robert Marcum alleged that members of JKP aided Saraswati in his escape and relocation to India. Marcum said, "It is the most sophisticated scheme I've seen as far as fugitive investigations go. They were very smart about what they did."
- Five women who were former members of the organization accused Kripalu of sexual assault.
