= Kashi Vidvat Parishad =

Organisation of Vedic and scriptural scholars

Kashi Vidvat Parishad is an assembly of Vedic and scriptural scholars based in Varanasi (also known as Kashi), India. It is regarded as an authoritative body on matters of Hindu philosophy and scripture. The Parishad comprises scholars of the Vedas, Vedanta, Nyaya, Vyakarana (Sanskrit grammar), and other branches of Indian philosophy. It issues authoritative proclamations on religious practices, such as validating philosophical doctrines or guiding reconversion processes, and prioritizes scriptural primacy over modern reinterpretation.

The Kashi Vidvat Parishad conferred the title of Jagadguru upon Jagadguru Kripalu Ji Maharaj in 1957. Ramyatna Shukla (1932−2022) was one of the presidents of the Kashi Vidvat Parishad.

== Organization ==
The Kashi Vidvat Parishad comprises scholars of the Vedas, Vedanta, Nyaya, Vyakarana (Sanskrit grammar), and other branches of traditional Indian philosophy. The Parishad functions as a forum for scriptural deliberation, scholarly discussion, and the issuance of opinions on religious and cultural matters.

== Leadership ==
Ramyatna Shukla (1932–2022) was a Sanskrit scholar and linguist who served as president of the Kashi Vidvat Parishad. He received several academic honours, including the President's Award in 1998, the Keshav Award, the Vachaspati Award, and the Vishwabharti Award. He also held the title of Mahamahopadhyaya.

In 2021, Shukla was awarded the Padma Shri, India's fourth-highest civilian award, for his contributions to Sanskrit education and social work. Following his death in September 2022, Prime Minister Narendra Modi expressed condolences and paid tribute to his contributions to Sanskrit scholarship.

In October 2022, Vashisht Tripathi, a former Vice-Chancellor of Sampurnanand Sanskrit University, became president of the Parishad following Shukla's death.

Under Tripathi's presidency, the Parishad has continued to issue opinions on matters relating to Hindu religious traditions. In 2024, it issued a ruling concerning the timing of the Jagannath Rath Yatra.

== Public engagements ==
In November 2024, the Kashi Vidvat Parishad issued a public statement declaring that the annual Rath Yatra of Jagannath must be held on the Dwitiya Tithi of the Ashadha month, as per scriptures. The opinion was issued in response to a request from Divyan Singh Deb of Puri, who sought the Parishad's counsel after learning that some groups planned to hold the yatra in December. Ramnarayan Dwivedi, general secretary of the parishad, stated that conducting the yatra on any other date was "unacceptable" and went against established tradition.

In December 2024, when the demand to re-open a centuries-old Shiva temple in Varanasi's Madanpura area emerged, the Kashi Vidvat Parishad was tasked with examining ancient scriptures to determine the temple's origins and significance. Professor Ramnarayan Dwivedi, General Secretary of the Parishad, stated that a team was studying the Puranas, particularly the Kashi Khand of the Skanda Purana, to ascertain the antiquity and mythological importance of the temple, identifying the presiding deity as Siddheshwar. After the temple was physically reopened in January 2025, the disctrict administration confirmed that regular worship would begin after consultation with the Kashi Vidvat Parishad, Annapurna Temple, and other religious leaders, with the Parishad advising that worship would commence after the conclusion of the Hindu month of Kharmas.

== Cultural Revival and Social Reform ==
This Council has recently been at the forefront of multiple initiatives to uphold scriptural traditions and revive India's ancient knowledge systems. Padma Shri Prof. Vishwamurti Shastri stressed a need to make Vedic traditions relevant today and simplify Sanskrit for the common public. In a recent move towards social reform, the Council introduced a comprehensive "Hindu Code of Conduct" of 400 pages in July 2025, which bans dowry, curbs lavish wedding expenses and also establishes a simplified process for reconversion to Hinduism. Along with that, the Council has taken a conservative stance on certain local customs, opposing the 'Masane ki Holi' (playing Holi with ashes) at Varanasi's cremation grounds. They argued that a 'shamshan' holds a certain sanctity and is not a place for festivities according to the scriptures. The Council is asserting its influential role in interpreting and shaping Hindu social and religious life in contemproray India.

== Branches in India ==
=== Jammu and Kashmir ===
The Kashi Vidvat Parishad has a branch in Jammu and kashmir, known as the Jammu and Kashmir Shri Kashi Vidvat Parishad. This branch was established by September 2023, with its foundation day celebrated on September 20, 2023. This even was addressed by Lieutenant Governor Manoj Sinha. The President and Founder of this branch is Padma Shri Prof. Vishwamurti Shastri. In April 2026, the branch held its monthly meeting in Jammu, during which Prof. Shastri emphasized the roots of Indian culture lie in ancient texts. The Vedas, Upanishads, Puranas are the Indian roots. He stressed, Sanskrit is not merely a language but the foundation of Indian Knowledge and science, and advocated for simplifying and popularizing Sanskrit to make it accessible to the common public. General Secretary Dr. Vijendra Shastri also gave the report of the activities being conducted in the branch. Also there were many workshops and seminars which drew the participation from the students and researchers. Soon there will be a seminar on "Indian Knowledge Tradition". The executive body suggested forming local committees, strengthening coordination with social organizations and launching campaigns in rural areas to promote Sanskrit and Indian culture.

== Recognition of Akshar-Purushottam Darshan ==
In 2017, the Shri Kashi Vidvat Parishad formally recognized the Akshar Purushottam darshan, a philosophical treatise authored by Sadhu Bhadreshdas, as a distinct and unique school of Vedantic philosophy. Former President, Acharya Shri Ramyatna Shukla, current President Acharya Shri Vashistha Tripathi, and General Secretary Pandit Shivji Upadhyay feicitated Sadhu Bhadreshdas for his contribution of Swaminarayan Siddhanta Sudha, a Vadgrantha offering exposition and defense of the Akshar-Purushottam Darshan's philosophical principles. The Parishad concluded that the Akshar-Purushottam Darshan is distinct from Advaita, Vishishtadvaita, Dvaita, Shuddhadvaita, and other established doctrines, and is a Vedic siddhanta (established truth). Along with that, the council even declares Sadhu Bhadreshdas as a Acharya and a contemprory commentator (Bhashyakar) in the lineage of commentators on the Prasthanatrayi (the Upanishads, Bhagavad Gita, and Brahma Sutras). This recognition was then endorsed by the 17th World Sanskrit Conference in Vancouver, Canada, in July 2018, where scholars acknowledged it as the first new independent school of Vedant since the 16th century.

== See also ==
- Varanasi
- Jagadguru
- Hinduism
- Sanskrit
- Vedanta
- Jagadguru Kripalu Maharaj
