= Kirti Mandir =

Kirti Mandir may refer to these memorial temples in Gujarat, India:

- Kirti Mandir, Vadodara, the cenotaph of Gaekwad rulers of Vadodara
- Kirti Mandir, Porbandar, the birthplace memorial of Mahatma Gandhi

== See also ==
- Kirti Mandir, Barsana, a place in Barsana, Uttar Pradesh, India
