= Prakashanand Saraswati =

Indian spiritual leader

Swami Prakashanand Saraswati
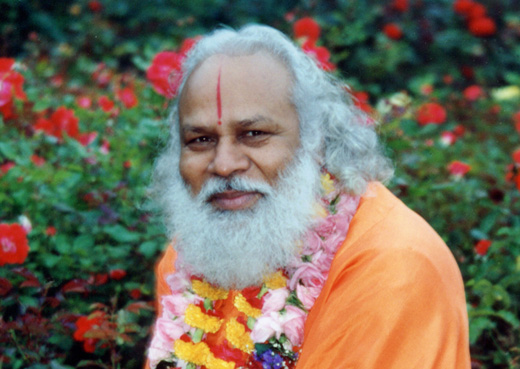
- Born: 15 January 1929; Ayodhya, India
- Disappeared: 7 March 2011 (age 82); Hays County, Texas, U.S.
- Other name: Swamiji
- Occupation: Sannyasi
- Status: Fugitive
- Conviction: Child molestation (× 20)
- Penalty: 280 years in federal prison; $200,000 fine

Prakashanand Saraswati, also known as Swamiji, (born 15 January 1929; disappeared 7 March 2011) is a Hindu monk, guru from Ayodhya, India. Previously, he founded the Hindu religious organisation the International Society of Divine Love and the Radha Madhav Dham temple in the United States. In 2011, a jury found Swami Prakashanand Saraswati guilty on 20 counts of indecency with a child. He remains a fugitive and appeared on the Fox TV show America's Most Wanted.

== History ==
Swami Prakashanand Saraswati was born in a Brahmin family in 1929 in Ayodhya, India. His early life was fraught with intense religious feelings, and as a youth he became a reclusive mystic so that he might find God. He completed his studies and aged 21, renounced the world and took the order of sannyasa from his guru, Kripalu Maharaj. In 1952, he was offered to become the Jagadguru Shankaracharya of Jyotirmath, but he declined.

He spent the next 20 years as a wandering ascetic in the Himalayas and in the forests of central India, ending in Braj. Following the strict discipline of sannyas, he first lived in the Himalayas (Joshimath, Badrinath, Rishikesh, Haridwar, etc.), forests of Amarkantak, near the Narbada River, Allahabad and Kashi for about four years. Later, he went to Vrindaban and then to Barsana where he spent over 18 years in the deep woodlands of Braj. In 1975, he emerged from his solitary life he began his mission of teaching the path of bhakti.

He founded the International Society of Divine Love in India in 1975. The society was established in New Zealand in 1978. Later on he travelled to America and founded an ashram for his devotees and disciples. By 1981 Swami Prakashanand Saraswati, who had begun to be thought of as a distinguished sage and a saint, conceived of creating a global mission, establishing religious centres in India, England, Ireland, Singapore, New Zealand, and Australia.

== Writings and awards ==
Swami Prakashanand Saraswati has written over nine books on various aspects of Hindu ethics, scriptures and practices. He has represented the Hindu religion at the Millennium World Peace Summit.

In 1999 he wrote The True History and the Religion of India: A Concise Encyclopedia of Authentic Hinduis, a "monumental dissertation" on the history of Indian civilization and religion. The eight-hundred-page tome is entitled The True History and the Religion of India. It is a comprehensive history of religion in Indian culture. The book has received laudatory comments from prominent Hindu academics and leaders in the United States and India. It was released by The Minister of State for Information & Broadcasting Shri Ramesh Bais. The encyclopaedia won an award at the World Religious Parliament in New Delhi in 1999. In 2001, the book was published by Motilal Banarsidass. It has subsequently been published by Macmillan Publishers.

A simplified and abridged version of the book for college students, entitled Amazing Facts about Hinduism, was released at the Global Dharma Conference in 2003. He was awarded the title of "Dharm Chakravarti" in India for his efforts in "reestablishing authentic Hinduism".

His writings in the scientific and spiritual fields have been acclaimed by well known scientists, social and religious leaders including P. S. Veeraraghavan, Tarun Vijay, Om Prakash Pande, E. C. George Sudarshan, Jayendra Saraswathi and Swaroopanand Saraswati.

== Research with Maxwell Cade ==
Saraswati's state of "conscious ecstasy", and the effects of his Divine Love Meditation, was studied by Maxwell Cade in the 1970s. Cade, a leading physicist of London, and Fellow of the Royal Society of Medicine, had been doing psycho-biological research during the 1970s on meditation and the altered states of the consciousness of the mind. Cade co-developed the "Mind Mirror", a portable EEG machine that could monitor the alpha, beta, delta and theta rhythms from each brain hemisphere simultaneously. In the 1970s, a number of eastern religious teachers expressed an interest in participating in Cade's research, and agreed to have their brain rhythms measured. In 1976 when he was touring England, Saraswati requested to participate in Cade's research. Cade and his team found patterns they had not seen before. Cade concluded that the Swamis' spiritual training conferred unusual powers of healing and perception.

Cade spent two weeks with Saraswati to measure his brainwaves, and he always seemed to be in this "Awakened Mind" pattern. Furthermore, he measured brainwave patterns, only previously measured in a few rare individuals, that Cade characterizes as the "State beyond the Awakened Mind". Cade commented: ". . . he has attained to that level of consciousness at which he is in the higher reaches of meditation and in everyday waking consciousness at the same time". On one occasion, Cade says that Saraswati "produced the most beautiful fifth-state pattern on the Mind Mirror for more than an hour while engaging in an intense debate with Professor John Hasted, a noted physicist". Saraswati wanted to test out the effects of his new form of meditation called the "Divine Love Meditation." He had Cade test subjects while listening to a tape consisting of chanting and they measured the effects. According to Cade, both experienced and non-meditators were able to produce a form of "Awakened Mind" pattern while listening to these tapes.

He writes, "Those who have close contact with His Divinity know that he remains continually in his Divine-Love transcendence. This corresponds to what Carl Jung termed 'the Transcendent Function.'" Further, Cade writes that he "had not seen anyone who could equal Swamiji's feat of touching a number of subjects on the head and immediately raising their pattern of consciousness by two levels, from the ordinary waking state into the advanced fifth state. In at least one of these subjects, the higher state persisted for three days and was an unforgettable experience." Cade's wife reportedly had an "unforgettable experience" from meeting Swami Prakashanand Saraswati and participating in the study. Cade characterised it as "an experience of great impact". It was, he wrote later: ". . . a perfect opportunity to study his remarkable EEG patterns under varying circumstances, to discuss the application of scientific methods to the study of meditation, and to learn about Divine Love Meditation at the feet of this great Master".

Cade published his research in his "landmark book", The Awakened Mind. Cade's research with Swami Prakashanand Saraswati has also been discussed in several other publications including by Hill (1979), Inglis & West (1983), Treece (1989) and Peake (2013). Cade showed evidence for temporary and in some cases long-term elevation of state even after twenty minutes of Divine Love Meditation.

== Trial, conviction and disappearance ==
In 2007, three former residents of Barsana Dham (Radha Madhav Dham), aged between 27 and 30 years old, told Hays County, Texas police that they had been abused at the ashram when they were as young as 12 by Saraswati, who was then arrested on 25 April 2008.

A 12-person jury declared Saraswati guilty of 20 counts of child molestation, after 50 minutes deliberation, on Friday 4 March 2011. During the trial, he had been free on a $10 million bond provided by TV infomercial entrepreneur Peter Spiegel. As part of the bond condition, Saraswati was barred from entering the Barsana Dham.

In April, following the disappearance of its founder, the ashram changed its name.

Prosecutors were criticized for losing evidence required for his defense. The evidence included missing video of the testimony of one of the accusers, damaged DVD backup discs and computers. Saraswati's lawyers said the video tape was important because “There’s no physical evidence of any kind” and "it represents the primary method by which Defendant's counsel can impeach the complainant's testimony at trial."

Radha Madhav Dham has distanced itself from Saraswati. One month after the trial, then "Barsana Dham" leaders "changed the organization's name and erased the once-omnipresent images and mentions of the former guru from the premises."

In 2012, on the one year anniversary of the trial, Vrinda Devi, Radha Madhav Dham spokeswoman, stated that "What we've been trying to do since then is moving forward."

The punishment phase of the trial was scheduled for Monday morning of 7 March 2011. However, Saraswati didn't show up for his trial and his disciples and legal team said that they didn't know his whereabouts. Defense attorney Jeff Kearney said he believed his client's health was the likely reason behind Saraswati's absence. The jury sentenced him in absentia to 280 years and a US$200,000 fine. At the penalty hearing, Spiegel said he hadn't understood the terms of the original bond agreement. On 4 November 2011, Texas Watchdog reported that he had been required to pay only $200,000 of the $10 million bond, plus the previously disclosed $1 million. Hays County attempted to keep the amount secret but a November 2011 ruling from the state Attorney General's office made it clear that the amount is clearly public record. Federal officials believe Saraswati's followers moved him to Mexico in March 2011, and then helped him travel to India on a fake passport in November 2011.

As of December 2025, Interpol has issued a red notice for Saraswati's extradition.

== See also ==
- List of fugitives from justice who disappeared
- Jagadguru Kripalu Parishat
