= Kripalu Maharaj =

Hindu spiritual leader (1922–2013)

Kripalu
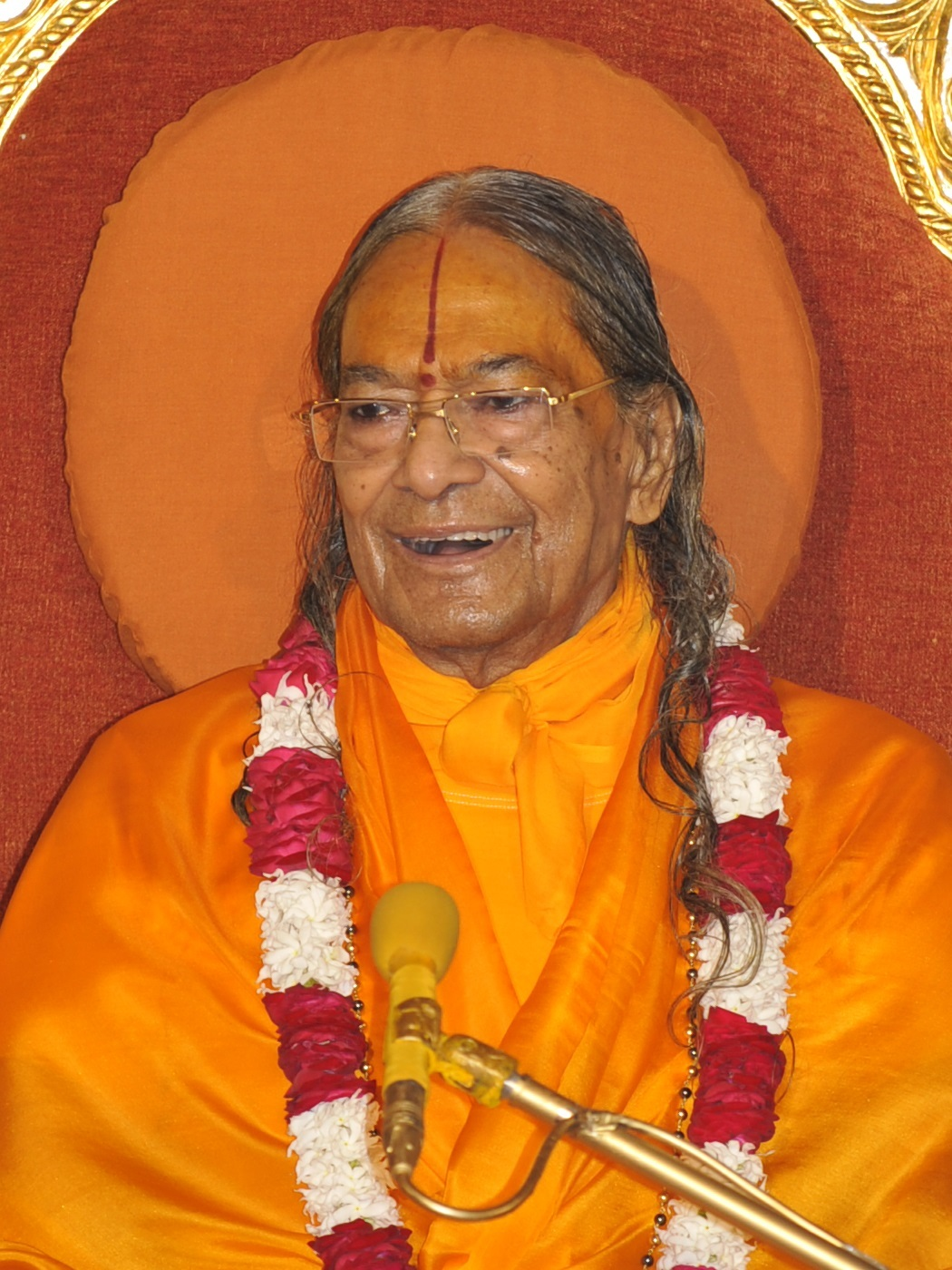
- Kripalu in 2009

Personal life
- Born: Ram Kripalu Tripathi; 5 October 1922 Mangarh, Pratapgarh, United Provinces, British India (present-day Uttar Pradesh, India)
- Died: 15 November 2013 (aged 91) New Delhi, Delhi, India
- Home town: Kripalu Dham, Mangarh, Pratapgarh (present-day Uttar Pradesh, India)
- Notable works: Prem Ras Siddhant; Prem Ras Madira; Shyama Shyam Geet; Radha Govind Geet; Braj Ras Madhuri Part 1-4; Yugal Shatak; Yugal Ras; Yugal Madhuri; Bhakti Shatak; Radha Trayodashi; Kripalu Trayodashi
- Website: Official website

Religious life
- Religion: Hinduism
- Lineage: Bhakti yoga

Religious career
- Post: Shrimat Padavyakya Pramana Paravarina; Vedamarga-Pratisthapan Acharya; Nikhildarshan Samanvayacharya; Sanatana Vadic Dharma Pratishthapana Satsampradaya Paramacharya; Bhaktiyoogarasavatar; Bhafavadananta Shri Vibhushita Jagadguruttam
- Period in office: 1957–2013

Sanskrit name
- Sanskrit: कृपालु जी महाराज

Jagadguru Kripalu Maharaj (born Ram Kripalu Tripathi; 5 October 1922 – 15 November 2013) was an Indian spiritual guru who founded Prem Mandir, a major pilgrimage and tourist destination in Vrindavan and Jagadguru Kripalu Parishat (JKP). JKP is a Hindu non-profit organization with five main ashrams, four in India and one in the United States.

On Makar Sankranti, 14 January 1957, he received the title of Jagadguru (world teacher) from the Kashi Vidvat Parishad.

== Jagadguru philosophy and title ==
=== Jagadguru Kripalu Bhaktiyog Tattvadarshan ===
Jagadguru Kripalu Ji’s spiritual philosophy known as “Jagadguru Kripalu Bhaktiyoga Tattvadarshan” is based on the teachings from the Vedas and posits that the soul’s true goal is eternal divine bliss, found not in material objects, but only in God. Since the soul is a part of God, it naturally seeks Him. This bliss is attained through God's grace, received by the complete sharanagati (surrender) of the mind.

Detachment from the material world, through understanding its impermanence, is key. As propagated by the saints of bhakti movement, the path of bhakti (devotion) — selfless love for Radha Krishna — is preferred over karma (action) and gyan (knowledge) as it’s the most direct. It automatically brings divine knowledge and detachment. Bhaktiyog, involves loving remembrance of God (Roopdhyan meditation), even during daily duties (karmayog). A true saint’s (Guru) guidance and avoiding bad company (kusang) are essential to advance through this path.

=== Jagadguru title ===
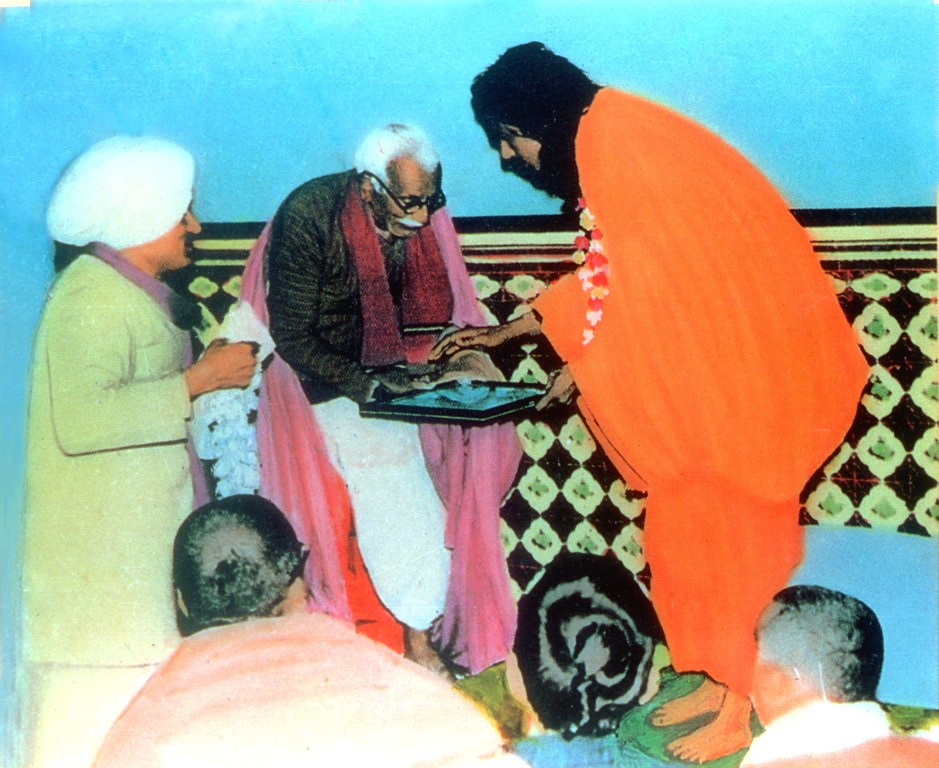
Receiving the title of Jagadguru from the scholars of Kashi Vidvat Parishad (the distinguished and exclusive organization of 500 Vedic scholars) (false colour)

In 1955, Kripalu Maharaj organized a religious convention for spiritual leaders in India. Mahamahopadhyay Giridhar Sharma, President of the Kashi Vidvat Parishat, attended the convention and was impressed by Kripalu's scriptural knowledge. In 1957, Kripalu Maharaj was invited to lecture for ten days on scripture philosophy at the Kashi Vidvat Parishat, a group of 500 scholars of Vedic literature. The congregation had scholars from Varanasi and other parts of India. Kripalu Maharaj lectured for seven days about the Hindu scriptures. On 14 January 1957 the scholars honoured him with the title of 'Jagadguru'. He was 34 years old when given the title, the fifth person ever to receive it. The Kashi Vidvat Parishat also conferred on him the titles Bhaktiyog-Ras-Avtar and Jagadguruttam, as well as the title Samanvaya-Acharya: he who analyses and reconciles the meaning of all the scriptures, the six philosophies and the teachings of other previous Jagadgurus.

=== Life after becoming Jagadguru ===
Following his recognition as Jagadguru in 1957, Kripalu Maharaj conducted an extensive nationwide mission, delivering month-long spiritual discourses that drew significant public gatherings. A distinguishing feature of these discourses was his scholarly approach; independent observers noted his "phenomenal memory" and his ability to provide precise references in his lectures—including chapter and verse numbers—for the vast set of Sanskrit scriptures he quoted.

In 1970, he established Jagadguru Kripalu Parishat (JKP), a charitable religious organization, to disseminate his teachings throughout the world.

Jagadguru Kripalu composed thousands of bhajans and kirtans, including Prem Ras Madira, a collection of 1008 devotional songs. His book on philosophy, Prem Ras Siddhant, discusses the ultimate aim of the individual soul, the importance of attaining divine grace, and the indispensability of surrendering to a Saint. Kripalu Maharaj's bhajan books include Braj Ras Madhuri, Yugal Madhuri, Yugal Shatak, Bhakti Shatak, Yugal Ras, Shyama Shyam Geet, Radha Govind Geet, Krishna Dwadashi and Radha Trayodashi.

During his lifetime, he personally trained more than 50 Pracharaks, male and female monastic disciples. They continue to travel in India and around the world as his ordained representatives, spreading his teachings.

== Legal issues ==
- In the 1990s, Kripalu Maharaj was arrested for allegedly raping two young girls. In the end, the prosecution was dismissed due to a lack of evidence.
- In 2010, Kripalu Maharaj was arrested in Trinidad and Tobago after a 22-year-old Guyanese woman alleged that she was raped by Kripalu after going to seek spiritual assistance in one of his religious centers. The case was ultimately dropped due to a lack of evidence.
- One of Kripalu's disciples, Prakashanand Saraswati, was convicted of groping two young girls in his ashram in Hays County, Texas. A 12-person jury declared Saraswati guilty of 20 counts of child molestation, after 50 minutes deliberation, on Friday 4 March 2011. Though convicted, he was released after TV infomercial entrepreneur, Barsana Dham officer, and California consumer tech company Ideal Living under founder and CEO Peter Spiegel "put up a $1 million cash bond". Spiegel had previously "signed a $10 million indemnity agreement in October 2008". According to the Austin American-Statesman, Spiegel's attorney Barry Hitchings said that he would contest the agreement. Spiegel said that he was one of about 40 followers present for a Sunday dinner at Marsha Kent's home with Prakashanand Saraswati the evening before Saraswati left the country. Spiegel said, "It never entered my mind that he wouldn't come" to trial. As part of the bond condition, Saraswati was barred from entering the Barsana Dham.
- After Saraswati fled the country, Deputy U.S. Marshal Robert Marcum alleged that members of JKP aided Saraswati in his escape and relocation to India. Marcum said, "It is the most sophisticated scheme I've seen as far as fugitive investigations go. They were very smart about what they did."

== Temples ==
Jagadguru Kripalu established three significant temples which serve as centers for bhakti, spirituality, and charitable activities.

=== Prem Mandir, Vrindavan ===
Established on the sacred land of Vrindavan, Prem Mandir is among the biggest and most popular Hindu temples in India. It witnesses a high footfall of devotees, with lakhs of visitors each day. Known for its white Italian carrara marble construction and intricate carvings, the temple is a prominent site for religious gatherings, devotional activities and a evening light and sound show. It makes news for its celebration of major festivals such as Krishna Janmashtami. The President of India Droupadi Murmu, accompanied by the Governor of Uttar Pradesh, Anandiben Patel, visited Prem Mandir on 19 March 2026 during a three-day visit to Uttar Pradesh.

=== Bhakti Mandir, Mangarh ===
Bhakti Mandir is located at the birthplace of Kripalu Maharaj, in Kripalu Dham near Prayagraj. It was inaugurated in 2005 and is dedicated to Radha-Krishna and Sita-Ram. Constructed using pink sandstone, white marble, and black granite, the temple sees a surge in visitors on Hindu festivals such as Diwali and Guru Purnima. Bhakti Mandir is managed by Jagadguru Kripalu Parishat.

=== Kirti Mandir, Barsana ===
Kirti Mandir is situated in Barsana, the birthplace of Radha rani. It is notable for being the only temple in the world dedicated to Kirti Maiya, Goddess Radha’s mother. A unique idol of baby Radha in her mother’s lap is the central attraction of the temple. Lakhs of devotees visit Kirti Mandir around Radhashtami, the birth anniversary of Radha rani. Alongside religious functions, the temple includes a charitable hospital and serves as a site for social welfare activities.

== Women's Education ==
Jagadguru Kripalu Ji Maharaj established charitable educational institutions to encourage the education of girls. Kripalu Balika Primary School, Kripalu Balika Intermediate College and Kripalu Mahila Mahavidyalaya (degree college) are located in Kunda, Pratapgarh district, Uttar Pradesh, India. These institutions empower girls from economically and socially disadvantaged backgrounds by offering free, high-quality education.

== Books and Kirtans ==
=== Philosophical books ===
- Prem Rasa Siddhant (ISBN 978-93-80661-35-3) – 'Prem Ras Siddhant' or 'The Philosophy of Divine Love', a popular book written by Kripalu Maharaj contains the gist of all the teachings of our scriptures.The philosophy of Divine love was first published (in Hindi) in 1955. It was later published in several other Indian languages.
- Bhakti Shatak (ISBN 978-93-80661-26-1) – The concise philosophy of the Upaniṣats, Gītā, Brahma sūtras and the Śrīmad Bhāgavatam.
- Radha Govind Geet (ISBN 978-81-90966-16-0) – Printed in two volumes, with 11,111 couplets of Radha Krishna leelas and the devotional philosophy.
- Ras Panchadhyayi (ISBN 978-93-80661-15-5) – A series of discourses on the esoteric subject of Raas Leela.

=== Kirtans ===
- Prem Ras Madira (ISBN 978-93-80661-27-8) – 1008 songs ("pad") of Radha-Krishna Leelas, Devotional Philosophy and humility.
- Braj Ras Madhuri (Part 1 ISBN 978-93-80661-20-9, Part 2 ISBN 978-93-80661-21-6, Part 3 ISBN 978-93-80661-22-3, Part 4 ISBN 978-93-80661-55-1) – Printed in four parts, hundreds of kirtans dedicated to Radha-Krishna, Sita-Ram, and others.
- Yugal Shatak (ISBN 978-93-80661-30-8) – One hundred "kirtans" of Radha Rani and Krishna.
- Yugal Rasa (ISBN 978-93-80661-29-2) – Kirtans of Radha Krishna.
- Shri Krishna Dwadashi (ISBN 978-93-80661-04-9) and Shri Radha Trayodashi (ISBN 978-93-80661-28-5) – Twelve "padas" describing the beauty and decorations of Krishna, and 13 "padas" about the beauty and decorations of Radha Rani.

Renditions of Kripalu Maharaj's bhajans and kirtans have been recorded by singers such as Manna Dey and Anuradha Paudwal. Anup Jalota,

== See also ==
- Kashi Vidvat Parishad
- Prem Mandir, Vrindavan
- Kirti Mandir, Barsana
