= Vashishth Tripathi =

Indian professor

- Occupation: Professor
- Known for: Nyay Shastra
- Awards: Padma Bhushan

Vashishth Tripathi is an Indian professor who taught Nyay Shastra in Sampurnanad Sanskrit University (SSU). He announced his retirement in 2000. Hareram Tripathi is his pupil who is the Vice Chancellor of SSU. Tripathi is considered a scholar in Nyāya Sūtras, an ancient Indian Sanskrit text composed by Akṣapāda Gautama, and the foundational text of the Nyaya school of Hindu philosophy.

The Government of India awarded him the third highest civilian honor of the Padma Bhushan, in 2022, for his contribution to the field of literature and education.
