= Kirti Mandir, Barsana =

Coordinates: 27.6546°N 77.3806°E

Kirti Mandir
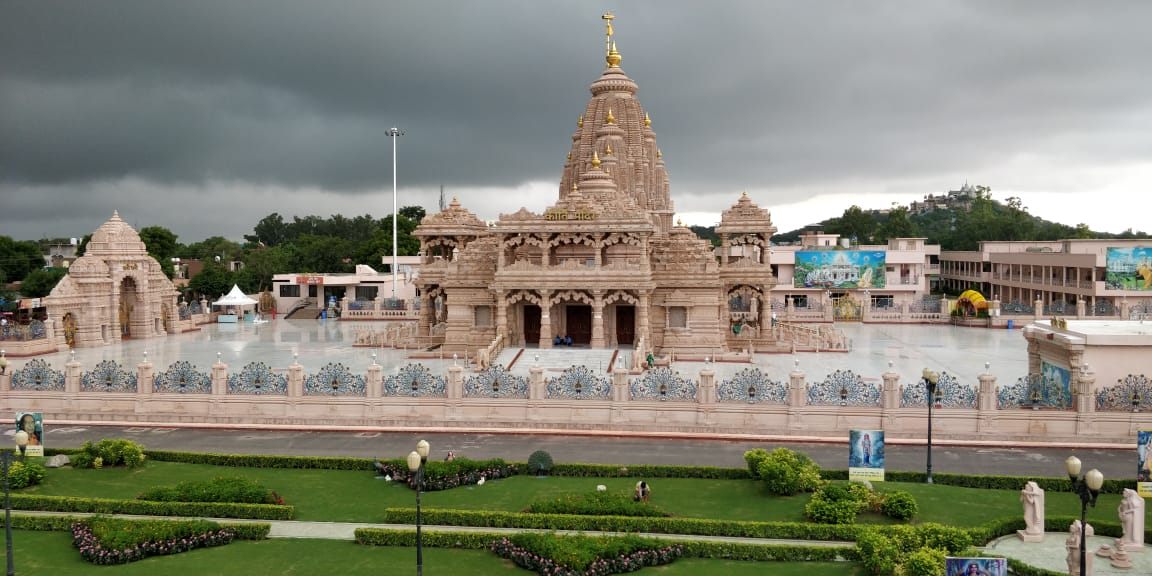

Religion
- Affiliation: Hinduism
- Deity: Mother Kirti, Radha Rani
- Governing body: Jagadguru Kripalu Parishat

Location
- Location: Kirti Mandir, Jagadguru Kripalu Parishat Rangeeli Mahal, Barsana, Dist. Mathura, Uttar Pradesh, India Pin - 281405
- Interactive map of Kirti Mandir

Architecture
- Type: Nagara and Dravidian influences
- Founder: Jagadguru Shri Kripalu Ji Maharaj
- Established: 2019

Kirti Mandir is a Hindu temple dedicated to Kirti Maiya, the mother of Radha Rani, located in Barsana, Uttar Pradesh, India. It is notable for enshrining Radha Rani in her childhood form, seated in the lap of her mother.

== History ==
The concept for Kirti Mandir was envisioned by Jagadguru Shri Kripalu Ji Maharaj. The foundation stone was laid by him in 2006. The temple was inaugurated on 10 February 2019, coinciding with Vasant Panchami. According to local traditions, the temple is situated on the site where Radha Rani spent her childhood. The temple is currently managed by Jagadguru Kripalu Parishat.

== Architecture ==
Kirti Mandir occupies an area of approximately 80,000 square feet. The architectural design incorporates elements of both Nagara and Dravidian styles. The temple is constructed using Italian marble and features 22 golden kalash crowning its domes.

== Deities ==
The primary deity enshrined in the temple is Radha Rani depicted as a child, approximately five years old, seated on the lap of her mother, Kirti Maiya. This representation is considered unique, as it is a prominent temple dedicated to Radha's mother. The temple also houses images of Radha-Krishna and Sita-Ram.
