= Vrindavan =

City in Uttar Pradesh, India

Vrindavan Vrindaban, Brindaban
- City
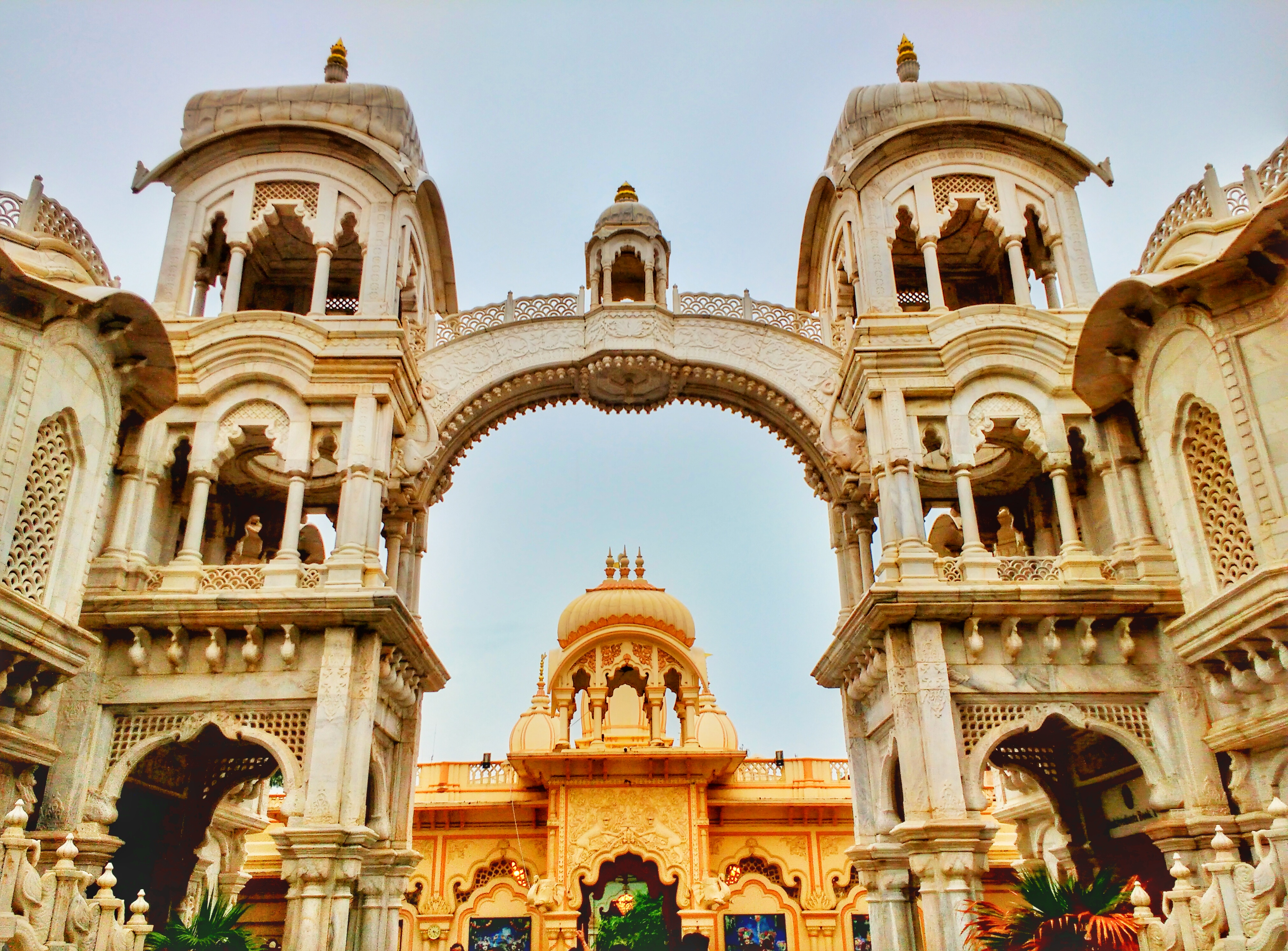
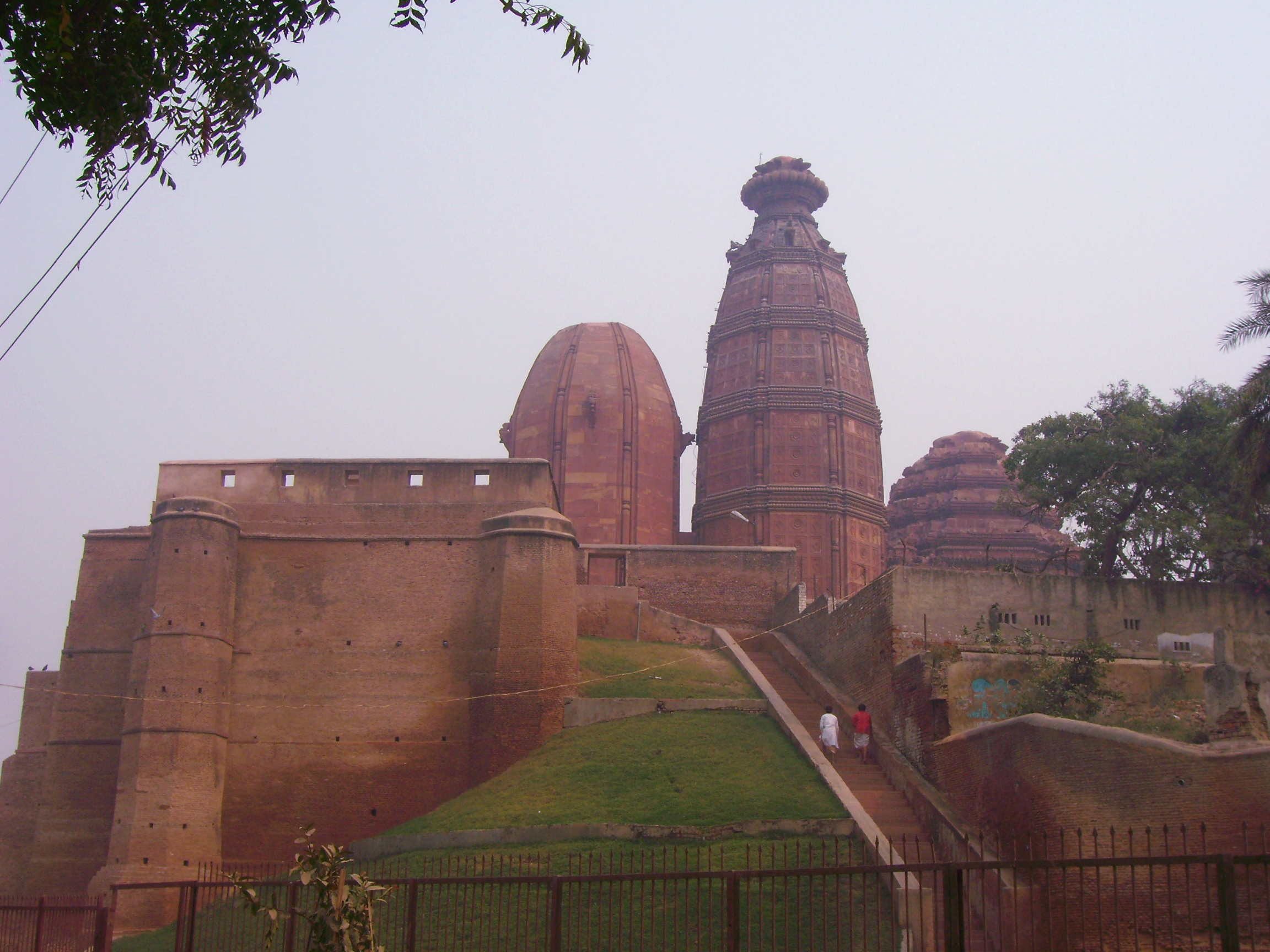
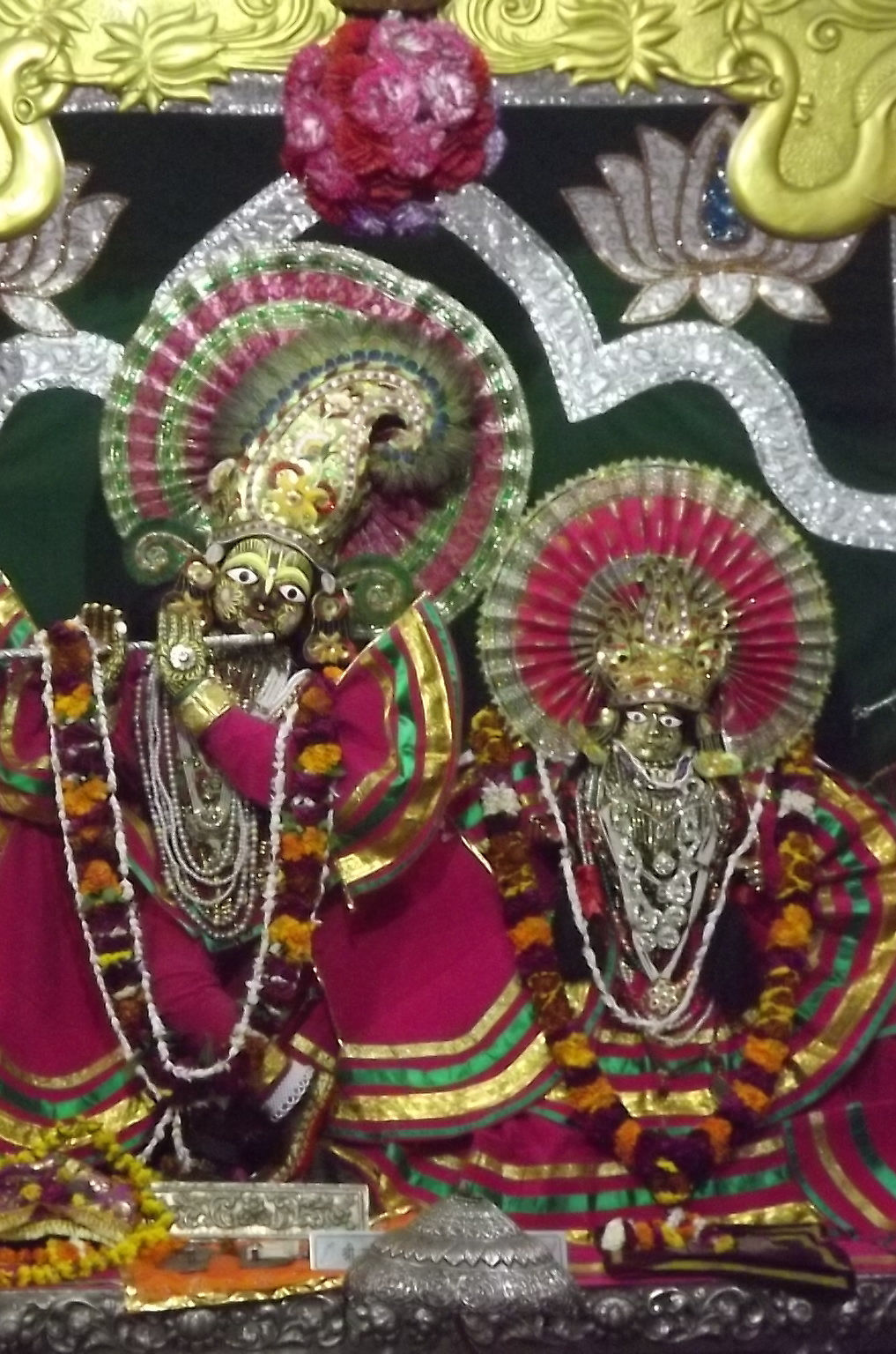
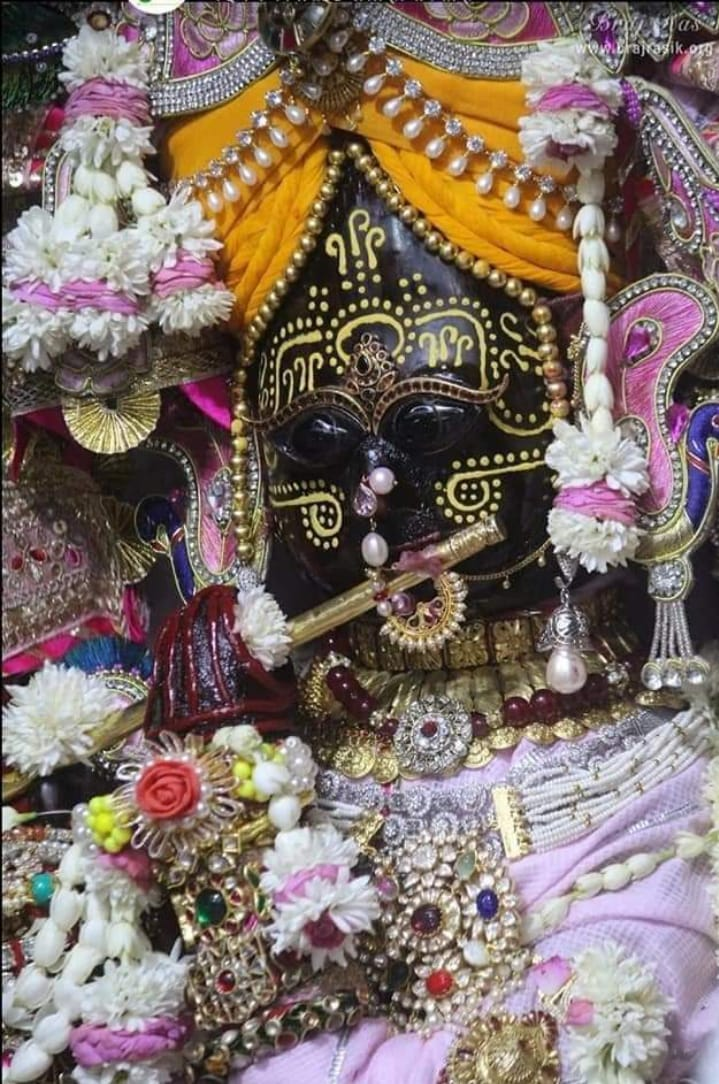
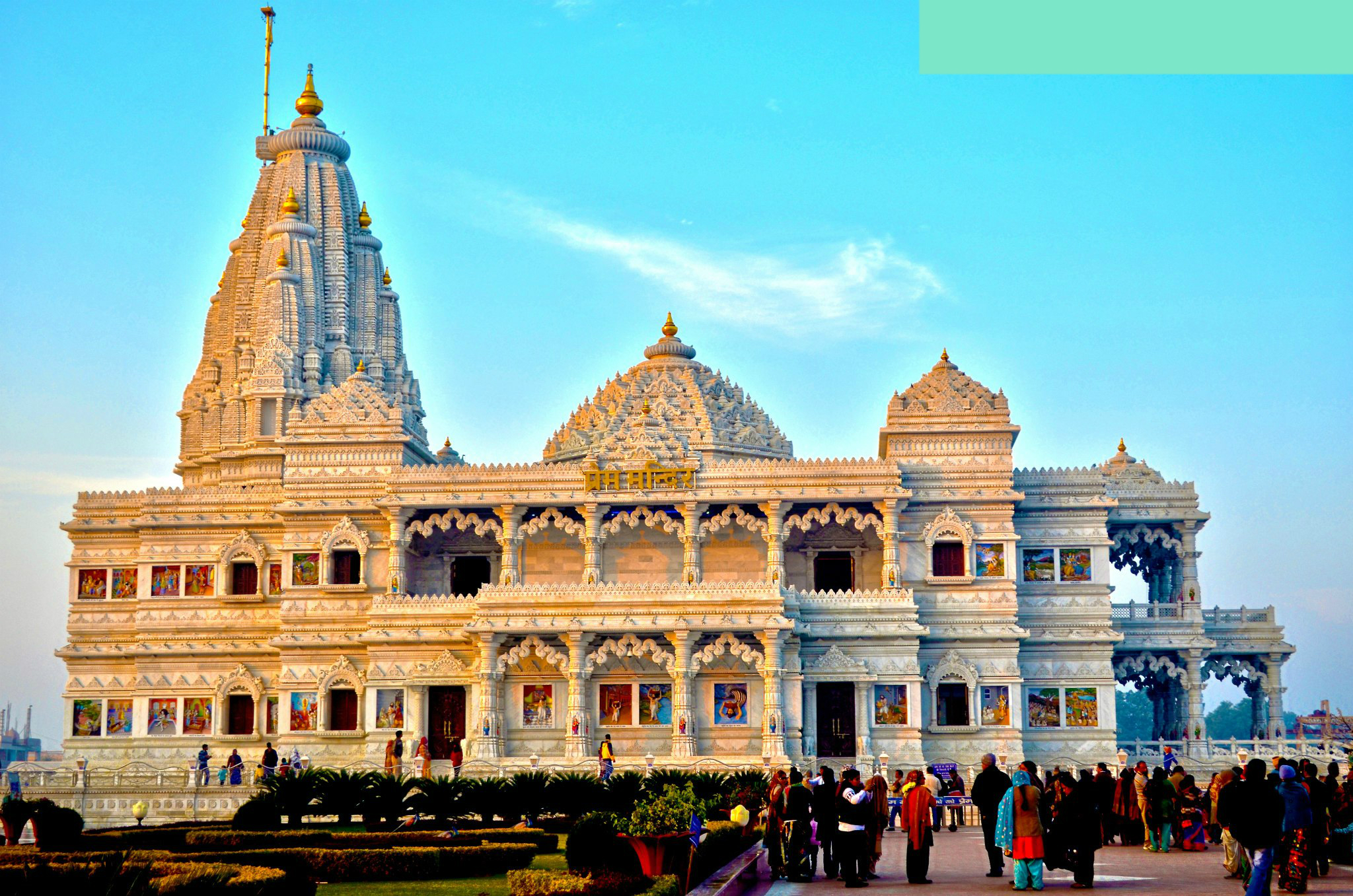
- Clockwise from top: ISKCON Temple , Radha Madanmohan Temple, Radha Damodar Temple, Radha Vallabh Temple, Prem Mandir
- Nicknames: City of Widows
- Location in Uttar Pradesh, India Vrindavan (India)
- Coordinates: 27.58°N 77.7°E
- Country: India
- State: Uttar Pradesh
- District: Mathura

Government
  - Type: Municipal Corporation
  - Body: Mathura-Vrindavan Municipal Corporation
  - Mayor: Vinod Agarwal (BJP)
- Elevation: 170 m (560 ft)

Population (2011)
  - Total: 63,005
- Demonym: Vrindavan wasi

Languages
  - Official: Hindi
  - Native: Braj Bhasha
- Time zone: UTC+05:30 (IST)
- PIN: 281121
- Telephone code: 0565
- Vehicle registration: UP-85

Vrindavan (pronounced [ʋɾɪnˈdɑːʋən]; IAST: Vṛndāvana), also spelt Vrindaban and Brindaban, is a historic city in the Mathura district of Uttar Pradesh, India. It is located in the Braj Bhoomi region and holds religious significance for Hindus, who believe that Krishna, one of the main Gods in Hinduism, spent most of his childhood in this city. Vrindavan has about 5,500 temples dedicated to the worship of Krishna and his chief consort, Radha. It is one of the most sacred places for Vaishnava traditions.

Vrindavan forms a part of the "Krishna pilgrimage circuit" under development by the Indian Ministry of Tourism. The circuit also includes Mathura, Barsana, Gokul, Govardhan, Kurukshetra, Dwarka and Puri.

== Etymology ==
The ancient Sanskrit name of the city, वृन्दावन (Vṛndāvana), comes from its groves of vṛndā (holy basil) and vana (grove, forest).

== History ==
Vrindavan has an ancient past, associated with Hindu culture and history, and was established in the 16th and 17th centuries as a result of an explicit treaty between Muslims and Hindu Emperors, and is an important Hindu pilgrimage site since long.

Vallabhacharya, a 15th-century Indian saint, visited Vrindavan at the age of eleven. Later on, he performed three pilgrimages of India, barefoot giving discourses on Bhagavad Gita at 84 places. These 84 places are known as Pushtimarg Baithak and have since become places of pilgrimage. He stayed in Vrindavan for four months each year. Vrindavan thus heavily influenced his formation of Pushtimarg.

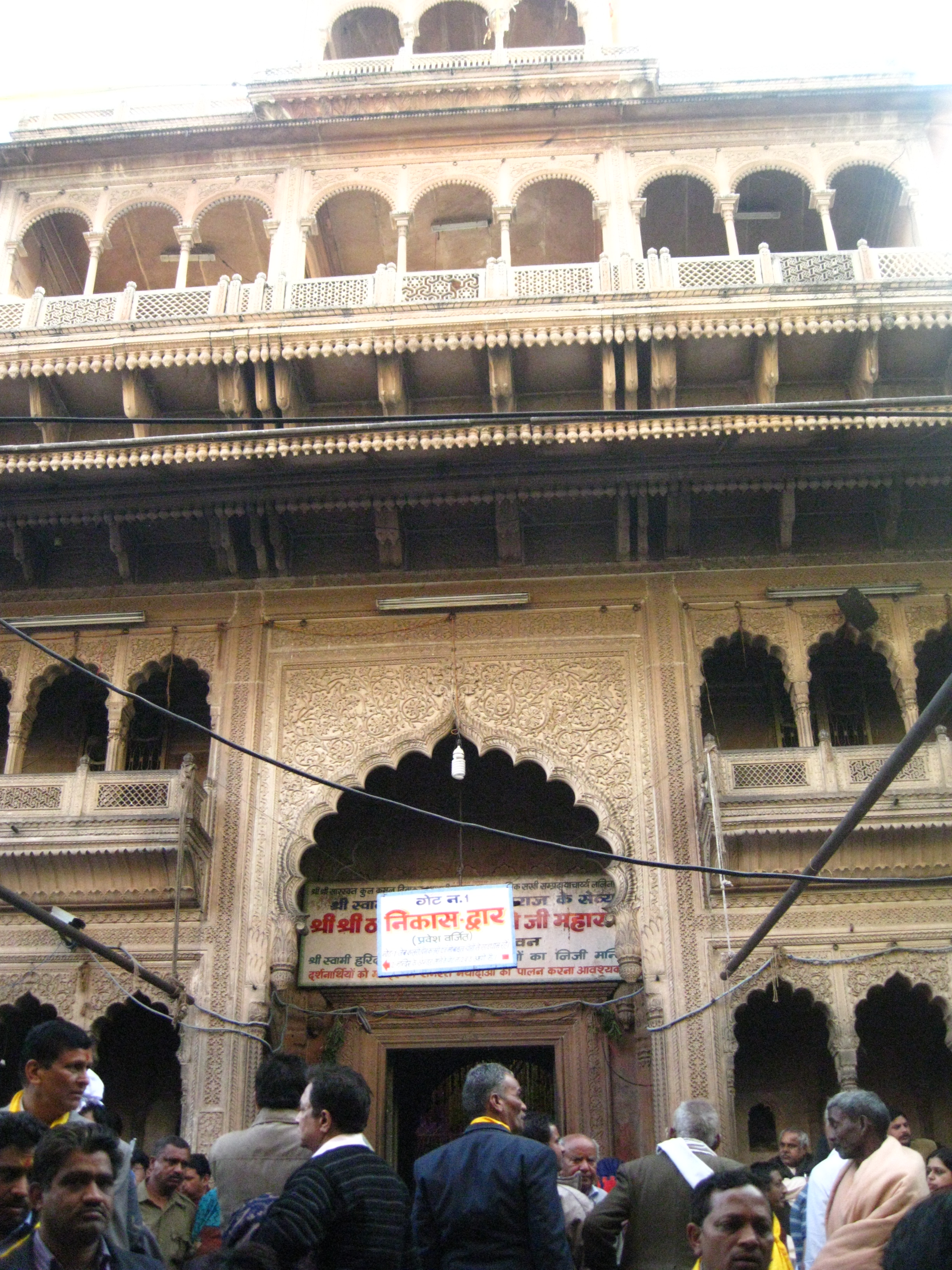
Banke Bihari Temple, Vrindavan

The essence of Vrindavan was lost over time until the 16th century when it was rediscovered by Chaitanya Mahaprabhu. In the year 1515, Chaitanya Mahaprabhu visited Vrindavan, with the purpose of locating the lost holy places associated with Krishna's life.

In the last 250 years, the extensive forests of Vrindavan have been subjected to urbanisation, first by local Rajas and in recent decades by apartment developers. The forest cover has been whittled away to only a few remaining spots, and the local wildlife, including peacocks, cows, monkeys and a variety of bird species has been virtually eliminated.

=== Prem Mahavidyalaya ===
In 1909, Raja Mahendra Pratap Singh established India’s first polytechnic college, Prem Mahavidyalaya in Vrindavan, with the dual vision of promoting education and nurturing nationalist thought. During the inauguration of Prem Mahavidyalaya, Madan Mohan Malviya was also present. Over time, it evolved into an intellectual centre for revolutionary ideas and a meeting place for freedom fighters and Congress leaders.

Prominent figures such as Subhas Chandra Bose, Rabindranath Tagore, Sarojini Naidu, C.F. Andrews, and Jawaharlal Nehru visited the college, leaving their remarks in its visitor book. Mahatma Gandhi spent a day there on 19 April 1915, recording his admiration for Singh’s dedication to the national cause. In 1914, Mahendra Pratap Singh left Prem Mahavidyalaya to seek international backing for India’s independence.

=== Vrindavan Research Institute ===
The Vrindavan Research Institute (VRI) was founded in 1968 by Ram Das Gupta. The institute's primary tasks are the research and professional preservation of original documents—predominantly Manuscripts—dating back several centuries. The analysis of these materials is intended to facilitate the study of various aspects of Indology. The expansive institute complex features an auditorium, an open-air stage, and a museum dedicated to preserving artifacts of Indian Folk art and folklore, as well as the cultural heritage of the Braj region. The institute was authorized to supervise doctoral studies in Sanskrit and Hindi and was recognized by the Museum Association of India as a museum for manuscripts and archival materials.

== Geography ==
Situated on the west bank of the Yamuna River, about 15 kilometres north of Mathura, 90 km from Agra and 125 km from Delhi. Vrindavan has an average elevation of 170 metres (557 feet). The Yamuna river flows through the city.

=== Climate ===
The climate is hot semi-arid (BSh), bordering a humid subtropical climate (Cwa).

Climate data for Mathura (1981–2010, extremes 1974–1995)
Month	Jan	Feb	Mar	Apr	May	Jun	Jul	Aug	Sep	Oct	Nov	Dec	Year
Record high °C (°F)	29.6 (85.3)	34.1 (93.4)	40.1 (104.2)	45.1 (113.2)	47.1 (116.8)	47.6 (117.7)	44.6 (112.3)	42.7 (108.9)	40.6 (105.1)	42.1 (107.8)	35.1 (95.2)	30.1 (86.2)	47.6 (117.7)
Mean daily maximum °C (°F)	21.3 (70.3)	24.4 (75.9)	30.4 (86.7)	36.6 (97.9)	41.2 (106.2)	41.2 (106.2)	36.1 (97.0)	34.6 (94.3)	34.2 (93.6)	33.3 (91.9)	29.1 (84.4)	23.3 (73.9)	32.1 (89.8)
Mean daily minimum °C (°F)	6.4 (43.5)	8.3 (46.9)	13.2 (55.8)	17.9 (64.2)	23.9 (75.0)	25.9 (78.6)	25.5 (77.9)	25.0 (77.0)	23.5 (74.3)	18.3 (64.9)	11.6 (52.9)	7.7 (45.9)	17.3 (63.1)
Record low °C (°F)	1.0 (33.8)	0.5 (32.9)	5.0 (41.0)	7.0 (44.6)	8.5 (47.3)	17.0 (62.6)	11.5 (52.7)	17.5 (63.5)	17.6 (63.7)	11.5 (52.7)	4.0 (39.2)	2.0 (35.6)	0.5 (32.9)
Average rainfall mm (inches)	10.4 (0.41)	13.6 (0.54)	6.8 (0.27)	10.1 (0.40)	17.8 (0.70)	35.5 (1.40)	164.7 (6.48)	205.2 (8.08)	165.0 (6.50)	18.0 (0.71)	3.9 (0.15)	9.0 (0.35)	660.1 (25.99)
Average rainy days	0.9	1.3	1.0	0.9	1.5	3.0	9.0	9.1	4.9	0.9	0.3	1.1	33.9
Average relative humidity (%) (at 17:30 IST)	65	59	53	48	39	43	67	72	71	63	56	60	58
Source: India Meteorological Department

== Demographics ==
As of 2011 Indian Census, Vrindavan had a total population of 63,005, of which 34,769 were males and 28,236 were females. The population within the age group of 0 to 6 years was 7,818. The total number of literates in Vrindavan was 42,917, which constituted 68.11% of the population with male literacy of 73.7% and female literacy of 61.2%. The effective literacy rate of the 7+ population of Vrindavan was 77.8%, of which the male literacy rate was 83.7% and the female literacy rate was 70.3%. The sex ratio is 812 females per 1000 males. The Scheduled Castes and Scheduled Tribes population was 6,294 and 18, respectively. As of 2011; more recent census data is not yet available on Wikipedia

Vrindavan lies in the cultural region of Braj.

== Culture and cityscape ==
=== Religious heritage ===
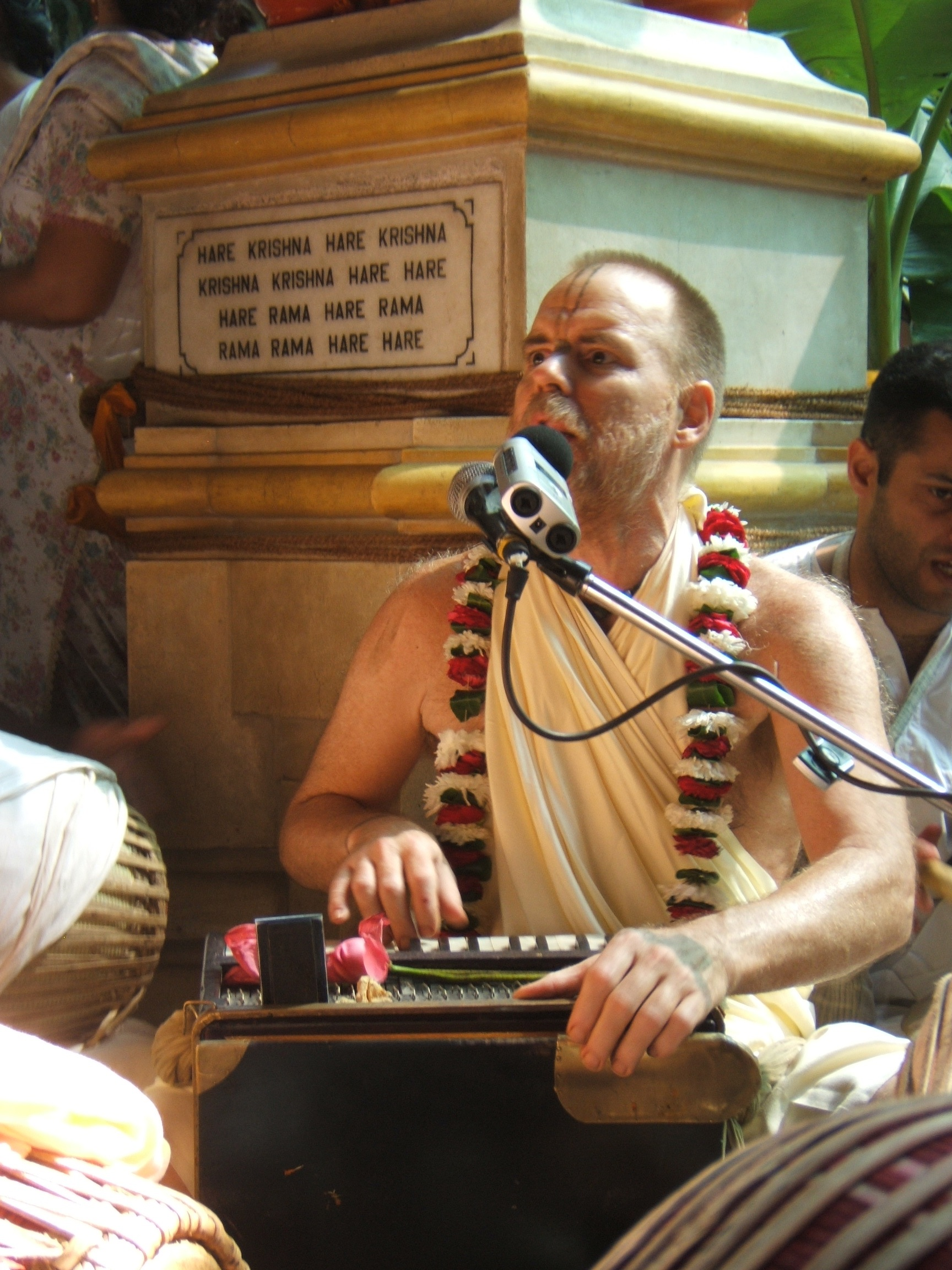
ISKCON devotee singing bhajan in Vrindavan

Vrindavan is considered to be a sacred place for Vaisnavism tradition of Hinduism. It is believed that Krishna spent part of his childhood in this city. The other prominent areas surrounding Vrindavan are Govardhana, Gokul, Nandgaon, Barsana, Mathura and Bhandirvan. Along with Vrindavan, all these places are considered to be the center of Radha and Krishna worship. Millions of devotees of Radha Krishna visit Vrindavan and its nearby areas every year to participate in a number of festivals. The common salutation or greetings used in Braj region by its residents is Radhe Radhe which is associated with the Goddess Radha or Hare Krishna which is associated with Krishna. Devotees of Krishna believe that he visits the town each night to adore Radha.

=== Temples ===
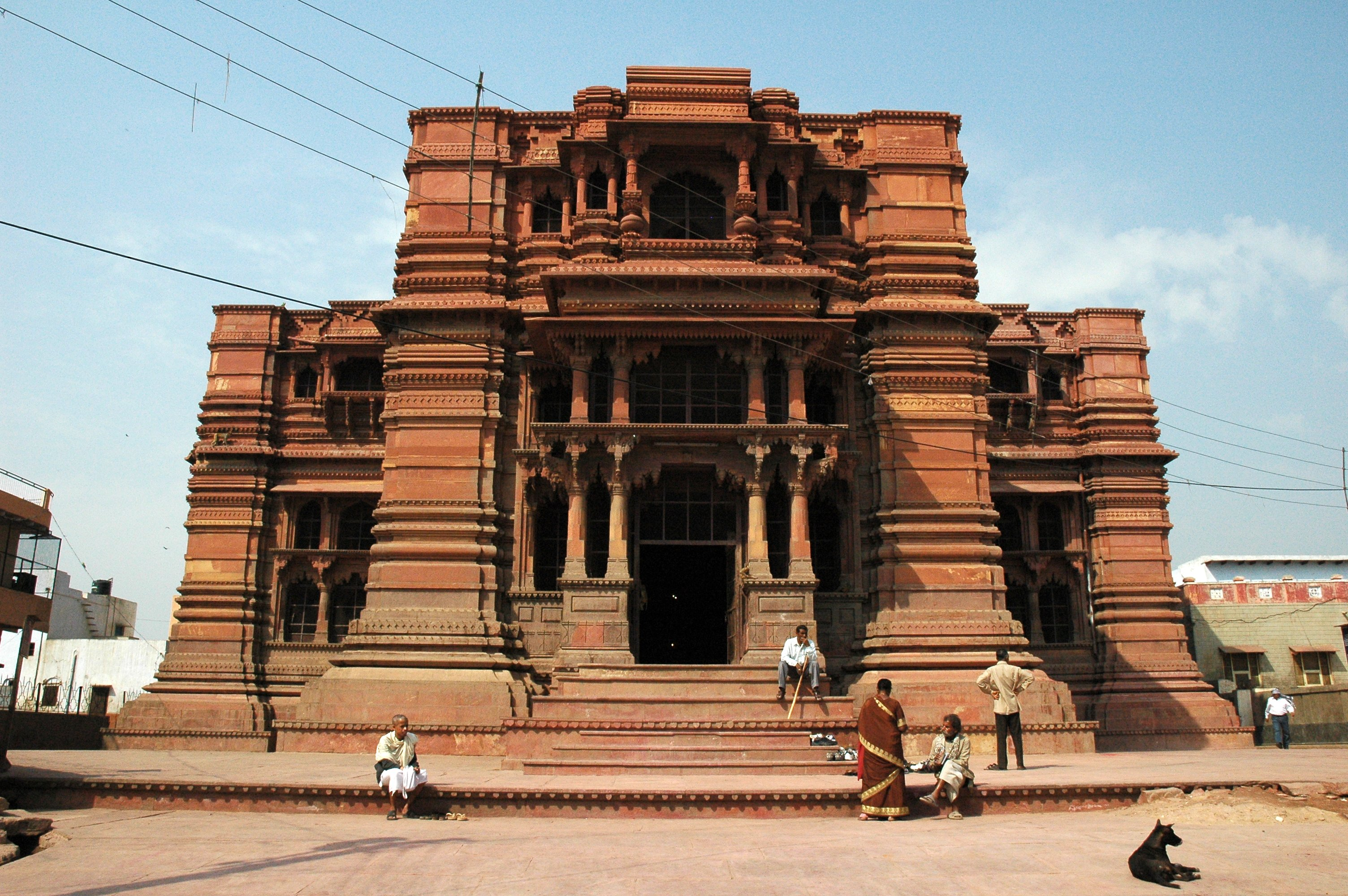
Govind Dev Temple, Vrindavan

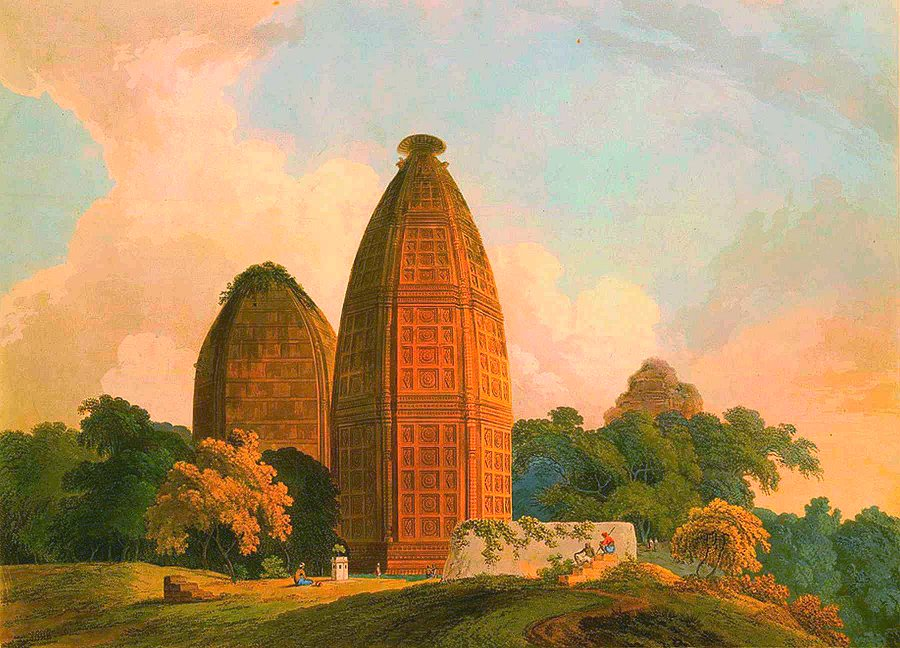
The 17th century Shri Radha Madan Mohan Temple was built by Raja Gopal Singhji of Karauli dynasty

Vrindavan, the land of Radha Krishna has about 5500 temples dedicated to them to showcase their divine pastimes. Some of the important pilgrimage sites are -

- Shri Radha Madan Mohan Temple, located near the Kalidah Ghat was built by Kapur Ram Das of Multan. One of the oldest temples in Vrindavan, it is closely associated with Chaitanya Mahaprabhu. The original deity of Madan Gopal was shifted from the shrine to Karauli in Rajasthan for safekeeping during Aurangzeb's rule. Today, a replica of the original (deity) is worshipped at the temple.
- Sri Radha Raman Mandir, constructed at the request of Gopala Bhatta Goswami and houses a saligram deity of Krishna as Radha Ramana, alongside Radha.
- Banke Bihari Temple, built in 1862 after the image of Banke-Bihari was discovered in Nidhivan by Swami Haridas.
- Radha Vallabh Temple is one of the ancient temples of Vrindavan. It was constructed in 1585 AD and was the first temple made up of red sandstones.
- Radha Damodar Temple is a Gaudiya Vaishnavism temple, which is dedicated to Radha Krishna and was constructed in 1542 CE.
- Sri Krishna-Balarama Temple was built by the International Society for Krishna Consciousness (ISKCON) in Raman-Reti. The principal deities of this temple are Krishna and Balaram, with Radha–Shyamasundar and Gaura-Nitai alongside. Adjoining the temple is the samadhi of A. C. Bhaktivedanta Swami Prabhupada, the founder of ISKCON, built in pure white marble.
- Prem Mandir, one of the ten largest Hindu temples in the world, is a spiritual complex situated on a 54-acre site on the outskirts of Vrindavan dedicated to divine love. The temple structure was established by spiritual guru Jagadguru Shri Kripalu Ji Maharaj. The main structure built in marble and figures of Krishna cover the main temple.
- Vrindavan Chandrodaya Mandir is housed in a modern geodesic structure with a traditional gopuram based on Khajuraho style of architecture. It is being built by one of the ISKCON factions based in Bangalore. At cost of ₹300 crore (US$31 million) it will be the tallest temple in the world on completion.
- Shri Rambag Mandir, Vrindavan Shri Rambag Mandir is a Ramanandi Sampradaya temple, which is the first and oldest Shri Ram Mandir. Made up of white sandstones and dedicated to Shri Ram Darbara, the temple was constructed in 1930.

== Festivals ==
=== Holi ===
Holi is among the most prominent festivals observed in Vrindavan. As part of the Braj region, Vrindavan holds a central place in the festival's mythology and traditions owing to its association with Krishna and Radha.

Unlike much of India, where Holi is observed as a single-day celebration, the festivities in the Braj region are extended, spanning a week or more, beginning from Rangbhari Ekadashi on the eleventh day of the bright fortnight of Phalguna.

A distinctive tradition observed in Vrindavan is Phoolon ki Holi (Holi of flowers), held at the Banke Bihari Temple, in which priests shower devotees with fresh flower petals — including marigold and rose — in place of coloured powder, accompanied by devotional singing. The nearby towns of Barsana and Nandgaon are known for Lathmar Holi, in which women playfully beat men with bamboo sticks in a traditional reenactment of Krishna's visits to Radha's village. Vrindavan's widows have also historically participated in Holi celebrations at local temples, a practice that has received wide attention.

== City of Widows ==
Vrindavan is also known as the "city of widows" due to the large number of widows who move into the town and surrounding area after losing their husbands. There are an estimated 15,000 to 20,000 widows. Many live in extreme poverty and spend time singing bhajan hymns at bhajanashrams, as documented in historian William Dalrymple's The Age of Kali (1998). An organisation called Guild of Service was formed to assist these deprived women and children. According to a government survey report, several homes for widows are run by the government and various NGOs.

== Culinary tradition ==
Vrindavan and Mathura, the twin cities associated with Krishna, are the main centres of Braj Cuisine. Vrindavan Peda, Vrindavan Dahi Arbi jhor, Vrindavan khichdi, Bedmi puri, Dubki Aloo jhor, Moong Dal cheela, Heeng Kachori are some of the famous cuisines popular in this religious city.

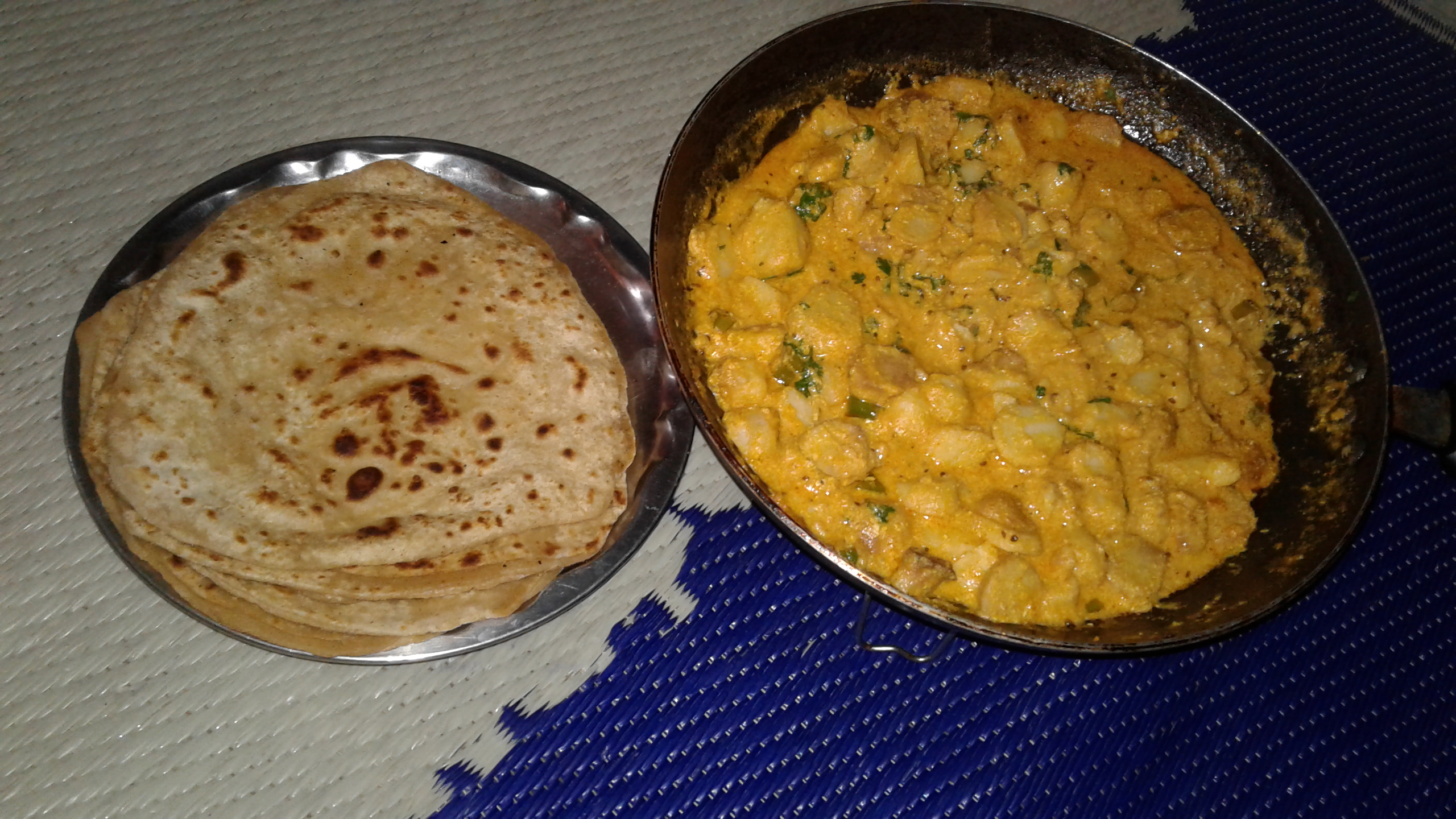
Vrindavan Dahi Arbi with paratha

== Transportation ==
=== Road ===
Vrindavan is well connected by roads and is connected to Delhi by National Highway (NH) 44 of the Golden Quadrilateral network. Earlier it was NH 2.

129 km from New Delhi

117 km from Gurgaon

54 km from Agra

9 km from Mathura

While in Vrindavan, battery-powered e-rickshaw are available for commuting within city limits.

=== Rail ===
- BDB/Vrindavan is on the Mathura-Vrindavan MG link.
- VRBD/Vrindavan Road is on the Agra-Delhi chord.

=== Air ===
The nearest Airports are Agra Airport which is 71.3 km away and New Delhi International Airport is 150 km away.

Noida International Airport in Jewar was inaugurated on 28 March 2026 by Prime Minister Narendra Modi, with commercial flights expected to commence subsequently.

== Gallery ==
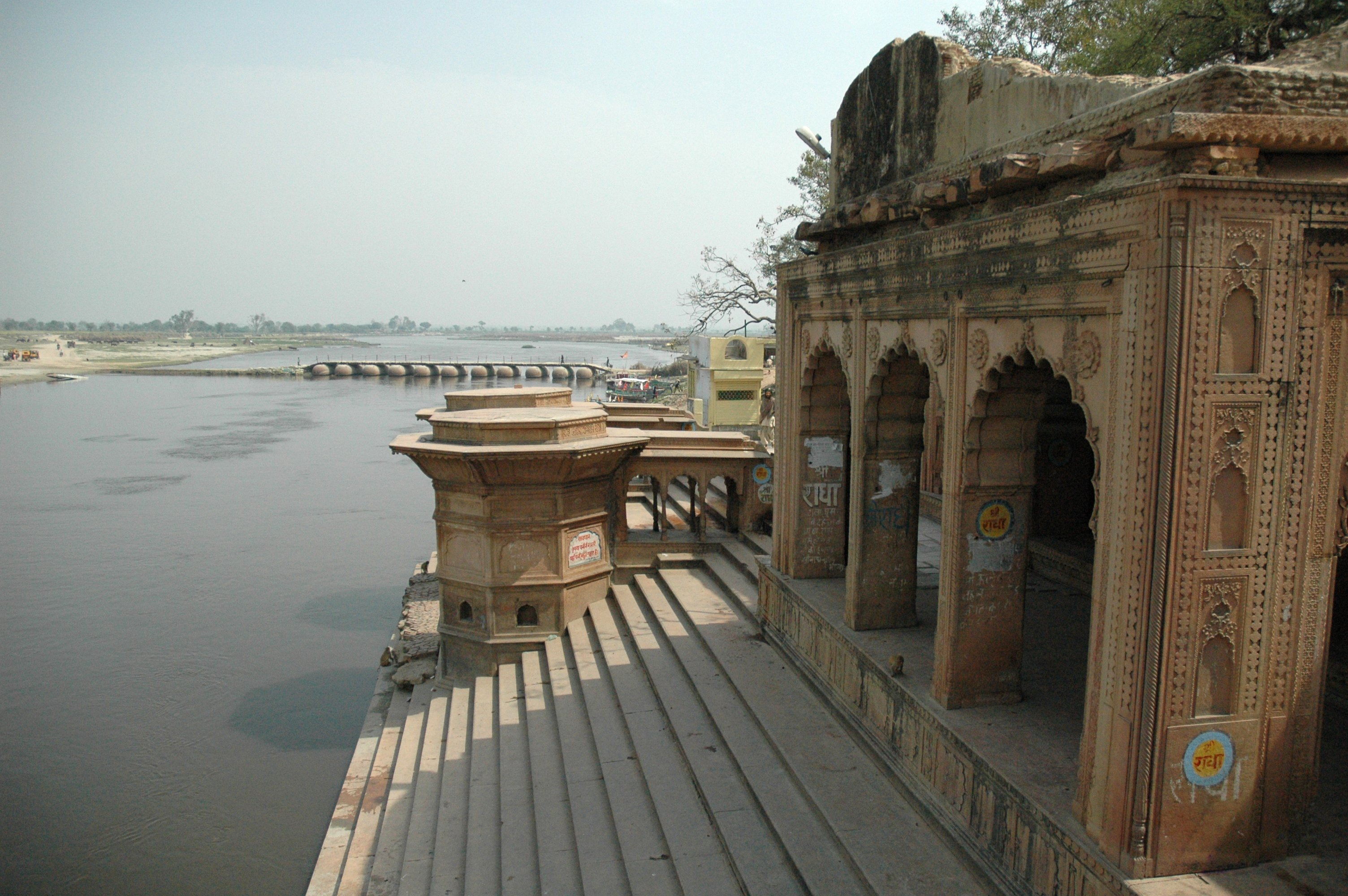
Keshi Ghat on banks of the Yamuna river

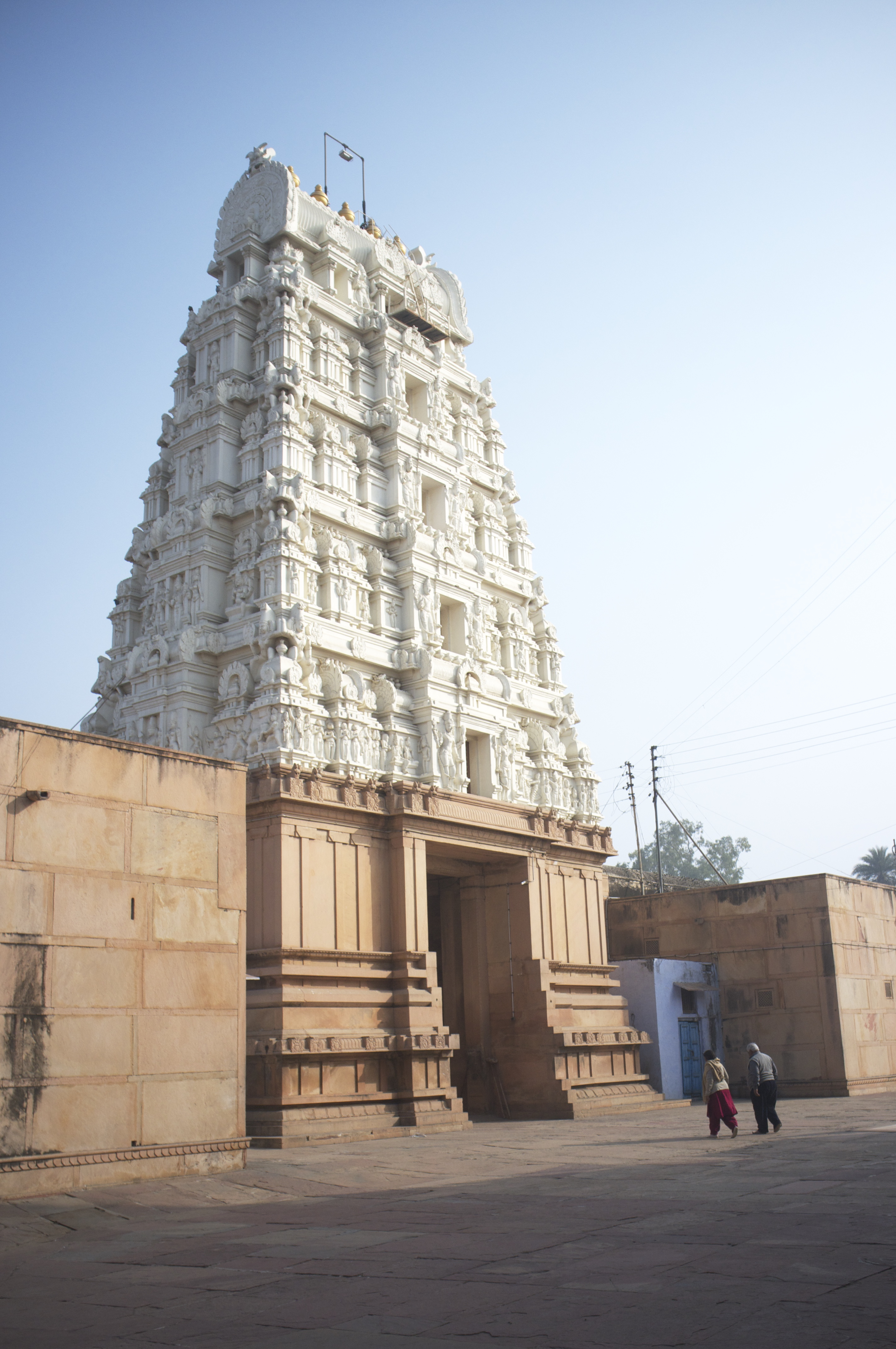
Rangaji Temple of Vrindavan

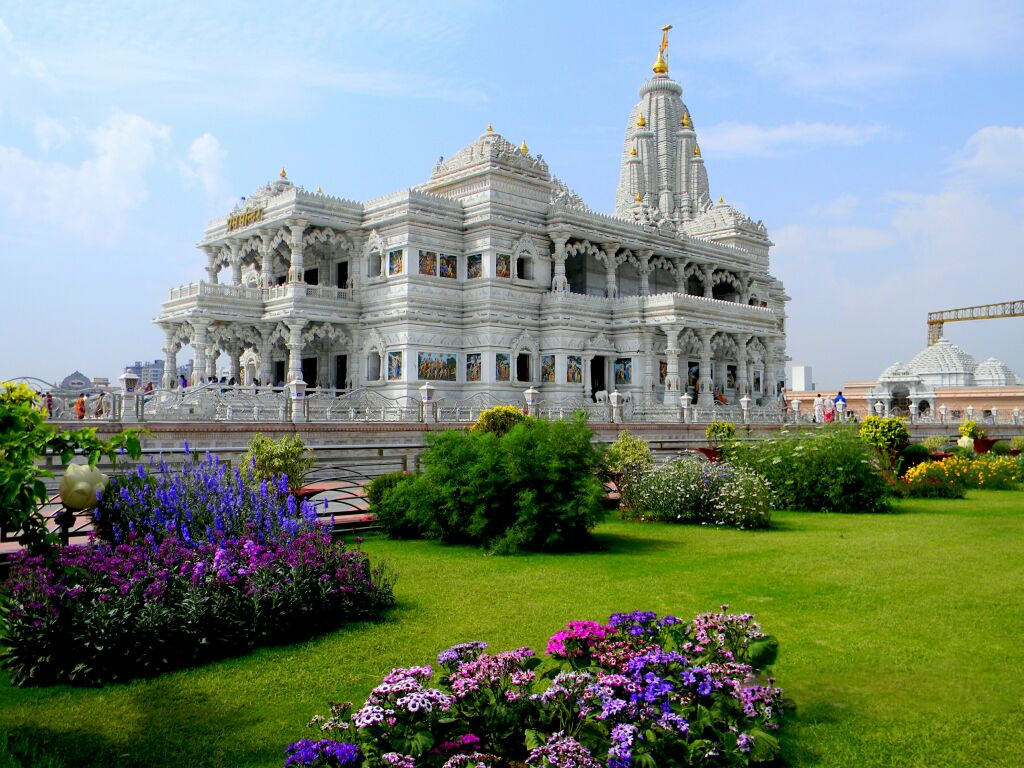
Prem Mandir, Vrindavan

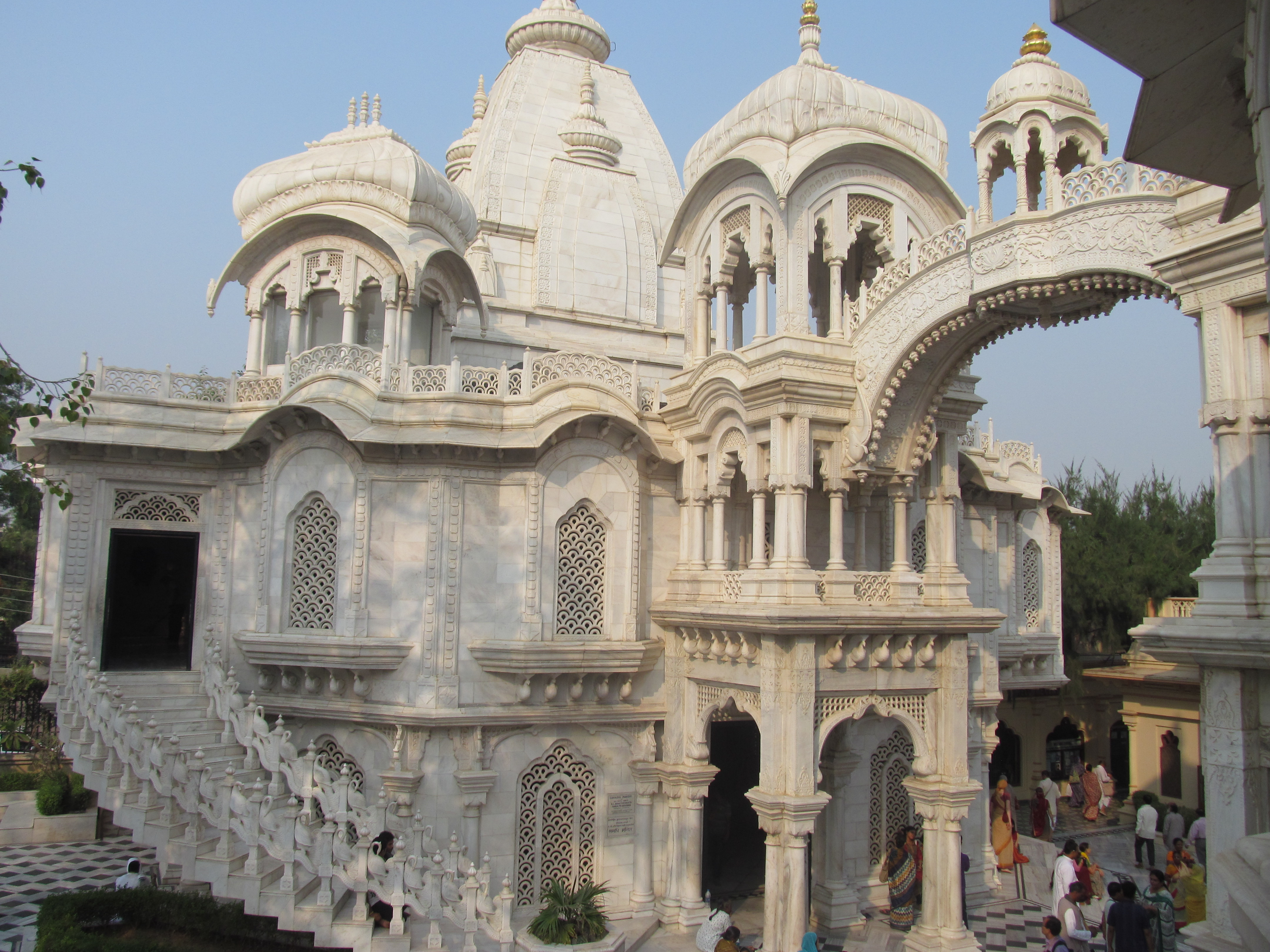
Krishna Balaram Mandir

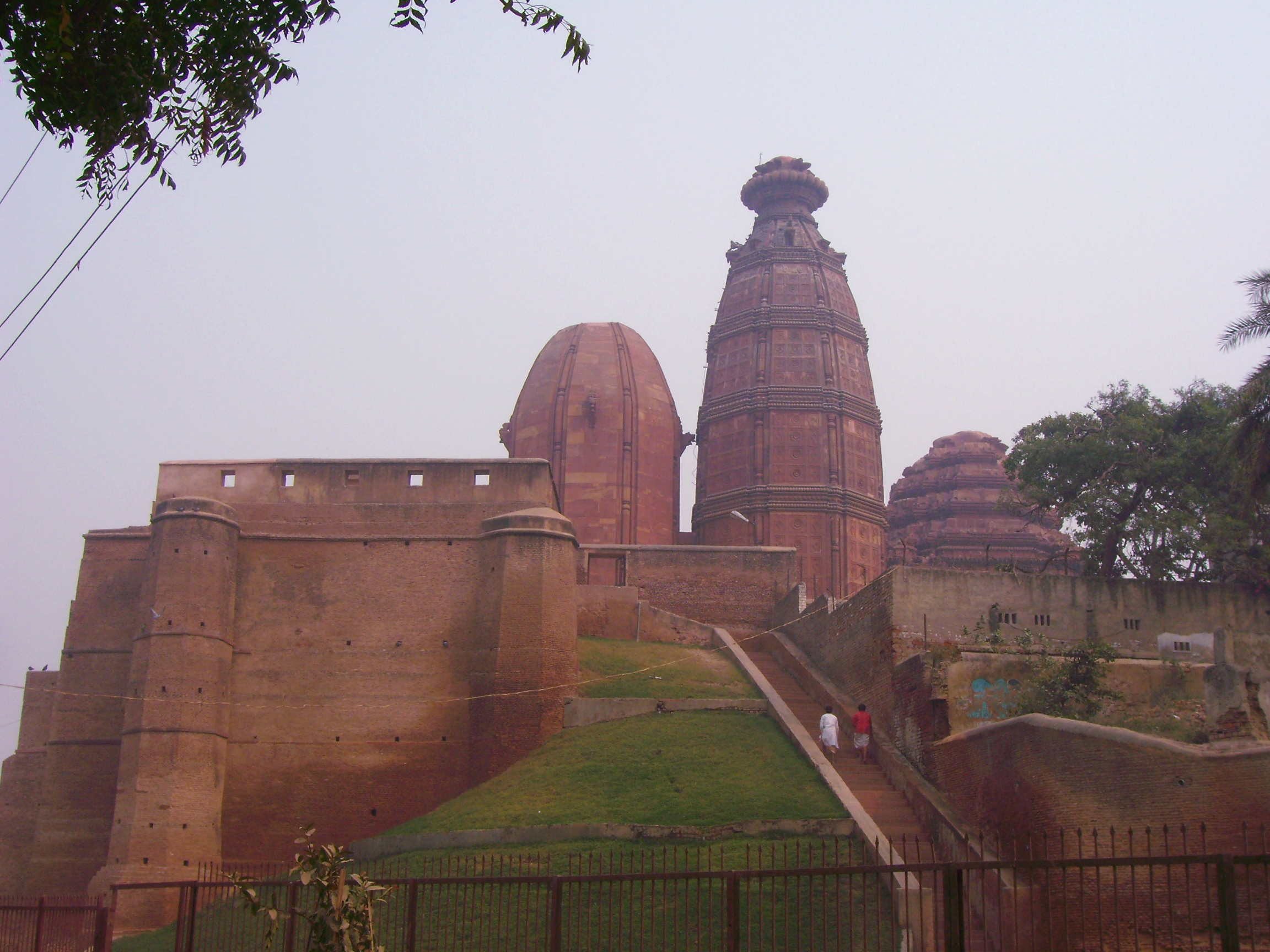
Radha Madan Mohan Temple, Vrindavan

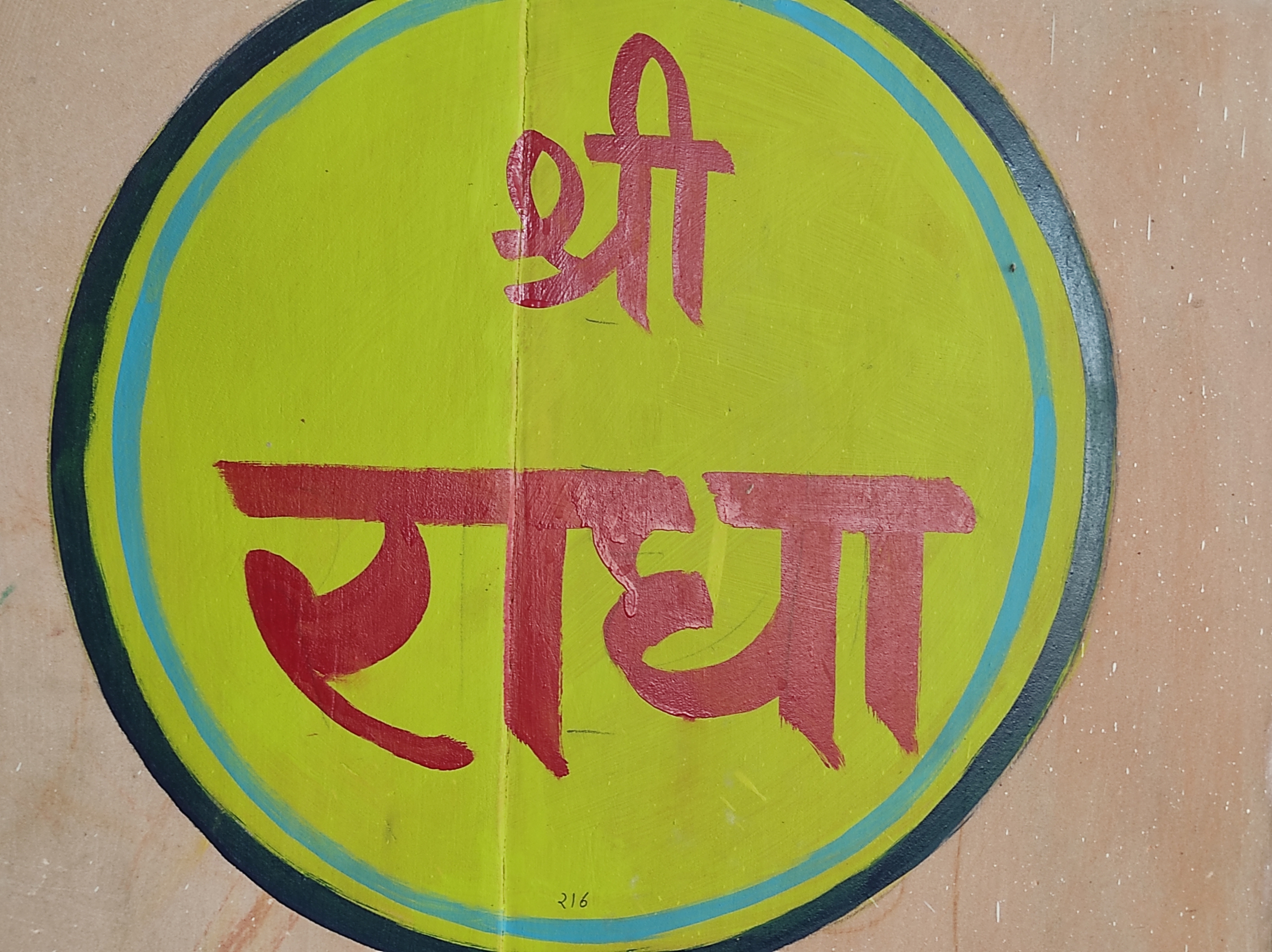
Wall art of the name Radha

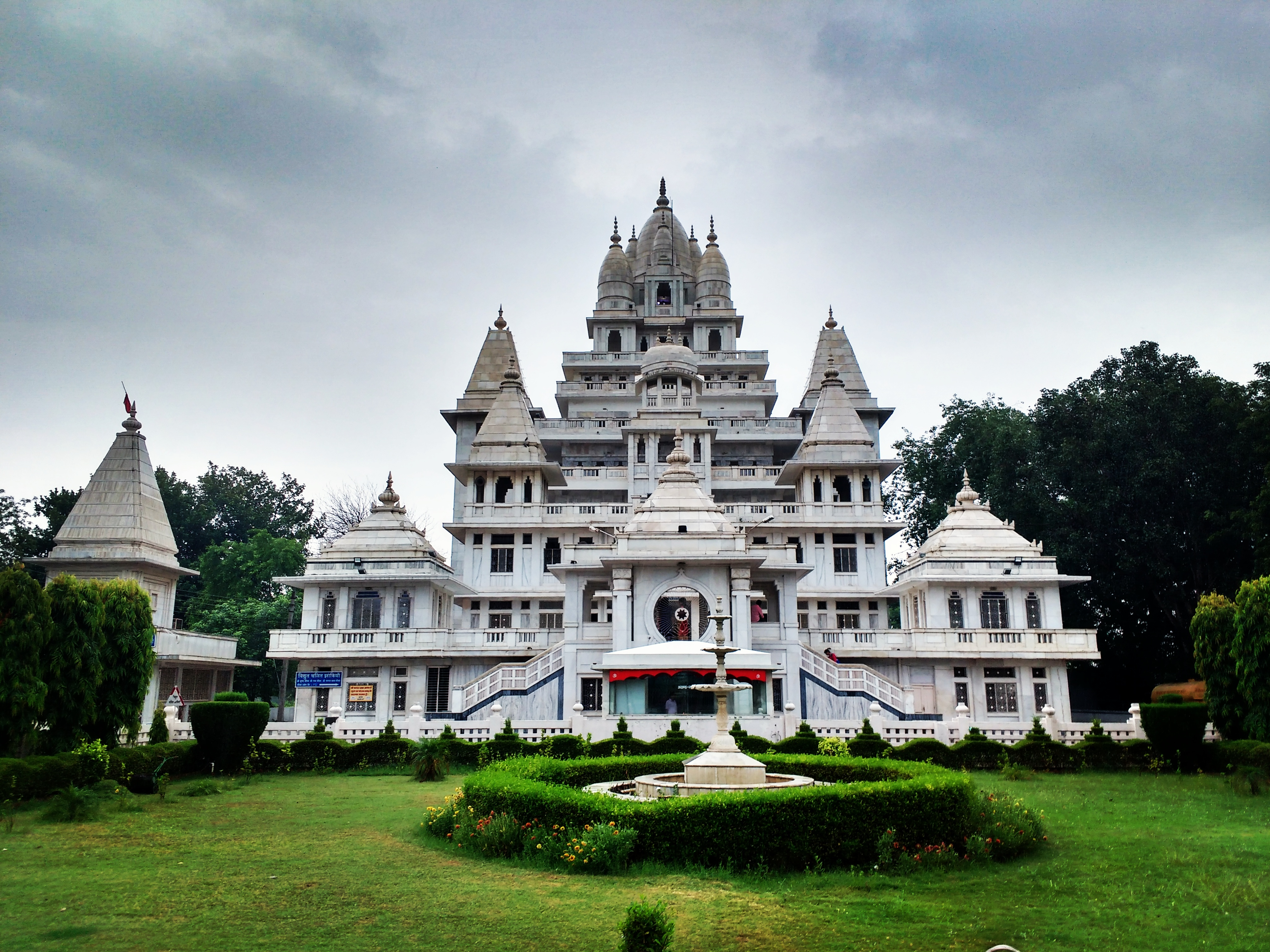
Pagal Baba Temple

== Selected publications ==
- Mathura A District Memoir, Frederic Growse, 1882 (englisch)
- Krishna’s Playground: Vrindavan in the 21st Century, John Stratton Hawley, OUP India, 2019 (englisch) ISBN 978-0190-9913-4-0

== See also ==
- Barsana
- Bhandirvan
- Gokul
- Goverdhan
- Mathura
- Nandgaon
- Phulhar
- Radha Kund
