= Prem Mandir, Vrindavan =

Hindu temple dedicated to Radha Krishna and Sita Rama

Prem Mandir
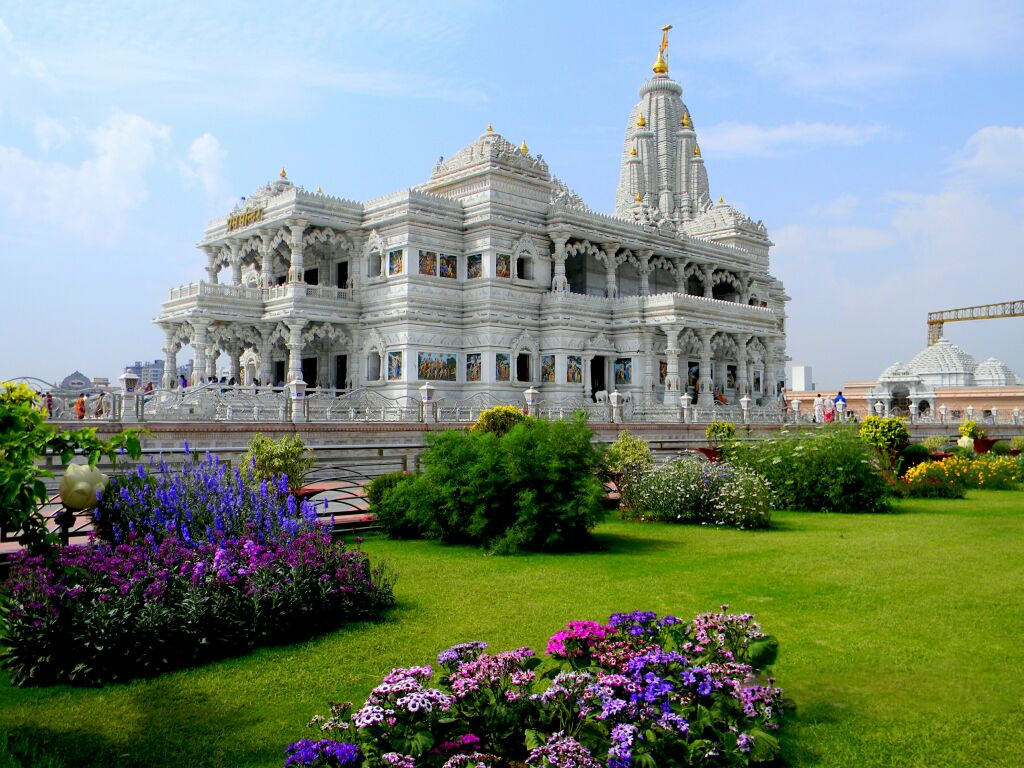
- Prem Mandir

- Location in Uttar Pradesh

Religion
- Affiliation: Hinduism
- District: Mathura
- Deity: Radha Krishna, Sita Rama
- Festivals: Janmashtami, Radhastami

Location
- Location: Vrindavan
- State: Uttar Pradesh
- Country: India
- Coordinates: 27.5724569°N 77.6724919°E

Architecture
- Type: Rajasthani Somnath Gujarati architecture
- Creator: Kripalu Maharaj
- Completed: 17 February 2012
- Elevation: 169.78 m (557 ft)

Website
- https://premmandir.org.in/

Prem Mandir is a Hindu temple in Vrindavan, Mathura district, Western Uttar Pradesh, India. The temple was established by Kripalu Maharaj. The complex is spread across a 22-hectare (55-acre) site on the outskirts of Vrindavan. It is dedicated to Radha Krishna and Sita Ram. Radha Krishna are on the first level and Sita Ram are on the second level. To the right of Sita Ram's murti, a special tribute is offered to the four original Jagadgurus who preceded Jagadguru Kripalu Maharaj.

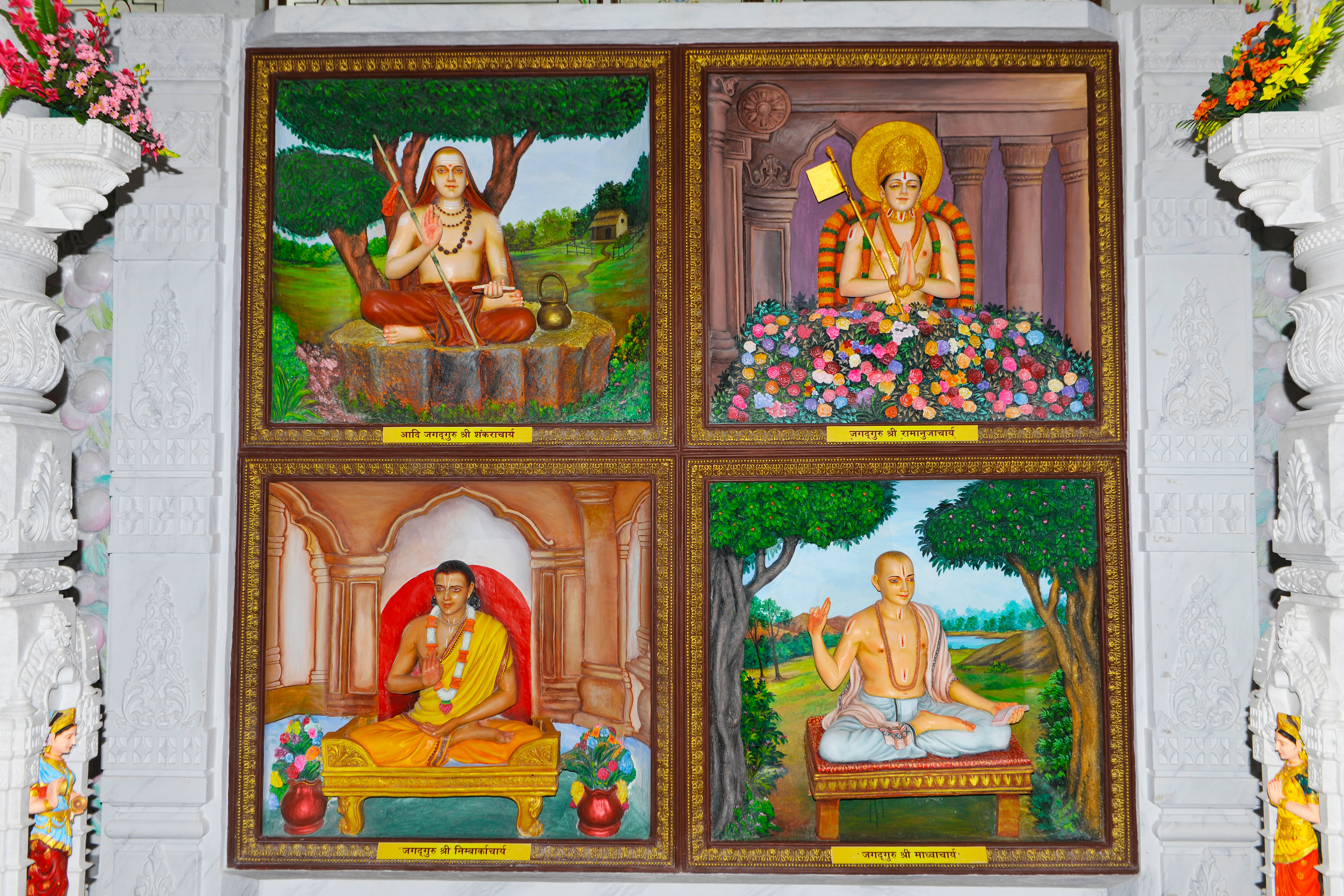
All Jagadgurus honoured in Prem Mandir

== Inauguration and landscape ==
The temple's construction began in January 2001 and the inauguration ceremony took place from 15 to 17 February 2012. The temple was opened to the public on 17 February. The cost was 150 crore rupees ($23 million). On 19 March 2026, President of India Droupadi Murmu, accompanied by the Governor of Uttar Pradesh, Anandiben Patel, visited Prem Mandir and performed aarti during a three-day visit to Uttar Pradesh. The presiding deity are Shri Radha Govind (Radha Krishna) and Shri Sita Ram. A 6,800 square metres (73,000 sq ft), pillar-less, dome shaped satsang hall, next to the Prem Mandir, accommodates 25,000 people at a time.

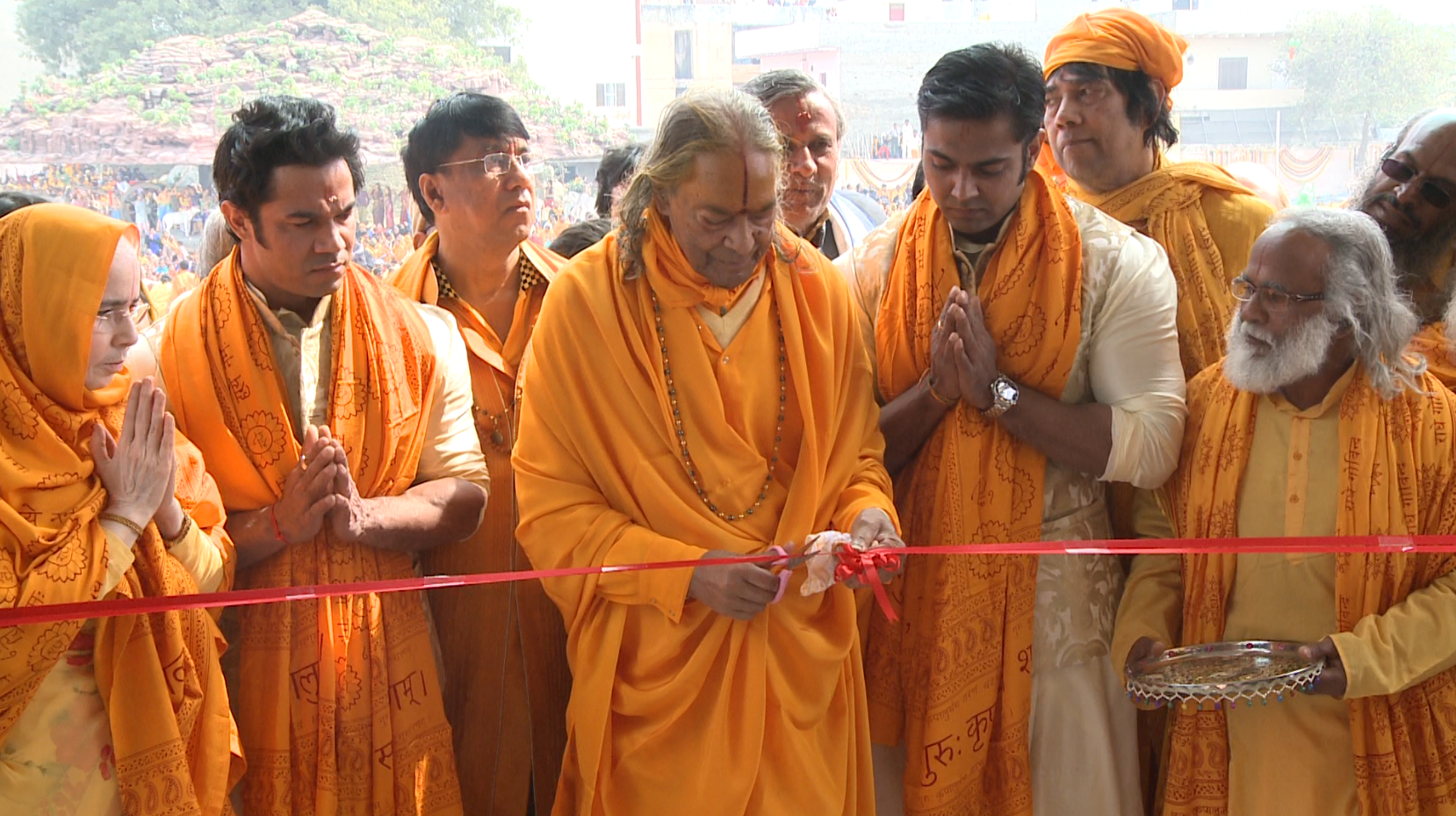
Prem Mandir being inaugurated by its founder Jagadguru Shri Kripalu Ji Maharaj in 2012

Surrounded by beautiful gardens and fountains, the temple complex has life-size depictions of four leelas of Shri Krishna – Jhulan leela, Govardhan leela, Raas leela and Kaliya Naag leela. Different Leelas of Shri Krishna and Rasik saints are depicted all over the wall of the main temple.

It is sister temple of Bhakti Mandir which was opened in 2005 and another sister temple which is known as Kirti Mandir, Barsana opened in 2019.

== History architecture and design ==
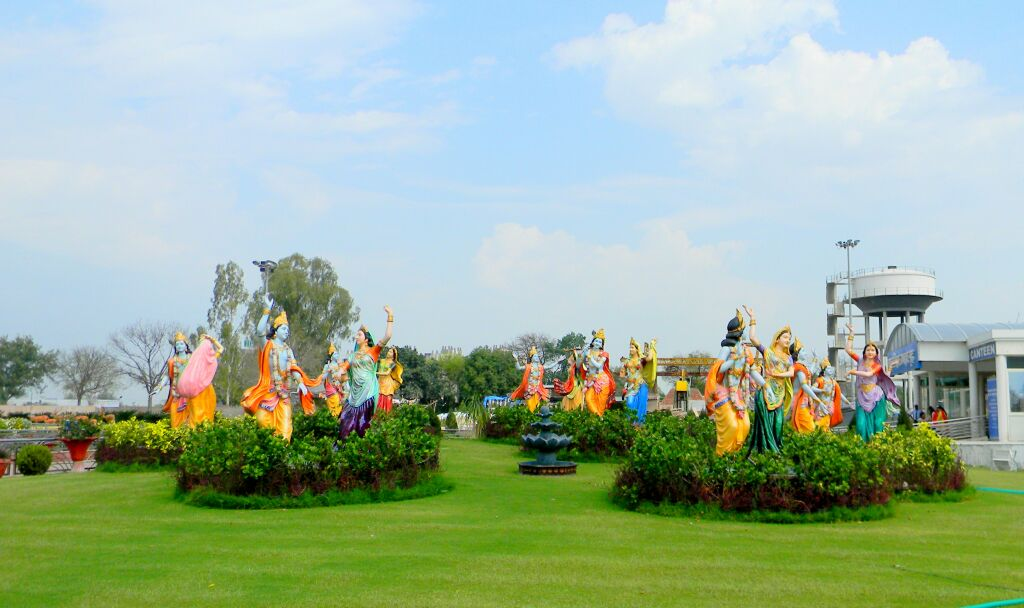
Rasa Lila by Krishna, in Prem Mandir Vrindavan

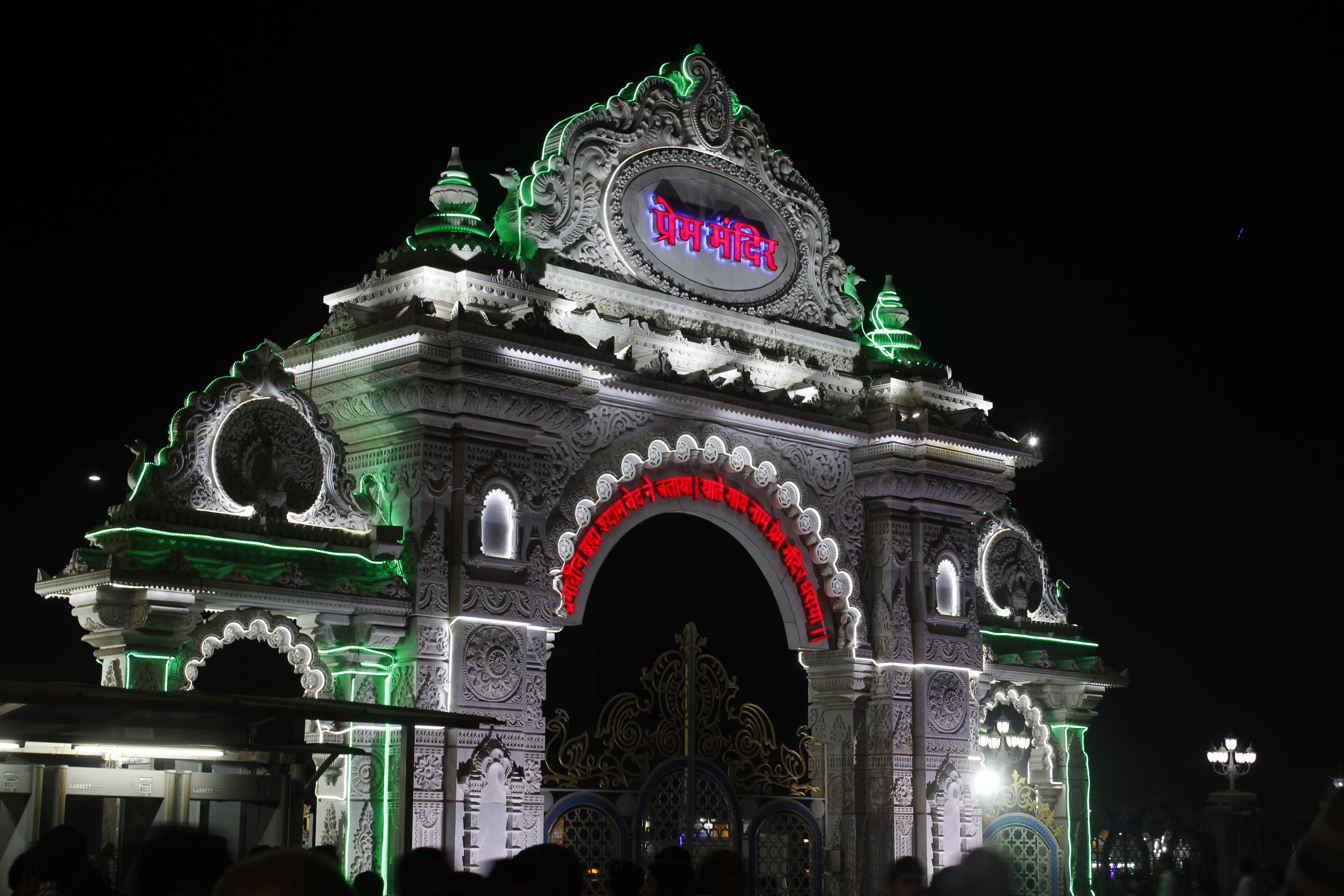
Prem Mandir Vrindavan at night, entrance gate

The foundation stone was laid by Jagadguru Shri Kripalu Ji Maharaj in the presence of thousand devotees on 14 January 2001. The structure took around 12 years to construct, involving around 1000 artisans.

The Vrindavan site was developed by Kripalu Ji Maharaj, whose main ashram was in Vrindavan.

== Events ==
- Janmashtami
- Radhastami

== See also ==
- Vrindavan Chandrodaya Mandir
- Banke Bihari Temple
- Radha Rani Temple
- Radha Raman Temple
- Krishna Balaram Mandir
- Radha Damodar Temple, Vrindavan
- Radha Madan Mohan Temple, Vrindavan
