= Kripalu Dham Mangarh, Uttar Pradesh =

Village in Pratapgarh, Uttar Pradesh, India

Kripalu Dham Mangarh (formerly Mangarh) is a village in Pratapgarh district (located between Ayodhya and Prayag) in the north Indian state of Uttar Pradesh. In 2023, the Government of Uttar Pradesh changed the name of the village to Kripalu Dham Mangarh from Mangarh. It is the birthplace of Kripalu Maharaj.

== Temples ==
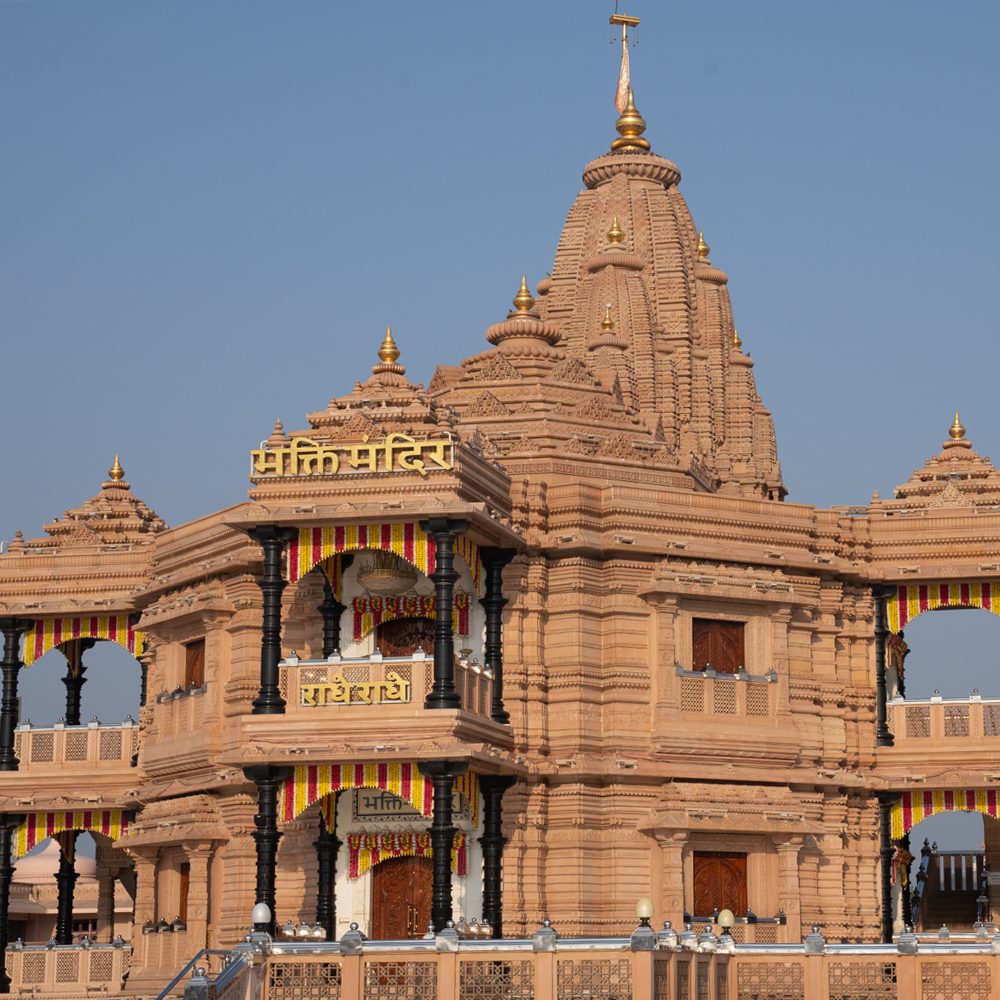

Mangarh is home to two temples - Bhakti Mandir and Guru Dham Bhakti Mandir.

== Transportation ==
=== Rail ===
Kunda Harnamganj, station code KHNM, is the nearest railway station.
