= Jagadguru =

Title used in Hinduism

Jagadguru, literally meaning "guru for the whole world", is a honorific title used in traditional Hinduism.

== Jagadguru as title ==
The title "Jagadguru Ramanandacharya" is used in the lineage of Ramananda, founder of Ramanandi Sampradaya. Rambhadracharya, the founder of Tulsi Peeth within the Ramanandi Sampradaya, was conferred the title "Jagadguru Ramanandacharya" by the Kashi Vidvat Parishad on 24 June 1988.

The Kashi Vidvat Parishad conferred the title of Jagadguru upon Jagadguru Kripalu Ji Maharaj in 1957, claiming him to be the foremost spiritual master of the age.
