= Radha Krishna =

Divine couple in Hinduism

- God and Goddess of Love, Purusha and Mūlaprakriti, Avatar of Lakshmi Narayana, Supreme Deities in Krishnaism
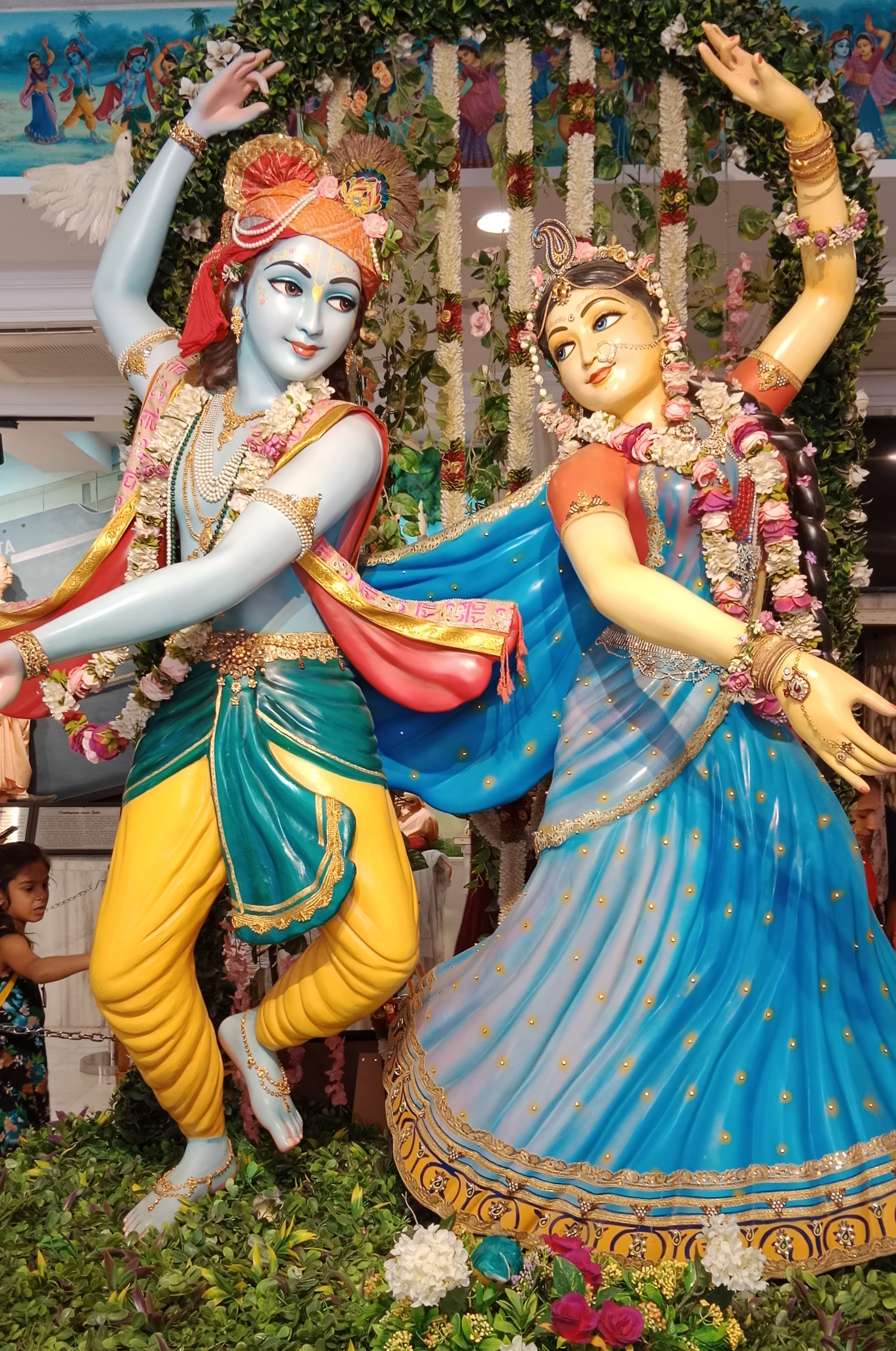
- Idols of Radha Krishna at ISKCON Temple, Vrindavan
- Other names: Madhavi Madhava; Keshavi Keshava; Shyamā Shyama; Kishori Kishora; Gopi Gopinatha; Gaurangi Gauranga
- Devanagari: राधाकृष्ण
- Sanskrit transliteration: rādhā-kṛṣṇa
- Venerated in: Nimbarka Sampradaya; Gaudiya Vaishnavism; Pushtimarg; Radha Vallabha Sampradaya; Mahanam Sampradaya; Pranami Sampradaya; Manipuri Vaishnavism; Swaminarayan Sampradaya; Vaishnava-Sahajiya; Haridasi Sampradaya
- Affiliation: Vaishnavism; Krishnaism; Lakshmi Narayana
- Abode: Goloka; Vaikuntha; Vrindavan; Barsana
- Mantra: Oṃ Rādhā Kṛṣṇabhyam Namaḥ; Oṃ Klīṃ Rādhā Kṛṣṇāya Namaḥ; Radhe Radhe; Hare Krishna
- Texts: Brahmavaivarta Purana; Padma Purana; Shiva Purana; Skanda Purana; Devi-Bhagavata Purana; Naradiya Purana; Gopala Tapani Upanishad; Brahma Samhita; Chaitanya Charitamrita; Garga Samhita; Radha Tantra; Gita Govinda
- Festivals: Holi; Lathmar Holi; Sharad Purnima; Karthik Purnima; Janmashtami; Radhashtami; Gopashtami; Jhulan Purnima

Radha-Krishna (IAST rādhā-kṛṣṇa, Sanskrit: राधा कृष्ण) is the combined form of the Hindu god Krishna with his chief consort and shakti Radha. They are regarded as the feminine as well as the masculine realities of God, in several Krishnaite traditions of Vaishnavism.

In Krishnaism, Krishna is referred to as Svayam Bhagavan and Radha is illustrated as the primeval potency of the three main potencies of God, Hladini (immense spiritual bliss), Sandhini (eternality), and Samvit (existential consciousness), of which Radha is an embodiment of the feeling of love towards Krishna (Hladini).

With Krishna, Radha is acknowledged as the Supreme Goddess. Krishna is said to be satiated only by devotional service in loving servitude, personified by Radha. Various devotees worship her to attain Krishna via her. Radha is also depicted to be Krishna himself, split into two for the purpose of his enjoyment. As per scriptures, Radha is considered as the complete incarnation of Mahalakshmi.

It is believed that Krishna enchants the world, but Radha enchants even him. Therefore, she is the supreme goddess of all, and together they are called Radha-Krishna. In many Vaishnava sections, Radha Krishna are often identified as the avatars of Lakshmi Narayana.

== Names and epithets ==
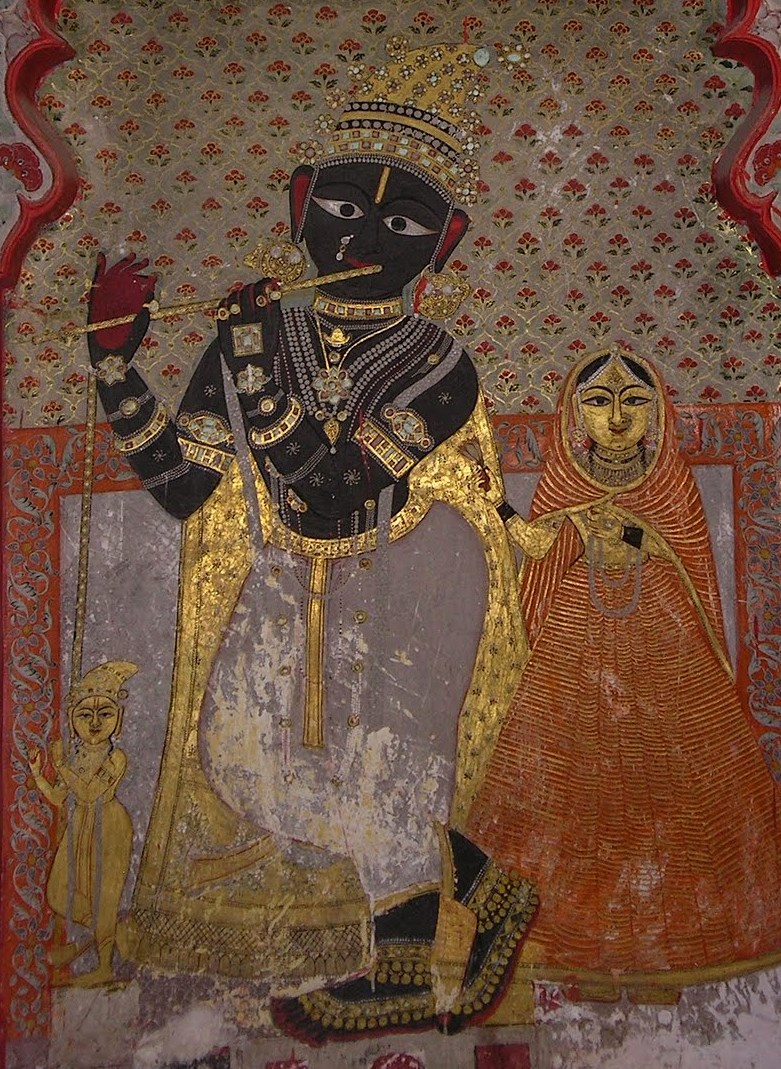
14th-century CE fresco of Radha Krishna in Udaipur, Rajasthan

Radha Krishna can be broken into two: Krishna (Devanagari: कृष्ण), the incarnation of Vishnu, which means, "all attractive" or "dark blue", and his shakti Radha (Devanagari: राधा), the incarnation of Lakshmi, which means "the pleasing one".

Many significant epithets accorded to Krishna including - Radha Ramana and Radha Vallabh, which means "the lover and the beloved of Radha" are directly derived from the name of his consort, Radha. Similarly, epithets of Radha including - Krishna Kanta, which means "the consort of Krishna" and Krishna Vallabha, which means "the eternal companion of Krishna", are directly associated with the name of Krishna.

== Literature ==
Radha Krishna's first literary mention was found in King Hala's Prakrit text Gatha Saptasati which is composed of 700 verses and was written in the 1st century CE. Later, the popular Gita Govinda written by Jayadeva in 12th century CE widely depicted Radha and Krishna as a couple.

According to scriptures like Brahma Vaivarta Purana and Garga Samhita, Radha-Krishna are the supreme deities. Content of both the scriptures are majorly based on the divine pastimes of Radha Krishna in Vrindavan and Goloka. The other relevant texts mentioning Radha Krishna are the Radhopnishad, Radhika Tapani Upanishad, Gopala Tapani Upanishad, Shiva Purana, Brahmanda Purana, Skanda Purana, Padma Purana, Matsya Purana, Devi-Bhagavata Purana, Narad Purana, Narada Pancharatra, Radha Tantra, Brahma Samhita and Chaitanya Charitamrita. Radha is also indirectly mentioned in Bhagavata Purana along with Krishna under many different names like "Aradhika" and "Gopi". Adi Shankracharya also mentioned Radha under the name of Radhika in his work called "Achyuta Ashtakam" which is dedicated to the Achyuta form of Krishna.

The devotional works of Jayadeva, Nimbarkacharya, Rasik saints like Chaitanya Mahaprabhu along with his six disciple goswamis, Bhakti poet-saints Narsinh Mehta, Vidyapati, Chandidas, Meera Bai, Surdas and Swami Haridas played pivotal role in spreading devotion to the divine couple.

According to several Hindu denominations including Gaudiya Vaishnavism, Nimbarka Sampradaya, Pushtimarg, and Swaminarayan Sampradaya, it is believed that Radha is not just one cowherd maiden, but the origin of all the Ashtasakhi, Gopis, or divine personalities that participate in the rasa dance.

== Shakti and Shaktiman ==
The common derivation of shakti and shaktiman, that is, female and male principle in a god implies that shakti and shaktiman are the same. Each and every god has its partner, or Shakti, and without this Shakti, is sometimes viewed being without essential power. It is a not uncommon feature of Hinduism when worship of a pair rather than one personality constitutes worship of God, such is worship of Radha Krishna. Traditions worshiping Krishna, as svayam bhagavan, who is male, include reference and veneration to his Radha, who is worshiped as supreme. A view that exists of orthodox Krishnaism, the sect of the worship of Krishna, is that Radha is shakti and Krishna is shaktiman and are always found without any tinge of materialistic attributes or cause.

== Theology and philosophy ==
From the Vaishnava point of view the divine feminine energy (shakti) implies a divine source of energy, God or shaktiman. "Sita relates to Rama; Lakshmi belongs to Narayana; Radha has her Krishna." As Krishna is believed to be the source of all manifestations of God, "Radha, his consort, is the original source of all shaktis" or feminine manifestation of divine energy.

The first theologo-philosophical justification for worshiping Radha-Krishna was given by Nimbarkacharya, a founder of the Nimbarka Sampradaya in 12th or 13th century CE. In accordance with the Sahitya Akademi Encyclopaedia, he more than any other acharyas gave Radha a place as a deity.

A number of interpretations according to traditions possess a common root of personalism in the understanding of worship. Specifically Chaitanyaite Gaudiya Vaishnava doctrine and mission is fiercely "personalistic," proclaiming the supremacy of Krishna, the identification of Chaitanya as Radha-Krishna, the reality and eternality of individual selves, and a method for approaching the absolute reality and the Deity as a person first and foremost.

Jiva Goswami in his Priti Sandarbha states that each of the Gopis exhibits a different level of intensity of passion, among which Radha's is the greatest.

In his famous dialogs Ramananda Raya describes Radha to Chaitanya and quotes, among other texts, a verse from Chaitanya Charitamrta 2.8.100, before he goes on to describe her role in the pastimes of Vrindavana.

The central pivot point of the theology is related to the word rasa. The theological use of the word can be found very early, about two thousand years before the Nimbarka or Chaitanya schools, in a phrase that the tradition frequently quotes: "Truly, the Lord is rasa" (raso vai sah) from the Brahma sutras. This statement expresses the view that God is the one who enjoys the ultimate rasa or spiritual rapture, emotions.

According to Swami Krishnananda, between the two incarnations of Vishnu, Rama signifies human perfection, whereas Krishna represents divine perfection; Rama establishes the ideals of "discipline, law, conduct and righteousness" and hence is called Maryada-Purushottama, and Krishna represents "God playing the divine sport of his transcendent and supermental magnificence, glory and perfection in the world of mortals", and hence is called Lila-Purushottama.

== In traditions ==
Radha Krishna are worshiped in the following Hindu denominations:

=== Bhagavata ===
In Vedic and Puranic literature, Radha and other forms of the root word Radh have meaning of ‘perfection’, ‘success’ and even ‘wealth’. Lord of Success, Indra was referred to as Radhaspati. In references to Mahavishnu as the Lord of Fortune and freely used by Jayadeva as Jaya Jayadeva Hare – the victorious Hari, and ‘Radhaspati’ all found in many places. The word Radha occurs in the Atharva Veda, Taittiriya Brahmana and Taittiriya Samhita.

Charlotte Vaudeville, in the article Evolution of Love Symbolism in Bhagavatism draws some parallel to Nappinnai, appearing in Godha's magnum opus Thiruppavai and in Nammalwar's references to Nappinnani, the daughter-in-law of Nandagopa. Nappinnai is believed to be the source of Radha's conception in Prakrit and Sanskrit literature although their characteristic relations with Krishna are different. In the ritual dance called Kuravai, Krishna dances with his wife Nappinnai. "It is a complex relationship, for the devotee is the ‘same as and yet different from’ the Lord, and so even in the joy of union there is the pain of separation. Indeed, the highest form of devotion, according to Yamunacarya, comes not in union but after the union, in the ‘fear of new separation’".

Yasastilaka Champukavya (959 CE) and Gaha Sattasai make references to Radha and Krishna well before Jayadeva's period. There are elaborate references of Radha and Krishna in Brahma Vaivarta Purana, Garga Samhita and Padma Purana.

=== Gaudiya Vaishnava Sampradaya ===
Gaudiya Vaishnava, as the name suggests, usually refers to the region of Bengal. Early Bengali literature gives a vivid description of the depiction and evolution of understanding of Radha and Krishna.

In this Bengali tradition, metaphysical status and Radha-worship are considered to have been established by Krsnadasa in his Chaitanya Charitamrta, where he represents the doctrine that prevailed among the Vrindavan Caitanyaites following Caitanya's demise in 1533. It is believed that Krishna, desiring to experience fully what it is like to love Krishna as Radha does, appeared as Caitanya Mahaprabhu. And what Radha (appearing as Caitanya) does in her longing for Krishna is to chant his names. One of the self manifested Deities established by Gopala Bhatta Goswami is called Radha Ramana. Since Chaityana Mahaprabhu is seen as combined form of Radha-Krishna, Radha Ramana is viewed not only as Krishna, but as a unified form of Radha-Krishna. And worship in his temple, located in the centre of Vrindavana is a perpetual daily affair, involving several prescribed events throughout the day, with the goal of being theoretical and remote, but with aspiration of the possibility to attend and associate directly with Radha and Krishna.

==== Manipuri Vaishnavism ====
The Manipuri Vaishnavism is a regional variant of Gaudiya Vaishnavism with a culture-forming role among the Meitei people in the north-eastern Indian state of Manipur. There, after a short period of Ramaism penetration, Gaudiya Vaishnavism spread in the early 18th century, especially from beginning its second quarter. Raja Gharib Nawaz (Pamheiba) under the influence of Natottama Thakura's disciples was initiated into the Chaitanya tradition with worship of Radha-Krishna as the supreme deity. Every village there has a Thakur-ghat and a temple. Manipuri Raas Leela and other dances are a feature of the regional folk and religious tradition and often, for example, a female dancer will portray both Krishna and his consort, Radha, in the same piece.

=== Haridasi Sampradaya ===
The Haridasi tradition was founded by Vrindavan saint and musician, Swami Haridas, in the 16th century in Vrindavan. The theology of Haridasi tradition revolves around the divine couple Radha Krishna and the cowherd maidens who serve them. In Haridasi tradition, Radha is considered as the supreme deity, even above Krishna.

=== Nimbarka Sampradaya ===
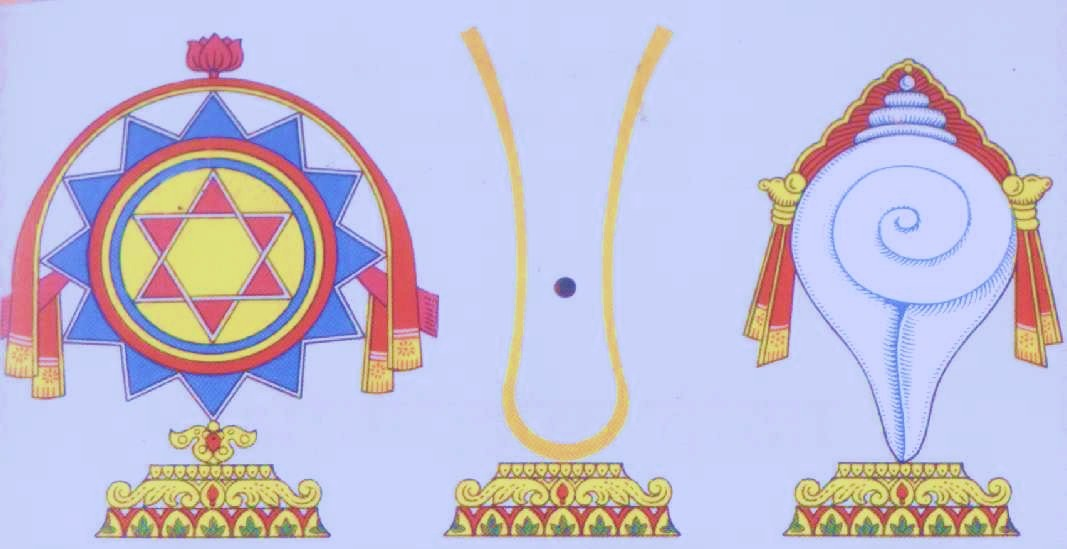
The Shankha-Chakra-Tilaka emblems of the Sri Nimbarka Sampradaya.

The Nimbarka Sampradaya worship the youthful form of Krishna, alone or with his consort Radha, is one of the earliest dating at least to the 12th century CE, just as Rudra Sampradaya does. According to Nimbarkacharya, a founder of the sampradaya, Radha is the eternal consort and wedded wife of Krishna, who lives forever with him in Goloka. Nimbarka's philosophical position is dualistic monism and he centered all his devotion to Krishna and his consort Radha.

The Nimbarka Sampradaya is one of the four bona fide Vaishnavite traditions. Lack of evidence due to the destruction of Mathura and Vrindavan in the 13th century and 14th century has meant that the true dates and origins of this tradition are shrouded in mystery and await investigation.

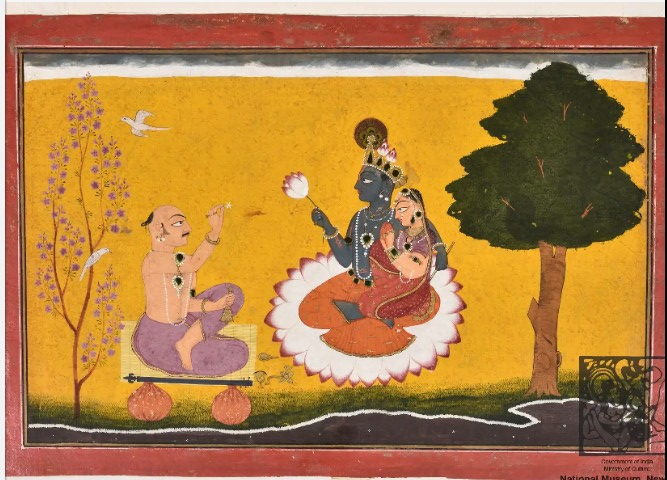
Jayadeva worshipping of Radha Krishna.

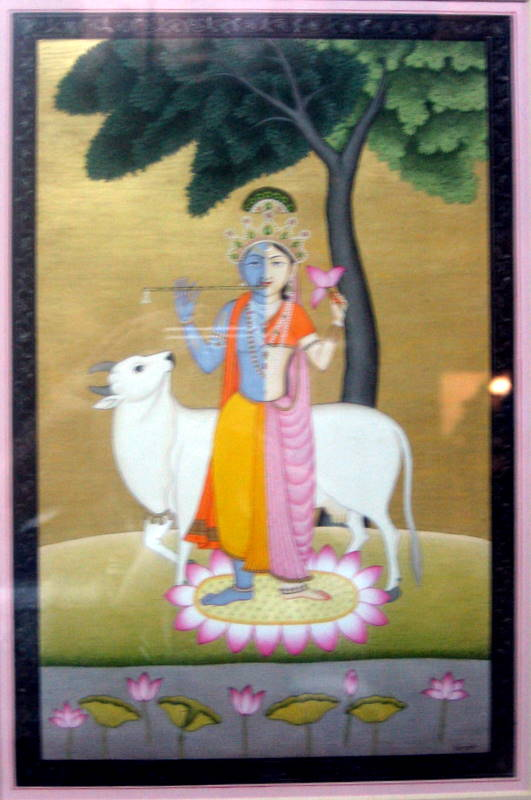
Radha-Krishna ardhanari—depicted as half-male and half-female

Nimbarka, who is widely held by scholars such as Satyanand Joseph, Prof. Rasik Bihari Joshi, Prof. M. M. Aggrawal etc., to be at least of the same time or before the appearance of Shankaracharya, was the first acharya to worship Radha along with Krishna in Sakhi Bhava Upasana method of worship. In his Vedanta Kamadhenu Dashashloki (verse 6), it is clearly stated that:

ange tu vaame vrishabhaanujaam mudaa viraajamaanaam anuruupasaubhagaam.
sakhiisahasraih parisevitaam sadaa smarema deviim sakalestakaamadaam

Translation:

The left portion of the body of the Supreme Lord is Shrimati Radha, seated blissfully, as beautiful as the Lord Himself; who is served by thousands of gopis: we meditate on the Supreme Goddess, the fulfiller of all desires.

This theme was taken up by Jayadeva Goswami and other poets of the time who saw the inherent beauty and bliss which constitute this philosophy. In his Gita Govinda Krishna speaks to Radha:

O woman with desire, place on this patch of flower-strewn floor your lotus foot,
And let your foot through beauty win,
To me who am the Lord of All, O be attached, now always yours.
O follow me, my little Radha.

— Jayadeva, Gita Govinda

It is believed, however, that the source of Jayadeva's heroine in his poem remains a puzzle of the Sanskrit Literature. At the same time there are well documented references to works earlier than Gita Govinda, which some count to be more than twenty. The figure of Radha is one of the most elusive in the literature of Sanskrit; she is described only in a few selected passages of Prakrit or Sanskrit poetry, a few inscriptions and a few works on grammar, poetry and drama. Jayadeva has referred to them and created an exquisite lyrical poem of passionate devotion in the 12th century CE, and from this poetic beginning a huge movement specific to Bengal began.

In this sampradaya, the significance of Radha is not less than the significance of Sri Krsna. Both are conjointly the object to be worshiped in this school of Nimbarka, who is also one of the first commentators on Brahma Sutras under the name Vedanta-Parijata-Saurabha. The later acharyas of the Nimbarka Sampradaya in the 13th and 14th centuries in Vrindavana composed much literature on the Divine Couple. Swami Sri Sribhatta, the elder god-brother of Jayadeva composed the Yugala Shataka for the Dhrupada style of musical presentation like Jayadeva, however unlike Jayadeva who composed his work in Sanskrit, Swami Shribhatta's compositions are in Vraja language, a Hindi vernacular which was understood by all inhabitants of Vraja. Indeed, the rest of the acharyas of this tradition wrote in Vraja language and due to the lack of prevalence of this language in modern times, very little research has been done, even though these Acharyas predate the Six Goswamis of Vrindavan by centuries. Rare exception was Vijay Ramnarace's PhD thesis in 2014.

In any case, the sole object of worship in the Nimbarka Sampradaya is the unified Divine Couple of Shri Radha Krishna. According to the 16th century Mahavani written by Jagadguru Swami Sri Harivyasa Devacharya -

"radhaamkrsnasvaroopaam vai, krishnam raadhaasvarupinam; kalaatmaanam nikunjastham gururoopam sadaa bhaje"

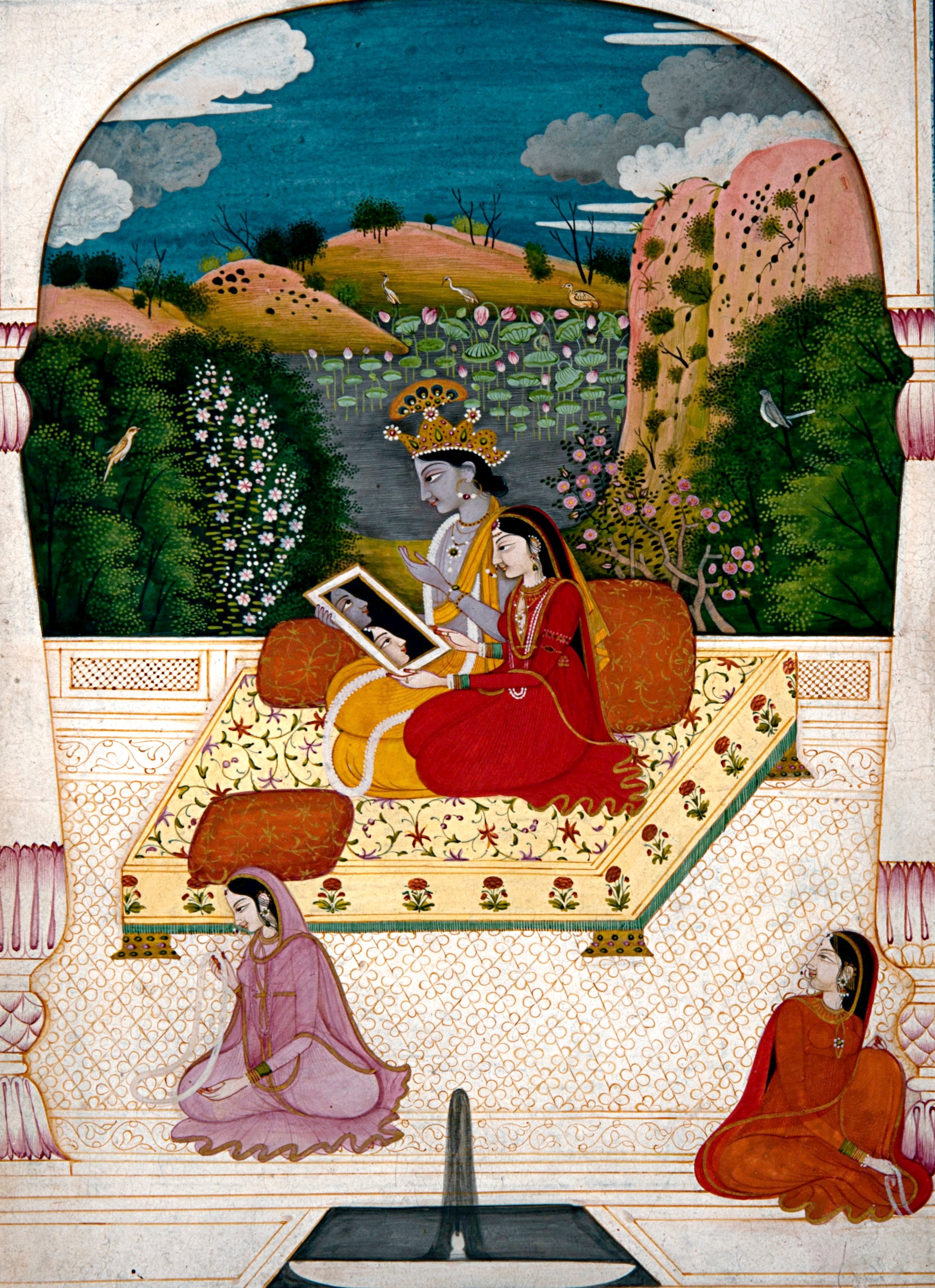
Radha Krishna looking into the mirror (1800 CE painting)

which means "I ceaselessly praise Radha who is none other than Krishna, and Sri Krishna who is none other than Radha, whose unity is represented by the Kaamabeeja and who are forever resident in Nikunja Goloka Vrindavana."

The contribution from the Nimbarka Sampradaya to the philosophy of Radha Krishna is undeniable, as the philosophy and theology originate in it.

=== Pranami Sampradaya ===
The Pranami Sampradaya (Pranami Panth) emerged in the 17th century in Gujarat, based on the Radha-Krishna-focussed syncretic Hindu-Islamic teachings of Devchandra Maharaj and his famous successor, Mahamati Prannath.

=== Pushtimarg Sampradaya ===
Vallabhacharya, founder of Pushtimarg tradition even before Chaitanya, worshipped Radha, where according to some sects, the devotees identify mainly with the female companion (sakhis) of Radha who are privileged to arrange intimate pastimes for RadhaKrishna.

One of the prominent poets of this tradition, which also called Radhavallabhi, named Dhruvadasa was notable for being principally concerned with the private relationships of Radha and Krishna. In his poetry Caurasi Pad and in the commentaries of his followers, the concentration is in meditation on the unique benefits of constant reflection on the eternal lila.

Radhavallabhis share with their Vaishnava co-religionists a great regard for Bhagavata Purana, but some of the pastimes that are outside the scope of relationships with Radha and gopis do not feature in the concept of this school. Emphasis is placed on the sweetness of the relationship, or rasa.

=== Radha Vallabh Sampradaya ===
The Radha-centered Radha Vallabh Sampradaya founded by Hith Harivansh Mahaprabhu in the 16th century occupies a special position among other traditions. In its theology, Radha is worshiped as the supreme deity, and Krishna is in a subordinate position.

=== Swaminarayan Sampradaya ===
Radha-Krishna Dev has a special place in the Swaminarayan Sampradaya as Swaminarayan himself referred to Radha Krishna in the Shikshapatri he wrote. Further, he himself ordered the construction of temples in which Radha Krishna have been installed as deities. Swaminarayan "explained that Krishna appears in many forms. When he is together with Radha, he is regarded as supreme lord under the name of Radha-Krishna; with Rukmini he is known as Lakshmi-Narayana." The first temple constructed in the sect, built in Ahmedabad in 1822, houses the images of Nara Narayana, forms of Arjuna and Krishna, in the central shrine. The shrine on the left of the hall has murtis of Radha Krishna. According to the philosophy of the tradition there were many female companions of Krishna, gopis, but out of all of them Radha was considered to be the perfect devotee. Those who wish to come close to Krishna must cultivate the devotional qualities of Radha. According to theory the sect has set aside Goloka as the supreme heaven or abode (in fact, in some of their temples, such as the Mumbai Temple, the murtis installed are those of Shri Gaulokvihari and Radhikaji), because there Krishna is supposed to be enjoying himself with his Gopis, who according to the Swaminarayana sampradaya the milkmaids with whom Krishna danced; his relations with them symbolize the relation of God with the devotee in reciprocation.

=== Vaishnava-Sahajiya ===
Since the 15th century CE, the Tantric Vaishnava-Sahajiya tradition flourished in Bengal and Assam, inspired by Bengali spiritual poet Chandidas, where Krishna is the inner divine aspect of man and Radha is the aspect of woman.

The date of Chandidas poem Srikrsnakirtana is still under question however the text remains one of the most important evidences of early portrayal of the popular story of "Lord Krishna's love for the cowherd girl Radha" in Bengali literature and religion. The 412 songs of Srikrsnakirtana are divided into thirteen sections that represent the core of the Radha-Krishna legendary cycle, with many variants providing excellent comparative material. The manuscript clearly suggests that the songs were meant to be song, and implies particular ragas for the recitation. There is considerable debate as to the authenticity of the text that has significant religious meaning.

=== Warkari Tradition ===
In Warkari tradition which is majorly based in the region of Maharashtra, Radha and Krishna are often venerated in their regional forms of Rahi and Vithoba, also called Vithala. According to the local legends, Rahi (Radha) is the wife of Vithala (Krishna).

== Outside Hinduism ==
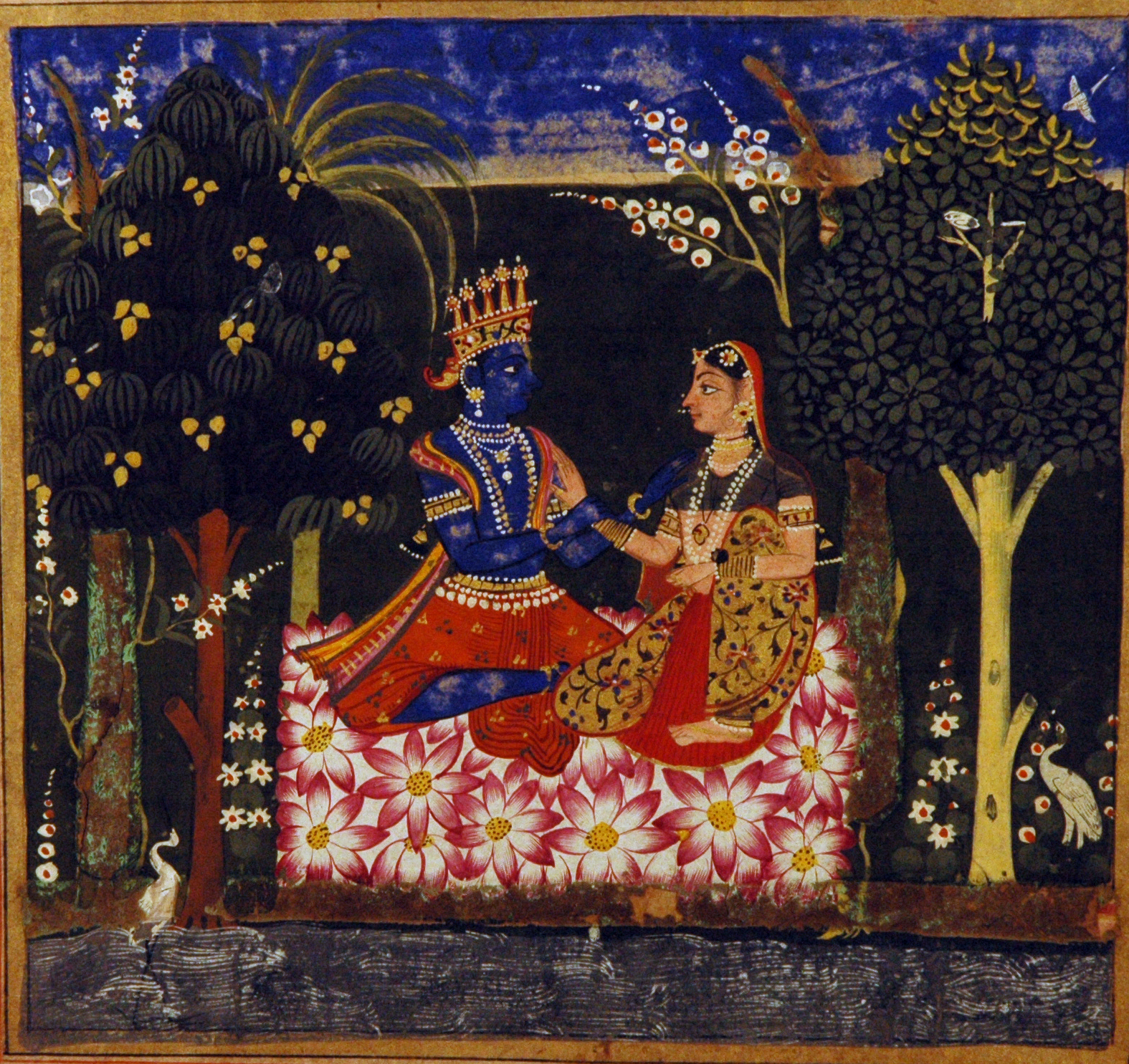
Radha Krishna art inspired by Gita Govinda

Outside Hinduism, Radha and Krishna are mentioned in the scriptures and commentaries of Jainism and Sikhism.

Guru Gobind Singh, in his Dasam Grantha, describes Radha the, sukl bhis rika, thus : "Radhika went out in the light of the white soft moon, wearing a white robe to meet her Lord. It was white everywhere and hidden in it, she appeared like the light itself in search of Him".

In many Jain commentaries including the popular Venisamhara by Narayana Bhatta and Dhvanyaloka by Anandavardhana written in 7th century Radha and Krishna are mentioned. Jain scholars like Somadeva Suri and Vikram Bhatta continued mentioning Radha-Krishna between 9th-12th century in their literary works.

== Temples ==
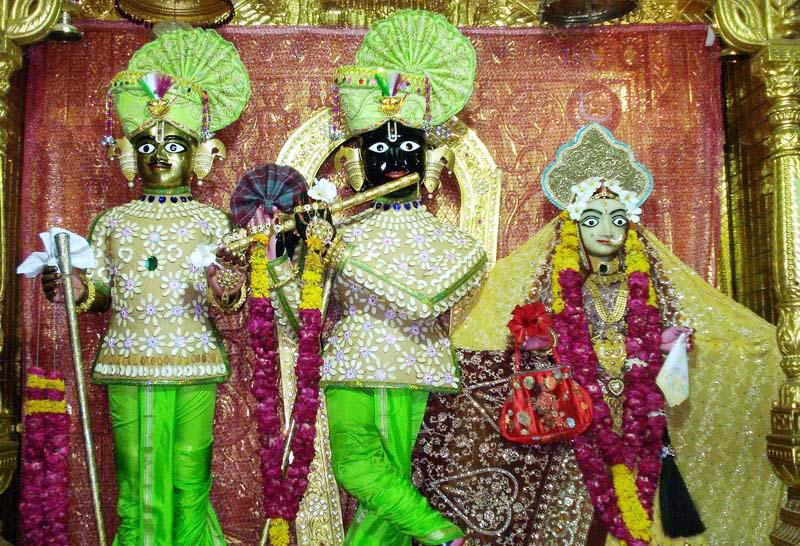
Radha (right), Krishna (center) at Swaminarayan temple Gadhada, Gujarat

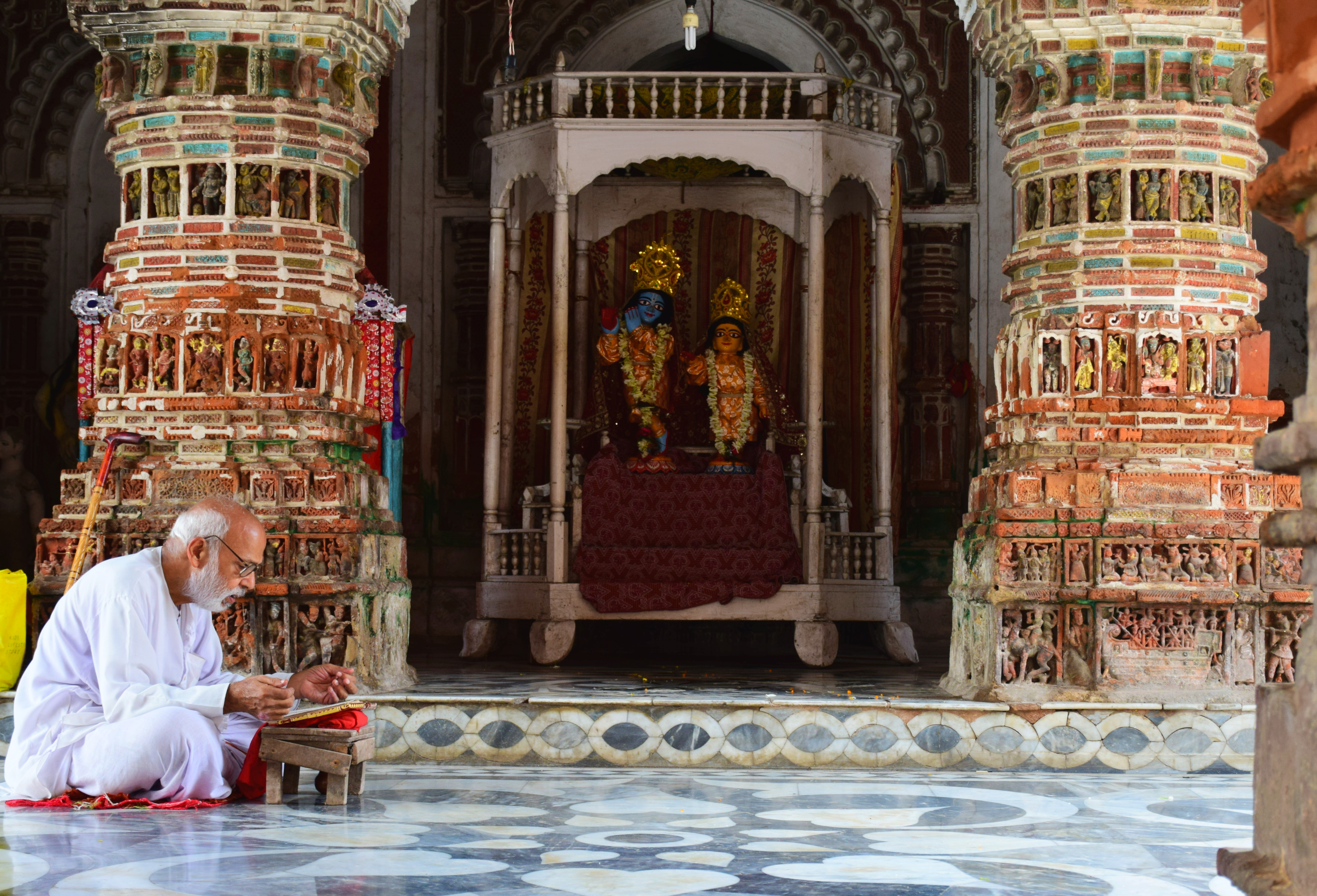
A devotee reading holy book inside the interiors of dedicated to Radha-Krishna 18th-century Lalji Temple, Kalna, West Bengal

In India

Temples of Shri Radha Krishna are prevalent throughout India and the world. However, Braj region including Vrindavan, Barsana, Gokul, Nandgaon, and Mathura are considered to be the centers of Radha Krishna worship. Some of the important temples of Radha Krishna in Braj region are -

In Vrindavan — Shri Radha Madan Mohan temple, Shri Govind Dev ji temple, Shri Radha Raman temple, Shri Radha Gokulananda temple, Shri Radha Damodar temple, Shri Bankey Bihari temple, Shri Jugal Kishore temple, Shri Radha Gopinath temple, Shri Radha Shyamasundar temple, Prem Mandir, Shahji temple, ISKCON temple, Nidhivan temple, Seva Kunj temple, Shri Radha Vallabh temple, Kusum Sarovar, Radha Kund, Pagal Baba temple, Shri Radha Raas Bihari Ashtsakhi Temple, Priyakant ju temple, and Shri Vrindavan Chandrodaya temple.

In Mathura - Shri Krishna Janambhoomi temple and Shri Dwarkadhish temple

In Barsana - Shri Radha Rani Temple (Shreeji temple), Rangeeli Mahal (Kirti Mandir), Shri Maan Mandir (Maan Garh)

In Nandgaon - Shri NandBaba temple

In Gokul - Shri Nand Yashoda Bhawan, Raman Reti temple

In Bhandirvan - Shri Radha Krishna Vivah Sthali, Shri Radha Bhandirbihari temple

Some other important Radha Krishna temples across India are - Shri Radha Govind Dev ji and Shri Radha Gopinath Ji temples in Jaipur, Lalji Temple in Kalna, Hare Krishna Golden Temple in Hyderabad, Murlidhar Krishna Temple in Naggar, Shri Govindajee temple in Imphal, Madan Mohan temple in Karauli, Mayapur Chandrodaya Mandir in Nadia, Swaminarayan temple Gadhada in Botad, Swaminarayan temple Vadtal in Kheda, Iskcon Bangalore, Iskcon Chennai, Iskcon Delhi, Radha Damodar Temple, Junagadh, Bhakti Mandir Mangarh, Swaminarayan temple Mumbai, Iskcon temple Mumbai, Iskcon temple Ujjain, Swaminarayan temple Bhuj, Iskcon temple Patna, Swaminarayan temple Dholera near Ahmedabad, Radha Krishna temple of Baroh in Kangra, historical temples in Bishnupur of Bankura district including Rasmancha, Radha Shyam Temple, Shyam Ray Temple, Jor Bangla, and Radha Madhab Temple.

Outside India

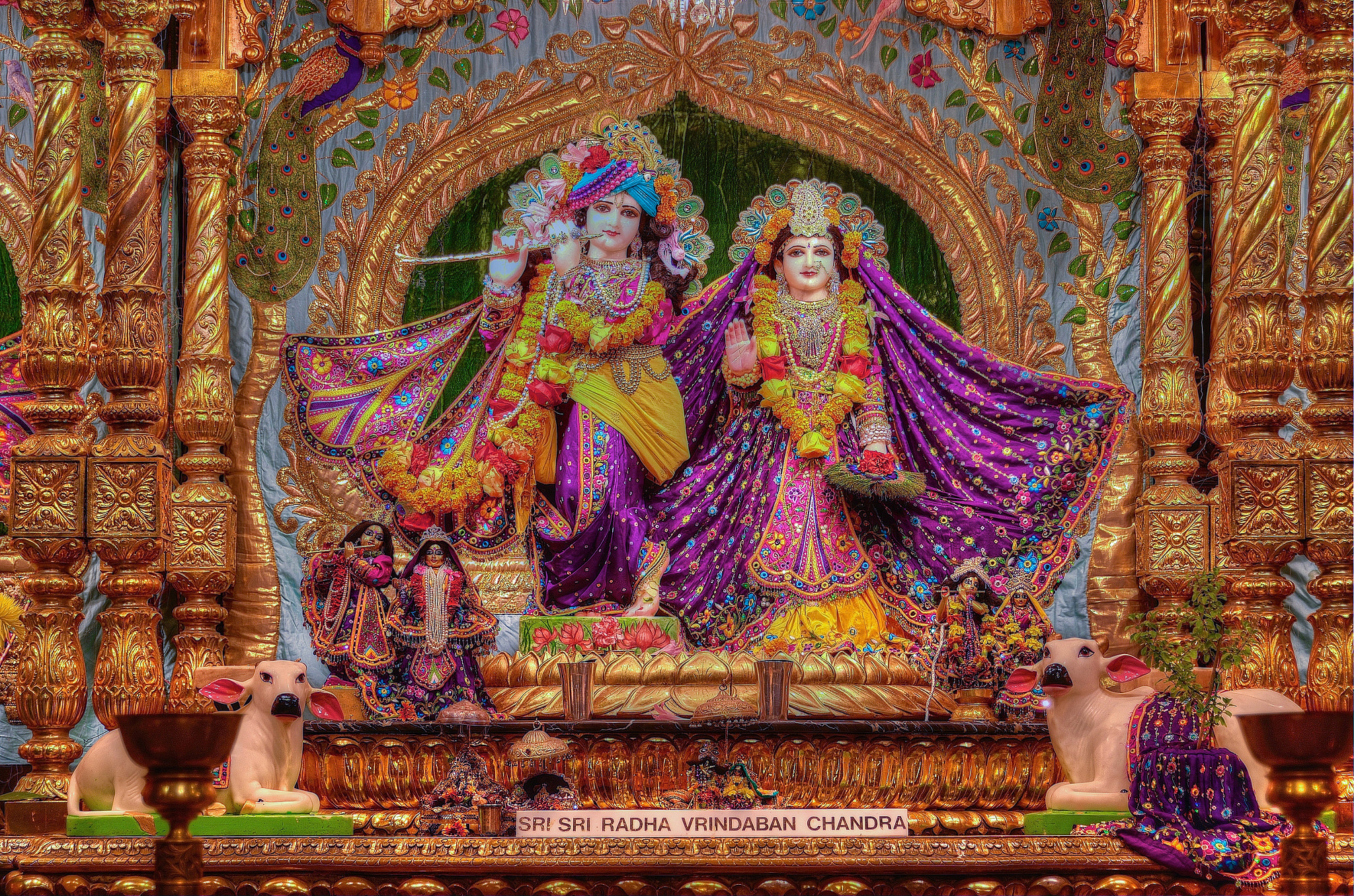
Radha Krishna temple in Wheeling, West Virginia

There are many Vaishnavism traditions that spread the worship of Radha Krishna across the world. There are around 850 Iskcon temples spread across the world which promotes the worship of Radha Krishna. Similarly, Swaminarayan Sampradaya has also established multiple temples outside India in which Radha Krishna Dev are worshipped. Radha Madhav Dham in Austin, Texas built by Jagadguru Kripalu Parishat is one of the biggest Radha Krishna temple in the Western hemisphere. In Malaysia, Shri Kunj Bihari temple is one of the historic temple of Radha-Krishna established in 1835.

== Hymns ==
The Shri Radhika Krishnashtaka (also called the Radhashtak) is a hymn. It is said that the reciter can get to Krishna via Radha by chanting it. The other popular songs and prayers include — Yugalashtakam written by Jiva Goswami which glorifies the love and inseparability of the divine couple Radha Krishna and Jayadeva's much acclaimed work Gita Govinda which was written in the 12th century and is still the part of temple songs of Jagannath temple, Puri. Radhe Krishna — the maha-mantra of Nimbarka Sampradaya is as follows:

Rādhe Kṛṣṇa Rādhe Kṛṣṇa
Kṛṣṇa Kṛṣṇa Rādhe Rādhe
Rādhe Shyām Rādhe Shyām
Shyām Shyām Rādhe Rādhe

== Gallery ==
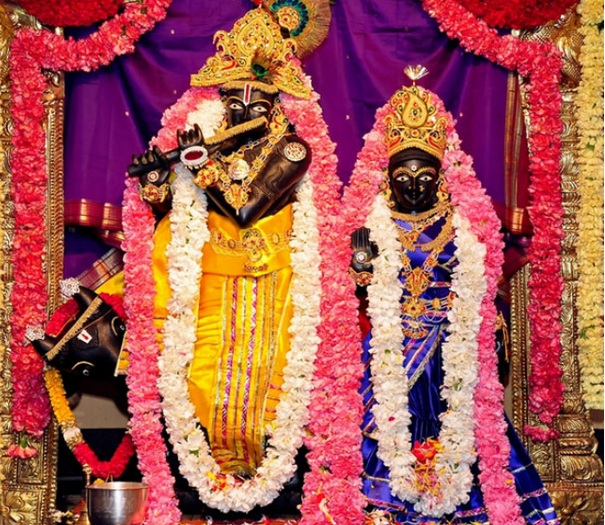
Shree Radha Krishna Ashta Shakthi Mandir at Parashakthi Temple, Pontiac, USA

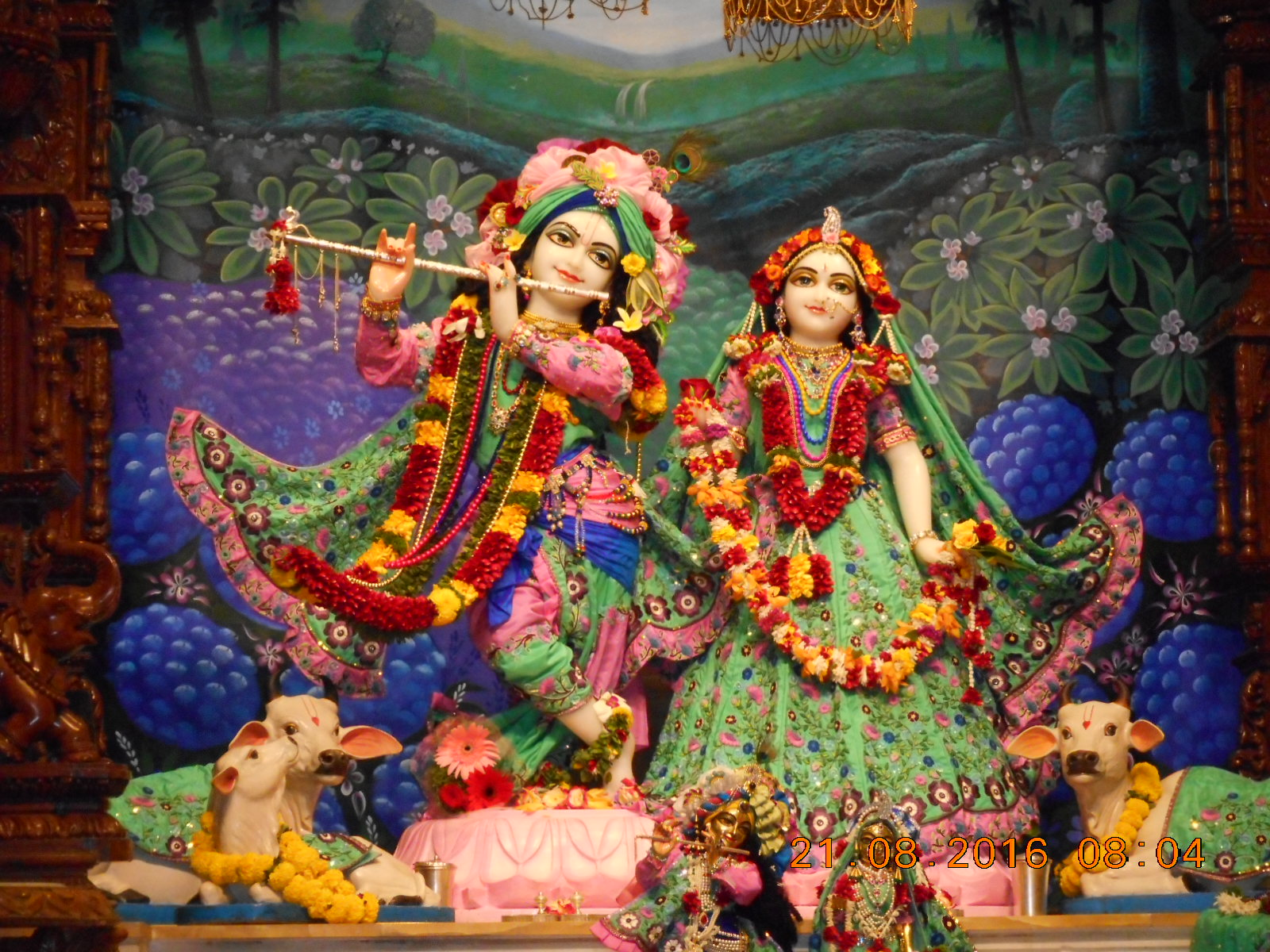
Radha Krishna idols at Iskcon Temple Pune

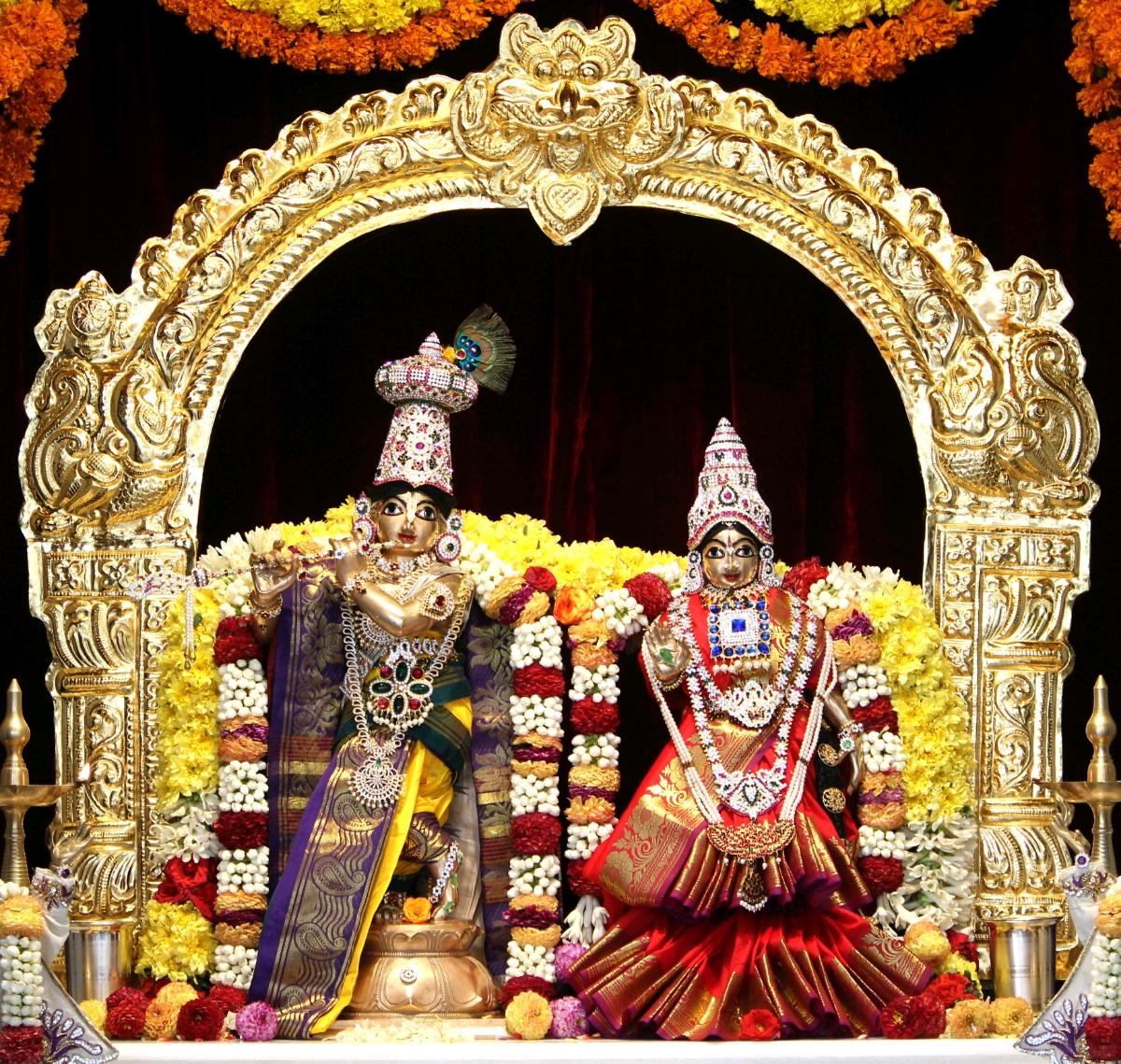
Radha Krishna at Hare Krishna Golden Temple, Hyderabad

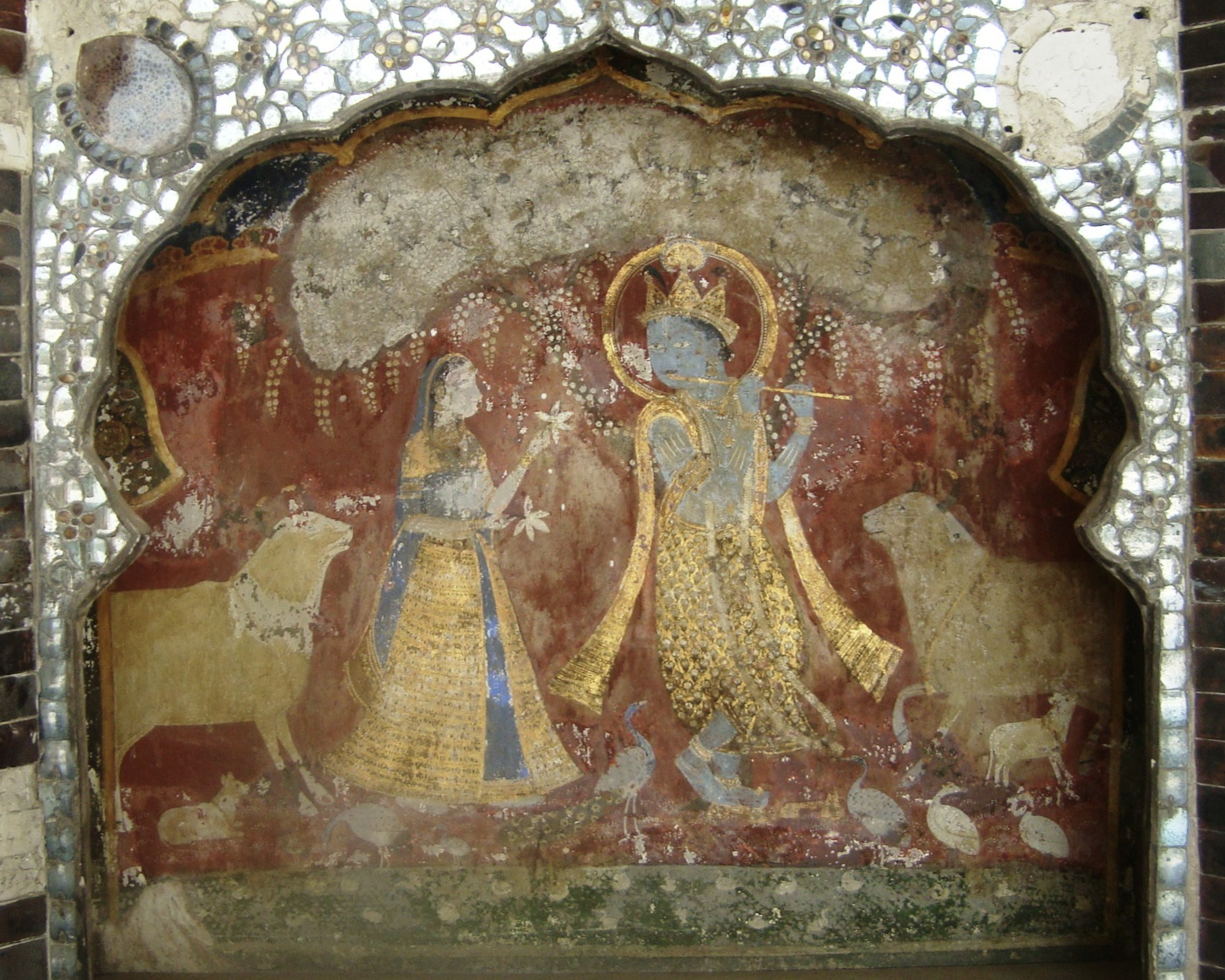
Gilded mural of Radha Krishna in Kangra style at Sheesh Mahal, Lahore

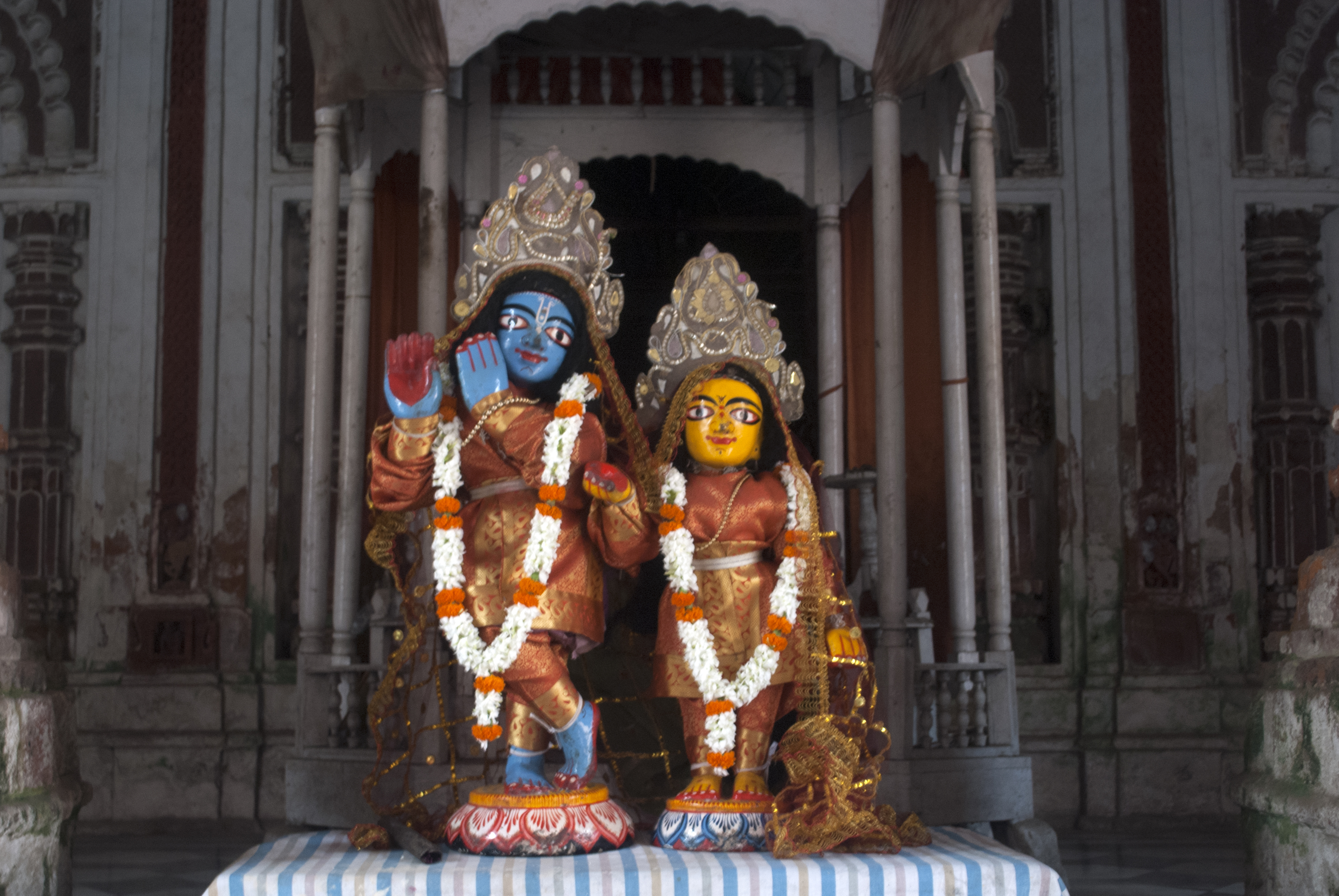
Radha Krishna idols in Lalji Temple, Bishnupur

== See also ==
- Krishna and Radha in a Pavilion
- Lakshmi Narayana
- Goloka
- Banke Bihari Temple, Vrindavan
- Radha Rani Temple, Barsana
- Radha Krishna Vivah Sthali, Bhandirvan
- Radha Vallabh Temple, Vrindavan

== Footnotes ==
=== References ===
- Archer, W. G. (2004) [1957]. The Loves of Krishna in Indian Painting and Poetry. Mineola, NY: Dover Publ. ISBN 0-486-43371-4.
- Basu, M. M. (1932). The Post-Caitanya Sahajiya Cult of Bengal. Calcutta: University of Calcutta Press.
- Beck, Guy L. (2005). "Krishna as Loving Husband of God: The Alternative Krishnology of the Rādhāvallabha Sampradaya". In Guy L. Beck (ed.). Alternative Krishnas: Regional and Vernacular Variations on a Hindu Deity. Albany, NY: SUNY Press. pp. 65–90. ISBN 978-0-7914-6415-1.
- Datta, Amaresh, ed. (1988). "Gitagovinda". Encyclopaedia of Indian Literature: Devraj to Jyoti. Vol. 2. New Delhi: Sahitya Akademi. pp. 1414–1423. ISBN 81-260-1194-7.
- Schweig, Graham M. (2004). "Krishna: The Intimate Deity". In Bryant, Edwin F.; Ekstrand, Maria L. (eds.). The Hare Krisha Movement: The Postcharismatic Fate of a Religious Transplant. Columbia University Press. ISBN 9780231508438.
- Hardy, Friedhelm E. (1987). "Kṛṣṇaism". In Mircea Eliade (ed.). The Encyclopedia of Religion. Vol. 8. New York: MacMillan. pp. 387–392. ISBN 978-0-02897-135-3 – via Encyclopedia.com.
- Hawley, John Stratton (2005). Three Bhakti Voices. Mirabai, Surdas, and Kabir in Their Time and Ours. Oxford; New York: Oxford University Press. ISBN 978-0195670851.
- Hayes, Glen Alexander (2005). "Contemporary Metaphor Theory and Alternative Views of Krishna and Rādhā in Vaishnava Sahajiyā". In Guy L. Beck (ed.). Alternative Krishnas: Regional and Vernacular Variations on a Hindu Deity. Albany, NY: SUNY Press. pp. 19–32. ISBN 978-0-7914-6415-1.
- Love Song of the Dark Lord: Jayadeva's Gītagovinda. Translated by Miller, Barbara Stoler. New York: Columbia University Press. 1977. ISBN 0231040288. Archived from the original on 2018-12-25.
- Miller, Barbara S. (1975). "Rādhā: Consort of Kṛṣṇa's Vernal Passion". Journal of the American Oriental Society. 95 (4): 655–671. doi:10.2307/601022. JSTOR 601022.
- Ramnarace, Vijay (2014). Rādhā-Kṛṣṇa's Vedāntic Debut: Chronology & Rationalisation in the Nimbārka Sampradāya (PDF) (PhD thesis). University of Edinburgh. Archived (PDF) from the original on 2022-10-09.
- Rosen, Steven (2002). The hidden glory of India. Los Angeles: Bhaktivedanta Book Trust. ISBN 0-89213-351-1.
- Rosenstein, Lucy (1998). "The Rādhāvallabha and the Haridāsā Samprādayas: A Comparison". Journal of Vaishnava Studies. 7 (1): 5–18.
- Rosenstein, Ludmila L. (1997). "The Devotional Poetry of Svami Haridas". A Study of Early Braj Bhasa Verse. Groningen Oriental Studies, 12. Groningen: Egbert Forsten.
- Schwartz, Susan (2004). Rasa: performing the divine in India. New York: Columbia University Press. ISBN 0-231-13145-3.
- Schweig, Graham M. (2005). Dance of Divine Love: The Rڄasa Lڄilڄa of Krishna from the Bhڄagavata Purڄana, India's classic sacred love story. Princeton, NJ: Princeton University Press. ISBN 0-691-11446-3.
- Singh, Kunj Bihari (2004) [1963]. "Manipur Vaishnavism: A Sociological Interpretation". In Rowena Robinson (ed.). Sociology of Religion in India. Themes in Indian Sociology, 3. New Delhi: Sage Publ. India. pp. 125–132. ISBN 0-7619-9781-4.
- Snell, Rupert (1991). The Eighty-four Hymns of Hita Harivaṃśa: An Edition of the Caurāsī Pada. Delhi; London: Motilal Banarsidass; School of Oriental and African Studies. ISBN 81-208-0629-8.
- Toffin, Gérard (2012). "The Power of Boundaries: Transnational Links among Krishna Pranamis of India and Nepal". In John Zavos; et al. (eds.). Public Hinduisms. New Delhi: SAGE Publ. India. pp. 249–254. ISBN 978-81-321-1696-7.
- Valpey, Kenneth Russell (2006). Attending Kṛṣṇa's image: Caitanya Vaiṣṇava mūrti-sevā as devotional truth. New York: Routledge. ISBN 0-415-38394-3.
- Vemsani, Lavanya (2016-06-13). Krishna in History, Thought, and Culture: An Encyclopedia of the Hindu Lord of Many Names: An Encyclopedia of the Hindu Lord of Many Names. ABC-CLIO. ISBN 978-1-61069-211-3.
- White, Charles S. J. (1977). The Caurāsī Pad of Śri Hit Harivaṃś: Introduction, Translation, Notes, and Edited Braj Bhaṣa. Asian studies at Hawaii, 16. Honolulu: University Press of Hawaii. ISBN 9780824803599. ISSN 0066-8486.
- Williams, Raymond (2001). Introduction to Swaminarayan Hinduism. Cambridge University Press. ISBN 978-0-521-65422-7.
