= Radha Madhab Temple =

Radha Krishna Temple in Bishnupur, West Bengal

- রাধা মাধব মন্দির
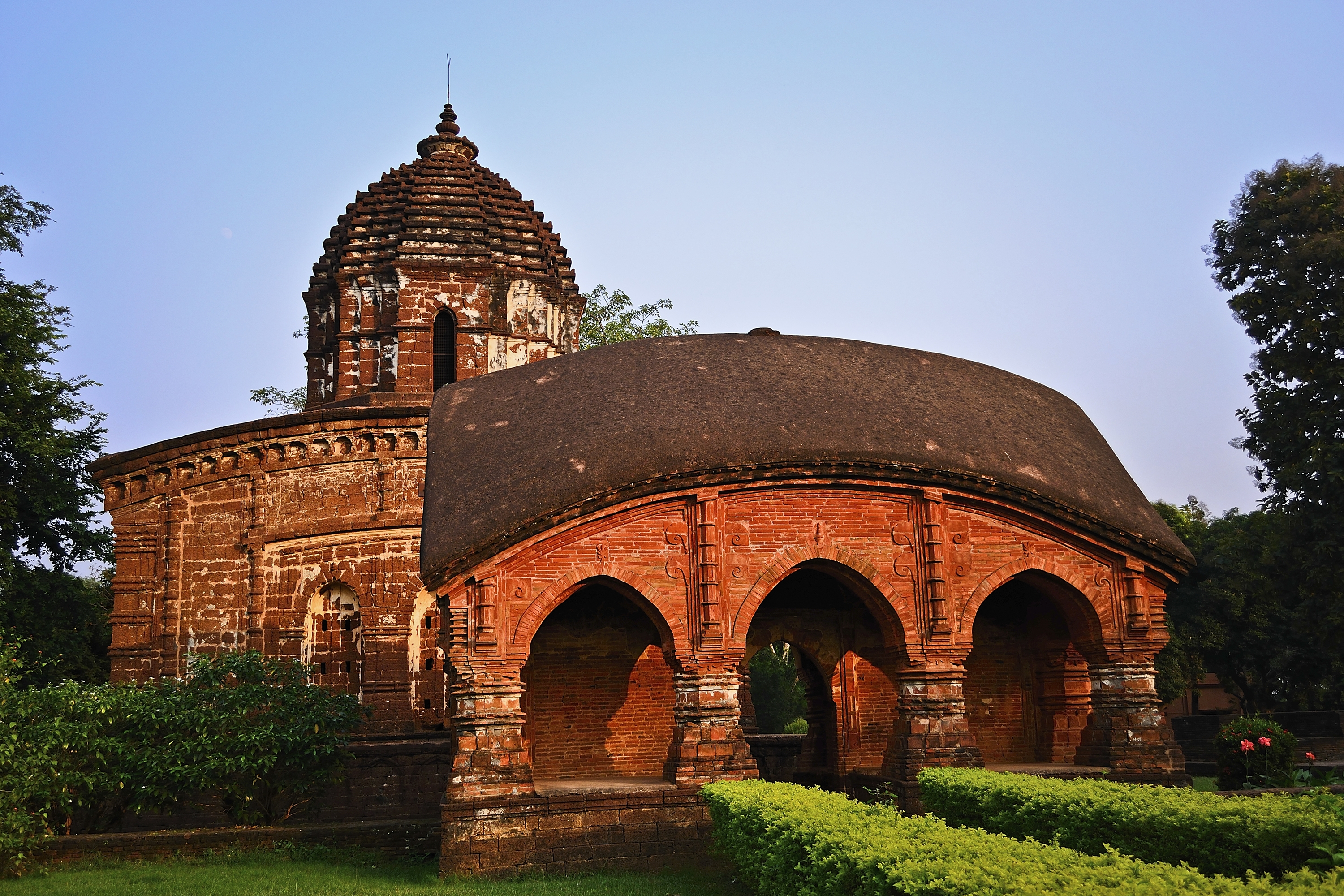
- Radha Madhab Temple

- Location within West Bengal Location within India

Religion
- Affiliation: Hinduism
- District: Bankura district
- Deity: Radha Krishna
- Status: Open

Location
- Location: Dalmadal Para, Bishnupur, West Bengal 722122, India
- Country: India
- Interactive map of Radha Madhab Temple
- Coordinates: 23°03′34.6″N 87°19′28.28″E

Architecture
- Type: Bengal temple architecture
- Style: eka-ratna style
- Founder: Churamoni Devi wife of Bir Singha Dev
- Established: 1737; 289 years ago
- Monument of National Importance
- Official name: Radha Madhav Temple
- Type: Cultural
- Reference no.: N-WB-22

Radha Madhab Temple (also known as Radha Madhav Temple) is a Hindu temple located in Bishnupur, West Bengal, India.

== History and architecture ==
According to the inscriptional plaque found in the temple, the temple was founded in 1737 by Churamoni, wife of Bir Singha Dev King of Mallabhum, and is dedicated to Radha and Krishna. The Temple is built in the Ek-ratna style temple architecture. The temple features a square layout with sides measuring approximately 11.1 meters and a height of 9.2 meters. The entrance is marked by three arches on the porch's wall. Surrounding the plinth, intricate carvings of birds, animals, and Puranic stories can be seen, all depicted with graceful detail. The side walls and lower cornice display elaborate sculptural reliefs in two rows, while additional reliefs on the arches and pillars explore a variety of themes. These decorations predominantly feature scenes from the Krishna Lila, along with Dasavatara panels and floral motifs. Adjacent to the Radha-Madhava Temple stands a unique do-chala-mandapa, known as the bhoga-mandapa, which is the only one of its kind in Bishnupur, as no other do-chala structure exists in the area.

== Gallery ==
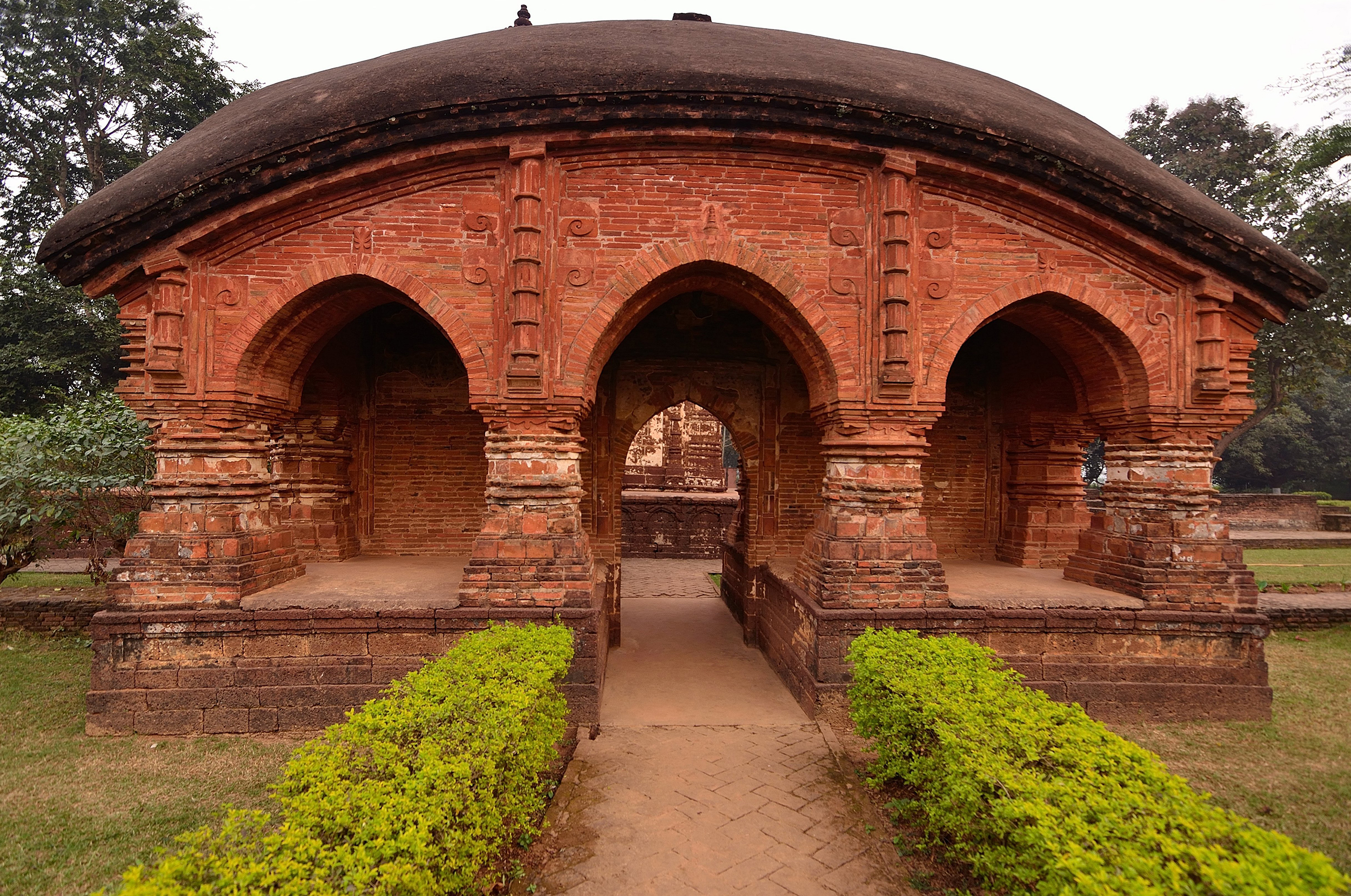

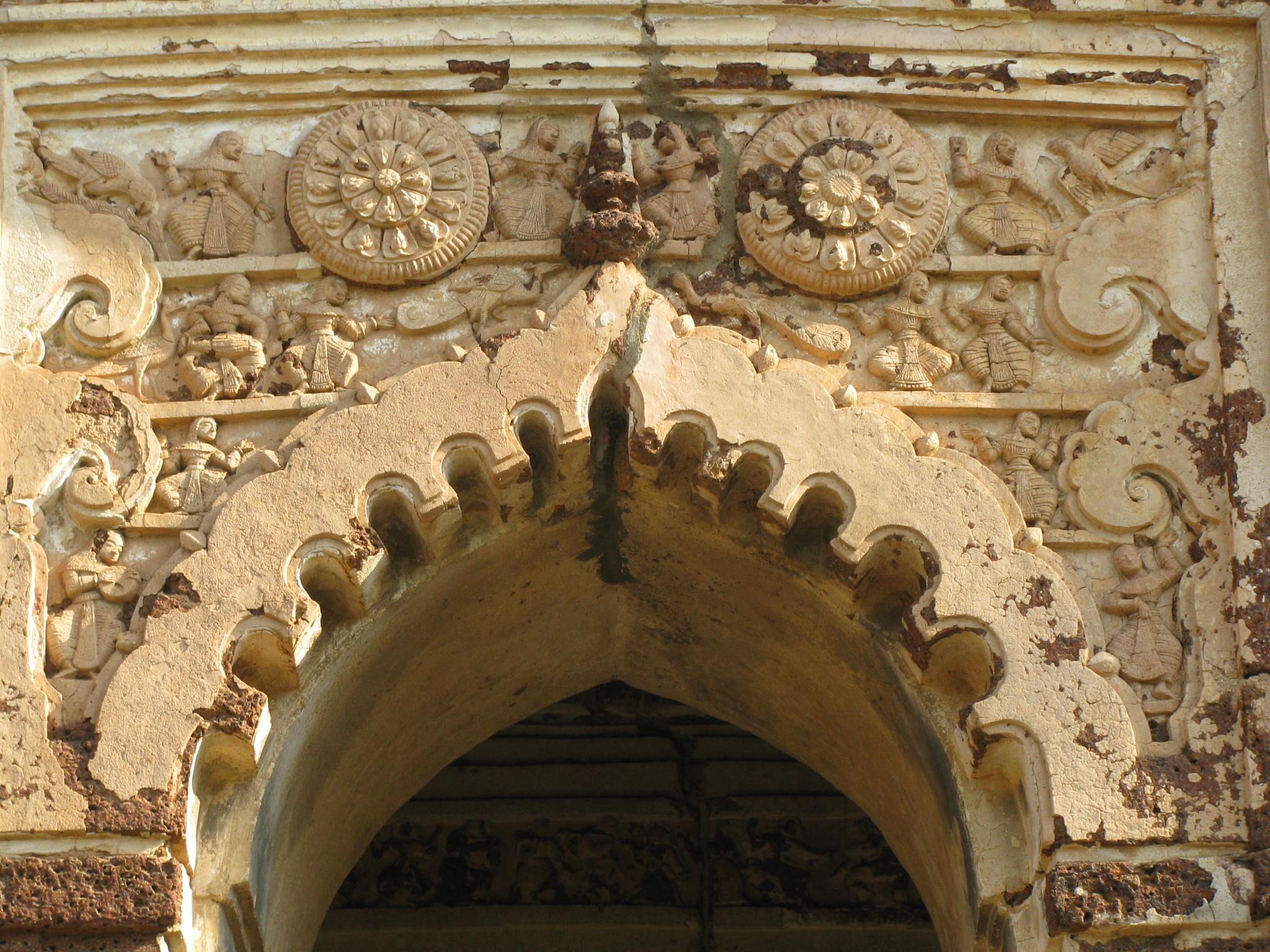

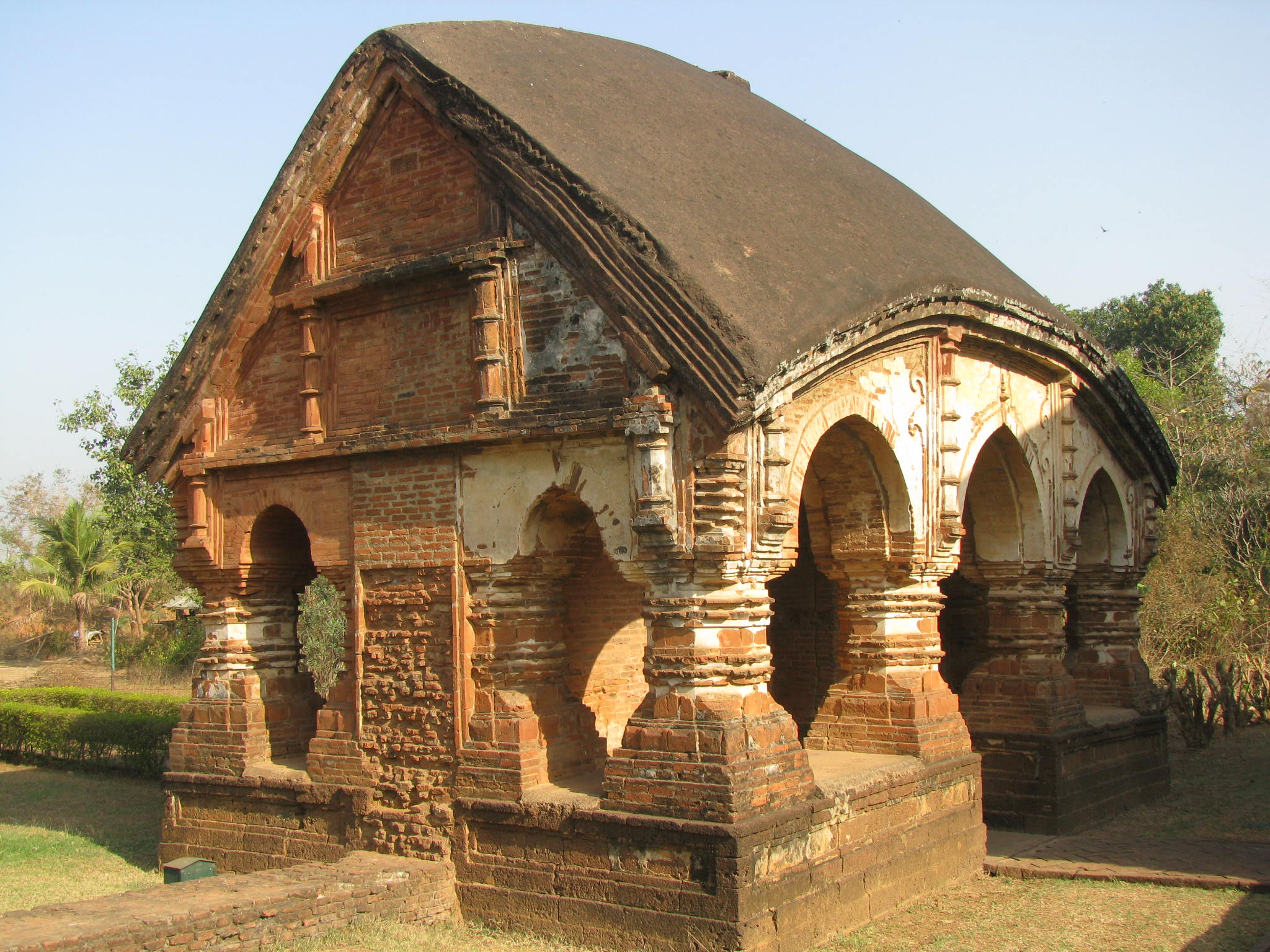

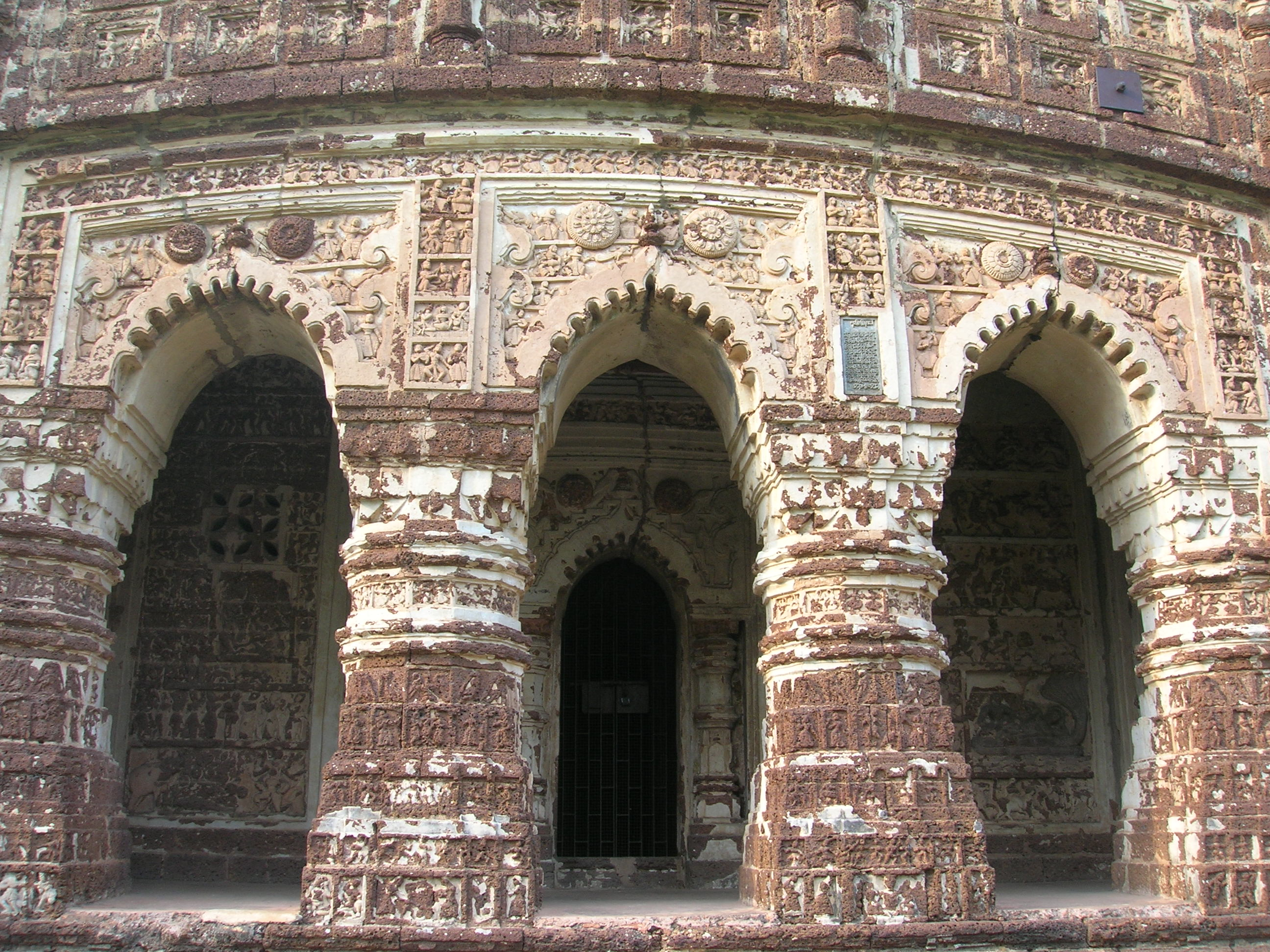

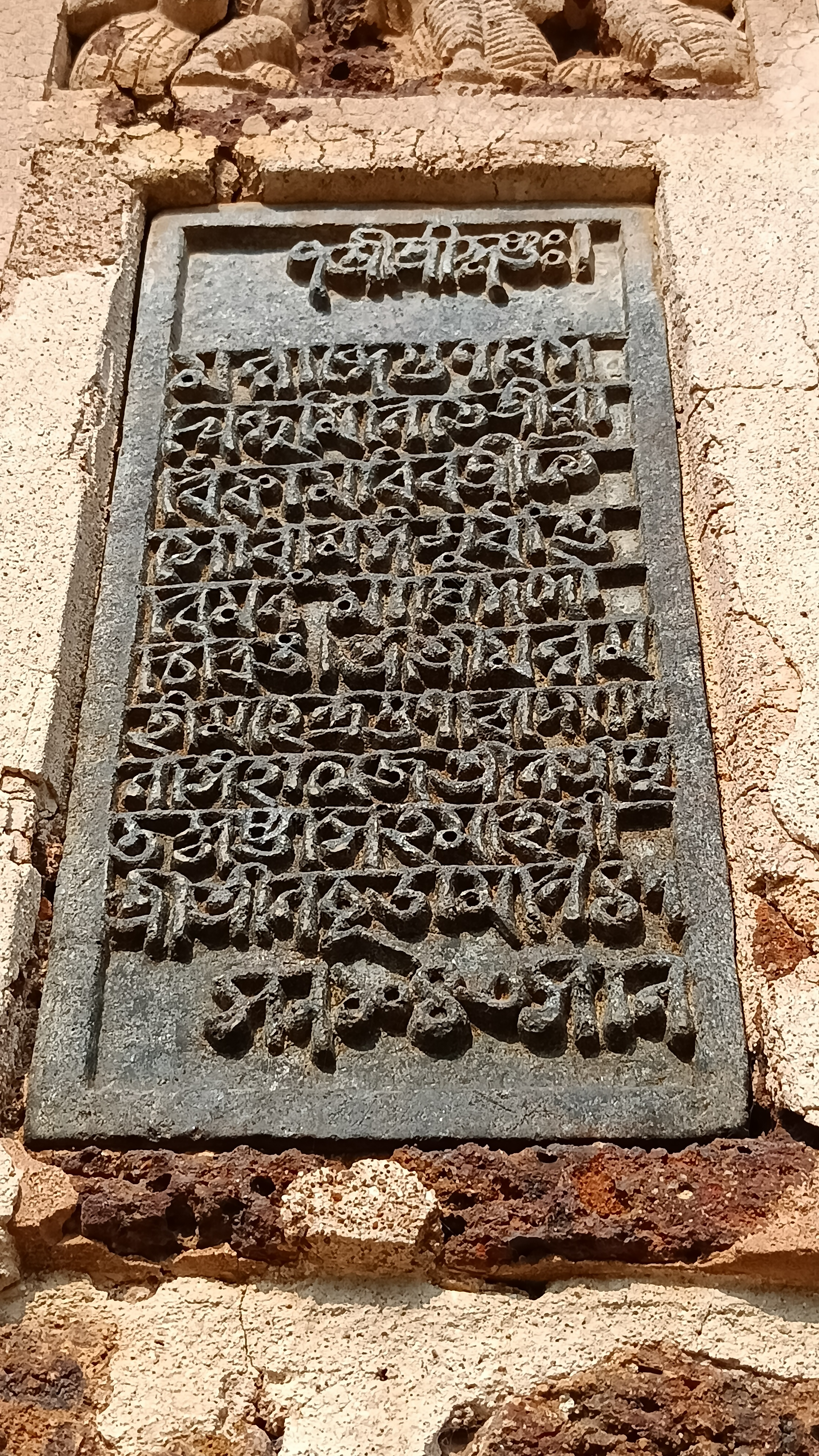

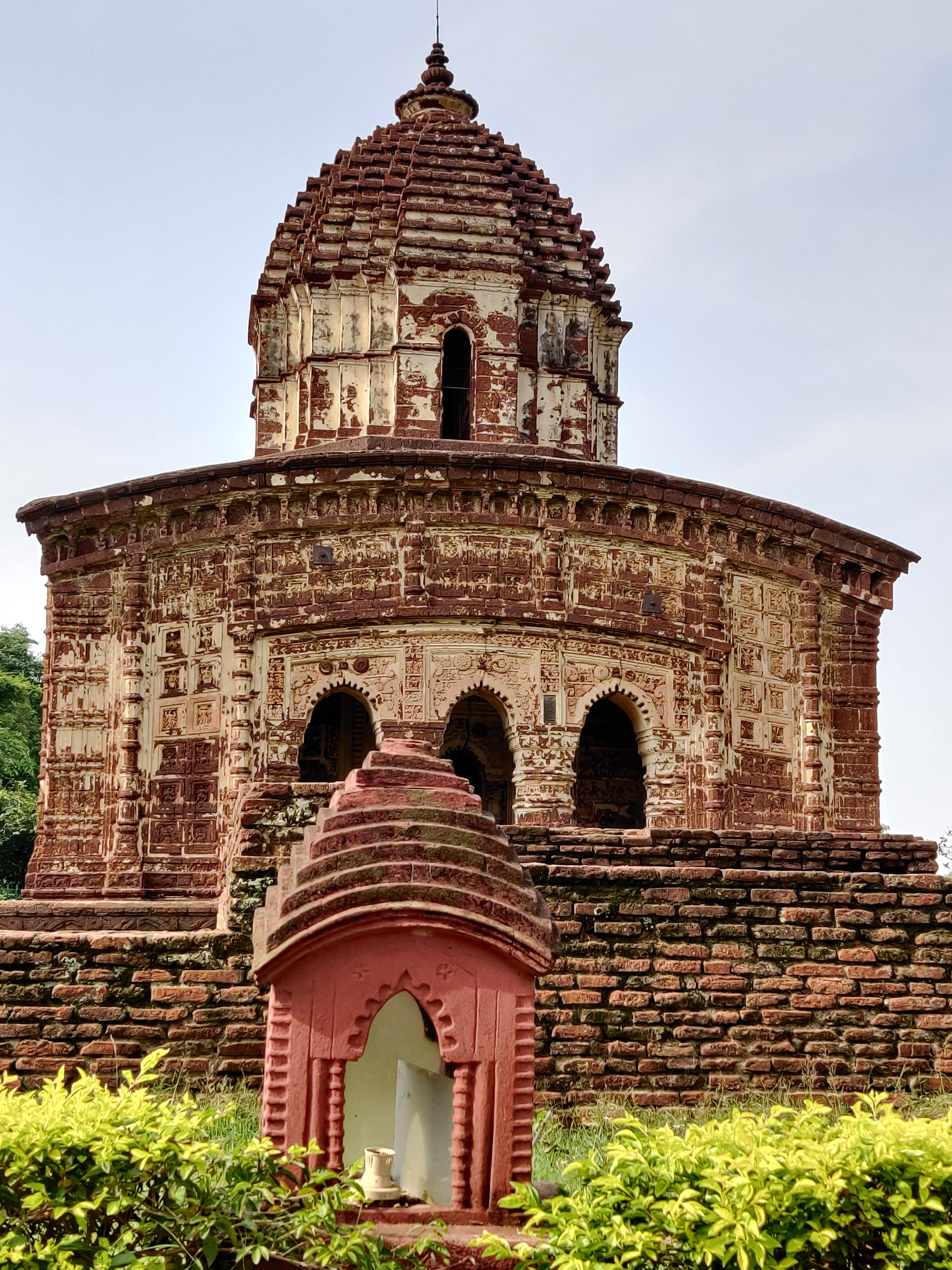

== Sources ==
- Biswas, S. S. (1992). Bishnupur (University of Illinois at Urbana-Champaign ed.). Director General, Archaeological Survey of India.
