= ISKCON Temple, Pune =

Radha Krishna temple in Pune, India

ISKCON NVCC
- Sri Sri Radha Vrindavanchandra temple
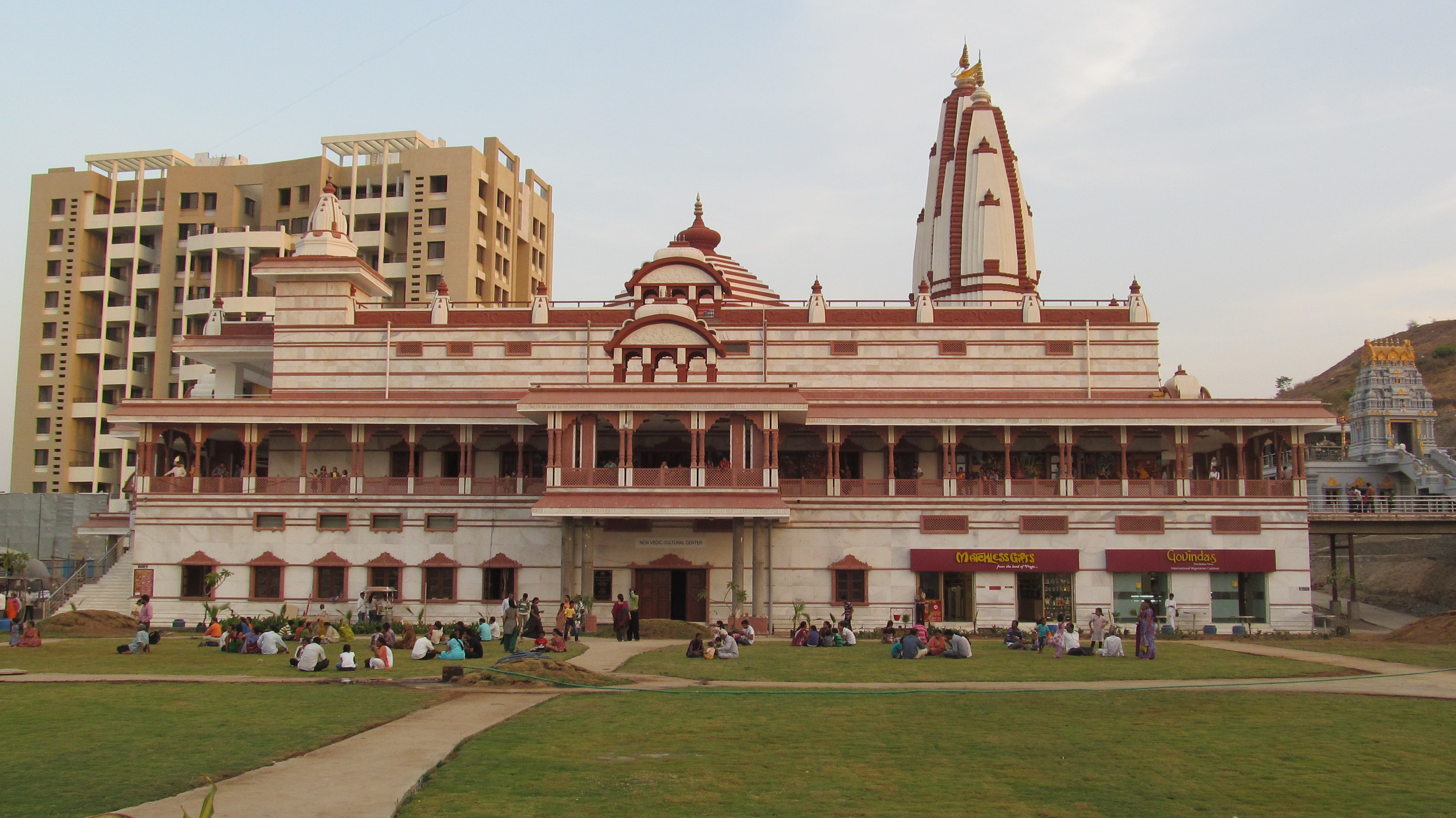
- ISKCON New Vedic Cultural Center (Maharashtra, India)

- Location in Maharashtra

Religion
- Affiliation: Hinduism
- District: Pune
- Deity: Radha Vrindavanchandra
- Festivals: Janmashtami, Radhashtami, Holi

Location
- Location: Kondhwa, Pune
- State: Maharashtra
- Country: India
- Coordinates: 18.26°N 73.52°E

Architecture
- Completed: 2013

Website
- http://www.iskconpune.com/

ISKCON New Vedic Cultural Center (NVCC), Sri Sri Radha Vrindavanchandra temple or ISKCON Pune is a Gaudiya Vaishnavism temple situated in Pune, India. The temple is dedicated to Hindu god Radha Krishna and was opened in 2013. It is the largest temple in the city of Pune.

== History ==
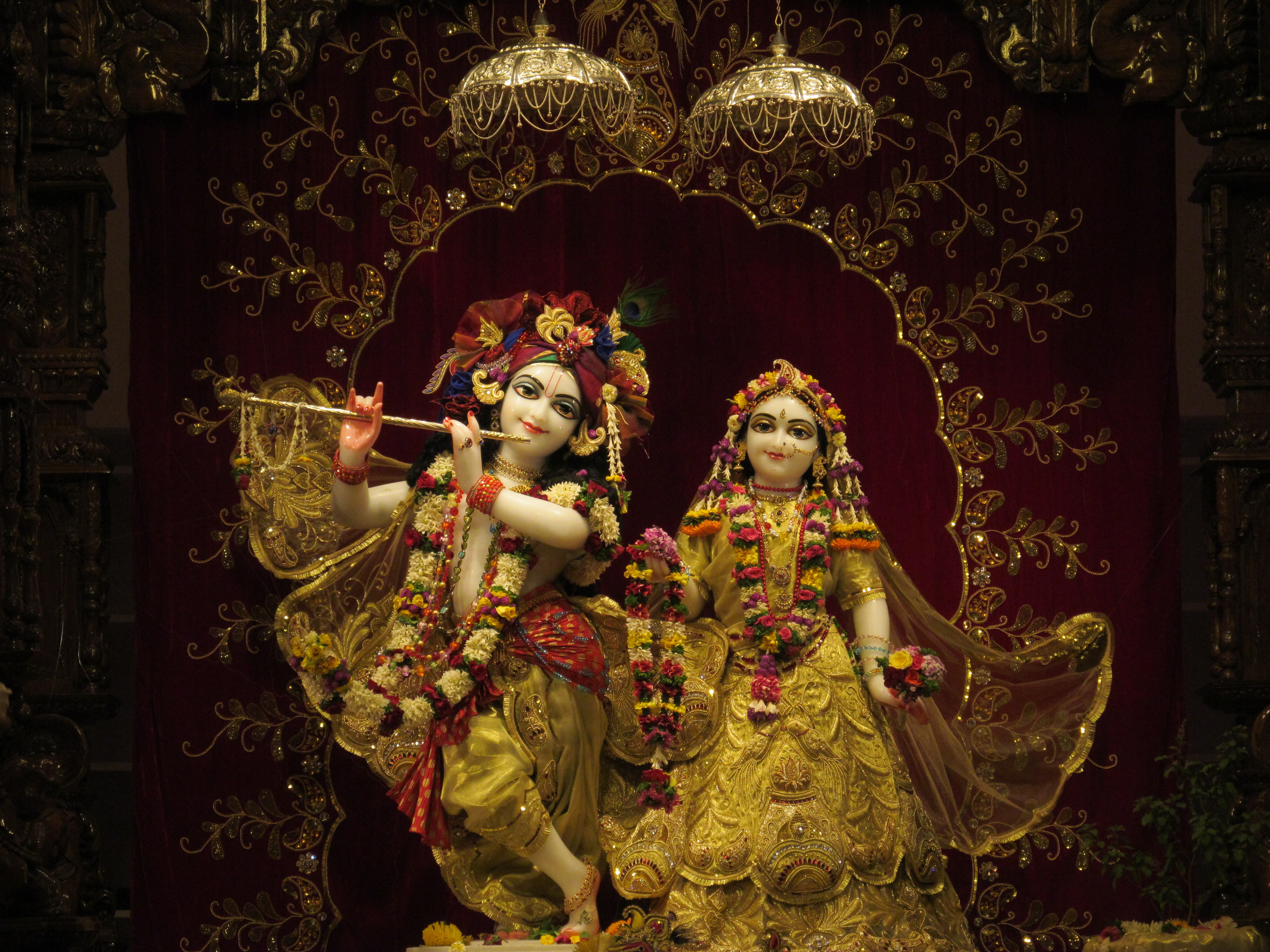
Lord Krishna and Radha in temple

The temple complex is built on 6 acres and it took seven years for construction. It took 40 Crore rupees to construct the temple funded by the Iskcon temple in Camp and devotees. The temple was inaugurated by President Pranab Mukherjee in 2013.

== Structure ==
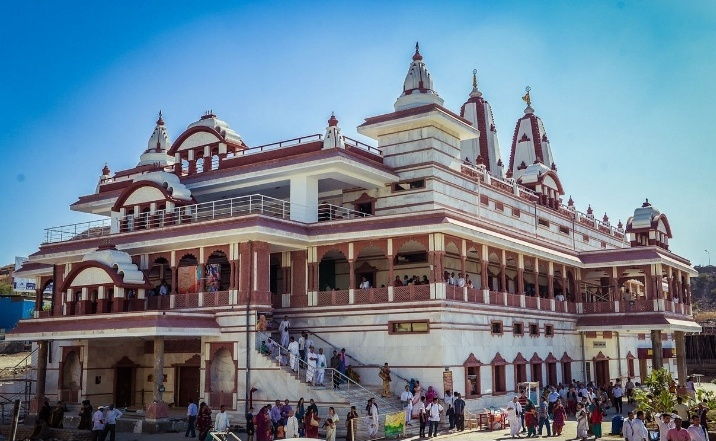
Main Radhakrishna temple

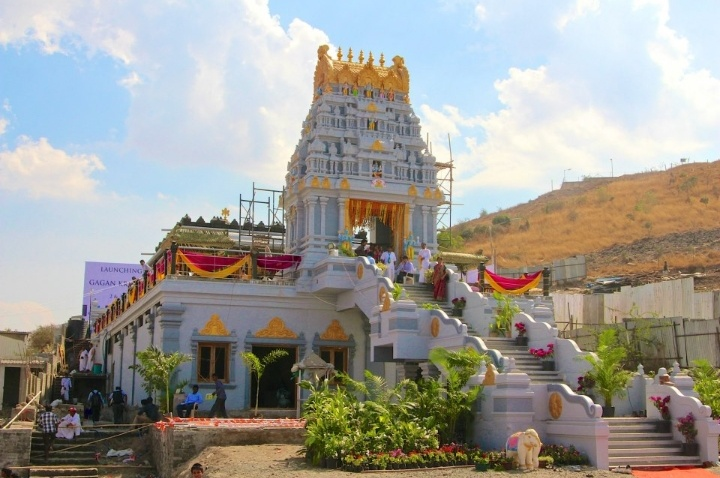
Venkateswara (Balaji) temple

The temple complex has two temples- the main Radha Krishna temple and the Venkateswara (Balaji) temple. The Radhakrishna temple is built in North Indian architecture style using red stone and marble while the Venkateswara temple is built in South Indian architecture style (Similar to Balaji temple in Tirumala) using Kota stone.

The temple offers daily classes on Bhagwad Gita and Srimad Bhagavatam.

== Gallery ==
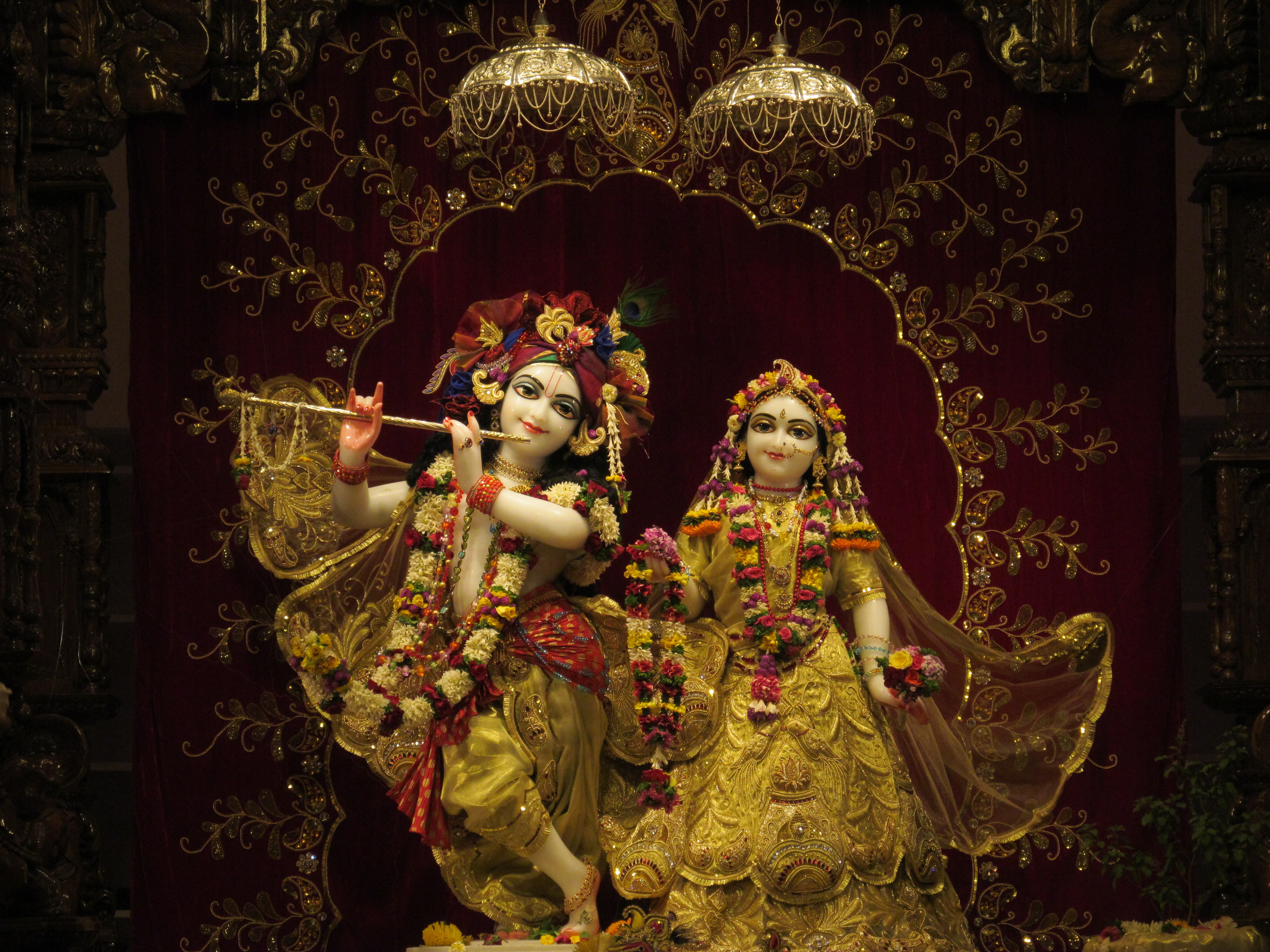
Radha Krishna idols inside the temple

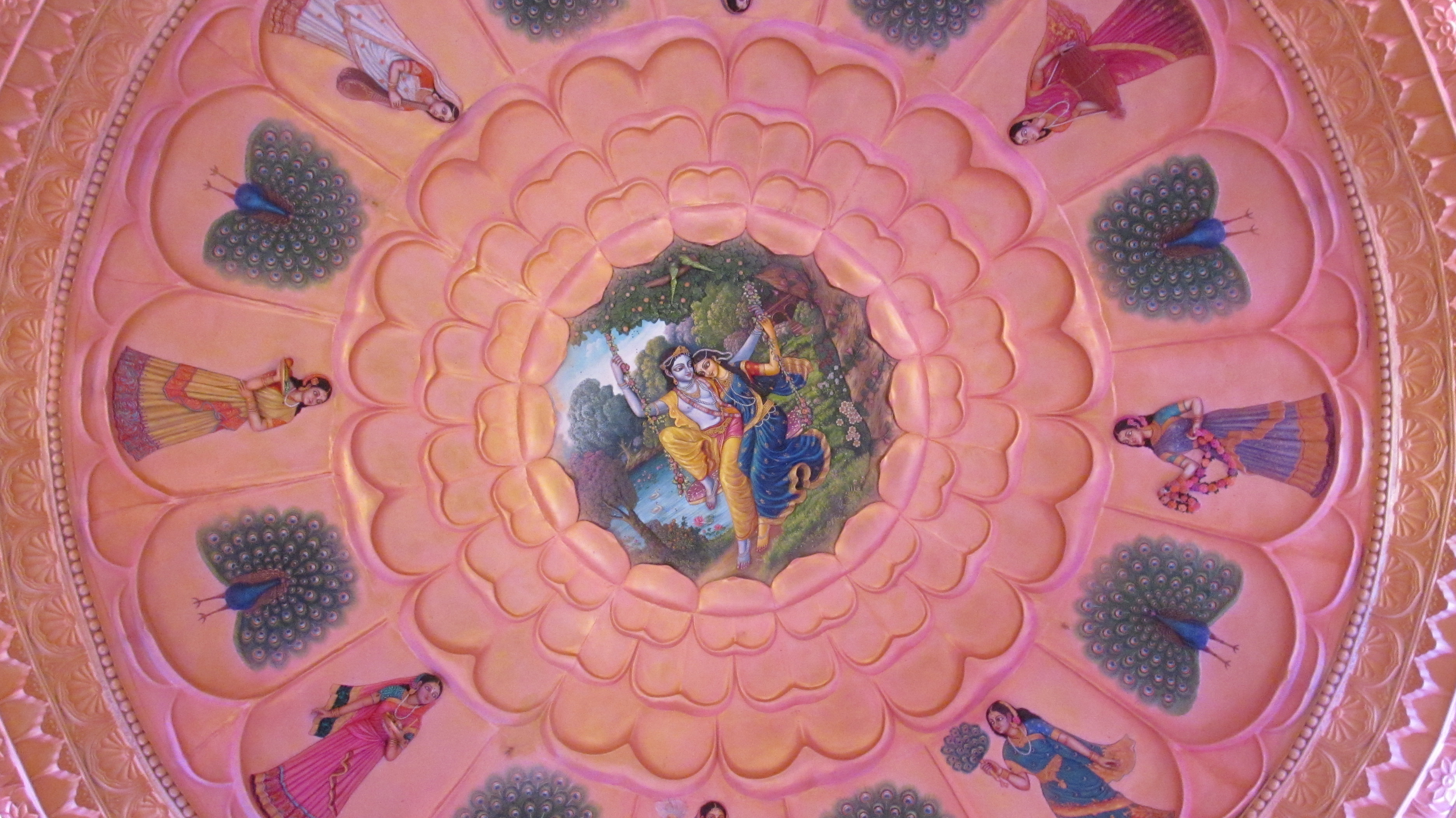
Art on the Dome inside the temple

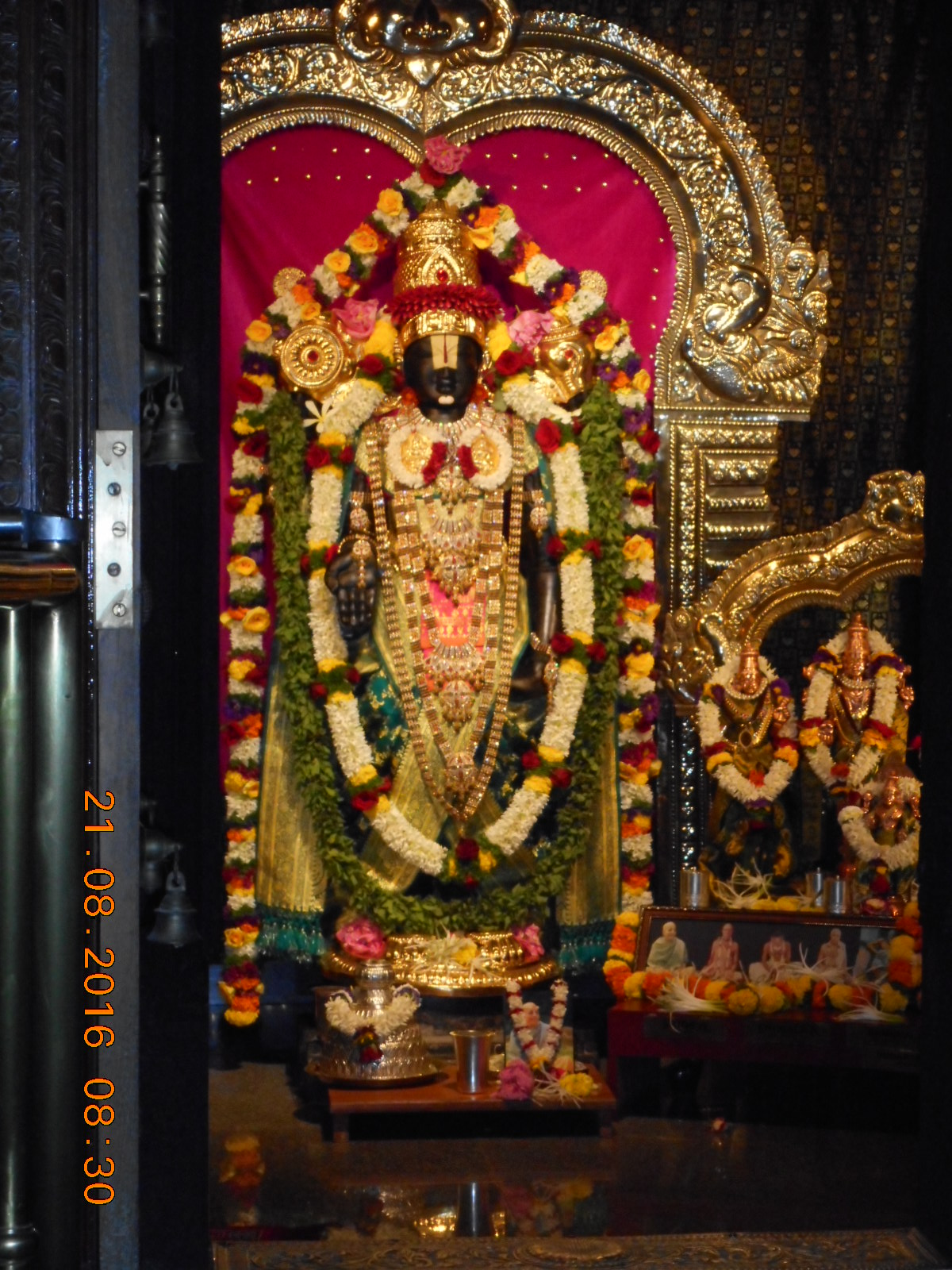
Lord Venkateswara in Iskcon Pune

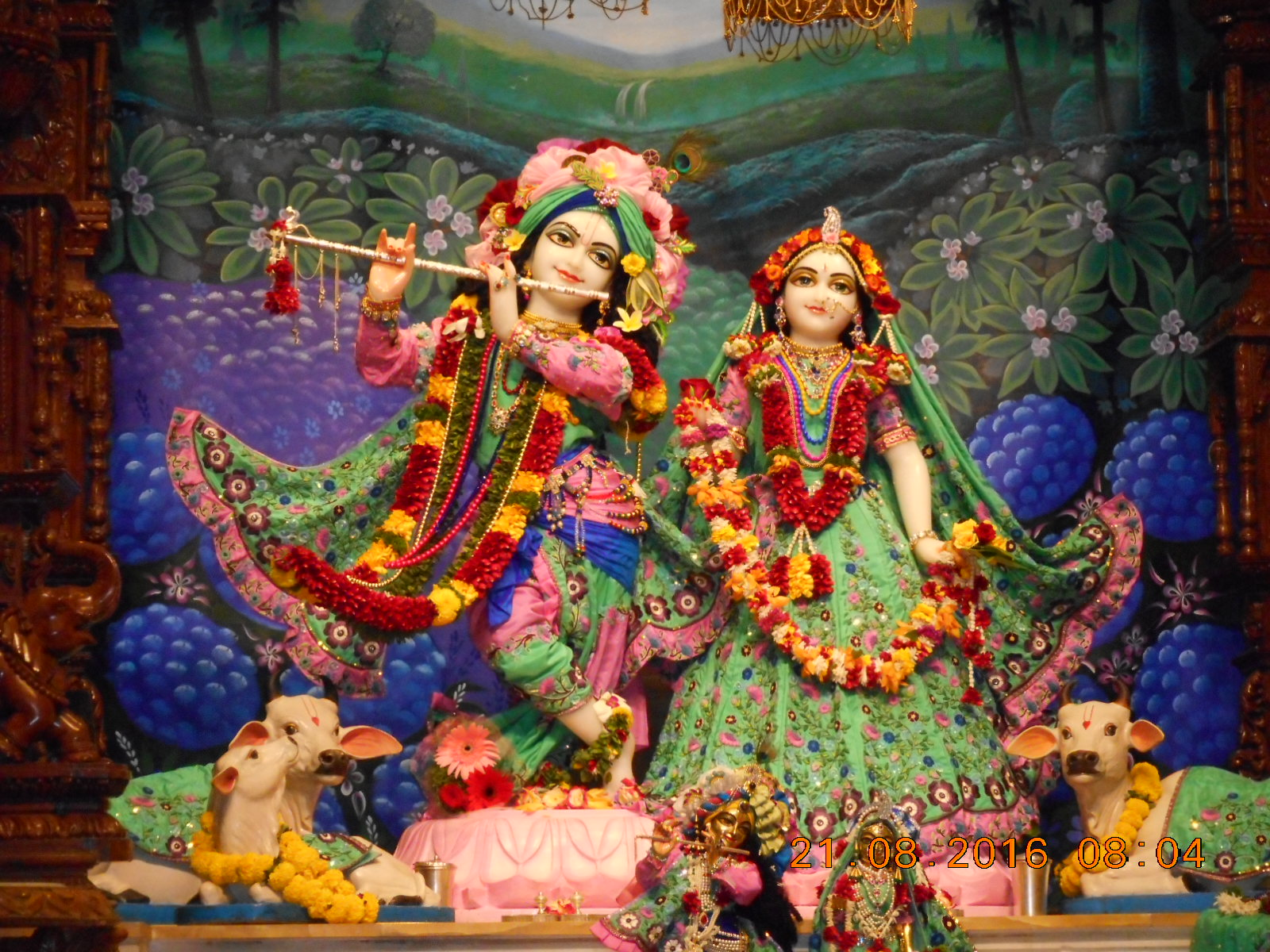
Radha Krishna at Central altar

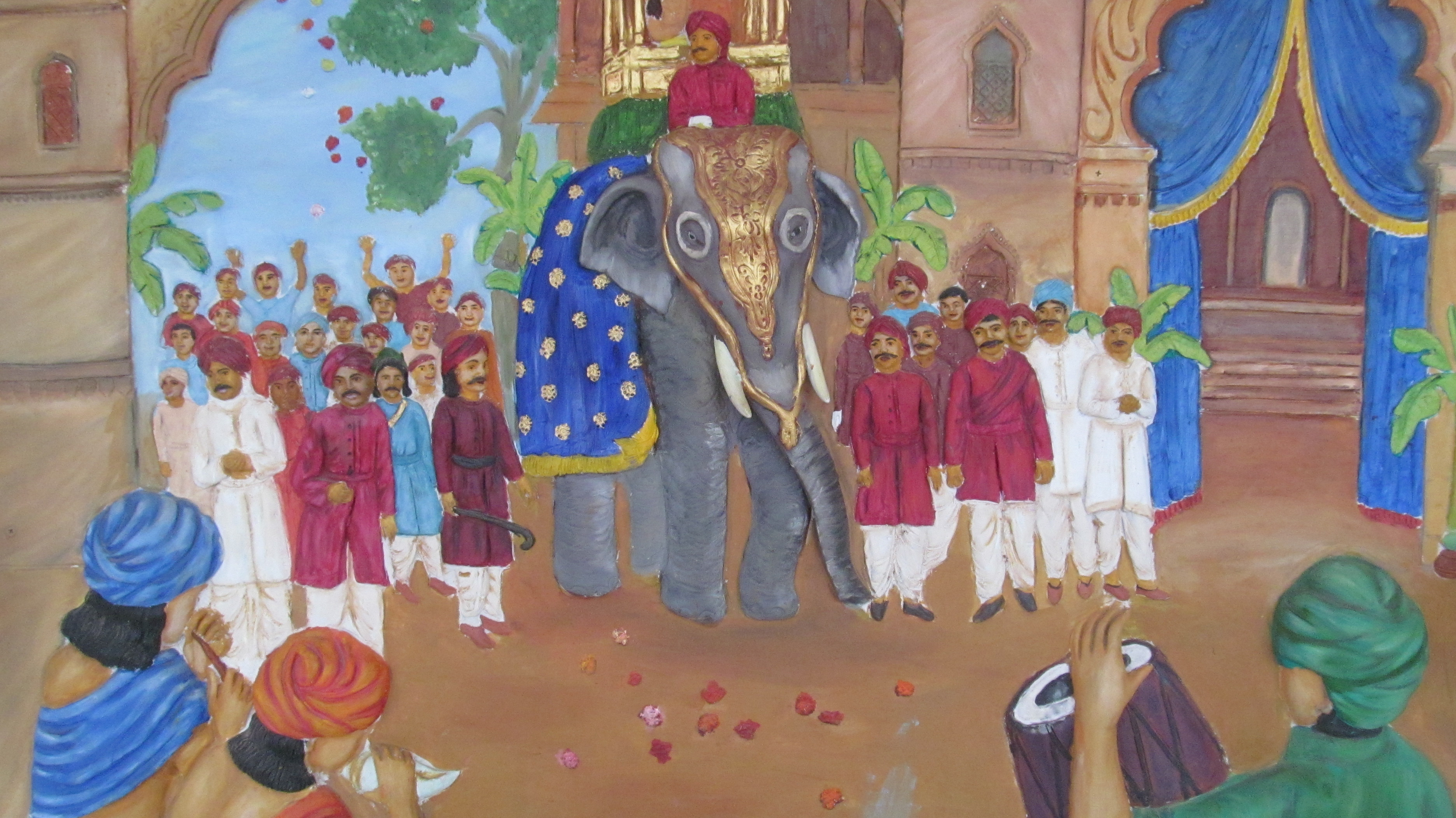
Art on the walls

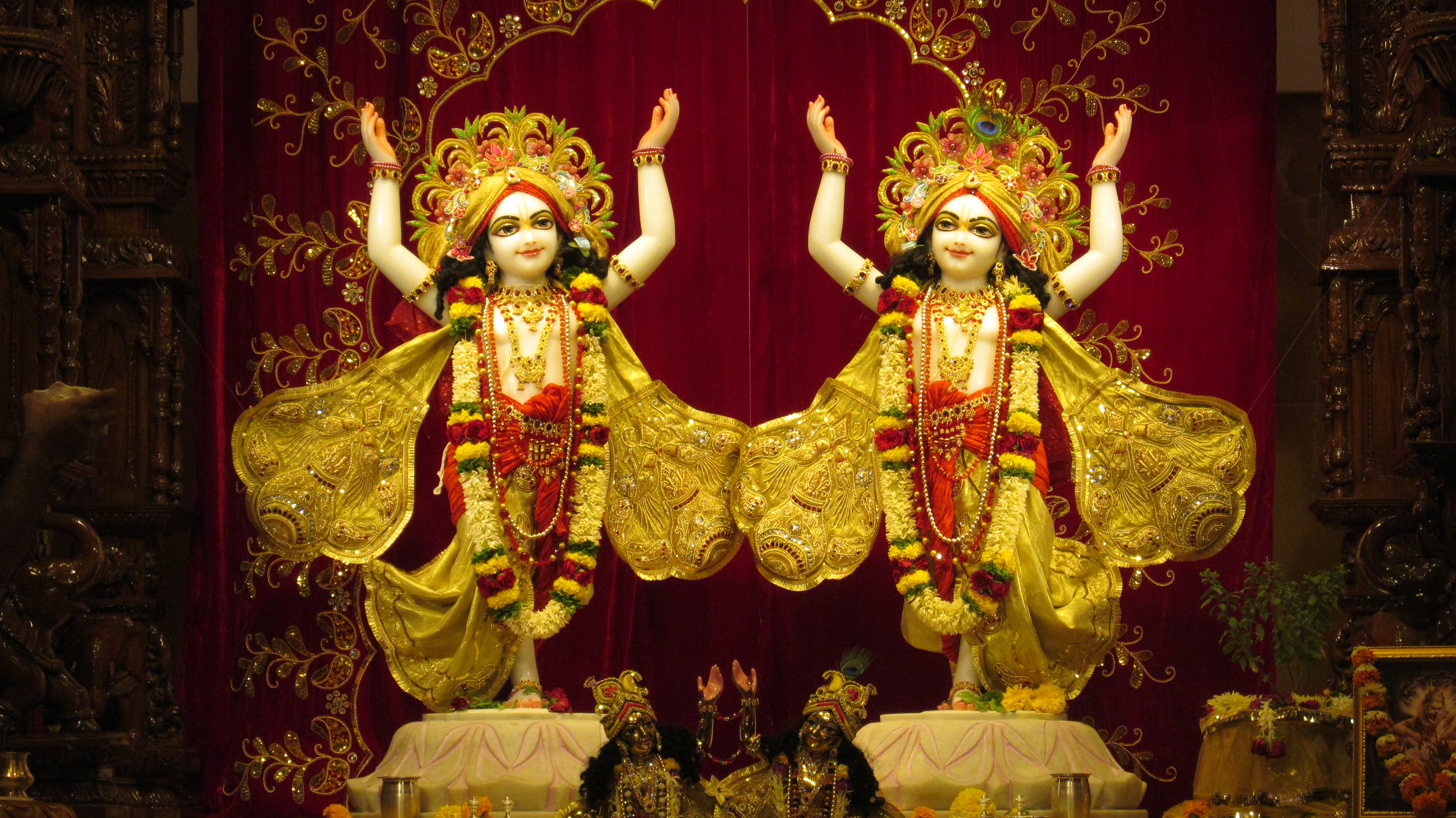
Deities of Gaura-Nitai
