= Rasa (theology) =

Creation and reception of a distinct 'flavor' or quality

Rasa (Sanskrit: रास, IAST: rāsa) refers to the creation and reception of a distinct 'flavor' or quality of something. As a Sanskrit theological concept, rasa was popularized by Krishna-centered bhakti traditions, such as Gaudiya Vaishnavism from the fifteenth century. The theological use of the word can be found early, about two thousand years before the Nimbarka or Chaitanya schools of bhakti, in 2.7.1 of the Taittiriya Upanishad: "Truly, the Lord is rasa" (raso vai sah) This statement expresses the view that God is the one who enjoys the ultimate rasa, or spiritual rapture and emotions.

It is believed Rupa Goswami developed, under the direct guidance of Caitanya, the articulated and formulated theology of rasa as "the soul's particular relationship with the divinity in devotional love". Rupa's text draws largely from the foundational theory of rasa formed by Bharata Muni, the originator of Sanskrit dramaturgy (perhaps as early as the 2nd century BCE). These relationships with the divinity in devotional love, rasa, are mapped after the variety of loving relationships that humans experience with one another, such as beloved-lover, friend-friend, parent-child, and master-servant. Rasas are distinguished as lower and higher and according to Bhagavad Gita it appears that the three higher rasas are acknowledged and preferred by Arjuna. The higher rasas are described as loving, friendly, and fraternal types of relationships.

== Etymology ==
The term "rasa" is derived from the Sanskrit language. In Sanskrit, "rasa" literally means "juice" or "essence". The concept of rasa originates from the Upanishads, specifically the Chandogya Upanisahad and Taittiriya Upanishad. Taittiriya Upanishad states "He is indeed rasa. Having obtained rasa this one becomes blissful.". Rasa signifies sap, juice, or essence, and is synonymous with pleasure and delight.

Rasa's earliest use in aesthetics appears in Bharata Muni's Natya Shastra, initially related to drama, particularly its poetic aspects. Early commentaries on the text were mostly lost, except for references in Abhinavagupta's 10th century commentary.

== Rupa Goswami ==
Rupa Goswami's interpretation of rasa transcends the concept of mere taste or aesthetic enjoyment. For him, rasa is an elevated spiritual experience attained through the spiritual body of a devotee (bhakta), rooted in the personal deity (Bhagavan). Rasa involves active participation in the divine lila, rather than being a passive spectator. In Bhakti-rasāmṛta-sindhu, Rupa Goswami presents Krishna as the embodiment of all rasas. Post-Abhinavgupta, rasas associated with non-romantic forms of love were proposed, notably vatsalya (tenderness), preyas (camaraderie), and prita (veneration). Vaishṇava thinkers began to consider bhakti (devotion) as a rasa, merging aesthetic and religious perspectives, a concept extensively explored by Rupa Goswami. Five primary rasas are emphasized by Rupa Goswami, which are centered around the devotee's relationship with the divine (Krishna):

- Santarasa: contemplative and passive love, arising from the soul's profound realization of its finite nature in contrast to the grandeur of the divine.
- Dasyarasa: affectionate love, involving a submissive stance from the soul, marking a transition from the distant adoration of Santarasa into active service while maintaining a formal bond.
- Sakhyarasa: friendship love, representing the soul's engagement with the divine on equal footing, akin to the affection shared in close friendships.
- Vatsalyarasa: nurturing love, evolving from the casual familiarity of Sakhyarasa into a more attentive and caring relationship.
- Srngararasa: passionate love, representing deepest level of love akin to the bond found in romantic relationships defined by complete devotion.

== Books ==
- Swami B.V. Tripurari, Rasa – Love Relationships in Transcendence. ISBN 1886069107
- Swami B.V. Tripurari, Jiva Goswami's Tattva-Sandarbha: Sacred India's Philosophy of Ecstasy
- Rupa Goswami, Nectar of Devotion (Bhakti-rasāmṛta-sindhu)

== See also ==
- Bhakti yoga
- Radha Krishna
- Sringara
- Turiya

== Bibliography ==
- Haberman, D. The Bhaktirasāmṛtasindhu of Rūpa Gosvāmin, Indira Gandhi National Centre for the Arts and Motilal Banarsidass Publishers, Delhi, 2003.
- Massey, Reginald (2004). India's Dances: Their History, Technique, and Repertoire. Abhinav Publications. ISBN 978-8170174349.
- Schweig, G.M. (2005). Dance of divine love: The Rasa Lila of Krishna from the Bhagavata Purana, India's classic sacred love story. Princeton University Press. ISBN 0691114463.
