= Sri Kunj Bihari Temple =

Hindu temple dedicated to Radha Krishna in Malaysia

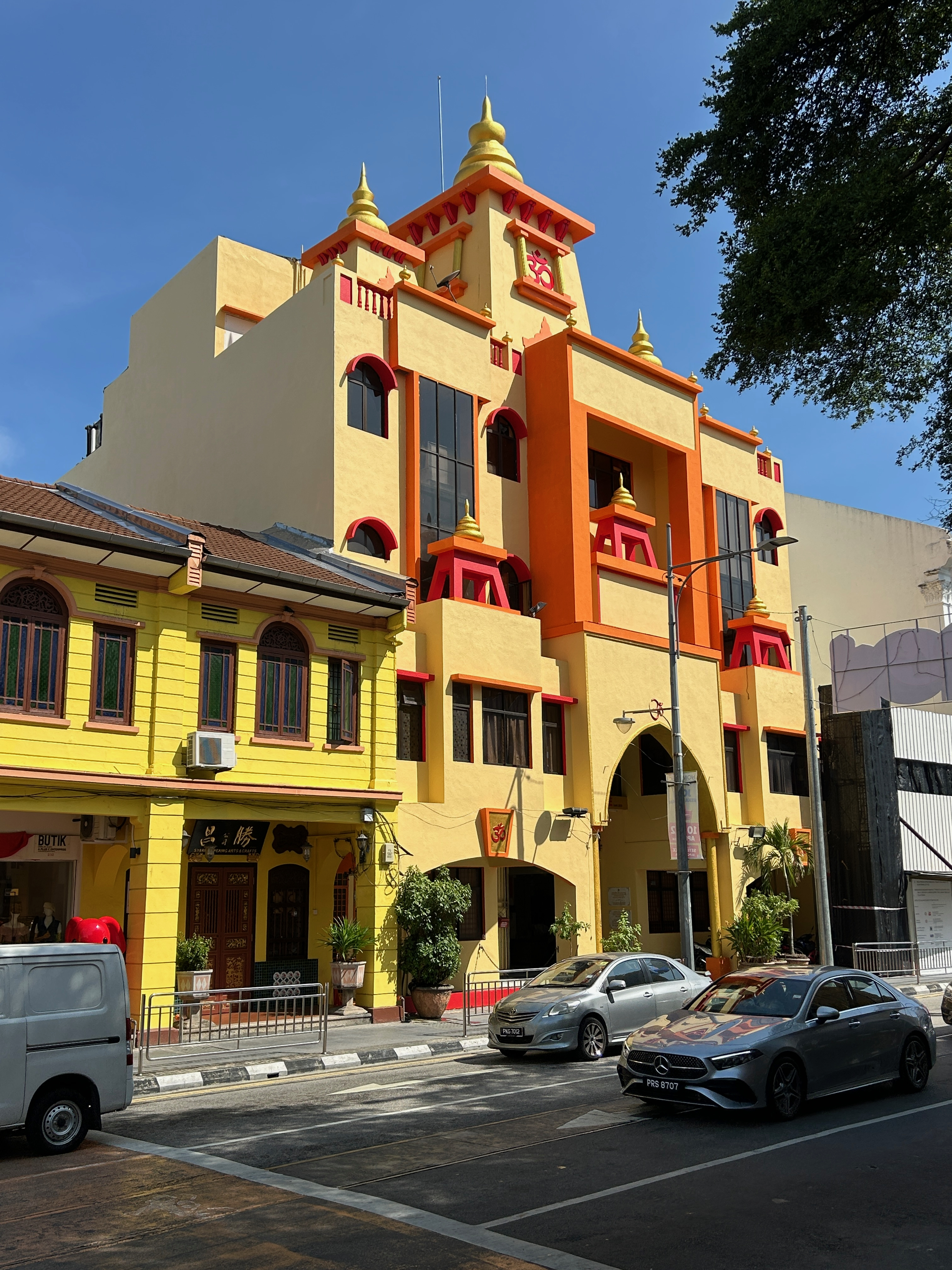

- Location within George Town

Religion
- Affiliation: Hinduism
- Deity: Radha Krishna
- Festivals: Krishna Janmashtami, Radhashtami, Holi
- Status: Active

Location
- Location: Penang Road, George Town
- State: Penang
- Country: Malaysia
- Interactive map of Sri Kunj Bihari Temple
- Coordinates: 5°25′9.5514″N 100°19′54.9114″E

Architecture
- Established: 1835

Website
- http://www.skbtpenang.com

Sri Kunj Bihari Temple is a Hindu temple within George Town in the Malaysian state of Penang. Established in 1835, it is the oldest Vaishnava temple in the state. It is dedicated to Krishna, who is worshiped in the form of Kunj Bihari with his chief consort Radha at the temple's central sanctum.

== History ==
Among residents of Penang, this temple is also known as Krishna Mandir or Thakorwadi. The earliest version of the structure is believed to have been built on this spot in the 1830s. It was built with an endowment from Hindus in Bihar, North India.

During the foundation years of George Town's urban development, the area favoured by North Indian traders was around Beach, Bishop, Penang and Chulia Streets. However, this temple is further west, along Penang Road, in an area which was then more associated with Malarbri Indians from the south.

== A religious centre ==
Sri Kunj Bihari Temple serves as a Hindu religious centre for the Bengali, Gujarati, Punjabi, Marwari and Sindhi subethnic communities of Penangite Indians. The Temple is administered by The Penang Hindu Endowments Board (PHEB). The current Commissioner of the Temple is Markend D Joshi. The nearby Sri Bahari Road takes its name from this temple, although the spelling is slightly different.
