= Radha Ramana =

Combined form of Radha Krishna and one of the epithets of Krishna

Coordinates: 27°35′01″N 77°41′45″E

Drawing of the image of Radha Ramana, believed to be a combined form of Radha-Krishna

Radha Ramana (Sanskrit: राधारमण, romanized: rādhāramaṇa) is one of the three combined forms of the Hindu deities Radha and Krishna. The other two forms are Banke Bihari and Radha-Vallabha. Radha Ramana is typically adorned with feathers, a crown, a yellow dress, and a shining vaijayanti-mala (garland) on his chest. He is regarded to wear ornaments in his ears and a shining tilaka on his forehead.

Radha Ramana Temple, one of the ancient temples of Vrindavan, is dedicated to Radha Ramana. According to Gaudiya tradition, Radha Ramana was manifested by the saint Gopala Bhatta Goswami in the 16th century.

== Etymology ==
Radha Ramana is an epithet of Krishna as the lover (ramana) of Radha.

== Literature ==
The appearance of the Radha Ramana is described by Gopala Bhatta Goswami biographer, Narahari, in a mere four verses (Bhakti Ratnakara 4.315–319). Narahari Chakravarti puzzles at Krishnadasa's near silence over Gopala Bhatta. He concludes that Gopala Bhatta requested his junior, Krishnadasa Kaviraja, to be omitted from the book out of humility (1.222–223). Unlike other biographies of Chaitanya, Chaitanya Charitamrita describes Chaitanya's tour of South India, including his visit to Srirangam and residing with the temple priest Venkata Bhatta (Chaitanya Charitamrita 2.9.82–165)

== Temples ==
=== Radha Ramana Temple, Vrindavan ===
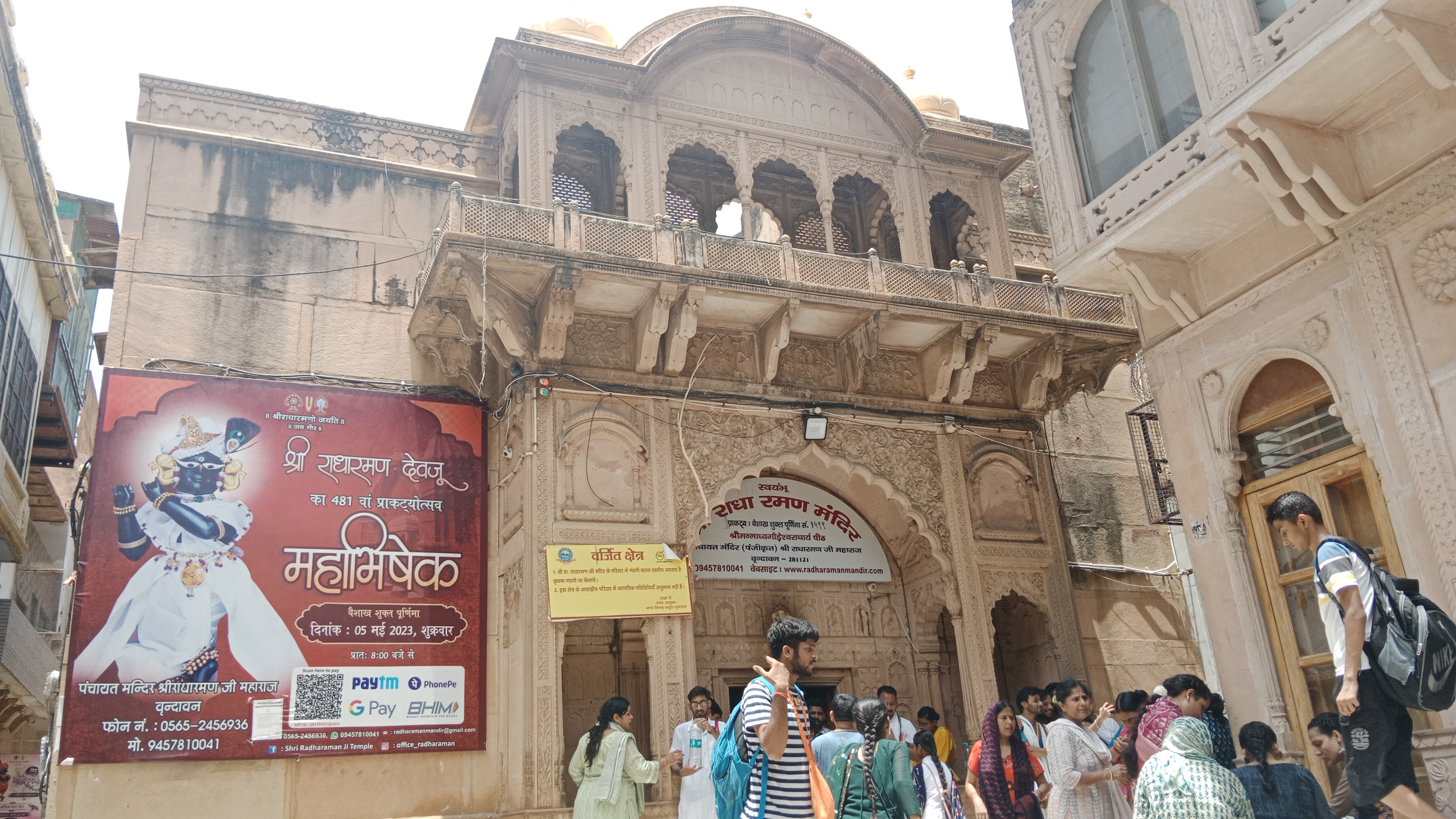
Radha Ramana Temple, Vrindavan

The historic Radha Ramana Temple recently celebrated its 500th anniversary. It attracts both local worshippers and pilgrims. The image housed in the temple is the oldest image remaining in Vrindavan for the longest continuous period; it remained in Vrindavan during the iconoclastic raids by Mughal emperor Aurangzeb during the 17th century, when other images were removed to be hidden in safer places outside the city. Performances of classical Indian devotional music are offered nightly at the temple.

=== Shri Swaminarayan Mandir, Junagadh ===
The primary deity of Shri Swaminarayan Mandir in Junagadh, Radha Krishna, is worshipped as Radha Ramana. This temple belongs to the Swaminarayan Sampradaya, and was built under the guidance of Swaminarayan.

== History ==
Chaitanya Mahaprabhu came to Ranga Kshetra in 1511 and stayed at Venkata's home. Venkata Bhatta had two brothers, Tirumalla Bhatta and Prabodhananda Sarasvati. They all belonged to the Sri Vaishnava tradition and Prabodhananda Sarasvati was a tridandi sannyasi of that order. Venkata Bhatta had a son named Gopala, who was then just a child.

Gopala Bhatta Goswami was a son of a priest of Srirangam. Venkata and his two brothers, Gopala's uncles Trimalla and Prabodhananda Sarasvati "were converted from their Sri Vaishnava faith in Lakshmi-Narayana as supreme to one in Radha Krishna" as Svayam Bhagavan. The dialogue of this conversion is recorded in the biography Chaitanya Charitamrita by Krishnadasa Kaviraja.

In the second volume of the Chaitanya Charitamrita, a presentation is given, with a reference to the particular verse of the tenth canto of the Bhagavata Purana as to the reason why Lakshmi, also known as Sri, (thus the name of Sri Sampradaya) is burning with desire and still not capable of entering to the realm of Vrindavana.

Prabodhananda Sarasvati is regarded to have accepted the supremacy of Radha worship from Chaitanya.

Being pleased with Gopala Bhatta's sincere service and devotion, Chaitanya Mahaprabhu initiated him, and ordered him to move to Vrindavana after the death of his parents and perform bhajans and rites. He instructed him to serve his mother and father and always engage in chanting Krishna's glories.

At the age of thirty Gopala Bhatta came to Vrindavana. After Chaitanya Mahaprabhu disappeared, Gopala Bhatta felt intense separation from Krishna. To relieve his devotee, Krishna is believed to have instructed Gopala Bhatta in a dream: "If you want my darshan [visit] then make a trip to Nepal."

In Nepal, Gopala Bhatta bathed in the Kali-Gandaki River. Upon dipping his waterpot in the river, he was surprised to see twelve shaligramas enter his pot. He dropped them back into the river, but they re-entered his pot when he refilled it. Later, a wealthy man came to Vrindavana and offered Gopala Bhatta a charity of clothing and ornaments in exchange for his shaligramas. However, Gopala Bhatta couldn't use these ornaments as his round-shaped shaligramas, so he advised the donor to give them to someone else. It is believed that donor refused to take back the clothing and ornaments, and Gopala Bhatta kept both the donations and his shaligramas.

In the evening of the purnima (full moon), after offering to his shaligramas, Gopala Bhatta put them to rest, covering them with a wicker basket. In the early morning, he bathed in the Yamuna river. Upon returning and uncovering the shaligramas for a puja, he saw amongst them an image of Krishna playing a flute. The "Damodara shila" had manifested as the beautiful three-fold bending form of tri-bhangananda-krishna. In this way Radha Ramana emerged in a perfectly shaped deity form from a sacred fossilized shaligrama stone. Devotees consider this image to be alive and that Radha Ramana grants a chosen family the privilege of assisting him in his daily schedule. In this way "the Lord has granted his wish and the stone was turned into a deity murti of Sri Krishna". As a narrative account of actualized Krishna-bhakti, Radha Ramana's appearance story highlights the divine-human relationship of love as the ontologically central category of ultimate reality.

== See also ==
- Achyuta
- Gopala
- Gopinath
- Hari
- Keshava
- Madhava
- Vāsudeva

== Sources ==
- Anand, D. (1992). Krishna: The Living God of Braj. Abhinav Publications. ISBN 978-81-7017-280-2.
- Valpey, Kenneth Russell (2006). Attending Kṛṣṇa's image: Caitanya Vaiṣṇava mūrti-sevā as devotional truth. New York: Routledge. ISBN 0-415-38394-3.
