= Govind Dev Ji Temple =

Historic Radha Krishna temple in Jaipur

Govind Dev Ji Temple (Jaipur)
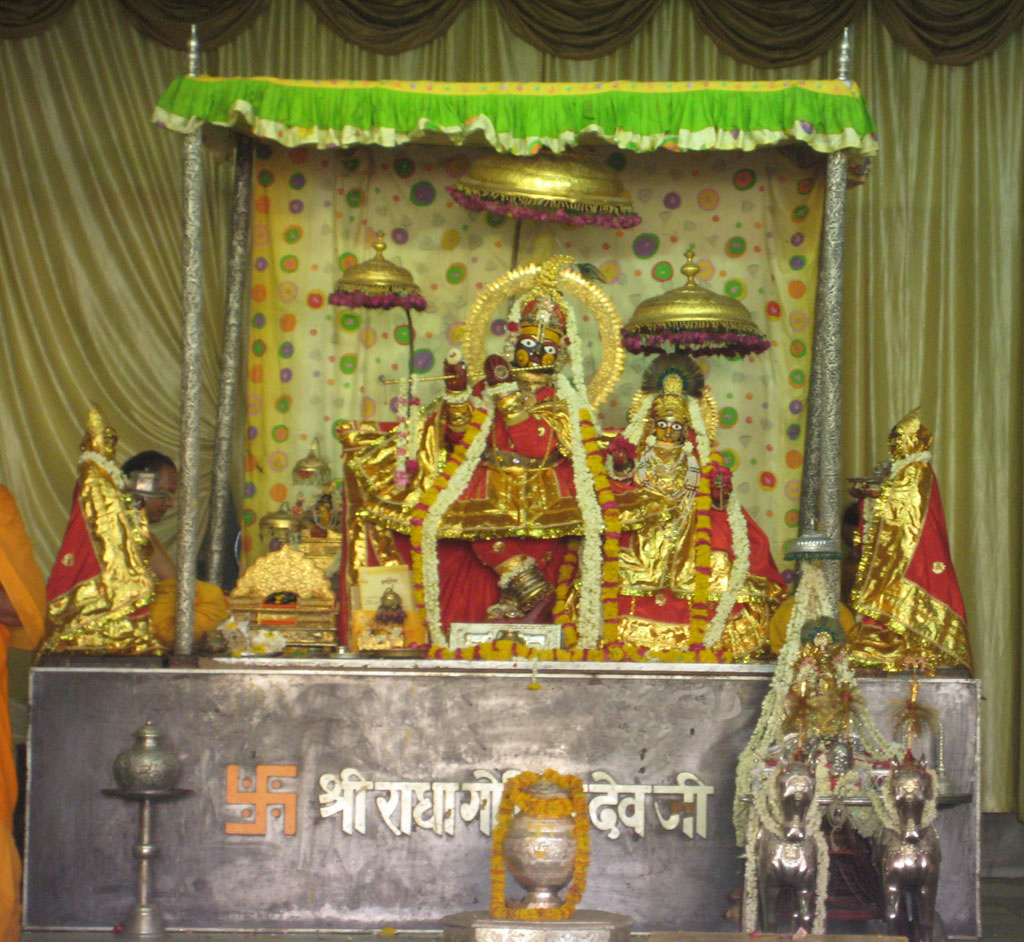
- Radha Govind idols at the central sanctum of the temple

- Location within Jaipur Location within Rajasthan Location within India

Religion
- Affiliation: Hinduism
- District: Jaipur
- Deity: Radha Govind
- Festivals: Janmashtami, Radhashtami, Holi, Gopashtami, Sharad Purnima, Kartik Purnima

Location
- Location: Jaipur
- State: Rajasthan
- Country: India
- Coordinates: 26.9288302°N 75.8239547°E

Architecture
- Creator: Maharaja Jai Singh II

Website
- mandirshrigovinddevjijaipur.org

The Govind Dev Ji Temple is a significant Hindu temple dedicated to Radha and Krishna, located within the City Palace complex, in Jaipur, Rajasthan, India. The temple was established in the 18th century by Maharaja Jai Singh II, the founder of Jaipur, who brought the deities from Vrindavan.

The Govind Dev icon is counted among the seven principal Goswami deities of Vrindavan and is associated in tradition with Rupa Goswami, one of the Six Goswamis of Vrindavan.

== History ==
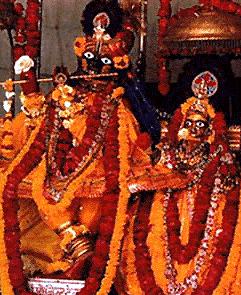
Radha Krishna at Govind Dev Ji Temple

The idol of Govind Dev Ji is traditionally believed to have been created by Bajranabh, the great-grandson of Krishna. According to legend, Bajranabh created three images of Krishna: one representing his feet, one his chest, and one his face. The first image is known as Lord Madan Mohan Ji, the second image is called Gopinath Ji, and the third image is popular with the name of Govind Dev Ji.

The icons were rediscovered by Rupa Goswami. He built the first permanent Govind Dev temple in Vrindavan around 1535 at the yogapitha, the ritual centre of the town understood in Gaudiya theology as the meeting place of Krishna and Radha. According to the custodians' tradition, he had 'discovered' the self-manifested image at a mound called Gomatila in 1525.

A farman of Emperor Akbar dated 6 October 1568 formally recognised Jiva Goswami as manager (adhikar) of the Govind Dev and Madan Mohan temples, indicating that both had come under a single Chaitanya-sect administration by that date.

The temple is historically significant as the site where Baladeva Vidyabhushana, an important philosopher of the Gaudiya Vaishnavism tradition, composed the Govinda Bhashya, a commentary on the Brahma Sutras, after receiving guidance in a dream from the deity Govind Dev Ji.

The idols were originally enshrined at a palatial 7-storeyed temple in Vrindavan, constructed by Mansingh I of Amber, with red sandstone being donated by the Mughal Emperor Akbar & consecrated by Jiva Goswami in 1570. Man Singh's reconstruction is dated to 1590, a date preserved in an inscription on the temple; the Amber court's patronage of the Chaitanya establishment at Vrindavan is documented from at least 1565.

However in 1670, when Vrindavan was sacked on the orders of Aurangzeb, the icons were removed to their current location. Historian Monika Horstmann observes that the sactuary of Govind Dev temple although not destroyed was dismantled and figures on the doorway of the jagmohan defaced, but the building otherwise survived. An inscription dates the removal of the images to August 1670; the deities were taken first to Kaman in Kachavaha territory, together with the divine consort and the tutelary goddess Vrindadevi.

The relocation to Jaipur was not immediate but unfolded over nearly seven decades of successive halts across Kachavaha territory. In 1713, Sawai Jai Singh II laid out the garden of Kanak vrindavan (Golden Vrindaban) on the shore of the Mansarovar reservoir as the deity's new abode, and regular worship was established there from 1719.The deity was then moved it to a building in the newly laid-out gardens behind his royal palace, where a permanent temple was later built. Jai Singh's own palace was named Chandra Mahala (Moon Palace) and the Govind Dev shrine Surya Mahala (Sun Palace), the two placed in symbolic relation to each other. When Govind Dev was installed at Surya Mahala in 1727, Jai Singh declared the deity to be the sovereign of the state of Amera and Jaipur, and himself only the deity's chief minister — a ritual constitution the Kachhwaha rulers continued to observe until Rajasthan joined the Indian Union.

== Guinness World Record ==
The temple's Satsang Hall holds the Guinness World Record for being the world's widest concrete building. Designed and constructed by Jaipur-based structural engineering firm N M Roof Designers (NMRD) Ltd, the Satsang Hall features a reinforced concrete cement (RCC) flat roof with a single span of 119 feet. The 15,800 square feet pillarless hall can accommodate 5,000 devotees at any given time. The design employed a grid or waffle slab a criss-cross square grid of deep ribs to support the expansive roof structure. This architectural feat was recognized by the Guinness World Records in 2009.

== Worship and Daily Rituals ==
The temple conducts daily rituals, including seven aartis (ritualistic prayers) and bhog offerings to the deities. These are performed at specific times throughout the day, and devotees visit the temple regularly to receive darshan (sight of the deity).

Govind Dev occupies a paramount position in Kachavaha court ritual: at the coronation of a new Jaipur Maharaja, the king renders obeisance first to Govind Dev.

Major festivals such as Janmashtami, Radhashtami, and Holi see an increase in the number of visitors.

== Aarti and Darshan Timings ==
आरती (Aarti)	समय (Time)
Mangla	5:00 to 5:15 AM
Dhoop	7:45 to 9:00 AM
Shringar	9:30 to 10:15 AM
Rajbhog	10:45 to 11:45 AM
Gwal	5:00 to 5:15 PM
Sandhya	5:45 to 6:45 PM
Shayan	8:00 to 8:15 PM

== Management ==
The spiritual and administrative activities of the Govind Dev Ji Temple are overseen by Mahant Anjan Kumar Goswami. He has been serving as the head priest (महंत) for several decades, maintaining the traditional "seva" (service) system and overseeing major festivals and temple administration. Under his leadership, the temple has also embraced modern initiatives like live darshan streaming.

== Festivals ==
The Govind Dev Ji Temple is an important center for the celebration of various Hindu festivals, including Janmashtami (the birth of Krishna), Radhashtami (the birth of Radha), Gopashtami, and others. These festivals are marked by special prayers, ceremonies, and events that attract a large number of devotees.

== Temple Gallery ==
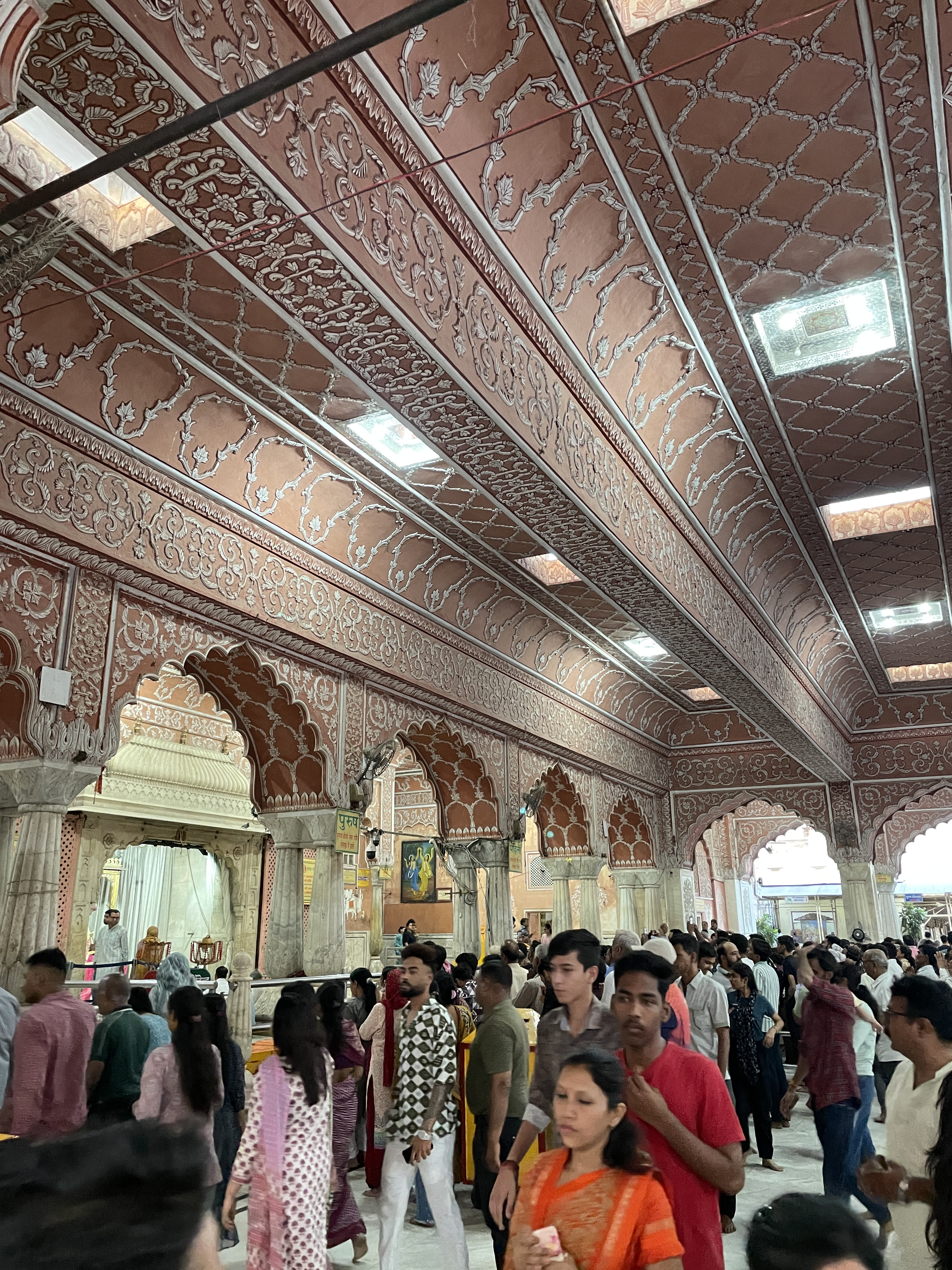
Inner view of Govind Dev Ji Temple

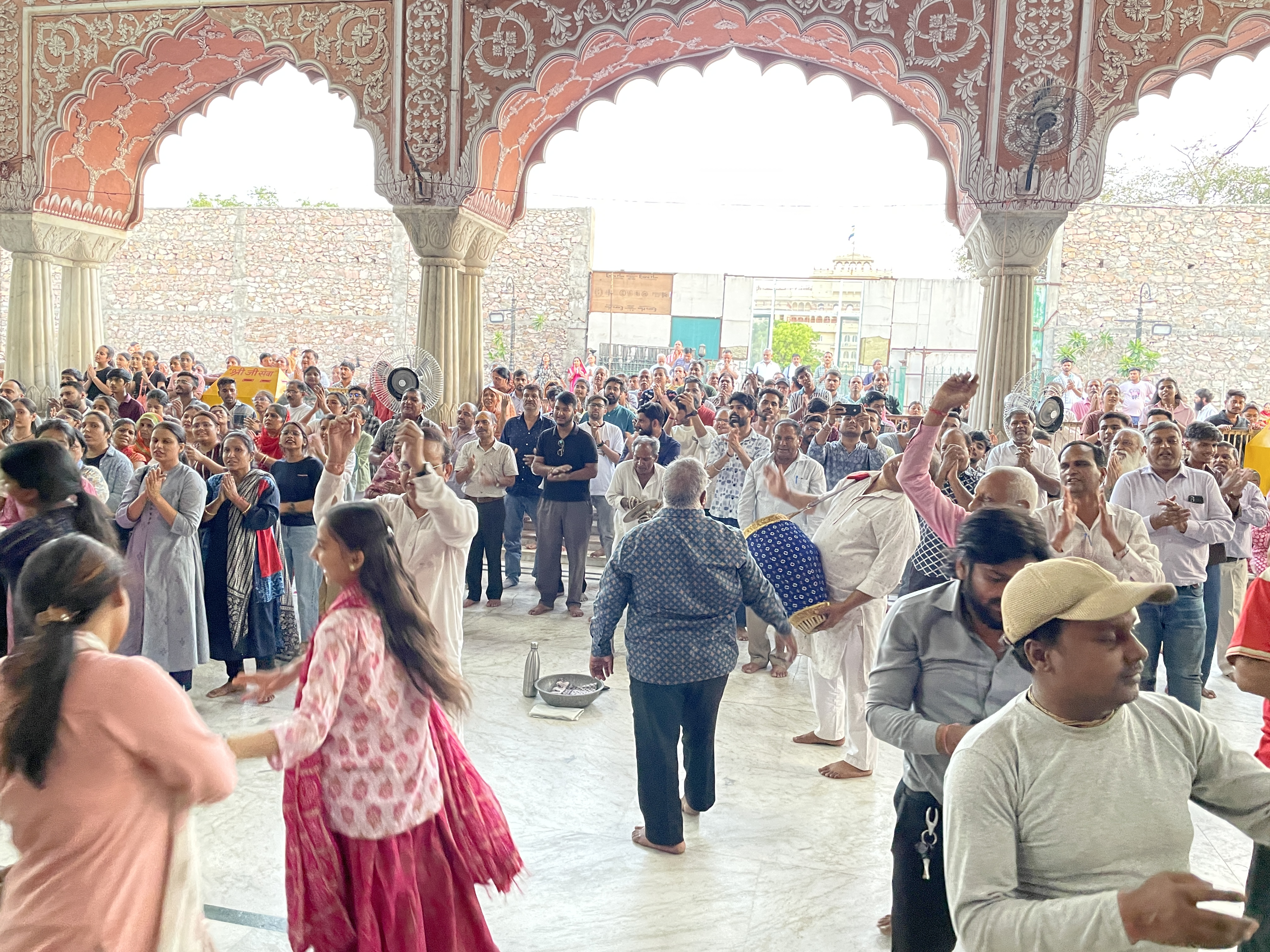
Devotees gathering for satsang inside the temple

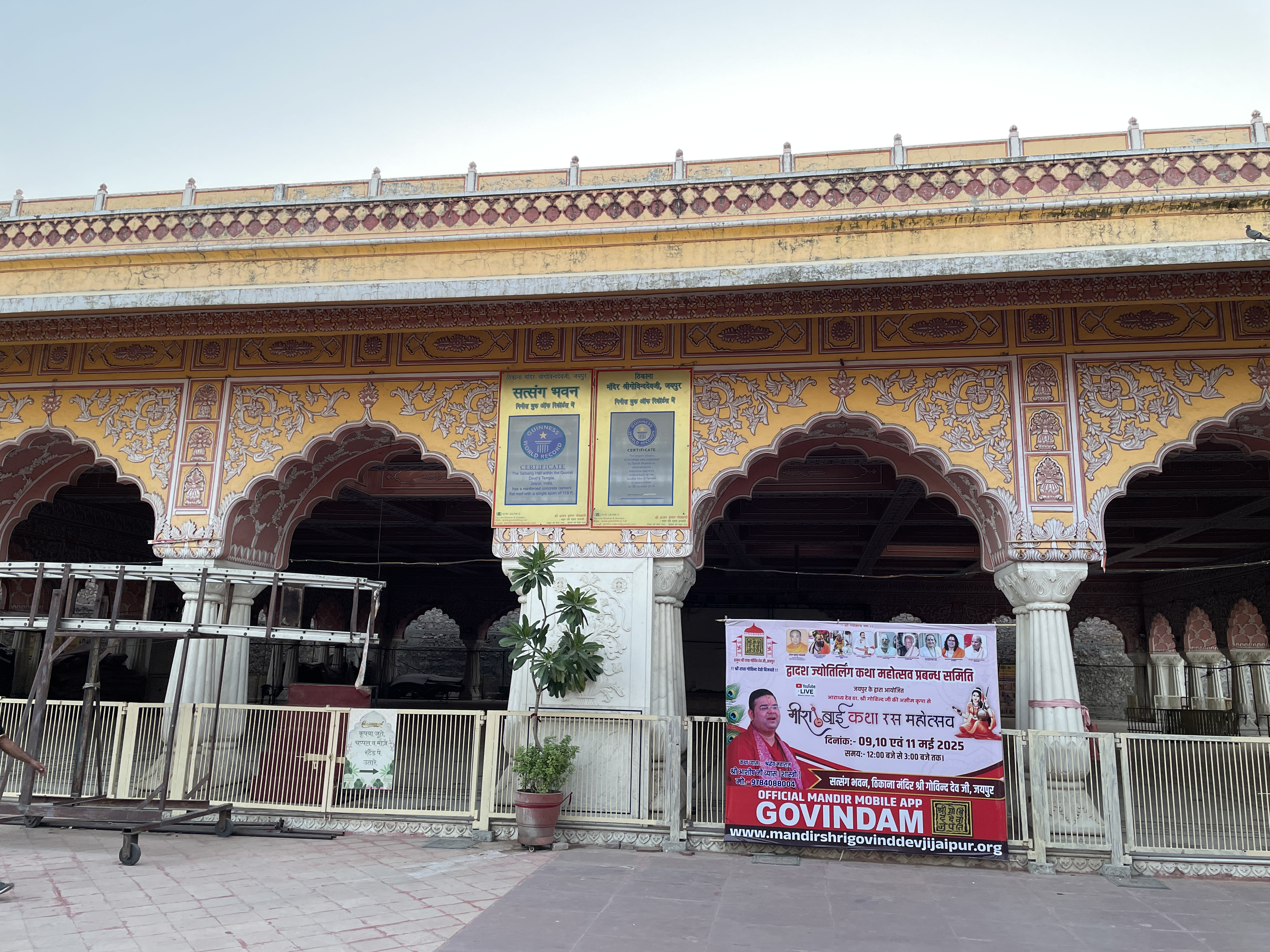
View of the Satsang Hall

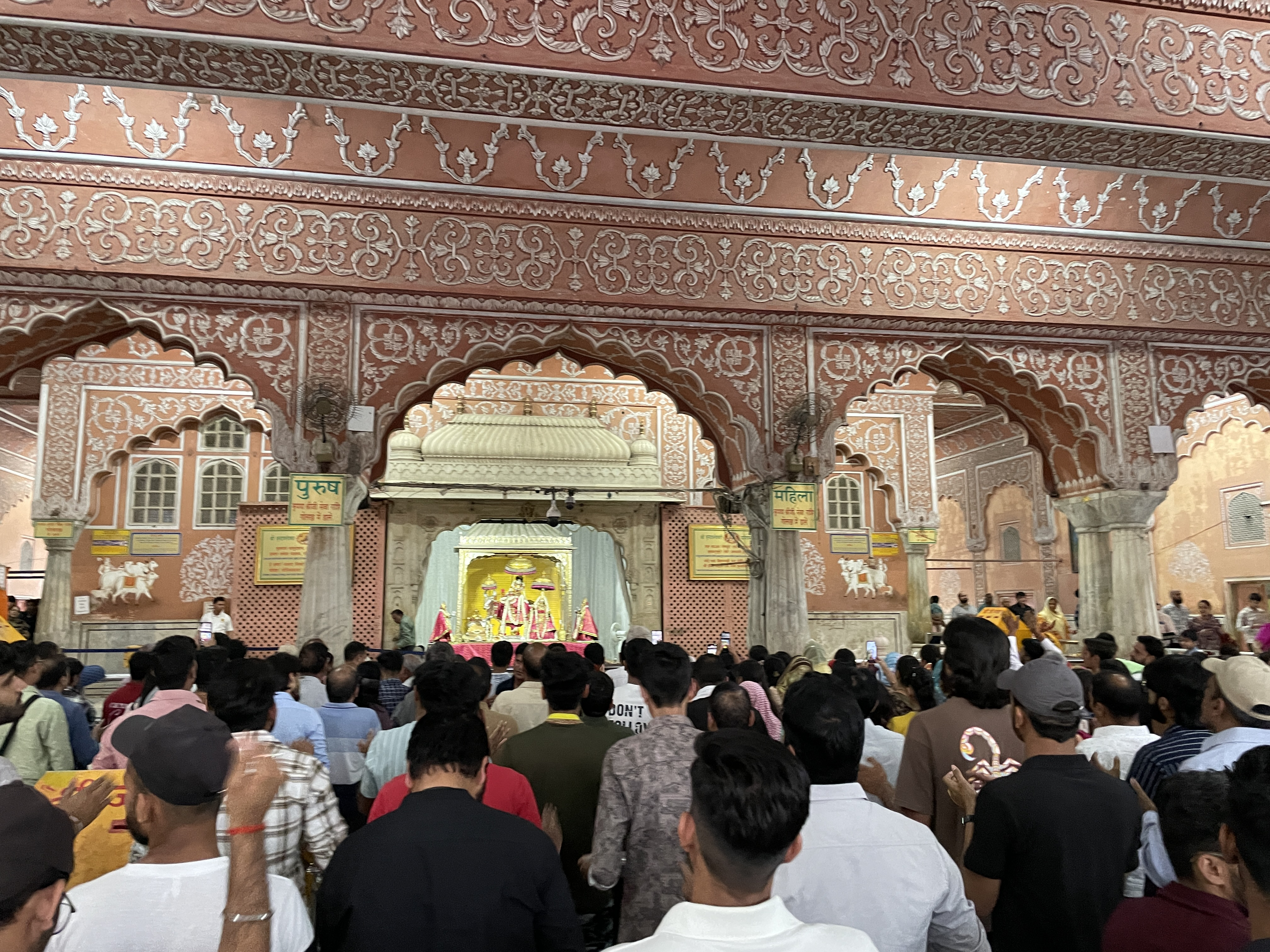
Another inner view of the temple

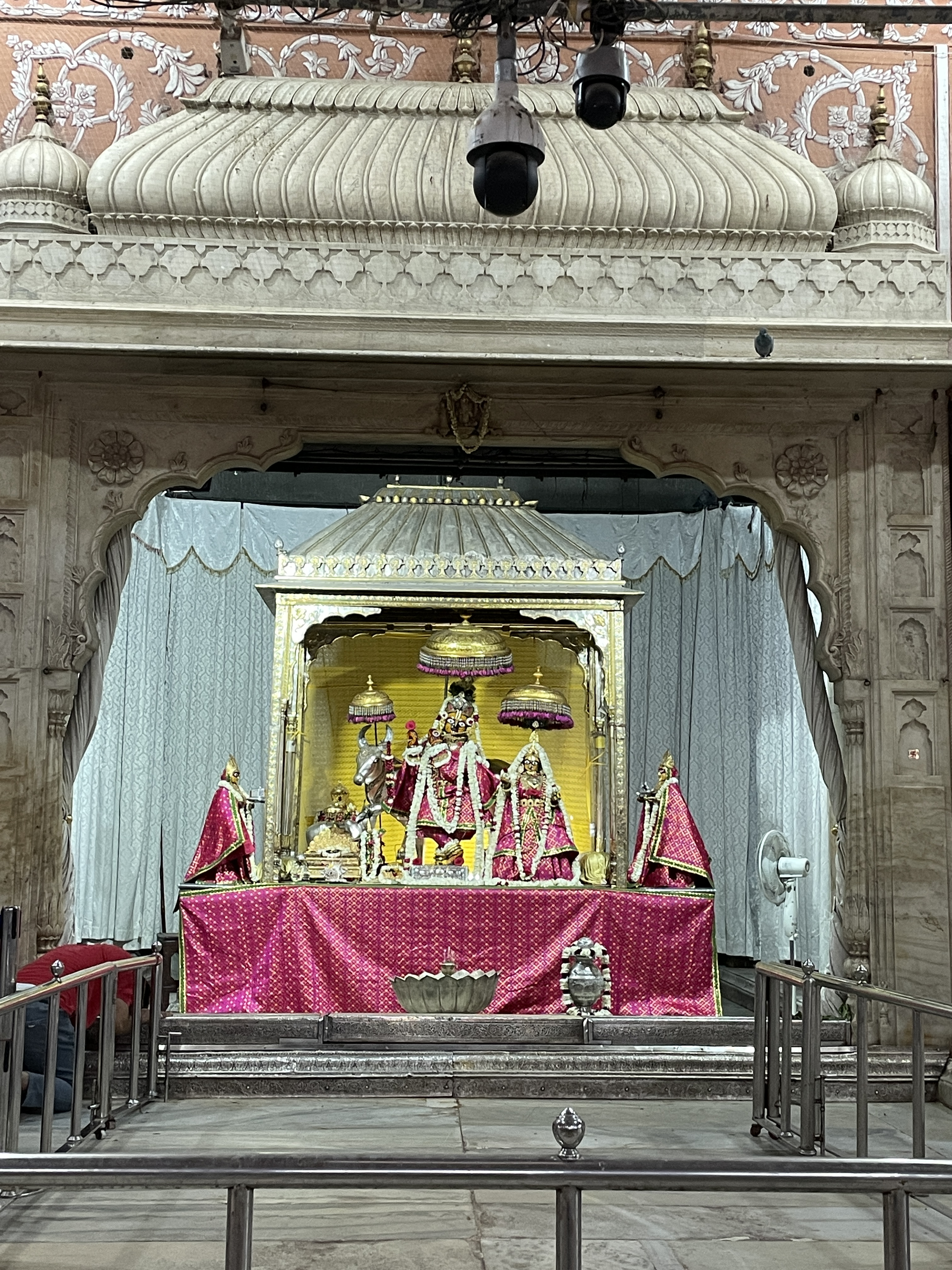
Idols of Govind Dev Ji and Radha Ji

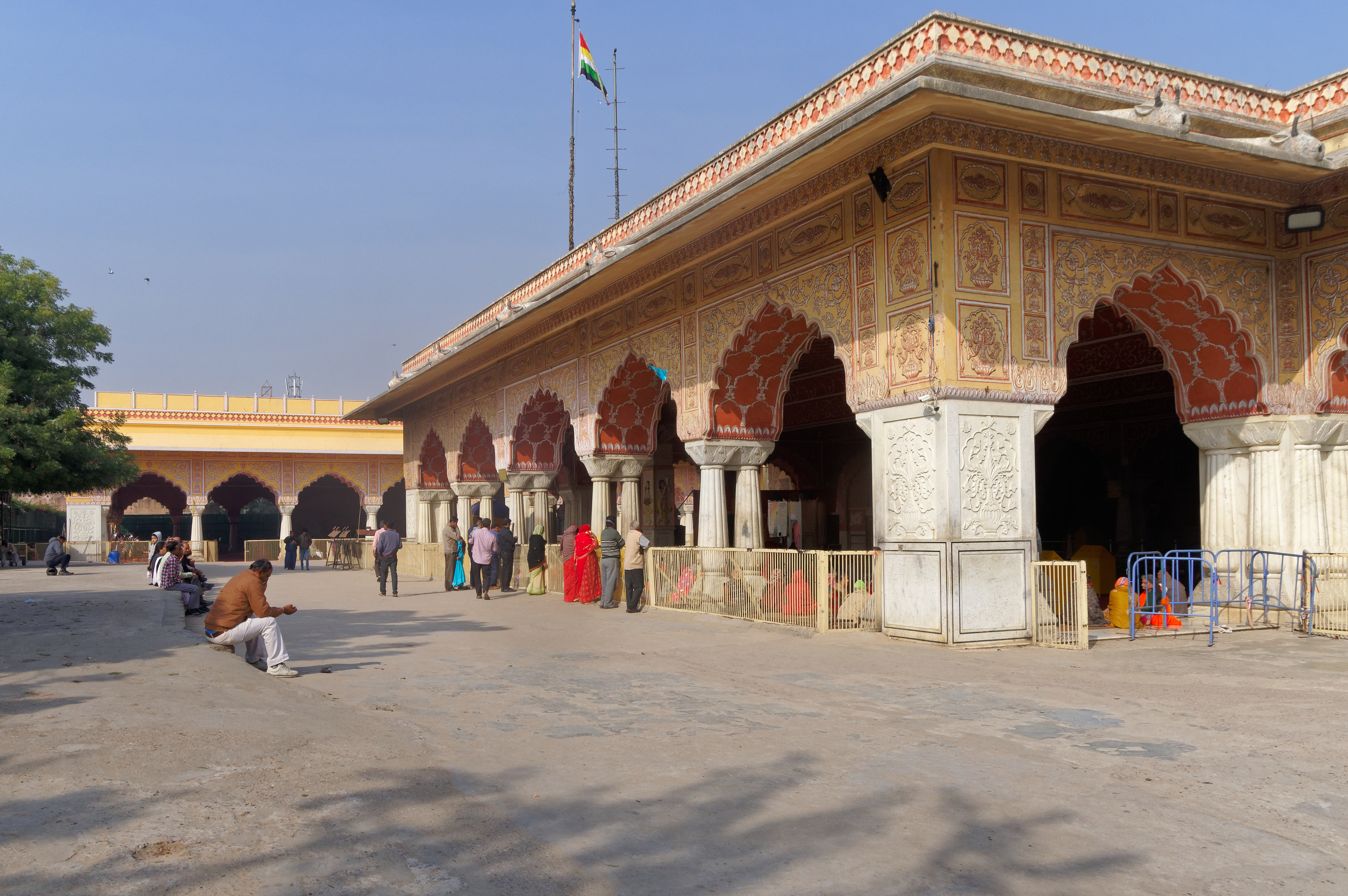
Exterior of Radha Govind Dev Ji Temple, Jaipur

== See also ==
- Madan Mohan Temple, Karauli
- Radha Krishna
- Gopinath Ji Temple, Jaipur
- Khole Ke Hanuman Ji Temple
