= Svayam Bhagavan =

Concept in Hinduism

Svayam Bhagavan (Sanskrit: स्वयं भगवान्, romanized: Svayaṁ-Bhagavān; roughly: "God Itself") is a Sanskrit concept in Hinduism, referring to the absolute representation of Bhagavan (the title "Lord" or "God") as the Supreme God in a monotheistic framework. The concept is most commonly (but not always) associated with a male deity, for instance in Hindu sub-movements like Krishnaism and Gaudiya Vaishnavism, in which Krishna is regarded as Svayam Bhagavan.

== Description ==
Svayam Bhagavan is a term most often used in Gaudiya Vaishnava and other Krishna-centered traditions, where it is used to designate Krishna. Other usages of the term appear in the Bhagavata Purana and in different Vaishnava traditions. Traditions of Gaudiya Vaishnavas, the Nimbarka Sampradaya and followers of Vallabha consider him to be the source of all avatars, and the source of Vishnu and Narayana. This belief is drawn primarily from the "famous statement" of the Bhagavatam (1.3.28).

A different viewpoint differing from this theological concept is the concept of Krishna as an avatar of Narayana or Vishnu. It should be however noted that although it is usual to speak of Vishnu as the source of the avatars, this is only one of the names of the God of Vaishnavism, who is also known as Narayana, Vasudeva-Krishna, and just Krishna, and behind each of those names there is a divine figure with attributed supremacy in Vaishnavism.

== Meaning ==
The theological interpretation of svayam bhagavān differs with each tradition, and the literal translation of the term has been understood in several distinct ways. Translated from the Sanskrit language, the term means "Bhagavan Himself" or "directly Bhagavan". Gaudiya Vaishnava tradition often translates it within its perspective as primeval Lord or original Personality of Godhead; it also considers the terms such as Supreme Personality of Godhead and Supreme God as an equivalent to the term Svayam Bhagavan, and may also choose to apply these terms to Vishnu, Narayana and many of their associated avatars.

The term 'Bhagavān' consists of Bhaga and vān. The suffixes vān and mān are Sanskrit male-denoting words, meaning 'possessor of' which are used as a suffix to nouns like Bhaga (blessed attributes), Śrī (splendour), Kīrti (fame) etc. According to Viṣṇu Purāṇa, bhaga refers to the six attributes of the Lord – aiśvaryam (wealth), vīryam (valour), jñānam (wisdom), balam (prowess), śaktī (power) and tejas (splendour). Thus, Bhaga-vān means the possessor of the six divine qualities, ṣadguṇa.

Another interpretation of Bhagavān as per Viṣṇu Purāṇa is bha denotes aiśvaryam and vīryam, ga denotes jñānam and balam and va denotes śaktī and tejas, and an which is etymoligically na, means 'none', symbolising that he is devoid of inauspicious or evil qualities.

As the etymology of Bhagavān is perfectly illustrated in the Vishnu Purana, referring to the Vishnu Purana on who is Bhagavan too is perfect. Vishnu Purana clearly states that Bhagavan denotes none but Vāsudeva alias Narayana-Krishna.

Svayam means Himself, thus Svayam Bhagavān refers to one who is Bhagavān (Vāsudeva) Himself. As Śrī Kr̥ṣṇa, the most perfect descent (avatāra) of Narayana (Vāsudeva), He is no different from the latter, and hence, the Bhāgavata states kr̥ṣṇastu bhagavān svayam – Kr̥ṣṇa is the Supreme, Blessed Lord (Nārāyaṇa) Himself.

Early commentators of Bhagavata Purana such as Madhvacharya translated the term Svayam Bhagavan as "he who has bhagavata"; meaning "he who has the quality of possessing all good qualities". Others have translated it simply as "the Lord Himself". Followers of Vishnu-centered Vaishnava sampradayas rarely address this term, but believe that it refers to their belief that Krishna is among the highest and fullest of all Avatars and is considered to be the "paripurna avatara" (complete manifestation), complete in all respects and the same as the original.

== Perspectives ==
=== Supporting views ===
Some Krishna centered traditions accept views that subordinate Krishna to Vishnu. This view has been explained as a way to accommodating Krishna's human story within the composite Vaishnava theological perspective. However inclusion of Krishna in the list of avataras does not necessarily subordinate him to Vishnu as one of the Vishnu's expansions. Early authors, such as 12th century Jayadeva considered dasavatara to be principal incarnations of Krishna, rather than Vishnu.

Krishna-centered traditions such as Gaudiya Vaishnavas and followers of the Vallabha Sampradaya and Nimbarka Sampradaya, use the Gopala Tapani Upanishad, Vedanta Sutras and other Hindu scriptures such as the Bhagavata Purana verse 1.3.28, and the Brahma Vaivarta Purana, among others to support the view that Krishna is Svayam Bhagavan. This interpretation was summarized by the 16th century author Jiva Goswami in some of his works, such as Krishna-sandarbha.

In the sixth book of the Hindu epic Mahābhārata, the Bhishma Parva (where the Bhagavad Gita is part of), Krishna offers numerous quotations that reaffirm the belief that he himself is the Svayam Bhagavan. Verse 7.7 of the Bhagavad Gita, is often used to support the opinion that Krishna himself is the Svayam Bhagavan, and that no impersonal form of Brahman supersedes his existence, as it is a common view that Bhagavad Gita was propounding Krishna-theism before first major proponents of monism.

Other pervading understandings of the position of Svayam Bhagavan asserted in the Gita are connected to, non-Krishna-centered, traditions. One tradition follows predominately the views of Sankaracharya commentary on Brahma Sutras and is referred as maya-vad which justifies Svayam Bhagavan supremacy by a concept of power, wisdom or illusionary maya.

The second alternative understanding of the evident supremacy of Svayam Bhagavan in the Gita, is a popular view on Krishna being the highest and fullest Avatar of the Lord, Vishnu or Narayana. "The Bhagavad Gita depicts Krishna not only as Brahman but also as an 'Avatar of Vishnu' and the friend of Arjuna." In summary in accordance with this view Svayam Bhagavan Krishna is considered to be the purna-avatara (full incarnation) of Vishnu or, according to some, the universal Narayana who transcends even Brahman.

Supremacy or a concept of originality is often referred to in the words of Krishna himself, as for example, the theologian Abhinavagupta, in another tradition of Hinduism, introduces a quotation from the Bhagavad-gita of 'I', Krishna referencing Himself as the highest Self who transcends the perishable and imperishable.

=== Sri Vaishnava tradition ===
The Sri Vaishnavas identify Vishnu with the Brahman, while Krishna-centered traditions will associate Para Brahman with Krishna as Svayam Bhagavan. According to Ramanujacharya, Brahman is personal. Indeed, he is the supreme person, creator and Lord, who leads souls to salvation. Far from having no (positive) attributes, as some Advaita Vedanta followers maintain, Brahman is the sum of all "noble attributes"—i.e. omniscient, omnipotent, omnipresent, and all-merciful, all qualities attributed to Vishnu by all Vaishavas. According to South Indian traditions he is also advitya (Sanskrit meaning without rival). To such Vaishnavas, Shiva, Brahma, and the other gods of the Hindu pantheon are viewed as Brahman's agents or servants, created and commissioned by him. Some Vaishnavas consider them to be or see that they have the same status that of angels have in the western religious traditions.

"The entire complex of intelligent and non-intelligent beings – is viewed as real and constitutes the form, i. e., the body of the highest Brahman". A soul-body relationship, according to Ramanujacharya, is "entirely subordinate" to its soul, having no independent reality or value. However Ramanujacharya himself did not stress a subordination of the 'puravatara' Krishna to Vishnu.

=== Other views ===
However, Vaishnava traditions do not adhere to the concept of Svayam Bhagavan with the same views as those who support the concept. To support their view they quote the 149th chapter of Anushāsanaparva in the epic Mahabharata, Bhishma which states, with Krishna present, that mankind will be free from all sorrows by chanting the Vishnu sahasranama, which are the thousand names of the all-pervading supreme being Vishnu, who is the master of all the worlds, supreme over the devas and who is one with Brahman. This seems to indicate that Krishna is identical with Vishnu. Indeed, Krishna himself said, "Arjuna, one may be desirous of praising by reciting the thousand names. But, on my part, I feel praised by one shloka. There is no doubt about it."

Many Vaishnava schools have different interpretation of the concept as for example followers of the Swaminarayan Sampraday believe that Lord Narayana manifested himself as Swaminarayan. This view is only supported within their particular tradition.

=== Comparison ===
Some early schools of thought, such as Pancaratra in particular, refer to Vasudeva-Krishna (Krishna, the son of Vasudeva) as the source of all incarnations and as no different from the ultimate and absolute reality, and as non-distinct from Vasudeva and any other manifestations of the supreme self.

== Krishnaism ==
The term Krishnaism has been used to describe the devotees of Krishna, reserving the term "Vaishnavism" for devotees focusing on Vishnu in which Krishna is an Avatar, rather than a transcended being.

"Greater Krishnaism" corresponds to the second and dominant phase of Vaishnavism, revolving around the devotees of Vasudeva, Krishna, and Gopala. Today the faith has a significant following outside of India as well. Supremacy of Krishna is the key concept of Krishnaism. Gaudiya is one of the main traditions worshiping Radha Krishna that developed this concept.

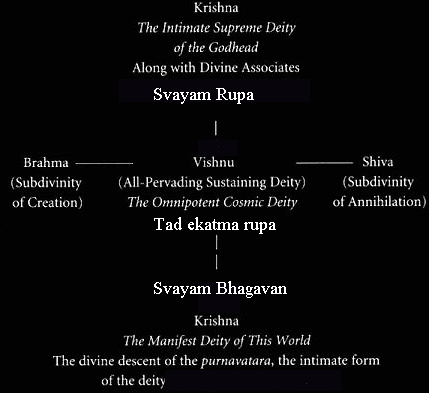
Relationship between different forms of Krishna as paripurna avatara of Vishnu and as svayam bhagavan being direct representation of svayam rupa

== Gaudiya Vaishnava perspective ==
=== Theory of Avatars ===
Primary theology of Caitanyaite or Gaudiya traditions is based and presented in Bhagavata Purana and Caitanya Caritamrita.Svayam in Svayam rupa does not imply one and only, and all conceptions by previous Vaishnava traditions, according to the Gaudiya Vaishnavas beliefs, fall under a second category, tad ekatma rupa (meaning: one that one and not different). 'Svayam' as a term means not depending on others or being himself. In his instruction to Sanatana Goswami, at Kasi, Chaitanya Mahaprabhu explains the implications of the vadanti verse: "The word brahman refers to Svayam Bhagavan, who has one consciousness without a second, and without whom there is nothing else." (Gupta 2007, p 36).

The deity of Tulasi Krishna at Udupi. Krishna is the main deity worshipped by the followers of Madhvacharya.

Rūpa Gosvāmī has described the svayaṁ-rūpa in his Laghu-bhāgavatāmṛta: "The form of the Supreme Personality of Godhead that does not depend on other forms is called svayaṁ-rūpa, the original form."

The tad-ekātma-rūpa forms are also described in the Laghu-bhāgavatāmṛta "The tad-ekātma-rūpa forms simultaneous to svayaṁ-rūpa form and are non-different. At the same time by their bodily features and specific activities they appear to be different."

Two best known Vedic descriptions of the creation are purusha sukta and nasadiya sukta. One hymn addresses to Vishvakarma, The one who makes all. To beliefs of Vaishnavas, the Visvakarma Sukta of Rig Veda (10.82) refers to Garbhodakasayi Viṣṇu indirectly as the Supreme God: The waters verily first retained the embryo in which all the gods were aggregated, single deposited on the navel of the unborn (ajah), in which all beings abide. and according to the Gaudiyas, falls under category of tad-ekātma-rūpa,

According to the Gaudiya Vaishnava interpretation, it is also confirmed in the Bhagavad-gītā (7.7), which says, mattaḥ parataraṁ nānyat: "There is no truth superior to Me." Where Krishna is 'bhagavan' himself, whose partial manifestations are the other gods. This idea is reflected in the Bhagavata Purana. The Brahma Vaivarta Purana tells us Krishna is the ultimate source from which Brahma, Vishnu, Shiva and Prakriti originate. He is Svayam Bhagavan while other incarnation are his partial manifestations. The comments of Sridhara Svami (an early Sankara sect commentator), bring out uniqueness of Krishna. According to him Krishna is perfect as all potencies are observed to be full in him. In Atharvavedasamhita, Krishna is described as having slain the giant Kesi, Keshava. The Kaustiki Brahmana (30.9) alludes to Krishna Angirasa, who is an object of evening ceremony in connection with Brahmanaacchamsin priest. The Aitareya Aranyaka speaks of two Krishnas of Harita Gotra. However the south Indian Vaishnavism makes very little stress on Krishna and altogether ignored Radha in contrast with the other traditions.

To the views of the Gaudiya Sampradaya, the Bhagavad-gita states that this bhakti-yoga is secretive: "Just hear from Me again about the most confidential part of the instructions in Bhagavad-gītā." It is also described as such in Bhagavata Purana Vaishnavas of ISKCON often stress their view that in both cases Krishna is speaking about himself, aham and me in Sanskrit mean, I am and Me respectively. While some commentators derive secondary meanings, all major Sanskrit dictionary accept that the direct meaning of aham and me, refers to Krishna himself.

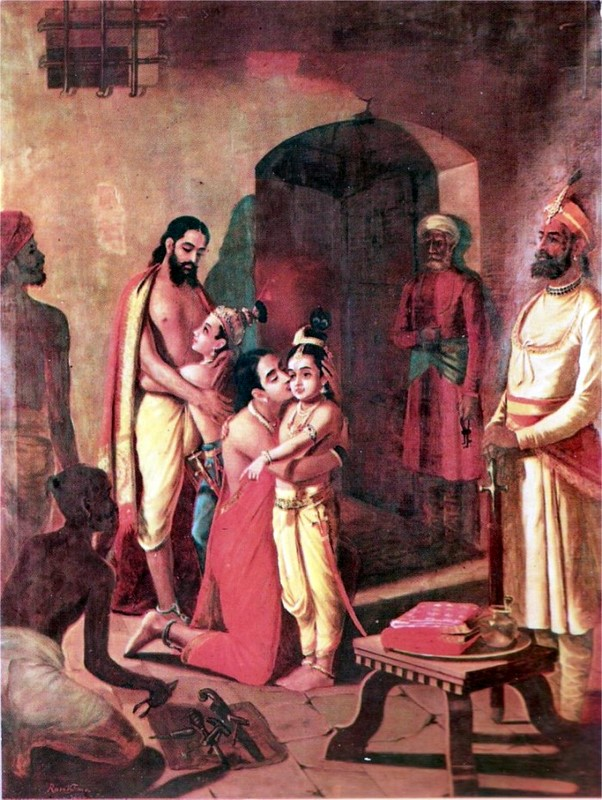
Krishna and Balarama meet their father and mother – Vasudeva and Devaki. Thus a personal name of Krishna as Vaasudeva or son of Vasudeva, and Devakinandana, son of Devaki. Painting by Raja Ravi Varma.

=== Lakshmi ===
When Gaudiya Vaishnavas present their views on Krishna being Svayam Bhagavan, they present a number of perspectives some include comparison with other forms such as Vishnu, that are considered supreme in other sampradayas. The Bhagavat Sandarbha and the Tattva Sandarbha are among the quoted works by Jiva Goswami,

Vaishnavas don't argue among themselves if Krishna or Vishnu is the Supreme. They consider it a matter of one's relationship with the Lord. Someone has a relationship with Vishnu, someone with Rama, someone with Krishna, etc. as per rasa theology.

In the Caitanya Caritamrita, Chaitanya discusses this in a joking mood with Venkatta Bhatta from Sri sampradaya, while Pustimarga tradition predates Gaudiya Vaisnavism in Radha worship. When Chaitanya traveled through South India in 1509-10, he stayed at the house of Venkata Bhatta, the father of Gopala Bhatta, priest of Srirangam. Venkata and his two brothers, Gopala's uncles Trimalla and Prabodhananda Sarasvati "were converted from their Sri Vaishnava faith in Lakshmi-Narayana as supreme to one in Radha Krishna" as Svayam Bhagavan. The dialog of this conversion is recorded in the 16th-century Caitanya Caritamrita biography by Krishna dasa Kaviraja.

In the Madhya lila of the Chaitanya charitamrita, a presentation is given with a reference to the particular verse of the tenth canto of the Bhagavata Purana as to why Lakshmi (also known as Sri, hence Sri Sampradaya) is burning with desire and still not capable of entering the realm of Vrindavana.

Prabodhananda Sarasvati, a Sri Sampradaya sannyasi, was converted as to supreme position of Radha-Krishna being Svayam Bhagavan instead of Lakshmi-Narayana. He apparently came to appreciate the supremacy of Radha worship from Caitanya.

=== Cosmological perspective ===
The view of South Indian Vaishnava groups on sarga, or subtle creation, is based upon scriptural adherence to Narayana or Vishnu being the cause of creation expanding into Viraja and then Maha-Viṣṇu glancing over pradhana, and that is the start of actual function of creation. This view is not contradicted by Krishna-centered Vashnavism and does not appear to be in contradiction with Svayam Bhagavan who as Vasudeva (son of Vasudeva, Krishna) is according to Pancaratra is at the source of creation.

Pancaratra sources are accepted by all of Vaishnava traditions, and confirmed by Yamunacarya who preceding in the line of Ramanuja, summarizing in his Agamapramanya, a defense of the revelation of the tantric Vaishnava Pancaratra, defending whole body of the texts being part of the Veda: "The Pancadratra Tantra is authoritative like the Vedic sentences ordaining sacrifice on the grounds that it is based on knowledge free from all defects". Amalananda, also defends Pancaratra and while confirming that Agamas do not have the same self-authenticating validity, as the four Vedas, but the authenticity of it assured because Veda bear witness to the omniscience of Vasudeva. This position also forms the basis of Bhagavata Purana based theology.

It is also a view of Gaudiya Vaishnavas that Sanatana Goswamis Brihad Bhagavatamrita, has illustrated this principle, not just in terms of comparative cosmology or avatara hierarchy as in Vaishnava Pancaratra, but also in terms of cosmology of adi-rasa. The cosmological principle of the four dhamas (with a separate place for the last two: Vaikuntha – abode of Vishnu or Narayana, tad-ekatma rupa, in transcendence, and Goloka as abode of Svayam Bhagavan in transcendence) is the key of the graphical presentation, but it is also an answer to the dilemma. In accordance with the cosmology of the Brihad Bhagavatamrita Krishna is believed being the original and most complete in all rasas or tastes is in fact not engaged and non engaging, is his independence, he does not even, at least in this his original form, carry symbols of Viṣṇu, he only carries his own flute, and that is the pleasure of his devotees.

=== Original Purusha of the Vedas ===
The form of Narayana is linked with the concept of sacrifice in the earliest known references to him. In Vedic sources such as the Purusha sukta, Narayana is given as the name of the self-offering of the great cosmic sacrifice of the Rig Veda. Narayana is not mentioned in Rig Veda itself, but came to be regarded as the seer who authored the hymn. It is possible that the sage who composed the Purusha Sukta hymn has been assimilated to the Purusha whose praise he had sung, and he himself became the object of worship. Mentions of a divine sage named Narayana, along with counterpart Nara, appears in many Puranic texts. Purusha is also identified with Vishnu in the Rig Veda and interpreted accordingly by many traditions of Vaishnavism. In the Bhagavata he is recognized as "the Lord whose being is sacrifice, Yajna Purusha" Some believe that thus this verse of the Rig Veda is a foundation of Vaishnava tradition. In the Gopala Tapani Upanishad the Rig Veda verse(1.22.20) was addressed paraphrasing the original of the Vedic hymn in accordance with the beliefs of the Gaudiya Vaishnava: It outlines a specific view held by the Gaudiya Vaishnava and Vallabha Sampradaya, that the conclusion of Vishnu worship is meditation on gopa-rupah or specific form of Krishna.

The Krishna Upanishad supports this conclusion of Gopala Tapani, and refers to the original "the most divine form of bliss dwells in the supremacy of love of Lord Krishna", saksad, Hari as gopa-rüpa. (1.10-12):

"The Supreme Personality of Godhead appeared in His original form as a cowherd boy. Cheated and bewildered by His illusory potency, the world could not understand His true identity.
"Even all the demigods cannot defeat the Lord's Maya potency. By the Lord's Yogamaya potency Brahma became a stick and Siva became a flute. How did the Lord's Maya potency manifest the entire universe?
"Knowledge is the strength of the demigods. The Lord's Maya potency steals away that knowledge in a single moment. Lord Sesanaga appeared in His original form as Lord Balarama. The eternal Supreme Personality of Godhead appeared in His original form as Lord Krishna."

Gaudiya Vaishnava believe that Krishna possesses qualities that are absent in other forms and they relate to his sweetness in Vrindavana lila. Krishna is himself Narayana. Narayana is often identified with supreme, however, when his beauty and sweetness (madhurya) overshadow his majesty, he is known as Krishna, i.e. Svayam Bhagavan. As Friedhelm Hardy says, the concept of Bhagavan, "a single, all-powerful, eternal, personal and loving God ... is an empty slot, to be filled by concrete characteristics" and these characteristics culminate in Krishna.

=== Paribhasa-sutra of Bhagavata Purana ===
Jiva Gosvami’s Bhajan Kutir at Radha-kunda. Jiva Goswamis Sandarbhas summarize Vedic sources of Gaudiya Vaishnava tradition's accretion of the concept bhagavān svayam based on paribhasa-sutra of Bhagavata Purana.

In Gaudiya Vaishnava, Vallabha Sampradaya Nimbarka sampradaya and old Bhagavata school, Krishna believed to be fully represented in his original form in the Bhagavata Purana, that at the end of the list of avataras concludes with the following text:

All of the above-mentioned incarnations are either plenary portions or portions of the plenary portions of the Lord, but Sri Krishna is the original Personality of Godhead (Svayam Bhagavan).

Not all commentators on the Bhagavata Purana stress this verse, however a majority of Krishna-centered and contemporary commentaries highlight this verse as a significant statement. Jiva Goswami has called it Paribhasa-sutra, the "thesis statement" upon which the entire book or even theology is based.

In another place of the Bhagavata Purana 10.83.5–43 those who are named as wives of Krishna all explain to Draupadi how the 'Lord himself' (Svayam Bhagavan, Bhagavata Purana 10.83.7) came to marry them. As they relate these episodes, several of the wives speak of themselves as Krishna's devotees.

Many Krishna-centered traditions believe that Svayam Bhagavan personally carries his unalloyed devotees (vahamy aham) like a husband carries his bride across the threshold into the house of prema bhakti. Badarayana Vyasa says in his Brahma Sutras, visesam ca darsayati, implying that the scripture declares a difference with regard to the passing from the world of nirapeksa or unflinching devotees.

=== Source of Para-Vasudeva ===
Baladeva Vidyabhusana, in his commentary on Gopala Tapani Upanishad states: Glory to the Gopala Tapani Upanishad, which to the pious reveals Lord Krishna, the original Personality of Godhead, the Supersoul near to all moving and unmoving creatures.

The word used is krsna svayam isvaram, the paraphrase of the Bhagavata Purana verse 1.3.28 that Jiva Goswami has called a key sutra, not only to the Bhagavata Purana but to Vedanta and thus all the Vedas.

According to the Upanishads it is believed that when Brahma, who is said to be the original created being, was approached by the sages, the Four Kumaras, he was presented with critical questions: – Who is the Supreme Lord? Who does death fear? – By knowing whom, does everything become realized? – Who is that person, who is behind the repetition of the creation of this Universe? His own original or sweet form, Sva-bimbaṁ is not manifested very often in the Universe, loka-locanam. Gaudiya Vaishnavas quote sources that claim that it happens only once in a kalpa (universal day of Brahma), which consists of fourteen manvantaras, each having seventy-one divya-yugas. To answer the four Kumaras, Brahma needed to relate this secret word of the seed mantra. And this is believed to be the answer to the question, who is supreme god and how he creates this world. Brahma replied to the sages: "Krisna is the Supreme Personality of Godhead. Death fears Govinda. By knowing Gopijanavallabha everything becomes realized. By pronouncing the word "svaha" the Personality of Godhead created the world. In the wider context of the Bhagavata's total perspective, Krishna is "not one among many but the Lord himself".

Sanat-Kumara Samhita confirms the belief that this Kama Gayatri is the foundational structure of the Goloka, believed to be the abode of Krishna, who is the original Vaasudeva: "In the whorl of the lotus flower which is Lord Krishna's transcendental abode, the Gopala mantra is written."

== Related historical records ==
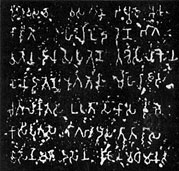
The first inscription of the Heliodorus pillar that was made by Heliodorus 110 BCE. This Garuda-standard of Vasudeva (i.e. Krishna) the God of Gods, was erected here by the devotee Heliodoros.

While some place Krishna-centered worship as Svayam Bhagavan in the medieval times of Indian history, there is some evidence suggesting the opposite. In antiquity Krishna images were worshiped at many places. Quoting Curtius, Dr. D.C. Sircar says that an image of Herakles (i.e. Vasudeva-Krishna according to Sircar) was being carried in front of the Paurava army, as it advanced against the Greeks led by Alexander the Great (The Cultural Heritage of India, vol. 4. p. 115) An interesting terracotta plaque showing Vasudeva carrying the infant Krishna over his head across the flooded Yamuna river, belonging to c. first century is housed in the Mathura Museum. A Mora stone inscription of about the same time refers to some images of Bhagavata Vrshni Panchaviras, Sankarshana, Vasudeva, Pradyumna, Samba and Aniruddha – which were very beautifully carved in stone. A Gupta period research makes a "clear mention of Vasudeva as the exclusive object of worship of a group of people," who are referred as bhagavatas.

Verifying the antiquity of the exclusive worship of Svayam Bhagavan, Krishna, the early Jaina texts repeatedly stress two categories of Baladevas and Vasudevas that clearly can not be attributed to the Buddhist tradition, and can not be traced to the earlier strata of the Jaina canon itself. The introduction of these novel categories in the Jaina tradition, therefore, can hardly be explained without references to the legends surrounding the two popular figures of the early Vaishnava tradition, namely Balarama and Krishna of Mathura.

Archaeological remains found in the region of Mathura support the fact that the popularity of these two divine figures had reached its zenith in the Mauryan and the Shunga period and associated Bhagavata religion had become widespread throughout Mathura and Western India areas. This period coincides with the large migrations of Jainas from Magadha to Mathura. Baladeva is referred to by Jaina Puranas as Halabhrit, without any support from Brahminical texts. All the Vasudevas are modeled after the description of Krishna found in the Puranas. They are called blue-black (nila) in complexion and are designated by several names that are normally applied exclusively to Krishna e.g. Keshava, Madhava, Govinda, Vishnu and Narayana (which is used as synonym for the name Vasudeva). List of opposites (or prati categories) include most of the names associated with Asuras in Puranas. According to an opinion of some scholars in Patanjali's time identification of Krishna with Vasudeva is an established fact as is surmised from a passage of the Mahabhasya – (jaghana kamsam kila vasudevah). This "supposed earliest phase is thought to have been established from the sixth to the fifth centuries BCE at the time of Panini, who in his Astadhyayi explained the word vasudevaka as a bhakta, devotee, of Vasudeva and its believed that Bhagavata religion with the worship of Vasudeva Krishna were at the root of the Vaishnavism in Indian history." Not just Indian Gupta period but also some historical records of the Greeks show existence of the bhakti tradition to Krishna-Vaasudeva, it needs to be noted that, even Panini gives some support to the ancient root of Krishna-Vaasudeva bhakti – (vāsudeva arjunābhyāṁ, or related to Arjuna), it is however only much later (2nd century BC) Patanjali who refer in his definition of the devotee or bhakta as "the follower of Vasudeva, God of gods."

== Other uses ==
In the Bhagavata Purana the term is used for other forms of God, including Dhanvantari, Vamana, Vishnu, and Vaikunthadeva. Although the term appears in the text referring to other forms, these references do not form a part of the Krishna-centered theology on which the reference to Krishna is based.

The Brahma Vaivarta Purana and Garga Samhita often refer to Krishna as paripūrṇatama, the term used in Gaudiya Vaishnava tradition by Bhaktivinoda Thakura in his Amnaya Sutra – krishnas tu paripurnatma sarvatra sukha-rupakah translated as 'original Supreme Personality of Godhead'.

== See also ==
- Acintya Bheda Abheda
- Bhagavata
- Gopala Tapani Upanishad
- Hare Krishna
- Krishna
- Krishnology
- Narayana
- Para Brahman
- Radha
- Vasudeva
- Vedanta
- Vishnu
