= Madan Mohan Temple, Karauli =

Hindu temple of Krishna in Karauli, Rajasthan

Shri Radha MadanMohan Ji Temple
- श्री राधा मदनमोहन जी मंदिर
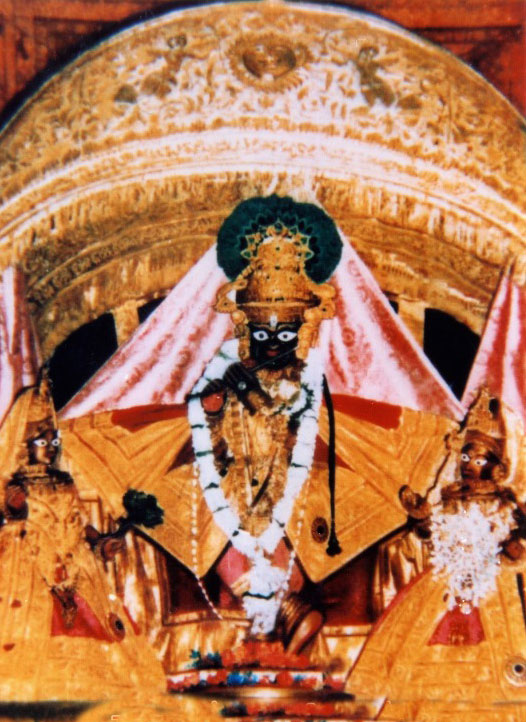
- Krishn with Radha (right) and Lalita (gopi) in central altar of the temple.

- Location in Rajasthan, India

Religion
- Affiliation: Hinduism
- District: Karauli
- Deity: Radha Madanmohan
- Festivals: Janmashtami, Radhashtami, Holi

Location
- Location: Karauli
- State: Rajasthan
- Country: India
- Interactive map of Shri Radha MadanMohan Ji Temple
- Coordinates: 26°49′6.3″N 77°03′37.7″E

Architecture
- Creator: Shri Gopal Singh Ji
- Completed: 1600 CE

Shri Radha Madan Mohan Ji Temple is a Hindu temple situated at Karauli, in the Indian state of Rajasthan. The temple is located on the banks of the Bhadravati River, a tributary of the Banas River in the hills of Aravali. It is located in the braj region. The temple is dedicated to Madan Mohan form of Krishna. In the central altar, Krishna is flanked with the icons of his consort Radha and Lalita on either side.

== History ==
The temple is dedicated to Krishna. It is believed that one night, King Gopal Singh was instructed by the Lord in his dream to bring his Madan Mohan idol from Vrindavan to Rajasthan before the attack of Mughal emperor Aurangzeb on Vrindavan temples. As instructed, the king of Karauli brought the original idol of Madan Mohan with him overnight and got this temple constructed Karauli.

It is also said that to protect idols of Krishna from Mughals, two idols were brought from Vrindavan and placed one at Karauli and another at Jaipur. It is said that to complete the Govardhan Yatra, it is mandatory to visit Madan Mohan temple and Govind Dev Ji Temple.

It is one of the Char Dham of Karauli District. Other three are Kaila Devi Temple, Mehandipur Balaji Temple and Shri Mahavirji.

Devotees used to put the Prasad. Jugal Prasad is a kind of Bhog in which devotees offer Laddu and Kachauri. It is put once in a day by one person only. The queue for the same is around two year long.

== Festivals ==
On the festivals like Krishna Janmashtami, Radhashtami, Gopashtami and Holi, temple witness large number of devotees visiting from across the Rajasthan for the "Darshan" of deities. Temple premises are decorated with huge amount of flowers on occasion of important festivals.

== See also ==
- Karauli
- Govind Dev Ji Temple
- Gopinath Ji Temple, Jaipur
- Radha Madan Mohan Temple, Vrindavan
- Kaila Devi Temple
