= Venkatta Bhatta =

Sri Vaishnavism priest

Venkatta Bhatta - Gaudiya Vaishnava (Nació en 1500-¿?) (formerly principal priest of Srirangam belonging to Sri Sampradaya) is famous for being part of the conversion from worship of Laksmi-Narayana to worship of Krishna as Svayam bhagavan. In Chaitanya Charitamrita 2.9.108-124 and further on Chaitanya talks about Krishna's supremacy in a joking mood with Venkatta Bhatta. Also notable for being the father of Gopala Bhatta.

When Chaitanya traveled through South India in 1509–10, he stayed at his house of at Srirangam. Venkata and his two brothers, Gopala's uncles Trimalla and Prabodhananda Sarasvati "were converted from their Sri Vaishnava faith in Lakshmi-Narayana as supreme to one in Radha Krishna" as original, Svayam bhagavan. The dialog of this conversion is recorded in 16 c. Caitanya Caritamrita biography by Krishna dasa Kaviraja.

In the Chaitanya Charitamrita lila, a presentation is given, with a reference to the particular verse of the tenth canto of Bhagavata Purana as to the reason why Lakshmi, also known as Sri (thus the name of Sri Sampradaya), is burning with desire and still not capable of entering into the realm of Vrindavana.

Prabodhananda Sarasvati who was a Sri Sampradaya sannyasi was also converted as to supreme position of Radha-Krishna being Svayam bhagavan instead of Lakshmi-Narayana. He as well apparently came to appreciate the supremacy of Radha worship from Caitanya.

== See also ==
- Gaudiya Vaishnavism
- Sri Sampradaya
