= Achintya Bheda Abheda =

Philosophical school of Vedanta

Achintya-Bheda-Abheda (Sanskrit: अचिन्त्यभेदाभेद, IAST: acintyabhedābheda) is a school of Vedanta representing the philosophy of 'inconceivable oneness and difference'. In Sanskrit, achintya means 'inconceivable', bheda translates as 'difference', and abheda translates as 'non-difference'.

The Gaudiya Vaishnava religious tradition employs the term in relation to the relationship between creation and the creator (Krishna, Svayam Bhagavan), between God and His energies. The movement's theological founder, Chaitanya Mahaprabhu (1486–1534), is considered the philosophy's main proponent, and differentiates the Gaudiya tradition from the other Vaishnava Sampradayas. It can be understood as an integration of the strict dualist (Dvaita) theology of Madhvacharya and the monistic theology (Advaita) of Adi Shankara.

== Historical perspective ==
Advaita schools assert the monistic view that the individual soul and God are one and the same, whereas Dvaita schools give the dualistic argument that the individual soul and God are eternally separate. The philosophy of Achintya-bheda-abheda includes elements of both viewpoints. The living soul is intrinsically linked with God, and yet at the same time it is not the same as God—the exact nature of this relationship being inconceivable (acintya) to the human mind. The soul is considered to be part and parcel of God, the same in quality but not in quantity. God has all opulence in fullness, while the soul has only a partial expression of this divine opulence. God in this context is compared to a fire and the souls to sparks coming off the flame.

Bhāskara's commentary on the Brahma Sutra is the earliest complete work of Bhedabheda to still exist.

The Bhedabheda philosophy became the foundation for the traditions of Nimbarka, Vallabha, and Caitanya.

== Philosophy ==
The theological view of achintya-bheda-abheda tattva asserts that God is simultaneously "one with and different from His creation". God's separate existence in His own personal form is not denied, even as creation (or what is termed in Vaishnava theology as the 'cosmic manifestation') is never separate from God. According to this tradition, God always exercises supreme control over his creation. Sometimes this control is directly exercised, but most of the time it is indirect, through his different potencies or energies (Prakrti).

A. C. Bhaktivedanta Swami Prabhupada summarizes the achintya-bheda-abheda philosophy in the following way: "One who knows God knows that the impersonal conception and personal conception are simultaneously present in everything and that there is no contradiction. Therefore Lord Caitanya established His sublime doctrine: acintya bheda-and-abheda-tattva—simultaneous oneness and difference."

The relationship between the sun and sunshine serves as an analogy for the relationship between God and the jiva. The sun and sunshine are not different qualitatively, but different quantitatively—there is a great difference between proximity to a beam of sunshine and proximity to the sun. Similarly, the jiva is qualitatively similar to God, but does not share God's qualities to an infinite extent, as God himself does.

Another conception of difference-in-nondifference is that jivas partake in the 'consciousness' (cit) and 'bliss' (ananda) aspect of God, but not the 'being' (sat) aspect. Thus, jivas are ontologically distinct from the absolute body of God.

The essence of Achintya Bheda Abheda is summarized as ten root principles called dasa mula.

1. The statements of amnaya (scripture) are the chief proof. By these statements the following nine topics are taught.
2. Krishna is the Supreme Absolute Truth.
3. Krishna is endowed with all energies.
4. Krishna is the source of all rasa—flavour, quality, or spiritual rapture or emotions.
5. The jivass (individual souls) are all separated parts of the Lord.
6. In the bound state (non-liberated), the jivas are under the influence of matter due to their tatastha (marginal) nature.
7. In the liberated state, the jivas are free from the influence of matter.
8. The jivas and the material world are both different from and identical to the Lord.
9. Pure devotion is the only way to attain liberation.
10. Pure love of Krishna is the ultimate goal.

== Difference from Advaita Vedanta ==
=== Acintya and Anirvacaniya ===
In Advaita Vedanta, the concept of anirvacaniya refers to the inexpressible nature of the world; it is neither real nor unreal. Thus, anirvacaniya is an ontological category. In comparison, acintya refers to the inconceivability of Bhagavan and his shaktis being different from each other, but at the same time being the same. This does not negate the reality of either.

== See also ==
- Dvaita
- Dvaitadvaita
- Gaudiya Vaishnavism
- Brahma Sampradaya
- International Society for Krishna Consciousness
- Panentheism
- Paramatma
- Shuddhadvaita
- Svayam Bhagavan
- Turiya
- Vishishtadvaita
- Chaitanya Mahaprabhu
- Jiva Goswami
- Baladeva Vidyabhushana
