= Tatastha =

Primary energy in a Hindu philosophy

In Gaudiya Vaishnavism, a sect of Hinduism, there are considered to be three primary energies of forces of existence: the internal (spiritual), external (material), and taṭasthā which can be translated as "marginal".

In this belief system, material energy can never be spiritual, spiritual energy cannot be tainted or changed in any way by matter or anything impure. Tatastha or marginal energy can associate with either spiritual or material energy.

Tatastha is called marginal because although it is an expression of God's energy and hence spiritual or divine, it can actually be overcome by illusion and delusion. This is what differentiates the individual souls from God. While individual souls share God's nature, it is infinitesimal in stature compared to God. In Gaudiya Vaishnavism this is one of the definitions of what differentiates the individual from The Supreme, God cannot be corrupted, but the individual can.

Marginal energy is considered to be the essential nature of individual living beings. Although they are eternal, they are positioned, as marginal energy, between lower material and higher spiritual energy. In other words, taṭasthā is between external (material) energy and internal energy of God, called Krishna or Svayam Bhagavan "Supreme God". In Caitanya Caritamrta, Madhya, Verse 6.160 are enumerated these three energies:

The spiritual potency of the Supreme Personality of Godhead also appears in three phases – internal, marginal and external.

Another verse (Caitanya Caritamrta, Madhya, 8.152) gives more information:

In other words, these are all potencies of God – internal, external and marginal. But the internal potency is the Lord's personal energy and stands over the other two.

So jivatma, living being is never equal to Supreme Godhead and also always subordinate to Him.
