= Baladeva Vidyabhushana =

Indian Gaudiya Vaishnava acharya (c. 1700–1793)

Srila Baladeva Vidyabhushana

Personal life
- Resting place: Radha-Shyamsundar Temple, Vrindavan, India
- Notable works: Vedānta-sūtra-Govinda-bhāṣya; Brahma-sūtra-Kārikā-bhāṣya; Gītā-bhūṣaṇa
- Honors: Vidyābhūṣaṇa; Vedāntācārya

Religious life
- Religion: Hinduism
- Denomination: Vaishnavism
- Philosophy: Achintya Bheda Abheda
- Lineage: Brahma-Madhva-Gaudiya
- Sect: Gaudiya Vaishnavism

Religious career
- Teacher: (Dīkṣā-Guru): Radha Damodara Goswami; (Śikṣā-Guru): Visvanatha Chakravarti
- Based in: Vrindavan, India
- Influenced: Bhaktivinoda Thakur; Gaurakisora Dasa Babaji; Bhaktisiddhanta Sarasvati; A.C. Bhaktivedanta Swami

Baladeva Vidyabhushana (Sanskrit: श्रील बलदेव विद्याभूषण, romanized: Baladeva Vidyābhūṣaṇa; c. 1700 – 1793 AD) was an Indian Gaudiya Vaishnava acharya (religious teacher) and a Vaishnav saint. He played a role in spreading the Gaudiya system beyond the borders of Bengal and Odisha and is known in Rajputana for spreading Vaishnavism there.

== Early life ==
Authentic biographical data on Vidyābhūṣaṇa's life is scarce, and much of what has been written about him is not based on verifiable sources. Early tradition and manuscripts indicate that he was born in Utkala, in the present-day Odisha. In the beginning of his Śabda-sudhā, Vidyābhūṣaṇa identifies himself as the son of Gangādhara Māṇikya. The same is supported by various other manuscripts, such as the colophon of the Govinda-bhāṣya manuscript accession number 450, preserved at the Vrindavan Research Institute. Some authors have tried to attribute other surnames and family relations without providing a single piece of evidence. Some believe that he was born near Remuna, Balasore where the famous temple of Khirachora Gopinatha is located.

Based on assumptions, the year 1768 was put forth by some as the year of his disappearance. However, while his birth date is unknown, a document preserved at the Jaipur Archives dated the fourteenth day of the Bhadra month of Saṁvat 1850 (nineteenth of September, 1793 AD) describes his ceremony of condolence presided by King Pratap Singh of Jaipur (ruled 1778-1803 AD). On the basis of this evidence, it is unrealistic to assume that he was born much before 1700 AD, as proposed by some. The earliest documents that mention Vidyabhusana belong to the 1740s.

== Life as a disciple ==
According to oral tradition, at an early age, he received a thorough education in grammar, poetry, rhetoric and logic, and went on a pilgrimage to various places in India. According to Vidyabhusana's statement at the end of his Siddhanta-ratna, he had been a follower of Madhva's philosophy before becoming a follower of the philosophy of Chaitanya Mahaprabhu.

Some authors maintain that he accepted sannyasa in the Madhva-Sampradaya. However, there are no records of Vidyabhusana ever using a sannyasa title or being referred to by a sannyasa name in any of the multiple period documents related to him or the temples managed by him. Many of Chaitanya Mahaprabhu's associates were sannyasis of various traditions and held names such as Puri, Bharati, and Sarasvati. There are no instances of any of his sannyasi followers giving up their sannyasa name, nor is this ethically acceptable in either the Gaudiya or Madhva traditions.

When he visited Jagannatha Puri (Odisha), he met Radha-Damodara Deva, a grand-disciple of Rasikananda Deva, with whom he discussed philosophy. Radha-Damodara Deva explained the conclusions of Gaudiya Vaishnava Theology as expounded by Caitanya Mahaprabhu. Moved by those teachings, Baladeva was initiated and began to study the Sat-sandarbhas of Jiva Gosvami. In the Siddhānta-ratna, Radha-Damodara is unambiguously acknowledged as his mantra-guru. The same is corroborated in the Chandah-kaustubha-bhasya, Tattva-dipika, Syamananda-sataka-bhasya, and Sahitya-kaumudi. This rules out the idea that Vidyabhusana accepted initiation from Visvanatha Cakravarti.

In a short time, he became experienced in Gaudiya Vaisnava philosophy. With his guru's permission and blessings, he moved to Vrindavana (Vrindavan) to study these teachings under Visvanatha Cakravarti Thakura. Baladeva fully accepted the Gaudiya Vaisnava philosophy and became a powerful exponent of this system.

== Major works ==
His most important work is his commentary on the Brahmasutra named Govinda-bhasya. He has also written commentaries on the Upanishads and the Gita, among several other works. His first known work was a commentary on the Vedanta-sutra or Brahma-sutra, entitled Brahma-sutra-karika-bhasya. It was composed by Vidyabhusana under the order (ājñayā) of Maharaja Sawai Jai Singh II (1688-1743 AD), as mentioned at the beginning and the end of the manuscript:

śrīmad-rājādhirājānām ājñayā racitaṁ mayā | vidyābhūṣaṇa-saṁjñena kārikā-bhāṣyam āśritam |

"By the order of the venerable King of kings, Sawai Jai Singh II, this versified commentary has been composed by me, Vidyābhūṣaṇa."

The work is undated, but from the available historical documentation, it can be inferred that it was written between 1730 and 1740 AD. This was the Vedanta commentary that Vidyabhusana wrote very quickly in order to appease the King and the opponents who belittled the Gaudiyas for not having a Brahma-sutra-bhasya. The much more famous Govinda-bhasya was a much later and more elaborate work, and its oldest known manuscript is dated Saṁvat 1815 (1758 AD).

Some believe that Baladeva received the title "Vidyabhusana" from the King or from the Ramanandis. However, the Karika-bhasya manuscript and his other earlier manuscripts are signed "Vidyabhusana." He may have received this title before going to Jaipur.

Another of his earlier works was the Tattva-dipika, also written at the request of Sawai Jai Singh II.

Some have claimed that the Govinda-bhāṣya was written at Galta, although no evidence supports this assertion. On the contrary, documentary evidence indicates that, even during the reign of Sawai Jai Singh II, Vidyābhūṣaṇa served as the mahant of the New Govinda-deva Temple in Vrindavan, as well as of his own temple in Jaipur. It is therefore implausible that he would have abandoned his responsibilities at both institutions to reside in a temple belonging to another sampradāya for the purpose of composing a commentary.

The earliest documents that mention Baladeva Vidyabhusana belong to the 1740s; therefore, it is quite unlikely that he had any participation in the Amer/Jaipur debates before the 1730s.

Other works include Siddhanta-ratnam (Govinda-bhasya-pithakam), Prameya-ratnavali, Siddhanta-darpana, Kavya-kaustubha, Vyakarana-kaumudi, Pada-kaustubha, Isadi-upanisad bhasya, Gitabhusana-bhasya, Sri Visnunama-sahasra-nama-bhasya, Sanksepa-bhagavatamrta- tippani, Tattva-sandarbha-tika, Stava-mala-vibhusana-bhasya, Nataka-candrika-tika, Candraloka-tika, Sahitya-kaumudi, Srimad-Bhagavata-tika (Vaisnavanandini).

A. C. Bhaktivedanta Swami Prabhupada, founder Acarya of ISKCON, dedicated his Bhagavad Gita As It Is to Baladeva Vidyabhusana, "who presented so nicely the Govinda Bhasya commentary on Vedanta philosophy."

== Commentary on Vedanta ==
An important incident attached to Sri Baladeva concerns his writing of the Vedanta commentary. The Vaishnava sect known as Ramanandi sect allegedly complained that because the Gaudiya Vaisnavas had no commentary on the Vedanta Sutra, they were not qualified to worship the Deity, and therefore the worship should be turned over to them. They also objected to the worship of Srimati Radharani along with Sri Krishna, which they claimed was not authorized anywhere in the shastras.

The Ramanandis informed King Sawai Jai Singh II at Jaipur, Rajasthan, who sent word to Vrindavana informing the devotees what had happened. At that time, Srila Visvanatha Cakravarti was very aged, so in his place, he sent his student, Sri Baladeva. Despite his strong arguments, the scholars in the assembly refused to accept anything other than a direct commentary on the sutras. Having no other recourse, Baladeva promised to present them with one.

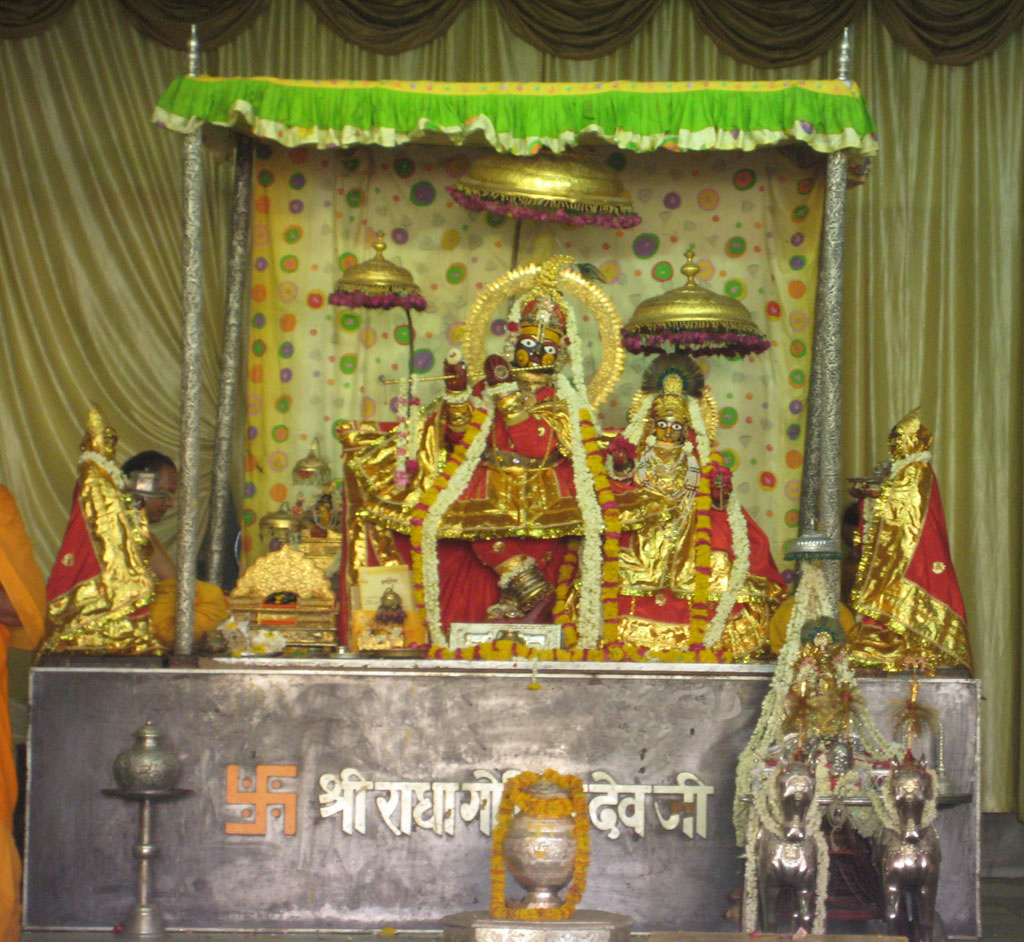
Sri Radha Govind-devji Temple, Jaipur

Sri Baladeva sought solace at Sri Govindaji's mandira (temple) in Jaipur. Feeling aggrieved, he informed Sri Govinda of everything that had happened. Lord Govinda appeared to Sri Baladeva that night in a dream and told him to write a commentary on the Vedanta-sutra. Invigorated, Sri Baladeva began to write and quickly completed the task.

Impressed with the commentary, the Ramanandis expressed their desire to accept initiation from Sri Baladeva Vidyabhushana. However, he declined their request, stating that among the four authorized sampradayas, the Sri sampradaya was highly respectable and the foremost adherent of Dasya-bhakti (devotion in servitorship).

== In Vrindavan ==
Returning from Jaipur to Vrindavana, Sri Baladeva presented the certificate of victory to Srila Visvanatha Cakravarti Thakura and narrated the events that had transpired. Cakravartipada bestowed his full blessings on Sri Baladeva. During that time, Sri Baladeva Vidyabhushana began to write a commentary on Srila Jiva Gosvami's Sat-sandarbha.

Sri Vijaya Govinda, residing at Gokulananda Mandira in Vrindavana, is said to have been worshiped by Baladeva Vidyabhushana. Sri Baladeva Vidyabhushana is also said to have installed the large Deities of Sri Sri Radha-Syamasundara.

After the departure of Sri Visvanatha Cakravarti Thakura, Sri Baladeva Vidyabhushana became the next acharya of the Gaudiya Vaisnava sampradaya.

He had two well-known disciples, namely Sri Uddhava dasa and Sri Nanda Misra.

Vidyabhushana's samadhi is located on the back side of Sri-Sri-Radha-Shyamsundar Temple, Sevakunj, Vrindavan.

== Complete works of Baladeva Vidyabhusana ==
- Vedānta-sūtra-Govinda-bhāṣya
- Brahma-sūtra-Kārikā-bhāṣya
- Bhagavad-gītā-bhāṣya - Gītā-bhūṣaṇa
- Īśopaniṣad-bhāṣya
- Commentary on Nine Upaniṣads
- Gopāla-tāpany-upaniṣad-bhāṣya
- Śrīmad-bhāgavata-bhāṣya - Vaiṣṇavānandinī
- Vedānta-syamantaka-ṭīkā
- Viṣṇu-sahasra-nāma-bhāṣya - Nāmārtha-sudhā
- Stava-mālā-bhāṣya
- Siddhānta-ratna
- Siddhānta-darpaṇa
- Vyākaraṇa-kaumudī
- Śabda-sudhā
- Laghu-bhāgavatāmṛta-ṭīkā
- Laghu-siddhānta-kaustubha
- Tattva-dīpikā
- Tattva-sandarbha-ṭīkā
- Commentary on five other Sandarbhas
- Aiśvarya-kādambinī
- Kāvya-kaustubha
- Candrāloka-ṭīkā
- Chandaḥ-kaustubha-bhāṣya
- Nāṭaka-candrikā-ṭīkā
- Pada-kaustubha; (unpublished manuscript)
- Prameya-ratnāvalī
- Śyāmānanda-śataka-ṭīkā
- Sāhitya-kaumudī

== See also ==
- Radha
- Krishna
- Brahma Sutras
- Govind Dev Ji Temple
- Govinda Bhashya
- Achintya Bheda Abheda
- Chaitanya Mahaprabhu
- Madhvacharya
- Jiva Goswami
- Vaishnavism
- Gaudiya Vaishnavism
