= Remuna =

- Town
- Location within Odisha
- Coordinates: 21.52611°N 86.87222°E
- Country: India
- State: Odisha
- District: Baleswar
- Elevation: 20 m (66 ft)
- Time zone: IST (+5.30)
- Pin Code: 756019
- Telephone Code: 067827
- ISO 3166 code: IN-OR

Remuna is a town and a notified area committee in Baleswar district in the Indian state of Odisha. It is famous for the Khirachora Gopinatha Temple.

== Geography ==
Remuna is located at 21.52611°N 86.87222°E. It has an average elevation of 20 metres (65 feet).

== Demographics ==
As of 2001 India census Remuna had a population of 28,958. Males constitute 52% of the population and females 48%. Remuna has an average literacy rate of 63%, higher than the national average of 59.5%: male literacy is 69%, and female literacy is 53%. In Remuna, 14% of the population is under 6 years of age.

== Tourism ==
=== Historical places ===
- Birthplace of Baladeva Vidyabhushana, eminent scholar who propounded Achintya Bhedabheda doctrine among Gaudiya Vaishnavas
- Kshirachora Gopinatha Temple: This is an ancient Gopinatha temple built in the 12th century by King Langula Narasinha Deba of Utkala. Built in a Utkaliya style of temple architecture this temple is surrounded by few Mathas and temples along with the principal deity Gopinatha. Kheera Bhoga and Abadha prasada are the famous Bhoga of this temple.
- Jagannath temple
- Goudia Radhakrishna Temple
- Gargeswara Mahadeba Temple
- Saptasara River
- Madhabendra Goudia Math
- Kanaka Durga Temple
- param vaisnavi matho, armala
- Abhiram paramhansa temple, armala

== Arts and crafts ==
Remuna is known for brass and bronze appliqué and utensils showing detailed work made by generational Craftsmanship by local artisans; they've been selling it in local markets and the region.

== Education ==
Schools- 1.* Remuna High School 2.Januganj Nodal UP school 3.Kendriya Vidyalaya02 4.Ganeswarpur UP school 5.Oxford public school 6.St Xavier School 7.Sri Aurobinda Purnanga Siksha Kendra 8.Saraswati sishu mandir 9.Vivekananda Siksha Kendra 10.S.u.n high school, mukhura. 11. Armala nodal high school, armala Colleges- 1.Remuna Junior/Degree College 2. Govt. Polytechnic University- 1. F.M. University (Vyasa Vihar) 2. Govt. Medical College

Other Institutions 1. Balasore Institute of hotel management 2. Basanti ITI

== Transport and communications ==
NH-5 Passes to the beginning of Remuna. Remuna is connected with City Bus, Auto, Local Buses, Trekkers from Balasore bus stand. Balasore bus stand is 5 km from Remuna. Balasore Railway station is 6 km from Remuna.
