= Khole Ke Hanuman Ji Temple =

Khole ke Hanuman Ji Temple
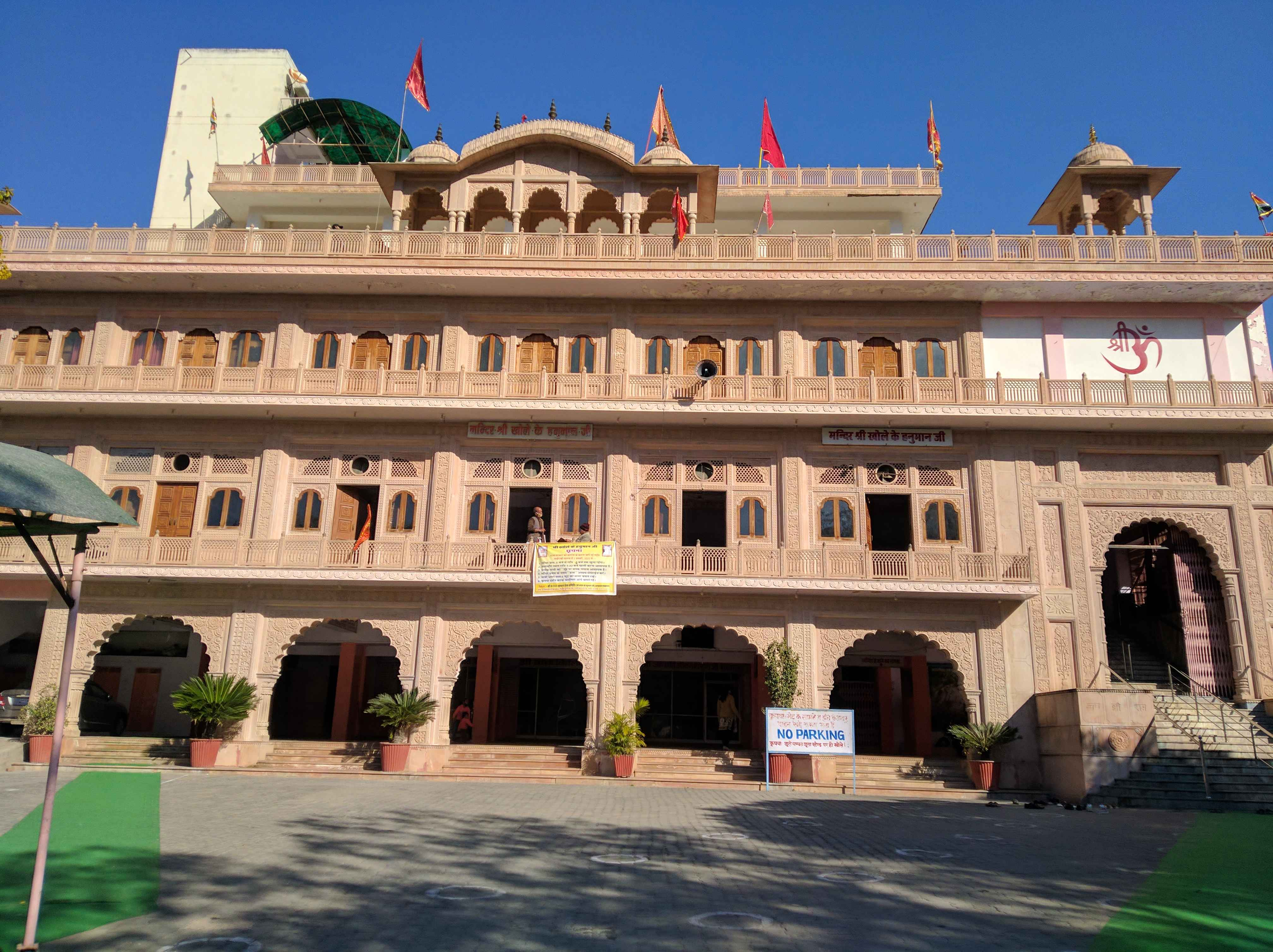

- Location in Rajasthan

Religion
- Affiliation: Hinduism
- District: Jaipur
- Deity: Hanuman
- Festival: Hanuman Jayanti

Location
- State: Rajasthan
- Country: India
- Interactive map of Khole ke Hanuman Ji Temple
- Coordinates: 26.9401°N 75.8548°E

Khole Ke Hanuman Ji Temple is a Hindu temple located at a distance of about 9 km from district headquarters of Jaipur, the capital of Rajasthan state in India. The temple is dedicated to a major Hindu deity Hanuman. Apart from the devotees, domestic and foreign tourists also come here to admire the picturesque beauty of nature at this place.

== Geography ==
This temple is situated at a hill named Lakshman Dungri of Aravalli mountain range. This place is situated in the beauty of nature and green environment is visible all around.

== History ==
In the 60s, Pandit Radhe Lal Choubey found a huge idol of Hanuman at this place and he started worshiping here. In 1961, He established Narwar Ashram Seva Samiti for the development of the temple. When this place was uninhabited, rain water used to flow here from the mountains. That is why the temple was named as Khole Ke Hanuman Ji.

== Architecture ==
This is a new building built in ancient fort style which has three floors in it. There is a big open square in front of the temple. Just to the right of the door, there is a marble mausoleum of Pandit Radhe Lal Choubey. In this grand three-storey temple, apart from Hanuman, there are separate and grand temples of Rama, Krishna, Ganesha, Gayatri and Valmiki. The paintings done on the walls and glass all around this temple are attractive.

== Rope way ==
In 2023, a rope way is also started here. Rajasthan state Governor Kalraj Mishra inaugurated it. This 436 meter long rope way from Annapurna Mata Temple to Vaishno Mata Temple situated on the hill has been built at a cost of Rs 18 crore. The height of this rope way, operated on five towers, is about 85 meters.

== Events ==
Every year a fair is organized here on the festivals of Govardhan Puja (Annkoot), where a large number of devotees come to have darshan and Prasada.

== See also ==
- Govind Dev JI Temple
- Moti Dungri Ganesh Temple
