= Govinda Bhashya =

Opening folio (Page 2) of the Govinda Bhashya manuscript (Acc. No. 5860) by Baladeva Vidyabhushana, preserved at the Vrindavan Research Institute.

Govinda Bhashya is a Gaudiya Vaishnava commentary (bhasya) on the Vedanta Sutra. It was written in the year 1628 Sakabda (1718 CE) at Galtaji (Galta) near the present city of Jaipur, Rajasthan, by Baladeva Vidyabhushana to defend Gaudiya Vaishnava theology.

== Govinda Bhashya: Gaudiya Vaishnava commentary on Vedanta ==
In 1718 CE, a branch of the Sri (Ramanuja) Sampradaya known as the Ramanandi sect, in the court of the king Sadacari Raja at Jaipur, Rajasthan, complained that since the Gaudiya Vaisnavas had no commentary on the Vedanta Sutra, they were not qualified to worship the Deity and therefore the worship should be turned over to the Sri Sampradaya. They also objected to the worship of Srimati Radharani along with Sri Krishna as not being authorised anywhere in the shastras.

The king was initiated within the Gaudiya sampradaya and he sent word to Vrindavana, informing the devotees what had happened. At that time Srila Visvanatha Chakravarti was very aged so in his place he sent his student, Sri Baladeva. In a great assembly he posed such forceful arguments to the followers of Ramanuja that they could not reply to them. He further explained: "The originator of the Gaudiya Vaisnava sampradaya, Sri Caitanya Mahaprabhu, has accepted Srimad Bhagavatam as the natural commentary on the Vedanta-sutra, as composed by Srila Vyasadeva Himself. This is proven in the Sat-sandarbhas."

The scholars in the assembly, however, refused to accept anything other than a direct commentary on the sutra. Having no other recourse, Baladeva promised to present them with one.

Feeling very aggrieved, Sri Baladeva came to Sri Govindaji's mandira (temple) and informed Sri Govinda of everything that had happened. That night the Lord appeared to him in a dream and instructed him to write a commentary on the Vedanta-sutra: "I will dictate to you what to write and therefore no one will be able to refuse to accept it."

Thus Baladeva began to write, and within a few days completed the commentary which was titled 'Sri Govinda Bhashya'. It convinced the Ramanandi scholars and they bestowed upon Sri Baladeva the title 'Vidyabhushana' ('ornament of knowledge (vidya)').

They expressed their desire to accept initiation from Sri Baladeva Vidyabhushana. However, he declined their request by stating that amongst the four authorized sampradayas, the Sri sampradaya was highly respectable and the foremost adherent of dasya-bhakti (devotion in servitorship). If there was any cause of loss of respect to the sampradaya this might be considered an offense.

An English translation of this text was presented by Rai Bahadur Srisa Chandra Vasu in 1916.

The traditional narrative is not uniformly attested. Stuart Elkman, comparing six versions of the episode, concluded that "the exact nature of the Jaipur dispute is not known, the various accounts of it all differing on important points", and cited A. K. Roy's observation (1978) that no memory of the debate survives in Jaipur, "not even in the family of the priests of the Govindadeva temple". Elkman himself argued that the composition of the Govinda-bhāṣya was probably not directly connected with the settlement of the dispute, which more likely turned on the guru-lineage (guru-paramparā) that Baladeva presented to the assembly.
