= Khirachora Gopinatha Temple =

Hindu temple in Odisha, India

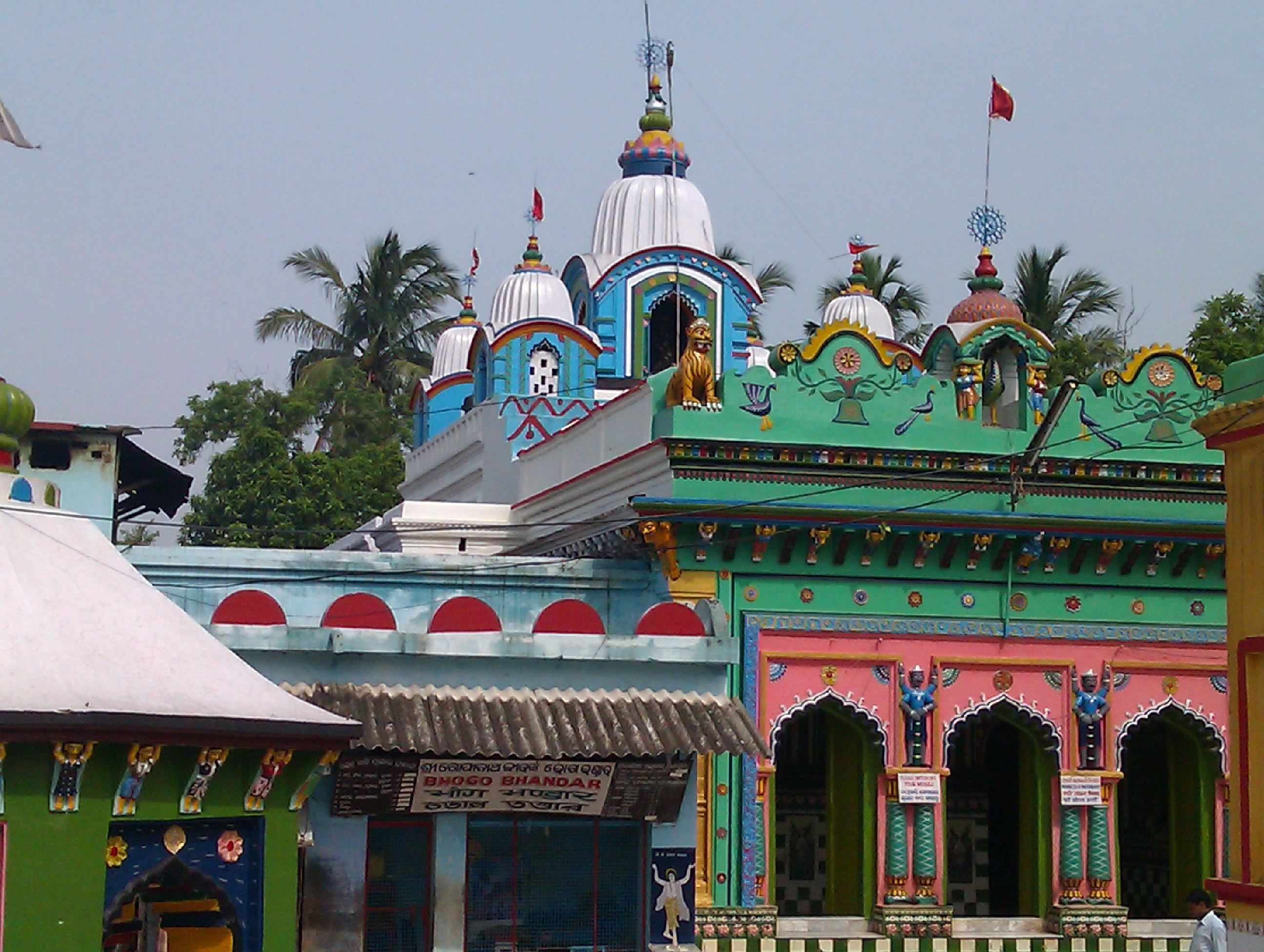
- Front view

Religion
- Affiliation: Hinduism
- District: Baleswar
- Deity: Gopinath
- Festival: Krishna Janmashtami

Location
- Location: Remuna
- State: Odisha
- Country: India
- Interactive map of Khirachora Gopinatha Temple
- Coordinates: 21°32′15.8″N 86°52′46.03″E

Architecture
- Completed: 1300 AD

Kshirachora Gopinatha Temple (Odia: କ୍ଷୀରଚୋରା ଗୋପୀନାଥ ମନ୍ଦିର) is a Hindu temple in Remuna, Odisha, India. The name "Remuna" is from the word "Ramaniya" which means very good-looking. "Kshirachora" in Odia means Stealer of condensed Milk and Gopinatha means the Divine Consort of Gopis. The reference is to child Krishna's love for milk and milk products. It is classified as one among the 108 Abhimana Kshethram of Vaishnavate tradition.

== Vigrahas ==
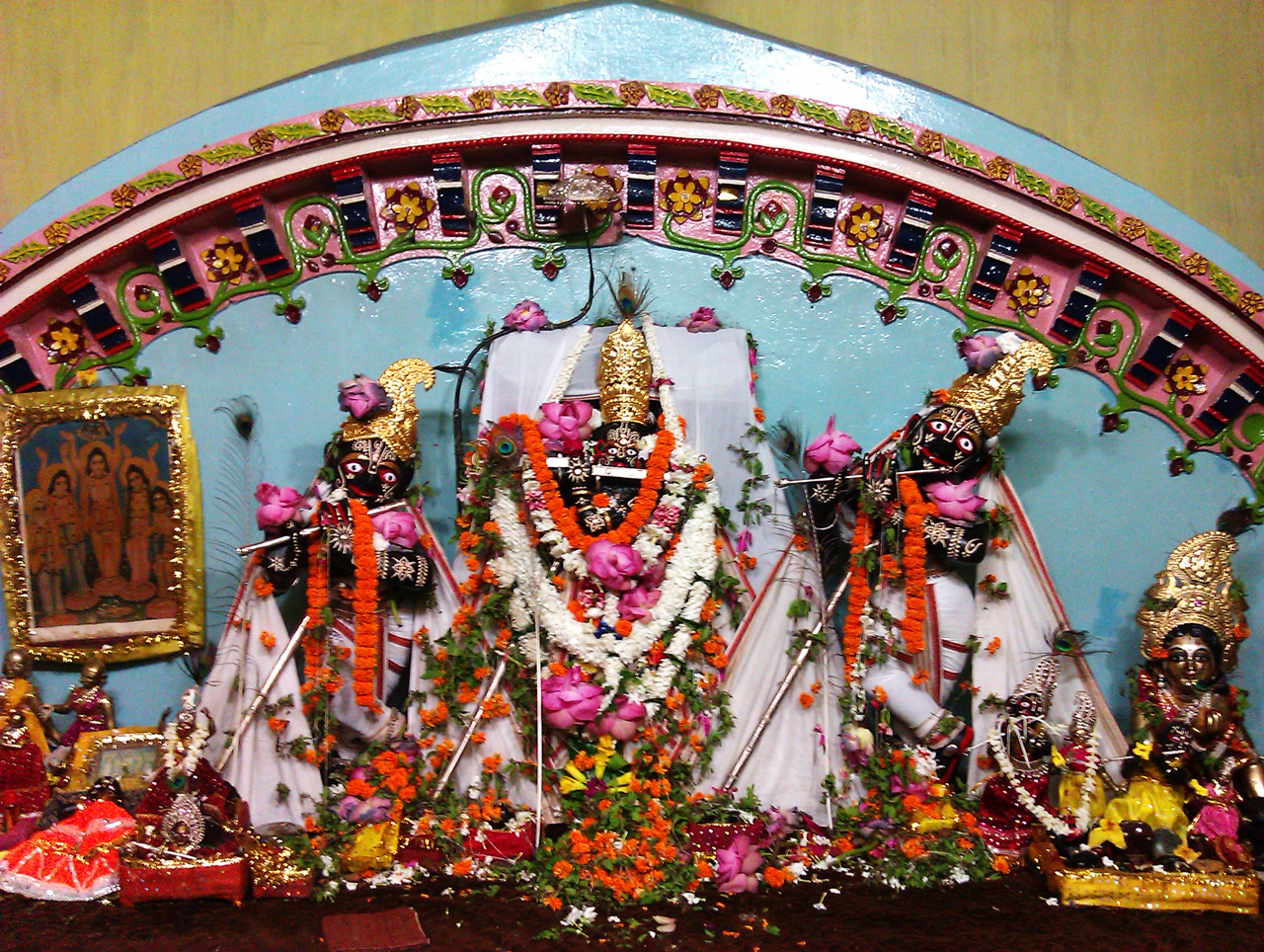
Lord Madanamohana Gopinath and Govinda

Lord Gopinatha, flanked by Sri Govinda and Sri Madana Mohana, is made of black stone. Sri Gopinatha stands in bas-relief. Govinda and Madana Mohana, who were brought from Vrindavana in about 1938 by a devotee named "Chaitanya Dasa Babaji", are standing freely. It is said that Sri Rama carved Gopinatha with his arrow and that Sita worshiped this deity in Chitrakuta. During vanavasa to show the next avatara vigraha to Sita. King Langula Narasingha Deva, the king of Utkala, brought this deity to Remuna in the 13th century from Chitrakuta. This king arranged to have dug the two big tanks, Brajapokhari and Kutapokhari.

== History ==
Over 500 years ago Madhavendra Puri was going to Puri to get some sandalwood for his Sri Gopal deity in Vrindavana. After a few days in Navadvipa, Sri Puri started for Odisha. Within a few days he arrived at Remuna where Gopinatha is situated. Seeing the beauty of the Deity, Madhavendra Puri was overwhelmed.

In the corridor of the temple, from which people generally viewed the Deity, Madhavendra Puri chanted and danced. Then he sat down there and asked a brahmana what kinds of foods they offered to the Deity. Madhavendra Puri thought: "I shall inquire from the priest what foods are offered to Gopinatha so that by making arrangements in our kitchen, we can also offer similar foods to Sri Gopala."

When the Brahman priest was questioned in this matter, he explained in detail the types of food that were offered to the Deity of Gopinatha. The brahmana priest said: "In the evening the Deity is offered sweetened condensed milk in twelve earthen pots. Because the taste is as good as nectar, it is named amrta keli. This condensed milk is celebrated throughout the world as gopinatha-ksheer. It is not offered anywhere else in the world."

While Madhavendra Puri was talking with the brahmana priest, the condensed milk was placed before the Deity as an offering. Seeing this Madhavendra Puri thought "If, without my asking, a little condensed milk is given to me, I could then taste it and make a similar preparation to offer my Lord Gopala." Then immediately Madhavendra Puri realised his mistake in desiring to taste the condensed milk, and he immediately repented, "I have committed an offence. I have desired to taste the preparation before it was offered to the Lord." Thinking in this way Puri Goswami left and went to a nearby vacant marketplace. Sitting there he began to chant.

After finishing the worship to Gopinatha the Pujari (priest) rested. In a dream Gopinath told him to get up and take the pot of ksira that he had hidden under his garments and to give it to Madhavendra Puri. The Pujari got up, found the sweet, and brought it to Madhavendra Puri. The Pujari told him For you Sri Gopinatha has stolen kshira. There is no other fortunate man like you. This is how the deity got the name "Kshira Chora Gopinatha". 'Kshira' means condensed milk, and 'Chora' means thief.

== See also ==
- Chaitanya Mahaprabhu
- Krishna
- Gopinath
- Madhavendra Puri
- Navagraha
