= Prabodhananda Sarasvati =

Rasika saint from Vrndāvana, disciple of Sri Hita Harivamsa Mahaprabhu

Prabodhananda Sarasvati was a Gaudiya Vaishnava and Radhavallabha sannyasi.

A Dravida Brahmin from Srirangam, Prabodhananda formerly followed Sri Vaishnavism but was converted to the path of devotion to Radha Krishna by Chaitanya Mahaprabhu. When Chaitanya traveled through south India in 1509–10, he stayed at the house of Venkata Bhatta, the father of Gopal Bhatta, priest of Srirangam. Venkata and his two brothers, Gopala's uncles Trimalla and Prabodhananda Sarasvati, "were converted from their Sri Vaishnava faith in Lakshmi Narayana supreme to one in Radha Krishna" as Svayam Bhagavan. The dialog of this conversion is recorded in Chaitanya Charitamrita, the 16th-century biography of Chaitanya by Krishna dasa Kaviraja.

Sometime after his conversion, Prabodhananda composed a text in praise of the sacred land of Krishna's birth, Vrindavan, Sri Vrndavana Mahimamrta and "Radha Rasa Sudha Nidhi"(also traditionally attributed to Sri Harivansh by his lineage). Sangita-Madhava and Caitanya Candrāmṛta were also composd by him along with a host of other works. He also composed commentaries on Shruti-stuti and a bhāshya on Gopāla-tāpani Upanishad as well as works like Kāma-bīja and Kāma-gāyatrī vyākhyā. Harivanshastakam may have been written by him to praise his junior contemporary.

== See also ==
- Gopal Bhatta Goswami
- Vrindavan
