= Gopala Bhatta Goswami =

Indian saint

Gopala Bhatta Goswami (1503–1578) is one of the foremost disciples of the Vaishnava saint, Sri Chaitanya Mahaprabhu, and a historical figure in the Gaudiya Vaishnava school of Hinduism. He was part of a group of Vaishnava devotees known collectively as the Six Goswamis of Vrindavan, who were influential in establishing the philosophical basis of the Gaudiya tradition in formalised writings.

== Background ==
Born in a Sri Vaishnava family from the Tamil Iyengar community of Sriangam, and the son of Venkatta Bhatta, Gopala Bhatta Goswami was a devotee of Lakshmi Narayana. According to biographies such as the Bhakti Ratnakara, Gopala Bhatta's first meeting with Chaitanya Mahaprabhu was in 1510, during Mahaprabhu's tour of South India. Although he was a youth, he was given the opportunity to meet with Chaitanya and serve him for serveral months. Such was his love for the saint that when Chaitanya Mahaprabhu was about to leave, Gopala Bhatta became upset, and for Gopala Bhatta's sake, Chaitanya then agreed to stay a few more days.

According to Gaudiya tradition, it was during this time that Gopala Bhatta had a spiritual vision in which Chaitanya Mahaprabhu revealed himself as an avatar of Krishna. In the vision, Krishna then told him that in the town of Vrindavan, he would meet with two devotees, namely Rupa Goswami and Sanatana Goswami, who would instruct him in the finer details of devotional service (bhakti).

When Gopala Bhatta awoke from the experience, he wanted to leave for Vrindavan at once. However Chaitanya Mahaprabhu told him to stay and serve his parents. After Chaitanya's departure, Gopal Bhatta took guidance from his uncle Prabhodananda Sarasvati. Gopal Bhatta took care of his parents into their old age, and after they died, he then travelled to Vrindavana. There he met Rupa and Sanatana who accepted him as a brother. Gopal Bhatta later helped Sanatana compile the book Hari Bhakti Vilasa.

== Vrindavan ==
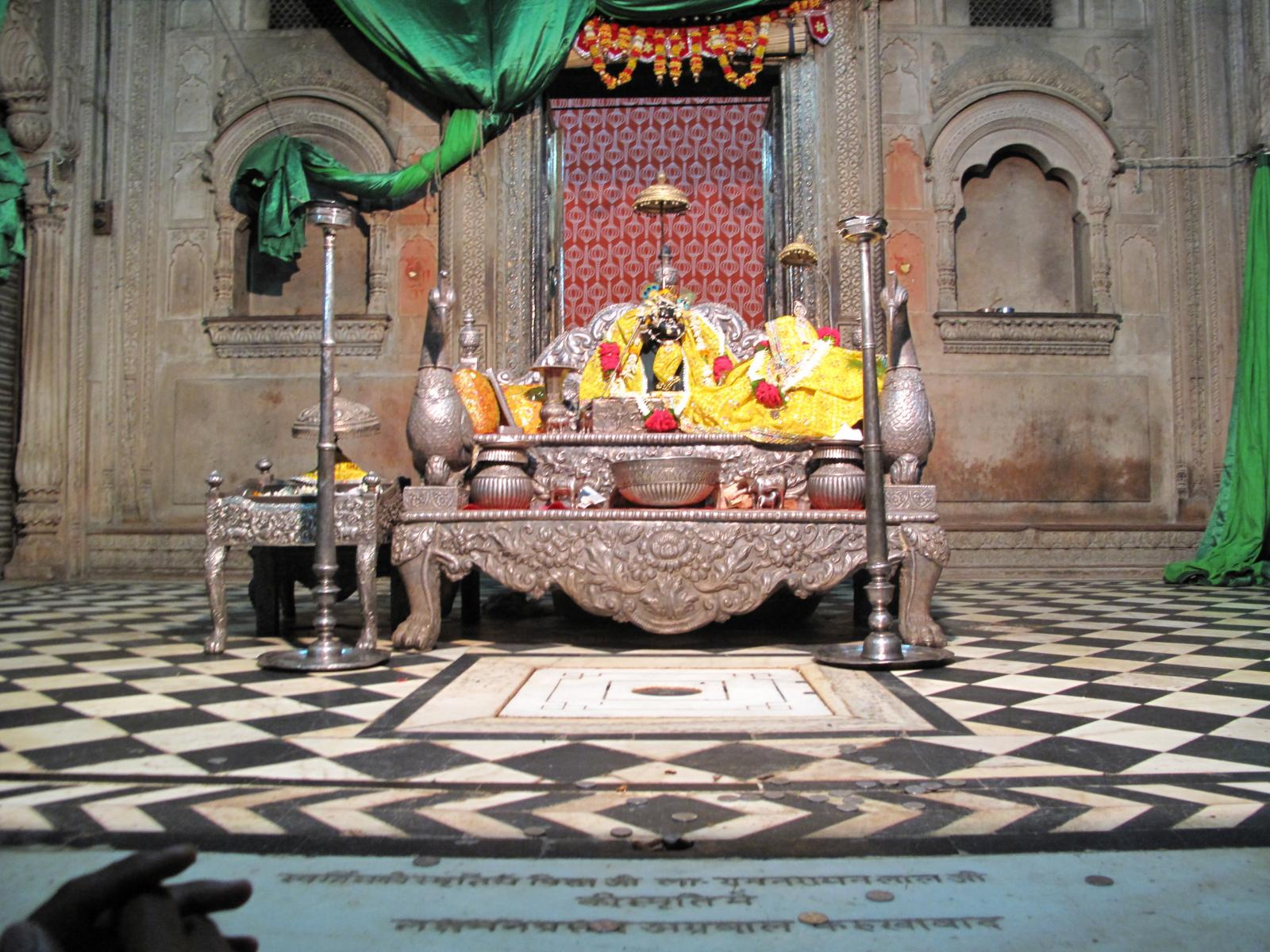
Radha Raman Temple, Vrindavan established by Gopala Bhatta Goswami in 1542.

Gopala Bhatta studied rhetoric, poetry, Vedanta, and Sanskrit grammar from his uncle Prabodhananda Sarasvati. After the passing of his parents he went to Vrindavan, where he met both Rupa and Sanatana Goswamis as had been instructed in his vision.

When Lord Chaitanya discovered that Gopala Bhatta was in Vrindavan, he was pleased and sent some of his personal belongings to Gopala Bhatta, who worshiped them. Mahaprabhu also sent a letter instructing Gopala Bhatta to help Rupa and Sanatana compile Vaishnava literature. Gopala Bhatta accepted this instruction as his life and soul, and he later also engaged his disciple Srinivasa Acarya in carrying the writings to Bengal. Gopala Bhatta established the Radha Raman Temple in Vrindavan in 1542, his samadhi also exists within the temple complex.

He serves Shrimati Radharani as one of Her asta manjaris, Guna-manjari. His samadhi is within Radha Ramanaji's Temple compound behind the appearance place of the Deity. Gopala Bhatta Goswami initiated Gopinatha (Pujari Goswami), a lifelong brahmachari who served Radha Ramanaji for his whole life.

== See also ==
- Bhakti Yoga
- Hare Krishna (mantra)
- Nityananda
- Gaudiya Math
- International Society for Krishna Consciousness
- Krishnology

== Bibliography ==
- Bhakti Ratnakara (PDF).
- Shri Narahari Chakravarti (1913). Shri Rasabihari Sankhya Tirtha (ed.). Bhakti Ratnakar (in Bengali). Shri Ramdev Mishra.
