= Gopashtami =

Hindu festival dedicated to worship of Gau Mata (Mother cow)

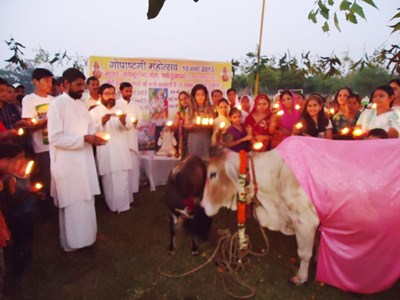
- Gopashtami celebration
- Observed by: Hindus Major celebrations by: Gaudiya Vaishnavism, Radha Vallabha Sampradaya
- Type: Religious, Cultural
- Frequency: Annual
- Related to: Vaishnavism

Gopashtami (IAST: Gopāṣṭamī) is a Hindu festival occurring on Ashtami (eighth day, the name itself comes from two words — Go meaning cow and Ashtami meaning eighth day, so it is simply called the day of the cow) of Shukla Paksha (waxing phase of moon) of Kartik month, in which cows and bulls are rendered worship. According to Hindu belief, all 33 crore gods and goddesses reside inside the body of a cow, which is why the cow is considered one of the most sacred animals in Hinduism and worshipping her is seen as equal to worshipping all deities at once. It is the coming-of-age celebration when Krishna's father, Nanda, gave Krishna the responsibility for taking care of the cows of Vrindavan. Before this day, Krishna was only looking after small calves. This was the first time his father trusted him with the full herd, and his brother Balarama also came along with him. This festival is mostly celebrated in Braj area which is around Mathura and Vrindavan in Uttar Pradesh, because this is the place where Krishna actually lived and grazed the cows. It is also celebrated in many parts of north and west India, specially by people who are from farming and cattle keeping communities. Old Hindu religious texts have also mentioned this day as a special day for feeding and worshipping cows. Many goshalas — which are shelters made for old and aged cows — also celebrate this festival as one of their most important days in the year.

== Celebrations ==
Go-puja is done on this day. Devotees visit the gosala, bathe and clean the cows and the gosala. Cows are decorated with cloth and jewellery before offering special ritual by the devotees. Special fodder is fed for good health and special drives are organized for their preservation. On this day, Krishna puja and cow puja are performed along with pradakshina to acquire blessing for a good and happier life. Devotees also pay special respect to cows for her usefulness in daily life. Cows provide milk that helps in fulfilling the nutritional requirement of the people like a mother. This is why cows are held sacred and worshipped in Hindu religion as a mother. The glories of the cow and her protection are discussed by senior devotees. All of them feed the cows and take part in a feast near the gosala.

== See also ==
- Krishna
- Balarama
- Diwali
