= List of villages in Mant tehsil =

This is a list of villages in Mant Tehsil in Mathura district of Uttar Pradesh, India.

Sr. No.	Village Name	Population	Notes
1	Abhaipura Banger	169	Small village
2	Ahamadpur	1,627	
3	Akbarpur, Mathura	4,419	
4	Amanullapur	1,607	
5	Amera	2,088	
6	Arazi Milik Bikanushah		
7	Arruwa Banger	12,982	Large village
8	Arruwa Khadar	71	
9	Asfabad	386	
10	Auhawa Bangar	3,398	
11	Awa Khera	1,751	
12	Badanpur		
13	Badhari		
14	Badoth		
15	Baghai Banger		
16	Bahadin	1,499	
17	Baikunthpur		
18	Bakla		
19	Balipur	2,088	
20	Barhaun	2,088	
21	Baroth Bangar		
22	Baroth Khadar		
23	Basau Banger		
24	Begampur Banger		
25	Begampur Khader		
26	Bera, Mathura	2,923	
27	Bhadanwara		
28	Bhadavan Banger		
29	Bhagat Bhakrelia Banger		
30	Bhairai Banger		
31	Bhairai Khadar		
32	Bhalai		
33	Bhankerpur Basela	2,632	
34	Bhartiyaka		
35	Bheem Bangar		
36	Bheema	2,088	
37	Bhidauni	3,256	Large village
38	Bhooda Sani		
39	Bhudri		
40	Bhureka		
41	Biballi		
42	Bijoli	4,261	
43	Bil Aliabad		
44	Bilandpur		
45	Bindu Bulaki		
46	Birbal		
47	Birhana	2,088	
48	Birju Garhi		
49	Bisavli		
50	Bulakpur		
51	Chandpur Kalan	1,790	
52	Chandpur Khurd		
53	Chhari		Site of the Radha Krishna Vivah Sthali, Bhandirvan temple
53	Chauhari		
54	Chaukra		
55	Chhinparai Banger		
56	Chindauli		
57	Chinta Garhi		
58	Choorahansi		
59	Dadisara		
60	Daharuwa		
61	Dangoli Bangar		
62	Dangoli Khader		
63	Daulatpur Banger		
64	Daulatpur Khader		
65	Dilu Patti	2,616	
66	Diwana	5,169	
67	Dilu Patti	1,656	
68	Dunetiya	866	
69	Ekhu	1,798	
70	Faridampur		
71	Firozpur		
72	Gaiyara		
73	Gaju		
74	Garhi Kolaher		
76	Girtana		
77	Gonga		
78	Hamazapur		
79	Hernol		
80	Girtana		
81	Inayatgarh Banger		
82	Inayatpur		
83	Iroli Gujar Bangar		
84	Irolizunnardar		
85	Jafarpur Banger		
86	Jahangirpur Banger		
87	Jaiswan		
88	Jarara		
89	Jatpura		
90	Javara		
91	Kakrari		
92	Kalyanpur		
93	Kaneka		
94	Kankar Garhi		
95	Karahari		
96	Khadiya		
97	Khaira		
98	Khajpur		
99	Khanpur		
100	Kharwal		
101	Kharwal		
102	Kheria		
103	Kinarai Bangar		
104	Kolahar		
105	Kolana Banger		
106	Koyal		
107	Kurawli		
108	Kudawara		
109	Lal Garhi		
109	Girtana		
110	Lalpur Mahavan		
111	Lalpur Mat		
112	Lamtauri		
113	Lohai		
114	Maduakar Banger		
115	Makhdumpur Banger		
116	Managarhi		
117	Mangal Khoh Banger		
118	Mani Garhi Bangar		
119	Manina Balu		
120	Maoli		
121	Marhalamukha Banger		
122	Mat Mula Bangar		
123	Mat Raja Bangar		
124	Meerpur Bangar		
125	Milik Kalan		
126	Mishri		
127	Mithauli	3,000	
128	Moiuddinpur		
129	Mubarikpur		
130	Musmana Banger		
131	Nabipur		
132	Nagal		
133	Nagla Bari		
134	Nagla Birbala		
135	Nagla Dani		
136	Nagla Deh		
137	Nagla Himaun		
138	Nagla Jangali		
139	Nagla Mahru		
140	Nanakpur Banger		
141	Narbehansi		
142	Naseeti		
143	Nauhjheel Banger		
144	Nausherpur		
145	Nawali		
146	Neem Gaon		
147	Noorpur Banger		
148	Pabbipur		
149	Pach Hara		
150	Pal Kherha		
151	Panigaon Bangerl		
152	Panigaon Khader		
153	Parsauli		
154	Patipura		
155	Piproli Bangar		
156	Piri		
157	Pirsuwa		
158	Pithora Bangar		
159	Pokher Hirde		
160	Poluwa Kalan		
161	Raipur Banger		
162	Ram Nagla		
163	Ramgarhi Banger		
164	Sadarpur		
165	Saddikpur		
166	Saeo Patti Banger		
167	Said Garhi		
168	Sakatpur		
169	Salaka		
170	Samauli Bangaar		
171	Sampat Jogi		
172	Saur		
173	Shall		
174	Shankar Garhi		
175	Sherni, Mathura		
176	Shivli		
177	Sigoni Banger		
178	Shihavan	309	
179	Sikanderpur		
180	Sirrela		
181	Suhagpur		
182	Sultan Patti		
183	Sultanpur Bangar		
184	Suraj	2,285	
185 - 186	Surir	47,185	Surir Kalan (residential); and Surir Vijau (commercial, market)
187	Surja	618	
188	Surraka		
189	Tehra Mahaban	1,446	
190	Tehramat	618	
191	Thainua		
192	Thana Amarsingh	903	
193	Thok Bindavani	2,040	
194	Thok Kamal	1,244	
195	Thok Saru	791	
196	Thok Sumera	1,376	
197	Thokgyan	1,561	
198	Tilak Garhi	2,714	
199	Tirwaya	1,433	
200	Toli Banger	844	
201	Udhar	1,648	

== Transportation ==
Mat is connected to Bajna - Mathura Road and Yamuna Expressway.

== See also ==
- Mant (Assembly constituency)
- Mathura district
