= Rawal, Uttar Pradesh =

Rawal
- Village
- Location of Rawal on the map of Uttar Pradesh Rawal (India)
- Coordinates: 27°45′25″N 77°41′40″E
- Country: Mahavan
- State: Uttar Pradesh
- District: Mathura
- Lok Sabha: Baldev (Assembly constituency)
- Vidhan Sabha: Mathura

Government
  - Type: Local government in India
  - Body: Gram Panchayat
  - Pradhan (Sarpanch): Kamlesh

Population (2011)
  - Total: 2,753

Languages
  - Official: Hindi
  - Local: Braj Bhasha
- Time zone: UTC+5:30 (IST)
- PIN: 281305
- Vehicle registration: UP85 XXXX
- Nearest city: Vrindavan, Raya, Mathura

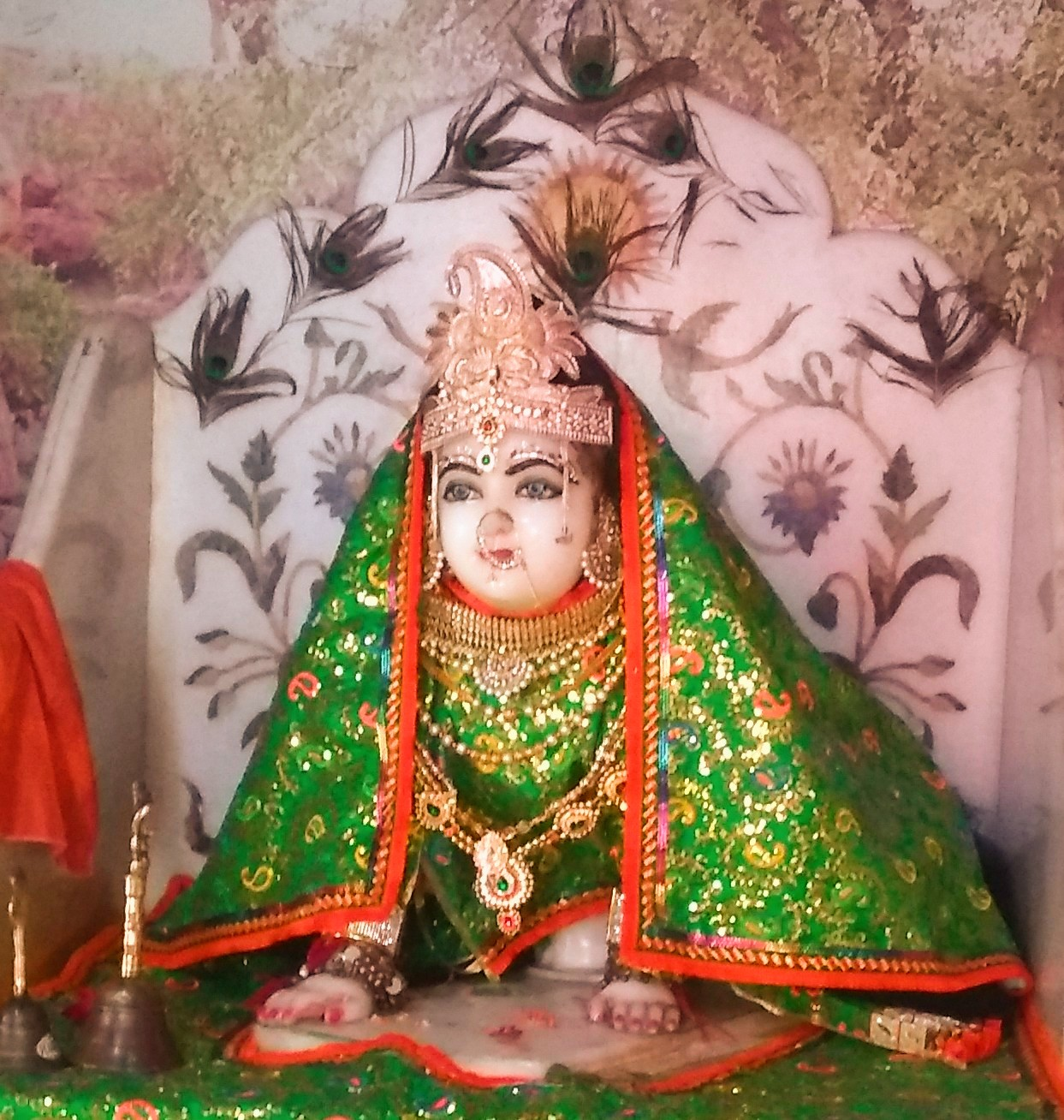
A statue of Radha as a child in "Shri Radha Rani Janam Sthal Temple" at Raval.

Raval, a small village on north bank of Yamuna, 5 km north of Gokul in Mahavan Tehsil of Mathura district in Braj region of Uttar Pradesh, is birthplace of Hindu mother goddess Radha, the consort of Lord krishna. Shri Radha Rani Janam Sthal Temple (lit. Radha's Birthplace Temple) marks the place where she was believed to have been born. Though she was born in Raval, sometimes it is mistakenly believed that was born in Barsana, a place where she grew up. According to popular legend, Radha was discovered by Vrishbhanu on an effulgent lotus floating in Yamuna river. Radha was nine months older than Krishna.

== Etymology ==
The name "Raval" is believed to be derived from "Ravalavana," one of the sub-forests (Upavanas) of Vrindavan mentioned in ancient texts. Another interpretation suggests that "Raval" means "an influential landlord," referring to King Vrishabhanu, Radha's father, who was a prominent figure in the region.

== Geography ==
Raval village is located in the Mahavan Tehsil of the Mathura district, Uttar Pradesh. It is situated approximately 13 kilometers (8.1 mi) from Mathura city and about 7 kilometers (4.3 mi) from Gokul. The village lies on the eastern bank of the Yamuna River, a sacred river in Hinduism, at a distance of 1 kilometre (0.62 mi).

State code:	09
District code:	145
Tahsil code:	
Village code:	124109

== Religious Significance ==
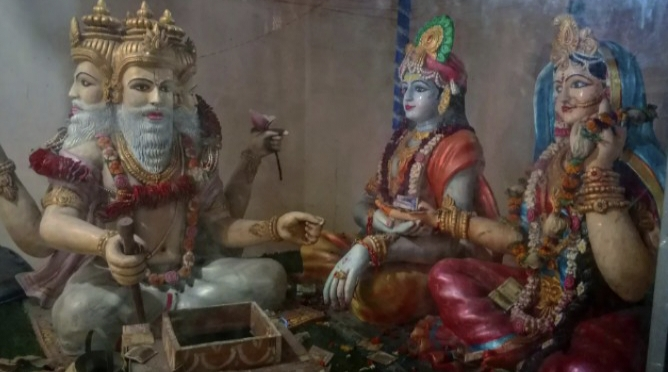
Radha Krishna's marriage is being performed by Brahma in Bhandirvan, Vrindavan.

Raval holds profound religious significance as the birthplace of Radha, the eternal consort of Lord Krishna. According to Hindu scriptures and local traditions, Radha was discovered by her father, King Vrishabhanu, in a golden lotus flower floating on the Yamuna River. She is believed to have been born on the eighth day of the bright lunar fortnight in the month of Bhadra, a day celebrated as Radha Ashtami.

The village is an integral part of the Braj Bhoomi pilgrimage circuit, which encompasses various sites associated with the childhood and youth of Radha and Krishna. Devotees believe that visiting Raval allows them to experience the divine energy and love that binds Radha and Krishna's eternal bond. The presence of Radha in her infant form, referred to as 'Ladliji' (darling daughter) in Raval, distinguishes it from Barsana, where she is worshipped in her youthful form ('Kishoriji').

=== Shri Radha Rani Janam Sthal Temple ===
The central point of devotion in Raval is the Shri Radha Rani Janam Sthal Temple (lit. Radha Birthplace Temple), built at the site believed to be Radha's birthplace. The temple houses deities of Radha and Krishna in their childhood forms, with Radha specifically worshipped as 'Ladli-Lal'. The deity of Krishna in this temple is traditionally believed to have been established by Vajranabh, Krishna's great-grandson.

The temple complex includes the 'Garbhgriha' (sanctum sanctorum), which is the exact spot where Radha is said to have appeared. Historically, the Yamuna River flowed near this location, and King Vrishabhanu's palace was situated on its banks. Outside the temple, there is a well-maintained garden with two conjoined trees, one black and one white, which locals believe represent Radha and Krishna. The temple timings vary between summer and winter seasons, accommodating pilgrims throughout the day.

=== Redevelopment and religious tourism ===
Raval, as part of the broader Mathura-Vrindavan region, is included in various development initiatives aimed at enhancing pilgrimage and tourism infrastructure. The Mathura-Vrindavan Development Authority (MVDA) oversees planned development, aiming to improve basic services and facilitate the large influx of pilgrims visiting the region annually. While specific redevelopment plans exclusively for Raval's temple are not always separately detailed, the broader Braj Teerth Development Plan focuses on improving regional connectivity, conservation of cultural and natural heritage, and upgrading pilgrimage centers. These efforts include improving roads, public amenities, interpretation centers, and accommodation facilities across the Braj region, which would indirectly benefit Raval as a key pilgrimage site.

Member of parliament Hema Malini has adopted the village under the Sansad Adarsh Gram Yojana announced by Prime Minister of India.

== Demography ==
The residents or natives of Rawal and surroundings are called Brijwasi. The village had a population of 2753 at the time of the 2011 census of India.

Particulars	Total	Male	Female	Comments
Total No. of Houses	409	—	—	(census 2011)
Population	2753	1,396	1,357	(census 2011)
Child (0–6)	497	245	252	(census 2011)
Schedule Caste	557	289	251	(census 2011)
Literacy	63.92%	77.58%	49.68%	(census 2011)
Total Workers	857	629	228	(census 2011)
Main Worker	596	0	0	(census 2011)
Marginal Worker	261	83	178	(census 2011)

== Education ==
=== Schools ===
- Prathmik Vidyalaya Rawal

== Transport ==
=== Rail ===
Mathura Railway Junction

=== Road ===
Rawal Village is well connected to Mathura - Baldev Road.

== Nearby villages ==
=== Cities ===
- Aligarh
- Khair
- Mathura
- Noida
- Vrindavan
- Hodal
- Hathras
- Bajna
- Raya
- Surir

=== Villages & town ===
- Bhidauni
- Auhawa Bangar
- Kewat Nagla
- Shihavan Bangar
- Bhadanwara
- Bera, Mathura
- Karahari

== See also ==
- Krishna
  - Krishna Janmasthan Temple Complex, Krishna's birthplace
  - Govardhan
  - Nandgaon, Uttar Pradesh
