= Bhadanwara =

Bhadanwara Bhadanvaro
- Village
- Bhadanwara location in Uttar Pradesh, India Bhadanwara (India)
- Coordinates: 27.780142°N 77.731093°E
- Country: India
- State: Uttar Pradesh
- District: Mathura
- Lok Sabha: Mant
- Vidhan Sabha: Mathura

Government
  - Body: Gram panchayat
- Elevation: 189 m (620 ft)

Population (2001)
  - Total: 7,356

Languages
  - Official: Hindi, English,
  - Local: Braj Bhasha
- Time zone: UTC+5:30 (IST)
- PIN: 281205
- Telephone code: 05663
- Vehicle registration: UP85 XXXX
- Nearest city: Khair, Raya, Bajna, Mathura

Bhadanwara is a village and Panchayat of five villages situated at the Tentigaon-Khair Road in Mant Tehsil of Mathura district, Uttar Pradesh. Bhadnwara Village is located 43 kilometers away from Mathura and only 26 kilometers from Khair city.

== Geography ==
Bhadanwara's pin code is 281205 and postal head office is Surir. It is 2 km from Surir and 5 km from Taintgaon.

== Education ==
There is no institution for graduation. Students of the area go to Khair and Mathura colleges for studies.

== Politics ==
Mant is the Vidhan Sabha constituency. Mathura is the parliamentary constituency.

== Transportation ==
The UPSRTC bus is available in the morning and evening to Mathrua City and Delhi City.

A private bus service runs from Khair to Tentigaon every hour.

Personal vehicles like bicycles, bulks cart, and camel carts are commonplace in the village. A private bus service also runs every hour.

== Nearby cities and villages ==
Bhadanwara is connected with two state cities, Uttar Pradesh and Haryana, as well as Agra region and Aligarh region.

Aligarh	Khair	Hathras
Mathura	Vrindavan	Noida
Hodal	Palwal	Ballabhgarh

Villages

- Surir
- Bera, Mathura
- Kewat Nagla
- Bhidauni
