= Amera, Uttar Pradesh =

Amera
- Village
- Country: India
- State: Uttar Pradesh
- District: Mathura
- Lok Sabha: Mant (Assembly constituency)
- Vidhan Sabha: Mathura

Government
  - Type: Local government in India
  - Body: Gram Panchayat
- Elevation: 189 m (620 ft)

Population (2011)
  - Total: 2,088

Languages
  - Official: Hindi
  - Local: Braj Bhasha
- Time zone: UTC+5:30 (IST)
- PIN: 281205
- Vehicle registration: UP85 XXXX
- Nearest city: Vrindavan, Bajna, Khair, Raya, Mathura
- Nearest Village: Bhidauni,

Amera is a village in the Mat taluk of Mathura district, Uttar Pradesh, India. The village is about 15 kilometres from sub district Mat and 23 km away from district headquarters Mathura. The residents or natives of Amera Village and Nearby Villages are called Brijwasi. The village had a population of 2088 at the time of the 2011 census of India. The sex ratio was 1164 and child sex ratio is 924 at that time and now its growing per year.

== Near by villages ==
- Kharaut
- Bhidauni
- Kotwan
