= Auhawa Bangar =

- Village
- Auhava Bangar location in Uttar Pradesh, India
- Coordinates: 27.75651°N 77.69208°E
- Country: India
- State: Uttar Pradesh
- District: Mathura
- Lok Sabha: Mant
- Vidhan Sabha: Mathura

Government
  - Type: Panchayat Raj
- Elevation: 189 m (620 ft)

Population (2001)
  - Total: 3,398

Languages
  - Official: Hindi, English,
  - Local: Braj Bhasha
- Time zone: UTC+5:30 (IST)
- PIN: 281205
- Telephone code: 05663
- Vehicle registration: UP85 XXXX
- Nearest city: Raya, Bajna, Mathura
- Nearest Villages: Bhidauni, Shihavan Bangar, Kewat Nagla

Auhawa Bangar is a village in Nohjhil Block, Mant Tehsil in Mathura District of Uttar Pradesh, India. It belongs to Agra Division. It is located 32 km north of district headquarters Mathura, and 13 km from Nohjhil.

== Geography ==
According to Census 2011, the location code or village code of Auhawa Bangar village is 123928.

The village had a lower literacy rate compared to Uttar Pradesh. In 2011, the literacy rate of Auhawa Bangar village was 63.80% compared to 67.68% of Uttar Pradesh.

Mat is the nearest town to Auhawa Bangar village.

== Politics ==
Mant is the Vidhan Sabha constituency. Mathura is the parliamentary constituency.

== Nearby cities and villages ==
Cities

- Aligarh
- Hathras
- Hodal
- Khair
- Mathura
- Noida
- Vrindavan

Villages

- Bhidauni
- Kewat Nagla
- Shihavan Bangar
- Surir
