= Abhaipura Banger =

- Village
- Abhaipura Banger Location in Uttar Pradesh, India Abhaipura Banger (India)
- Coordinates: 27.911657°N 77.620393°E
- Country: India
- State: Uttar Pradesh
- District: Mathura
- Lok Sabha: Mant
- Vidhan Sabha: Mathura

Government
  - Body: Gram panchayat Individual
- Elevation: 189 m (620 ft)

Population (2001)
  - Total: 169

Languages
  - Official: Hindi, English,
  - Local: Braj Bhasha
- Time zone: UTC+5:30 (IST)
- PIN: 281205
- Telephone code: 05663
- Vehicle registration: UP85 XXXX
- Nearest city: Raya, Bajna, Mathura

Abhaipura Banger is a village in Mant Tehsil of Mathura district, Uttar Pradesh, near Mat Mula and Surir. The location code is 123803.

== Politics ==
Mant (Assembly constituency) is the Vidhan Sabha constituency. Mathura (Lok Sabha constituency) is the parliamentary constituency.
