= Jatpura, Mathura =

Jatpura
- Village
- Country: India
- State: Uttar Pradesh
- District: Mathura
- Tehsil: Mant
- Block: Nauhjhil
- Gram Panchayat: Jatpura

Population (2011)
  - Total: 890

Language
  - Official: Hindi
  - Dialect: Brajbhasha
- Time zone: UTC+5:30 (IST)
- PIN: 281203
- Telephone code: 0565
- Vehicle registration: UP-85
- Lok Sabha constituency: Mathura
- Website: mathura.nic.in

Jatpura is a village in the Nohjhil block in the Mathura District of Uttar Pradesh, India. Its jurisdiction falls under the Jatpura Panchayat, which belongs to the Agra Division. It is located 53 kilometers north of the district headquarters of Mathura. Jatpura is four km from Nohjhil, and 396 km from the capital of Uttar Pradesh, Lucknow.

== Geography ==
Jatpura's PIN code is 281203, its postal head office is in Bajna (Mathura).

Nearby villages to Jatpura are Kolahar (two km), Shall (two km), Shankar Garhi (two km), Chandpur Kalan (four km), and Sultan Patti (four km). Jatpura is surrounded by the Khair and Gonda blocks toward the east; and the Tappal and Chandaus blocks to the north.

Aligarh, Hodal, Vrindavan, Mathura are nearby cities to Jatpura.

== Demographics ==
Jatpura's local language is Hindi. The total population of Jatpura Village is 887, and the number of houses is 147. The female population is 46.4%. The village literacy rate is 67.8%, and the female literacy rate is 25.6%. The village Pradhan (sarpanch)is Khyaliram Chaudhary (Tau G), who actively represents the local community and oversees developmental activities..
