= Bakla (disambiguation) =

In Tagalog, bakla mainly refers to male homosexual persons.

It may also refer to several geographical locations:

- Bəklə, Azerbaijan
- Bakla, Bangladesh
- Bakla, Uttar Pradesh
- Bakla, Vezirköprü, Samsun Province, Turkey
