= Badanpur =

Badanpur may refer to any of the following villages:

- Badanpur, Magura, in Magura District, Bangladesh
- Badanpur, Mathura, in Mathura district, Uttar Pradesh, India
- Badanpur, Narwana, in Narwana Tehsil, Haryana, India
