= Amera =

Amera may refer to:

== People ==
- Amera Eid, Australian belly dancer
- Amera Khalif (1929-2022), Jordanian sports shooter

== Other uses ==
- MS Amera, a cruise ship
- Ben Amera, a monolith in Mauritania
- Amera, a village in Uttar Pradesh, India
- Psilotreta amera, a species of insect in the genus Psilotreta
- Amera, a surname used by Rajput Community from Amergarh, Rajasthan
