= Bajna =

Bajna may refer to:

- Bajna, Hungary
- Bajna, India
- Bajna, Pakistan
