= Bhidauni =

- Village
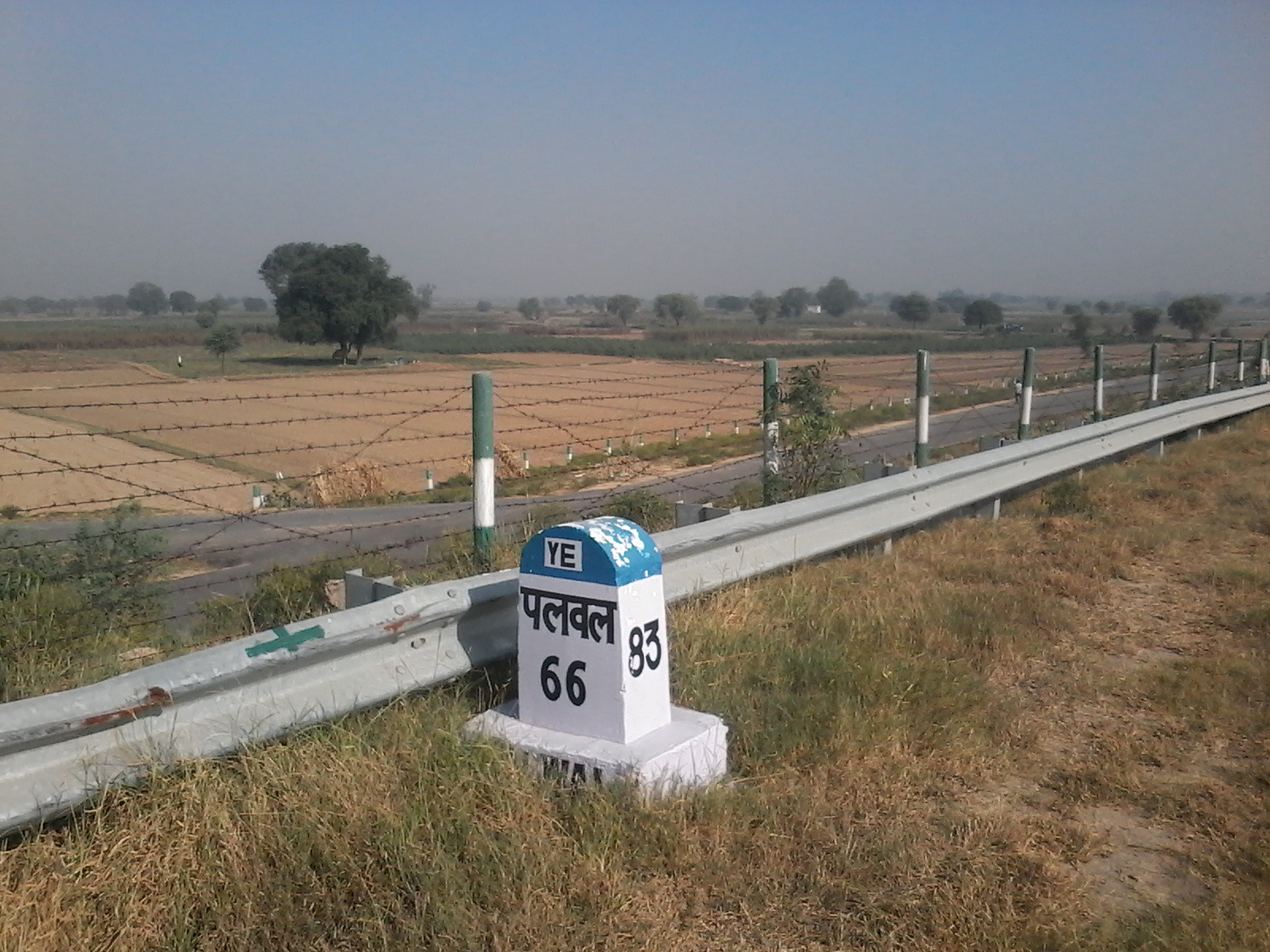

- Location of Bhidauni on the map of Uttar Pradesh Bhidauni (India)
- Coordinates: 27°45′25″N 77°41′40″E
- Country: India
- State: Uttar Pradesh
- District: Mathura
- Lok Sabha: Mathura
- Vidhan Sabha: Mant

Government
  - Type: Local government in India
  - Body: Gram Panchayat
  - Pradhan: Laxmi Devi
- Elevation: 189 m (620 ft)

Population (2011)
  - Total: 3,256

Languages
  - Official: Hindi
  - Local: Braj Bhasha
- Time zone: UTC+5:30 (IST)
- PIN: 281205
- Vehicle registration: UP85 XXXX
- Nearest city: Vrindavan, Bajna, Khair, Raya, Mathura
- Website: bhidauni.com

Bhidauni is a village and Gram panchayat of two villages, Nagla Nahariya and Bhidauni officially known as Bhidauni Bangar located between the Yamuna river and Yamuna Expressway in the Mat Tehsil of Mathura district, Uttar Pradesh, India. It is situated approximately 45 kilometers (28 miles) away from Mathura City, on the Raya Road connecting via Mant to Naujheel Road.

== History ==
Bhidauni is a large village and gram panchayat in Nauhjheel Block of Mant Tehsil in Mathura district, Uttar Pradesh. The Census of India 2011 recorded Bhidauni Bangar as a separate revenue village in Nohjhil community development block, Mathura district, under village code 123925. Its recorded population was 3,256, living in 485 households, and its geographical area was 384.43 hectares. The adjoining revenue village of Bhidauni Khadar (village code 123926) was recorded as uninhabited in the same census.

=== Early history ===
According to British Officer F. S. Growse's Mathurá: A District Memoir (1883), Bhidauni was founded by Puhapa, a Rajput. In the village directory under Pargana Mat, Growse recorded that Kayasths held 10 biswas, Jayas Thakurs 7½ biswas, and Athwaraya Brahmans 2½ biswas of land. He also mentioned two temples dedicated to Bihari and Larli Lal, as well as a hamlet called Nahariya.

== Geography ==
At an average elevation of 189 meters (600 feet), Bhidauni is situated just 2 kilometers (1.2 miles) away from the Yamuna Expressway, also known as the Taj Expressway, which connects Agra to Greater Noida and Delhi.

State code	09
District code	145
Tahsil code	00762
Gram Panchayat Code:	78175
Village code	123925

=== Topography ===
According to the geographical location of Bhiduni village, it is a rural area in the foothills of Yamuna, the plains here are full of sand, which collects river and rain water every year in the area near the river. The soil of Bhidauni Khadar is mainly sandy and alluvial soil is also found in some part of the village.

=== Climate ===
The climate of Bhidauni has a semi-arid climate which is a tropical monsoon one. Mild winters, dry summers, hot sun and hot winds are common in the village, which is also known as rural heat, and is the monsoon season. There is a slight variation in the monsoon, but it rains here with occasional light showers, not as heavy as monsoon in other parts of India.

=== Water Management ===
There is a problem of saline water in the village. The village man has to bring the nearby tubewell and well water to the portable drinking water. farmer's now using deep borewell for farming. With the problem of salt water now drinking water is also being contaminated.

== Demographics ==
=== Population ===
The residents or natives of Bhidauni and surroundings are called Brijwasi. The village had a population of 3,256 at the time of the 2011 census of India. The sex ratio was 880 and child sex ratio is 890. Uttar Pradesh state average for both ratios is 912 and 902 respectively.

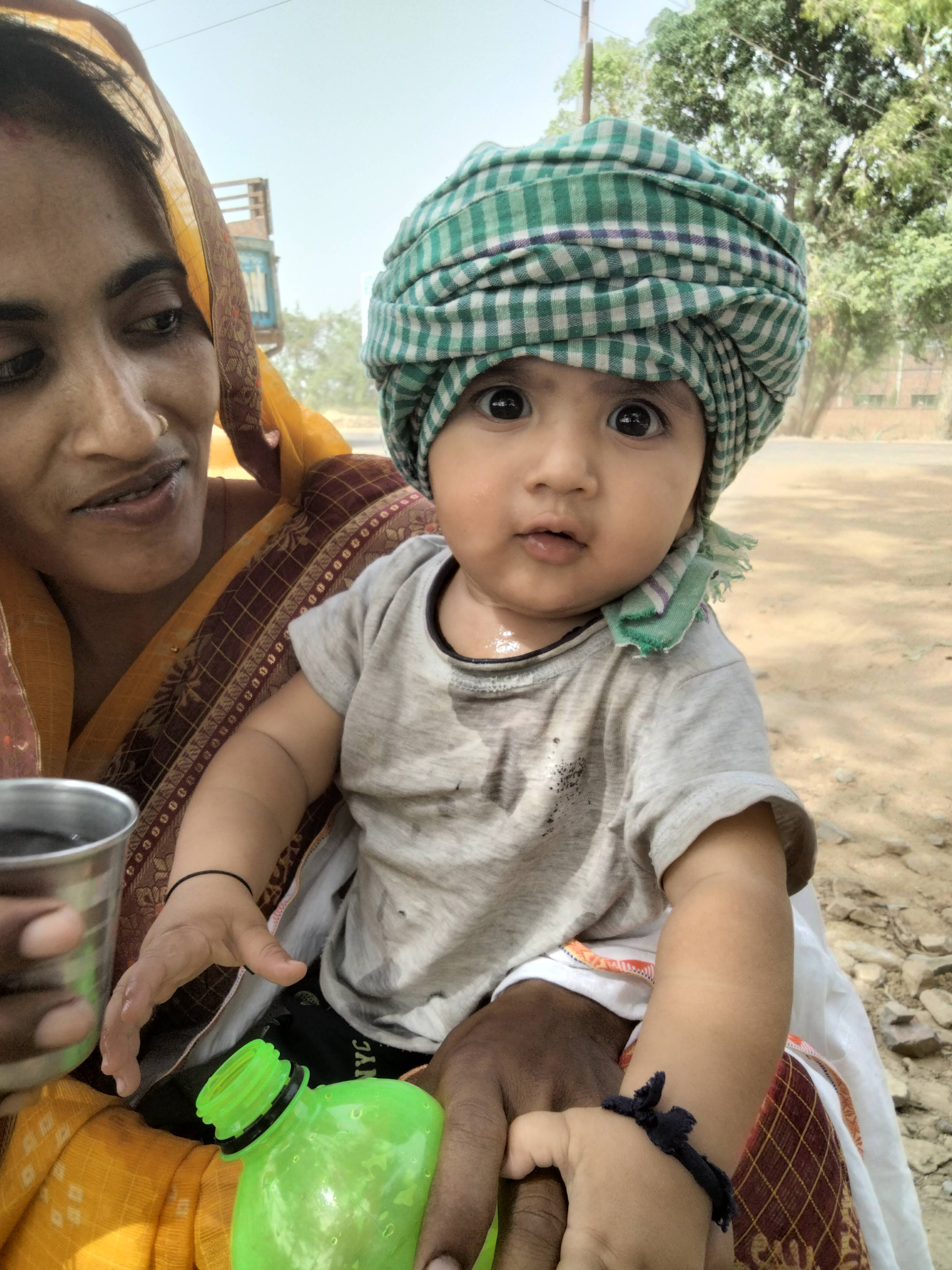
Indian child with turban from Bhidauni Village

Particulars	Total	Male	Female	Comments
Total No. of Houses	485	—	—	(census 2011)
Population	3,256	1,732	1,524	(census 2011)
Child (0–6)	582	308	274	(census 2011)
Schedule Caste	977	506	471	(census 2011)
Literacy	64.36%	76.76%	50.24%	(census 2011)
Total Workers	1,111	817	294	(census 2011)
Main Worker	701	0	0	(census 2011)
Marginal Worker	410	0	0	(census 2011)

There are no people from Scheduled Tribes in the village. The Schedule Castes, constitute 30.01% of the population

=== Ethnicity ===
The caste system is a prominent social system in Bhidauni village, which is primarily determined by an individual's karma. The system is divided into four varnas - Brahmin, Kshatriya, Vaishya, and Shudra, with sub-castes further dividing each varna. The village has scheduled castes like Jatav and Valmiki, along with other backward castes such as Baghel, Kumhar, and Khatik. The general castes consist of Brahmin and Thakur, with a similar ratio of 45%, and one house of Baniya.

Apart from the Hindu castes, However, a small minority of Muslim families also reside in the village. In total, there are eight Hindu castes in the village - Brahmin, Thakur, Baniya, Jatav, Baghel, Kumhar, Nai (Barber), and Kadhere. The caste system and religion have a significant influence on the village's cultural practices and social hierarchy, affecting everything from marriage customs to economic opportunities.

The interplay between caste and religious diversity in Bhidauni village shapes the social and cultural practices of the community and reflects the complex tapestry of India's diversity.

There is a small, separate village for Kewat or Mallah, located approximately 2 kilometers away from Bhidauni village. Several Mallah families reside in this village.

=== Religion ===
Hinduism and Islam are the two main religions practiced in the village, Hinduism is the predominant religion in the village, and the most celebrated festivals are dedicated to Lord Krishna. Janmashtami, the birthday of Lord Krishna, is one of the most important festivals in Bhidauni. The entire village comes alive with the sounds of bhajans, kirtans, and the smell of delicious sweets and snacks. People decorate their houses with lights and flowers, and the temple of Lord Krishna is beautifully decorated with flowers, lights, and rangolis. Devotees gather in large numbers to offer prayers and seek the blessings of Lord Krishna.

Raksha Bandhan is another festival that is widely celebrated in Bhidauni. It is a festival that celebrates the bond between brothers and sisters. Sisters tie rakhi, a sacred thread, on their brothers' wrists as a symbol of their love and protection. Brothers, in turn, pledge to protect their sisters throughout their lives. The festival is celebrated with great enthusiasm, and families come together to share sweets and gifts.

Diwali and Holi are two other major festivals celebrated in the village. Diwali, the festival of lights, is celebrated with the lighting of diyas and candles, decorating homes with rangolis, and bursting crackers. People also visit each other's houses to exchange sweets and gifts. Holi, the festival of colors, is celebrated with the throwing of colors and water on each other. People sing and dance to the beat of dhol and enjoy delicious food and sweets.

Islam is the second-largest religion in Bhidauni, and the village has no mosque Muslims families offer prayers inside thair house and they pray five times a day. The month of Ramadan is an important festival for Muslims, and people fast from dawn to dusk and break their fast in the evening with a feast. Eid-ul-Fitr and Eid-ul-Adha are two other major festivals celebrated by Muslims in the village.

=== Languages ===
The native language of Bhidauni is Hindi and Braj Bhasha.

== Government and politics ==
=== Civic Administration ===
Bhidauni is administrated by a Pradhan (Head of Village) who is an elected representative. The village follows the Panchayati raj system.

=== List of Gram Pradhan ===
Name	Reserved	Caste	Tenure	Total	Opposition	Margin	Achievement	Remark
Ram Ballabh Bhattacharyya	General	Kayastha	1952 to 1954	2 year				
Kumar	General	Thakur	1954–1958	3 Year				
Babu Lal	General	Brahmin	(1959–60) – (1985)	25 Year				
Kisan Lal Thakur	General	Thakur	1985–1990	5 Year			Fields Distribution	
Lala Ram	General	Brahmin	1990–1995	6 year			Road Development	
Rammo	SC	Valmiki	1995–2000	5 year				
Laccho	OBC (Female)	Nishad (Female)	2000–2005	5 year				
Khushi Ram Thakur	General	Thakur	2005–2010	5 year				
Meera Devi	General (Female)	Thakur	2010–2015	5 Year	Dr. Mahesh Rawat		Roads Development	
Kartar Singh	SC	Jatav	25 Dec 2015 to 25 Dec 2020 Onwards	5 year	Rammo Valmiki	39.91%	School, Roads	
Laxmi Devi	General (Female)	Brahmin	Assumed office 3 May 2021	6Y	Meera Devi	57	Safai Abhiyan	

=== Ward Members ===
Current civic administration body of village consists of 14 ward members elected in 2021.

=== Politics ===
Mant (Assembly constituency) is the Vidhan Sabha constituency. Mathura (Lok Sabha constituency) is the parliamentary constituency.

=== Civic Utility / Amenities / Services ===
Medical/health

There is no hospital or health centre in the village, so its residents have to go to nearby towns and cities for treatment. After years in 2020–21, dozens of people died of dengue fever in Bhidauni village, hundreds of people have come under dengue fever, on the orders of the village district magistrate, the primary school of the village has been made a temporary hospital and a 24-hour ambulance facility has been made. People have taken it as an epidemic.

Cowshed (Gaushaala)

Disturbed by the bovine wandering in the open in the village, farmers barricaded the wires on the land of cows and closed more than 200 cows in the open and a temporary cowshed has been built, the villagers provided fodder water for the cows a committee has been constituted to take care of and according to the Department of Revenue, this gaushala has been built on government land and for this, there are assurances by the officials about some grants from the government, but till now neither the grant from the Yogi government nor any facility has been received for the gaushala.

== Economy ==
The village's main occupation is agriculture. Farmers mainly produce wheat, mustard (or rapeseed), potato and other vegetables. Production of paddy has been introduced recently with the introduction of deep bore-wells. Sub-soil water is the main source of irrigation. Farmer use tractors for farm works. Many families there live in poverty. Some are farm workers, some of the people go to neighbouring cities for extra income or their livelihood. Some people work near the cities and some are involved in defence services. There are also poor labourers who work at the local brick kilns

=== Digital initiatives ===
Bhidauni village has been the site of grassroots digital initiatives aimed at integrating technology into rural governance and agriculture. Led by local digital entrepreneur Bablu Baghel, the village's Jan Seva Kendra (Common Service Centre) was adapted to serve as an advisory and informational hub under the Mission AI-Bhidauni project. The initiative utilizes digital tools to interpret climate patterns, weather forecasts, and soil health advisories into local dialects, drawing coverage in national media for rural technology adoption.

== Transport ==
Villagers have been using their personal vehicles to reach travel from one place to other villages and the city. For travelling to nearby villages motorcycle, Tractor are more popular. Bullcart or camel cart are still used in villages as means of transport.

=== By Rail ===
Mathura Railway Junction around 45 kilometres (28 mi) is the nearest railway junction.

The nearest railway stations in and around Bhidauni Bangar:

- Chhata Railway Station 39.6 km (24.6 mi).
- Kosi Kalan Railway Station, 42.8 km (26.6 mi).
- Raya Railway Station 31.9 km (19.8 mi). (via Raya — Mant Rd)

=== By Road ===
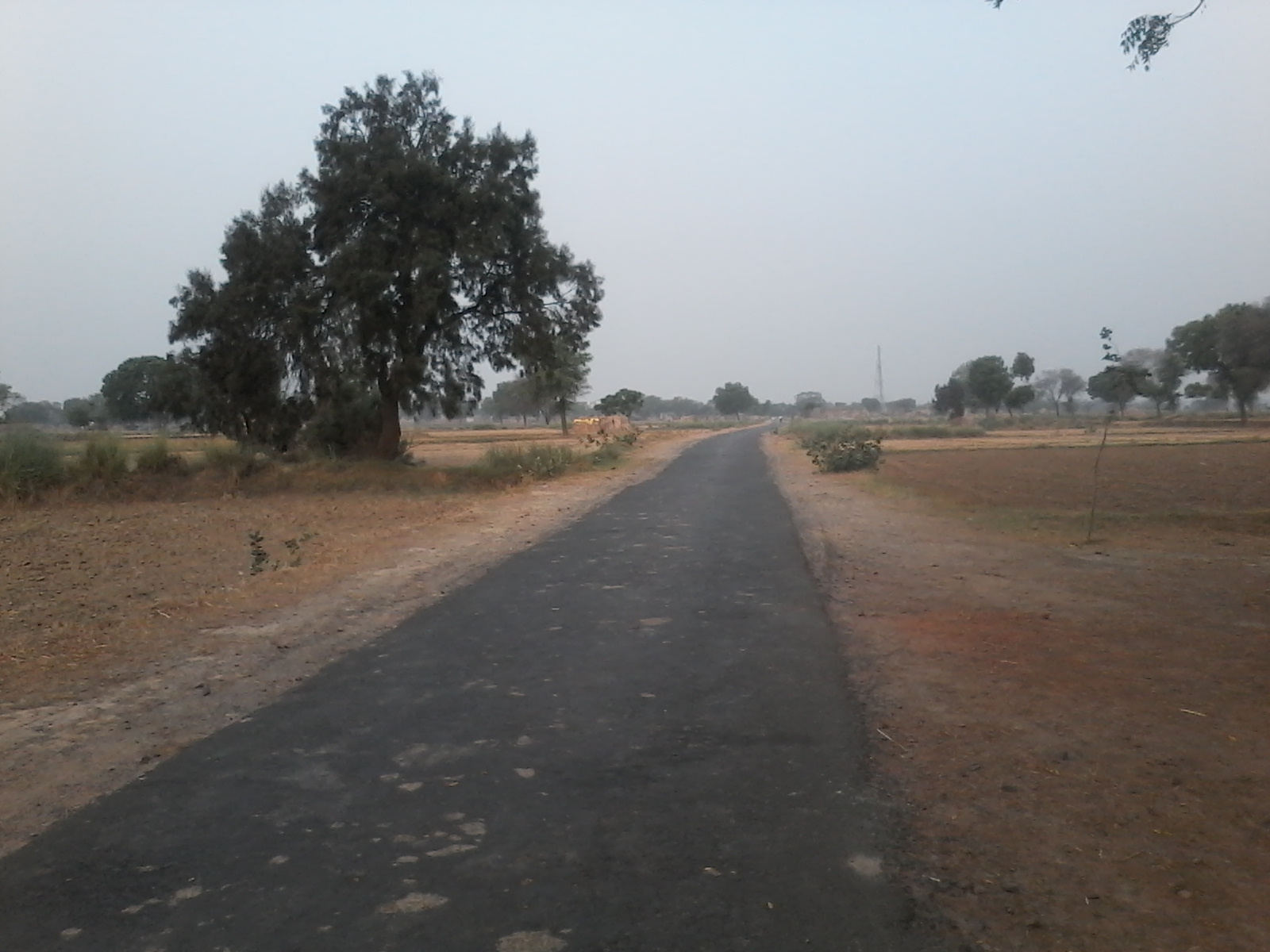
The Road is connect to Bhidauni village & Surir village to main that connects farmers.

Bhidauni Village is connected to major road Yamuna Expressway though Raya Cut & Vrindavan Cut and Surir bypass is also afflicted to get off but not an authorized Stop. Raya — Bajna Road also connects to Mathura and in fact shortest way to reach Bhidauni vai Surir by road.

=== By Air ===
Airports present near Bhidauni are:

- Aligarh Airport 46.6 km (29.0 mi).
- Agra Air Force Station 73.0 km (45.4 mi).
- Safdarjung Airport 102.3 km (63.6 mi).

== Education ==
There is a primary school and Government Higher Secondary School run by the Uttar Pradesh Board of Secondary Education, there is a hand pump and a summerable pump for the provision of fresh water for the children, there is a children's play garden which is in the school courtyard around which And green trees are planted. There is also a private school, Hariram Inter College, which is recognized by the Uttar Pradesh government, but the children of the village study up to Intermediate.

=== Schools ===
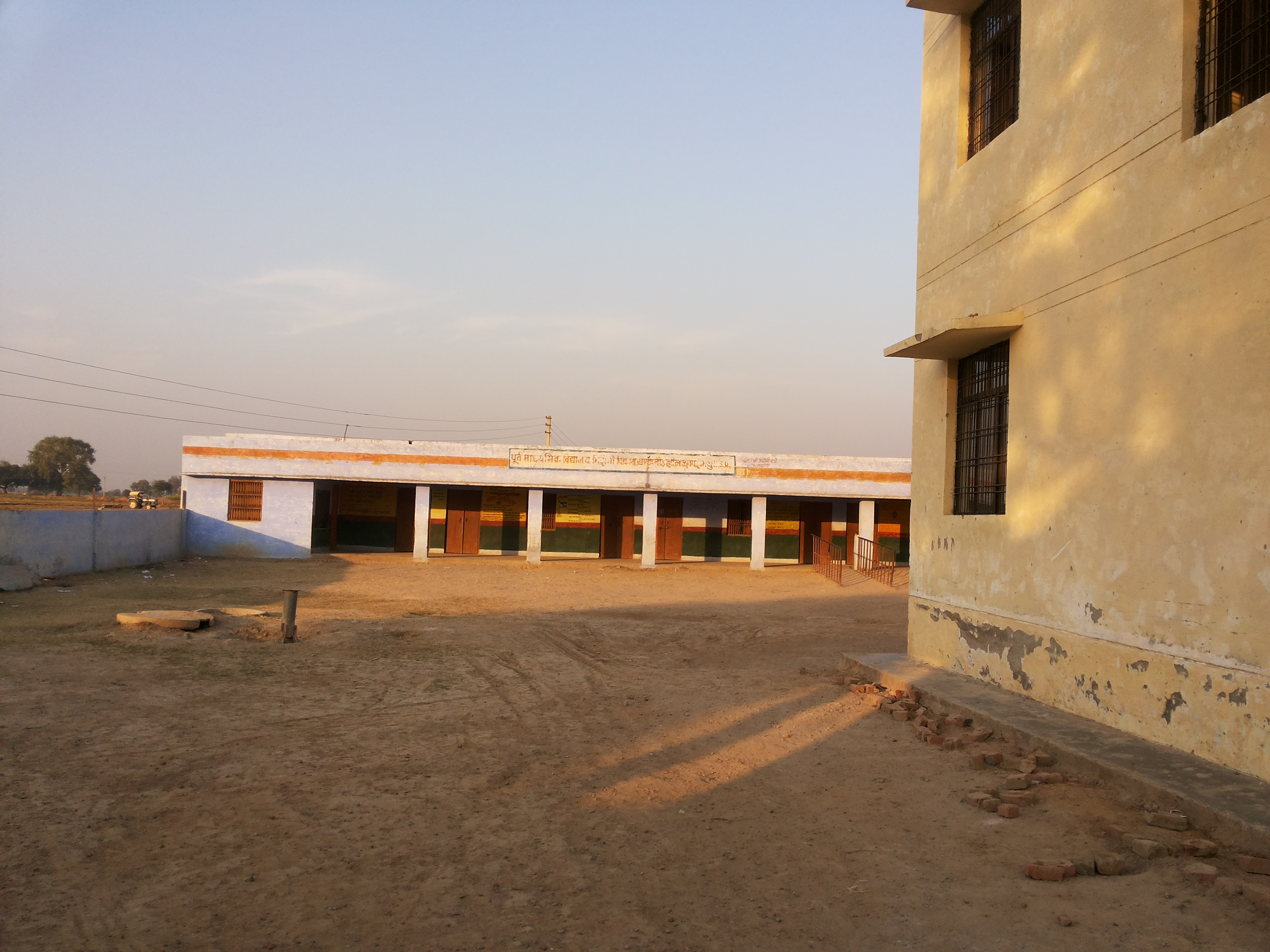
Government Junior High School near bhidauni village.

- Prathmik Vidyalaya Bhidauni
- Junior High School Bhidauni (Purva Madhyamik Vidyalaya)
- Government Higher Secondary School
- Kundan Lal Hariram Inter College

=== Colleges ===
- Rashtriya Inter College Surir, Uttar Pradesh 281205
