= Ahamadpur =

Village in Uttar Pradesh, India

Coordinates: 20°57′N 77°26′E

Ahamadpur is a village in located in Mant Tehsil of Mathura district, Uttar Pradesh, India. The village belongs to Agra Division.

== Geography ==
This village is located near to Bajna township. Pin code of village is 281201.

== Politics ==
Mant (Assembly constituency) is the Vidhan Sabha constituency. Mathura (Lok Sabha constituency) is the parliamentary constituency.
