= Ghanghauli =

- village
- Location in Uttar Pradesh, India Ghanghauli (India)
- Coordinates: 27.88°N 78.08°E
- Country: India
- State: Uttar Pradesh
- Assembly constituency: Khair
- District: Aligarh

Government
  - Body: Gram Panchayat
  - Pradhan: Vivek Kumar(Kali Pahalwan)
- Elevation: 188 m (617 ft)

Population (2011)
  - Total: 3,209

Languages
  - Official: Hindi
- Time zone: UTC+5:30 (IST)
- PIN: 202165
- Vehicle registration: UP-81

Ghanghauli is a village in Khair tehsil of Aligarh district in the Indian state of Uttar Pradesh. It is located 52km towards west from district head quarters Aligarh. Yamuna Express Way from Greater Noida to Agra also passes through this village.

== Demographics ==
Ghanghauli is inhabited by 546 families. According to Census of India 2011, the population was 3208, including 1727 males and 1481 females. It's literacy rate is above that of Uttar Pradesh at 72.32% compared to 67.68% in Uttar Pradesh.

Ghanghauli Data
Particulars	Total	Male	Female
Total No. of Houses	546		
Population	3208	1727	1481
Child (0-6)	466	263	203
Literacy	72.32%	85.66%	57.04%

== Governance ==
As per the Constitution of India and Panchayati Raj Act, Ghanghauli is administrated by a Pradhan who is an elected representative of the village.

== Education ==
Schools/Colleges:

- Poorv Madhymik Vidhyalaya, Ghanghauli, Aligarh
- Shiksha Vikas Sabha, Ghanghauli, Aligarh (now closed)
- Shri Lehri Singh Memorial Inter College, Ghanghauli, Aligarh

== Sports ==
- Cricket
- Kabbadi
- Volleyball
- Running (Sprinting)
- Long Jump & High Jump
- Wrestling

== Nearby Villages ==
Jaidpura, Jaldgarhi, Gaurola, Managarhi, Chandpur Khurd, Kheriya Khurd, Gaurola-Nagliya.
