= Shri Alkheswar Mahadev Mandir =

Coordinates: 27°48′46.78″N 77°46′10.29″E

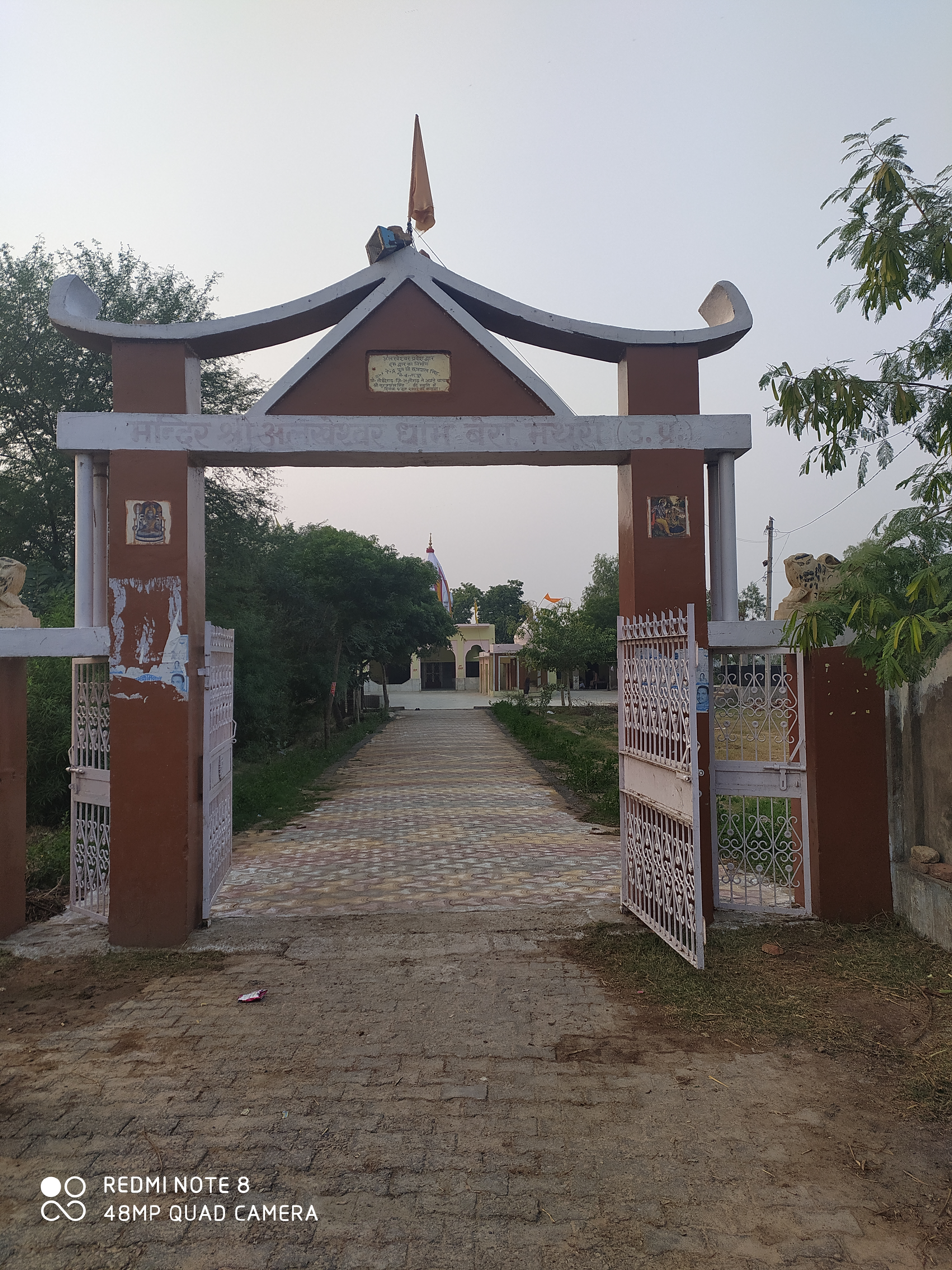
Temple Gate

Shri Alkheswar Mahadev Mandir is a sacred temple of Alkheshwar mahadev otherwise known among locals as Alakh Baba.

The temple is located in the village of Bera, in the Mathura District in the Indian state of Uttar Pradesh. It was constructed by Jayas in ancient times.

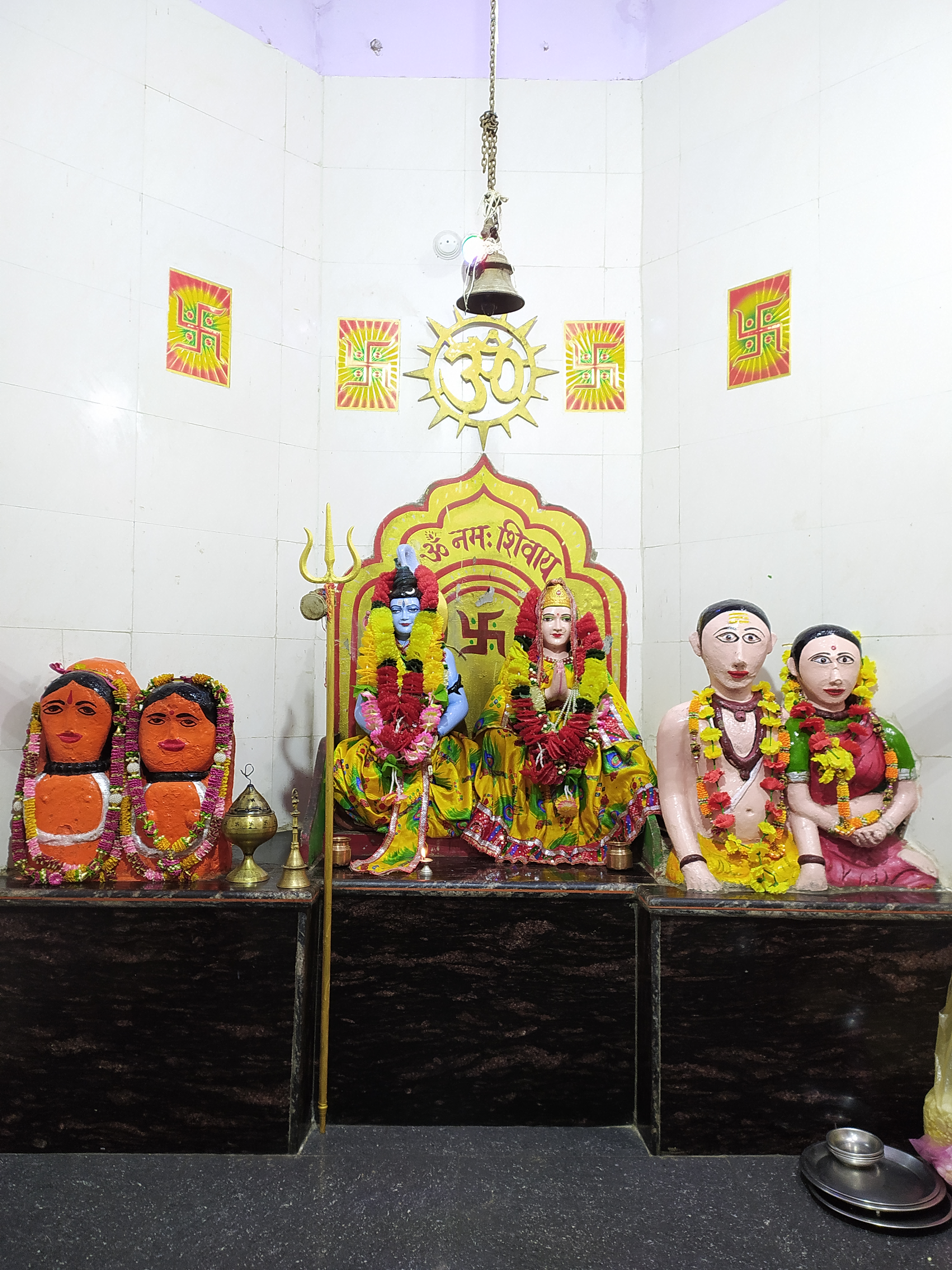
Alakh Baba Pratima

== The Temple Complex ==
The complex has two big entry gates, one being used more often. There are temples of all the major Gods. The main temple is dedicated to lord Shiva while others are of deities like Ram, Sita, Ganesha, Brahma, Durga, Radha, Krishna, Shani, Hanuman and more. There is a Havan Kund too.

The idol of Lord Shiva in the main temple was found in Alkheswar Kund, a nearby water pond. There are different kinds of plants found here. Two motor water pumps serve water to the temple. Drinking water is available to the devotees. On the distant corner of the complex there is a public toilet. A vast playground separates the toilet from the main temple area. A lot of children and teenagers can be seen here playing in the evening

== Festivals ==
A fair is organized in the month of march every year. The fair being held inside the temple complex is organized by Alkheshwar Mandir Samiti. The temple and pond are centers of religious activities. From early in the morning till late evening devotees can be seen all around the temple. During the Hindu festivals like Holi and Diwali the temple attracts huge crowds. Mahashivratri attracts the most. The music and dance during Mahashivratri leave no one unattached.

== Alkheshwar Kund ==
It is a very big pond adjacent to temple complex. A lot of water life dwells in it. Many kind of fishes, snails, snakes, turtles can be seen here. Fishing has been permitted in the pond by the gram panchayat. There are old wells in middle of the pond. On the other side of the pond there are large pastures. Local shepherds graze their cattle there. Various kinds of migratory birds can be seen here in winters.
