= Raskhan =

Indian poet

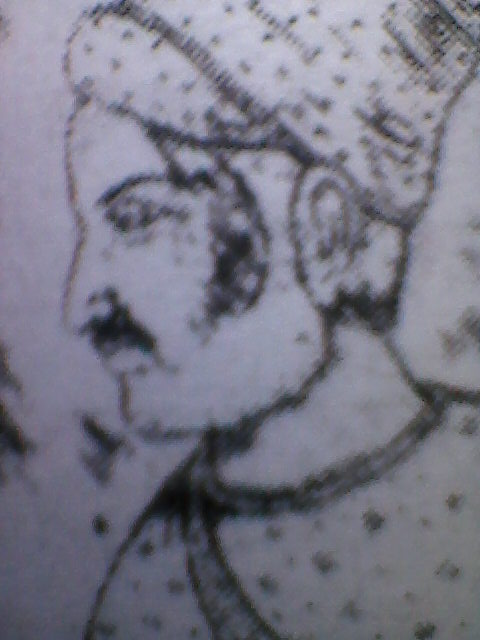
- Name: Mahan Raskhan
- Born: 1548
- Birth Place: Amroha, Delhi Subah, Mughal Empire or Kabul, Kabul Subah, Mughal empire
- Died: 1628 (aged 79–80)
- Death Place: Vrindavan, Delhi Subah, Mughal Empire
- Poetry Collection: Raskhan Rachnavali, Sujan Raskhan, Prem Vatika
- Country: India

Syed Ibrahim Khan (1548-1628) was an Indian born Muslim poet of Afghan descent or an Afghan born muslim who settled in India. He became an initiated vaishnav devotee of the Hindu deity Krishna. He was born in Pihani (Hardoi) His birth name was Saiyad Ibrahim and Raskhan was his initiated name in Hindi. In his early years, he became a follower of Krishna, learned the bhakti marga from Vitthalanathaji and began living in Vrindavan, where he spent the rest of his life. He accepted Krishna as the supreme god (Svayam Bhagavan) and became a Vaishnava. He left for Goloka in 1628 AD. His samadhi is at Mahaban, about six miles east of Mathura.

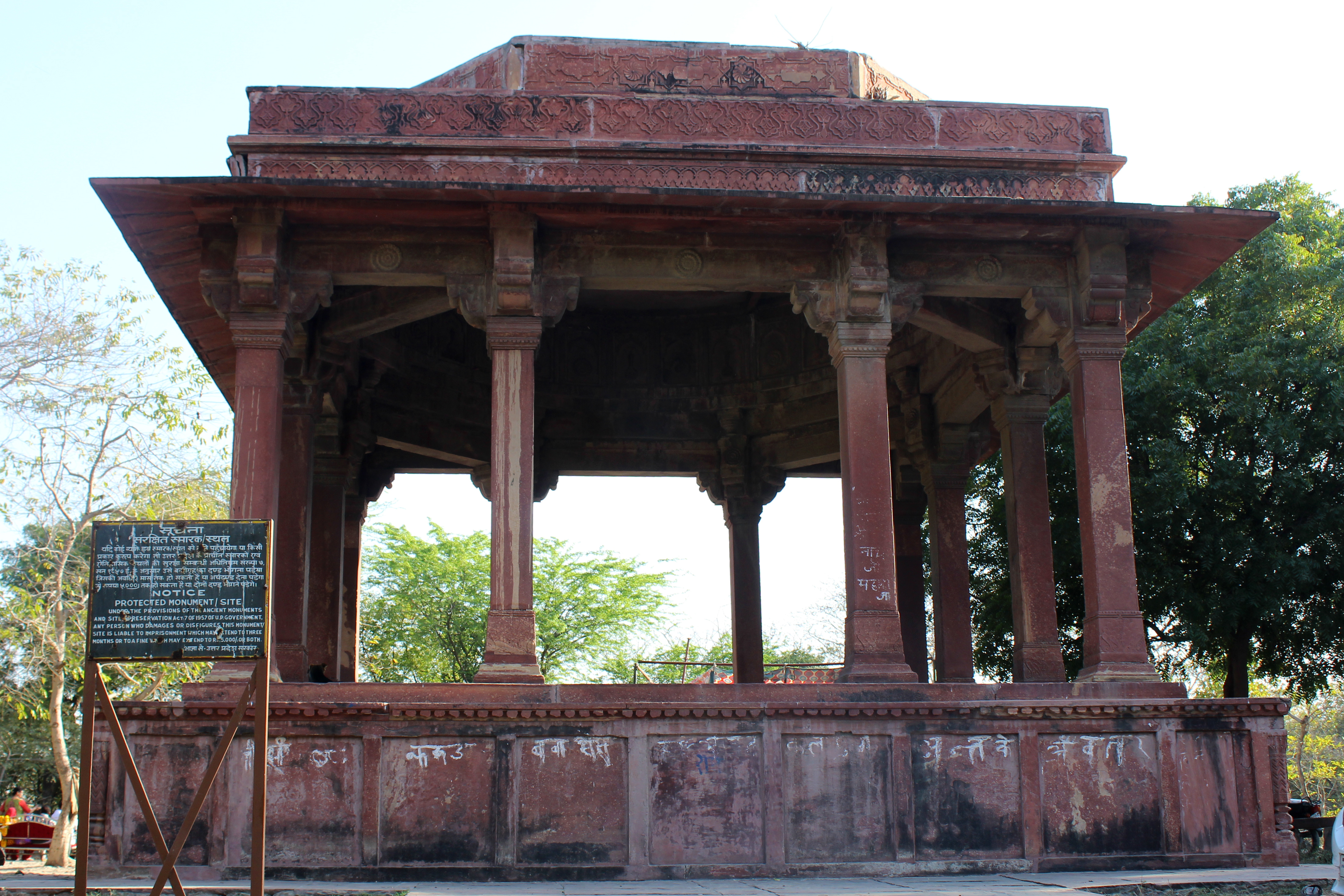
Tomb of Great Poet of India, Raskhan at Mahaban in Mathura Distt. India

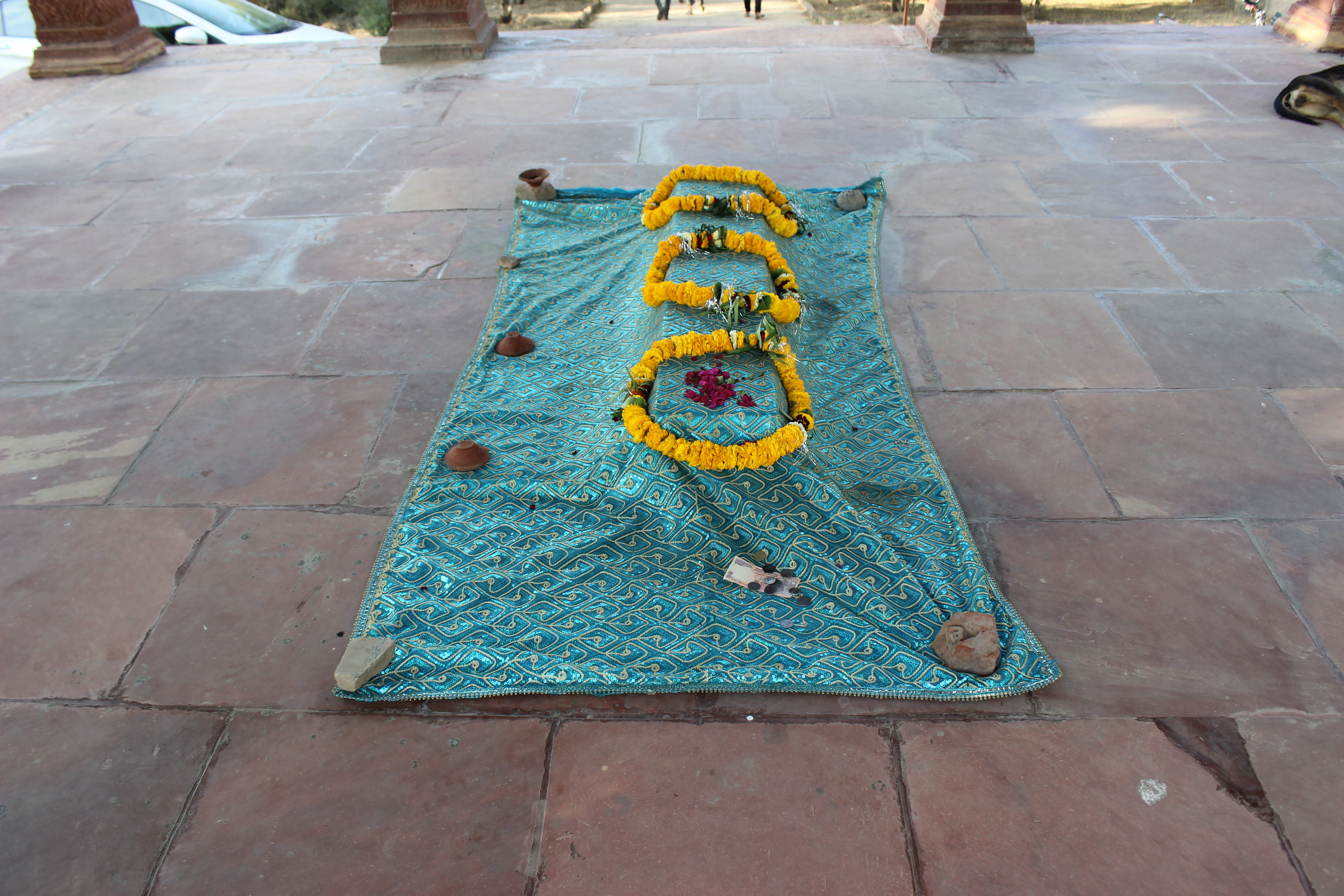
Tomb

== History ==
Scholars disagree about his year of birth. Estimates include 1614 and 1630, while Mishra Bandhu believes that Raskhan was born in 1548 and died in 1628. Most of the scholars say Raskhan was a Pashtun Sardar and his birthplace was Kabul, Afghanistan. Hazari Prasad Dwivedi claims in his book Raskhan was born Syed Ibrahim, and that Khan was his title. Raskhan was the son of a jagirdar (rich landowner) and lived in luxury in his youth. He received a good education. Raskhan spoke both Hindi and Persian; he translated "Bhagavata Purana" into Persian. His shrine is located in Gokul near the Yamuna river, Bhramand Ghat. It is a peaceful place. Multiple Krishna devotees go there to pay their respects and meditate.

According to one story, as contained in the medieval text Bhaktakalpadruma, he once travelled to Vrindavan along with his Sufi preceptor. There he fell unconscious and had a vision of Krishna. Thereafter, he remained in Brindavan till he died.

Another version has it that Raskhan fell in love with a proud woman. Later, when he read the Bhagwat Purana he was so deeply impressed by the unselfish love of the gopis for Krishna that he left his proud mistress and headed straight for Brindavan.

There is, however, an even more intriguing story that is contained in some of the hagiographic material about Raskhan. In the Bhavaprakash of the seventeenth century, we are told by Vaishnavite scholar Hari Ray, that Ibrahim Khan earlier lived in Delhi, where he had fallen madly in love with the son of a Hindu merchant. 'He watched him day and night', says Hari Ray, 'and even ate his left-overs'. This angered his fellow Muslims, who branded him as a disbeliever. But Ibrahim Khan, we are told, did not care or relent, answering, as Hari Ray puts it, 'I am as I am'.

One day, the story goes, he overheard one Vaishnavite telling another, 'One should have attachment to the Lord just as this Ibrahim Khan has for the merchant's son. He roves around after him without fear of public slander or caste displeasure!'. The other Vaishnavite turned up his nose in disgust, and when Ibrahim saw this he drew his sword out in anger. Trembling before him, the Vaishnavite said: 'If you loved God just as you do that boy you would find salvation'. Ibrahim's curiosity having been aroused, he began discussing spiritual matters with him. The Vaishnavite advised Ibrahim to travel to Brindavan. When he got there, he was refused entry into the temple on the grounds that he was a Muslim.

After sitting on the banks of the lake near the temple having not had anything to eat for three days, Krishna, the story goes, appeared to Ibrahim, addressing him as Raskhan or 'the mine of aesthetic essence', and accepting him as a disciple. From that day onwards, Raskhan began living in Brindavan, composing and singing the Krishnaite Sufi poetry for which he is still so fondly remembered.

== Subject matter ==
The poetry of Raskhan focuses on Lord Krishna. "Lilas" of Lord Krishna, such as Bal Lila, Chir Haran Lila, Kunj Lila, Ras Lila, Panghat Lila, and Dan Lila, were his favorite subjects. Apart from Lilas, Raskhan has also created poems on Lord Shankar, Goddess Ganga, and the Holi festival.

== Poetry ==
Raskhan is widely acknowledged as a great poet, having dedicated most of his creations to Lord. He had an imagery in his poetry. Rachnavali is the collection of Raskhan's poetry. His creations describe the beauty of not only Lord Krishna but also his relations with his beloved Radha. His poetry is in the form of Doha, Padawali and Savayya.

Raskhan's Khariboli writings are numerous, the five most important being the Sujana Raskhana, the Premavatika, the Danalila, the Astayama and a collection of Padas (rhymed couplets). Of these the most well-known is the Premavatika ("The Forest of Love").

The Premavatika consists of fifty-three verses, most of which deal with the nature of Divine Love, using the love between Radha and Krishna as a model. Raskhan begins the work, by saying:

The dwelling of Love is Shrimati Radhika,
the son of Nand [i.e. Krishna] is Love's colour.

But the path of Love is not easy, he tells us:

Everybody says: "Love! Love!"
but nobody knows Love,

he adds, because:

If a person knows Love,
why would the world weep?.

After this, he begins a long monologue about the nature of divine Love thusy:

Love is inaccessible, incomparable, immeasurable
It is like the ocean -
He who comes to its shore will not go back
When he drank the wine of Love,
Varuna became the Lord of the waters
Because he drank poison out of Love,
the Lord of the Mountain [Shiva] is worshipped.

When the traveller on the mystical path begins to understand the nature of true love, then external rituals and bonds begin to lose their meaning for him. Thus, says Raskhan:

The rules of the world, the Veda and the world, shame, work and doubt
All these you give up once you practise love
For what are regulations and negations when compared to Love?

'Without Love everything is useless', Raskhan notes, and then adds:

Of Shruti, Puranas, Agamas and Smritis, Love is the essence of all.
Without the knowledge of Love there is no experience of Ananda [bliss]
Knowledge, action, and worship, all of these are the root of pride

Reading the Shastras, you become a Pandit, reciting the Quran, a Maulvi But if you have not known Love in that, what is the use, asks Raskhan?"

From here Raskhan starts an intricate description of the path of Love and surrender to God, in the process questioning all orthodoxies, all formalisms and all man-made divisions. This is in a sense the essence of his message. He ends his work with the following lines:

Tearing his heart away from a haughty woman [i.e. the snares of the world]
Miyam [himself] has become Raskhan once he saw the beauty of Premadeva [The God of Love].

== Shrine of Raskhan ==
His samadhi shrine today stands in a forested area between Mahaban and Gokul in the Mathura district. The site was restored in 2023, along with the tomb of poetess Taj Bibi (Taj Begum) also situated nearby.
