= Chulhawali =

Village in Uttar Pradesh, India

- Village
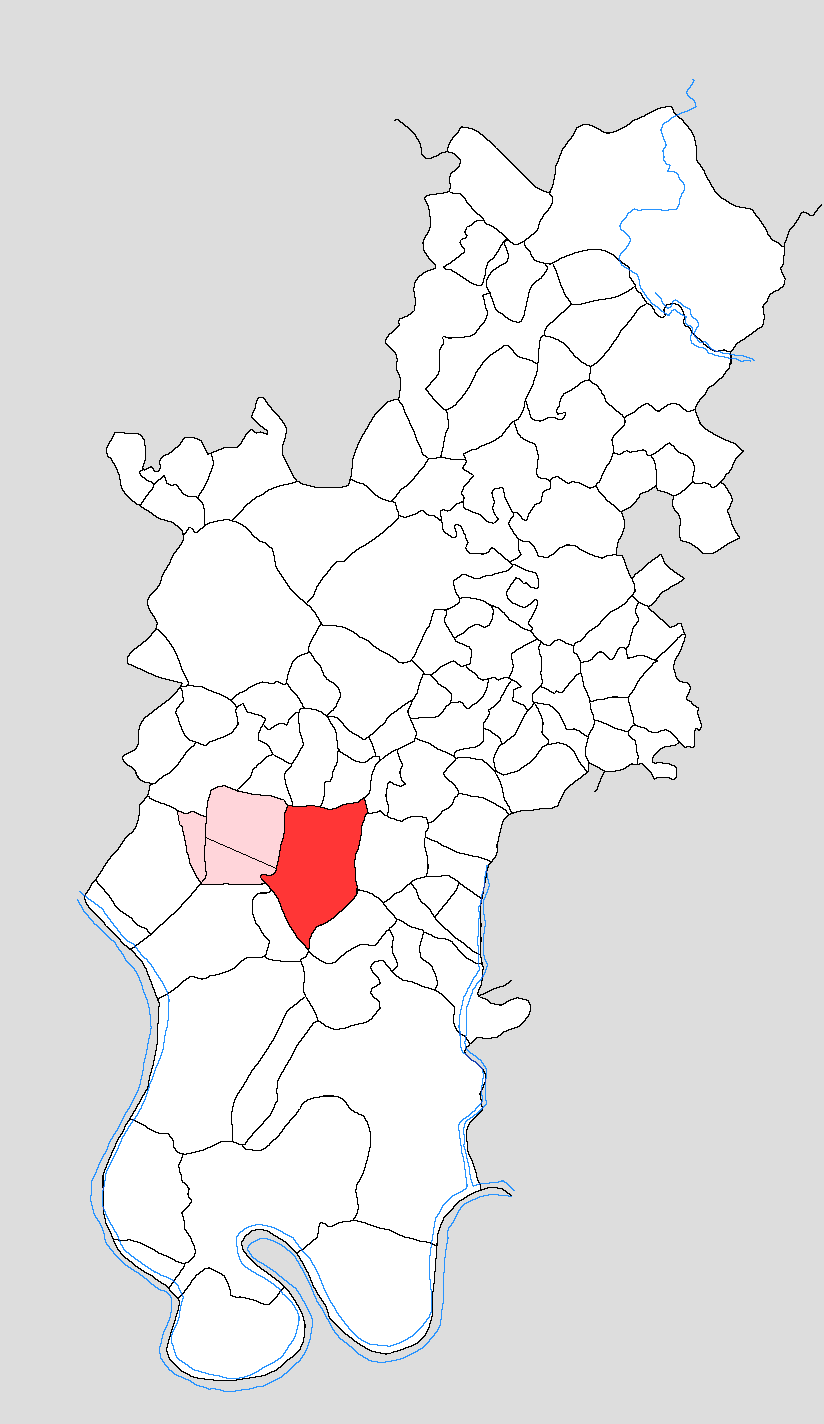
- Map showing Chulhawali in Tundla block

- Location in Uttar Pradesh, India
- Coordinates: 27.20084°N 78.256°E
- Country: India
- State: Uttar Pradesh
- District: Firozabad
- Tehsil: Tundla

Area
  - Total: 7.871 km^{2} (3.039 sq mi)

Population (2011)
  - Total: 7,151
  - Density: 908.5/km^{2} (2,353/sq mi)
- Time zone: UTC+5:30 (IST)
- PIN: 283204

Chulhawali (Chulhāwalī), also spelled Chulhaoli, is a village in Tundla block of Firozabad district, Uttar Pradesh. As of 2011, it has a population of 7,151, in 1,211 households. The population is mainly Hindu, with the most prominent community being Jats of the Solanki gotra. Other castes include Brahmans and Jatavs (ravidasiya).

The village is well connected by road to the nearby town of Tundla and also to the old National Highway 2. The major Tundla Junction railway station is just 2 km from Chulhawali. The main Agra to Kanpur railway line goes through the village, cutting it into two parts. It is known as the village of lawyers as many residents of this village are in the legal practice.

The village is highly congested with narrow gulleys in its inside, making it almost impossible for tractors or four wheelers to reach the houses that are situated inside. However the outer or peripheral area is not congested and tractors can easily get to those houses.

== History ==
At the turn of the 20th century, Chulhawali was described as a large village east of Tundla that belonged to the Jat zamindars of Jarkhi. Like Tundla and Jarkhi, it was then part of the tehsil of Itimadpur.

== Demographics ==
As of 2011, Chulhawali had a population of 7,151, in 1,211 households. This population was 55.5% male (3,970) and 44.5% female (3,181). The 0-6 age group numbered 911 (521 male and 390 female), making up 12.7% of the total population. 2,057 residents were members of Scheduled Castes, or 28.8% of the total.

The 1981 census recorded Chulhawali as having a population of 5,123 people (2,902 male and 2,221 female), in 880 households and 865 physical houses.

The 1961 census recorded Chulhawali as comprising 5 hamlets, with a total population of 3,957 people (2,174 male and 1,783 female), in 689 households and 553 physical houses. The area of the village was given as 1,958 acres.

== Infrastructure ==
As of 2011, Chulhawali had 4 primary schools and 1 primary health centre. Drinking water was provided by tap and hand pump; there were no public toilets. The village had a sub post office but no public library; there was at least some access to electricity for all purposes. Streets were made of both kachcha and pakka materials.

== Education ==
Girdhari Lal inter college, an old and grand one provides better educational facilities for the people of the village. However trend for English medium education among new generation is driving them toward education facilities situated in Tundla.
