= Kalleda =

Village in Telangana, India

Kalleda is a small village in Warangal district, Telangana, India. It is approximately 40 km from Warangal, and neighboring villages include Parvathagiri, Annaram, Naguram, and Ravuru. The population is approximately 5,000, with 2,500 voting members. The official language of Kalleda is Telugu. Kalleda is located at 17°43’22"N and 79°43’27" E, and is at an elevation of 750 feet. The climate is hot and dry with May being the hottest month. The monsoon season follows the summer months and brings most of the annual rainfall.

== Government ==
The village government consists of a Sarpanch and a village officer. The Sarpanch is elected by the townspeople for a five-year term and serves as the village mayor. The village is divided into ten sections, each headed by a ward member. These ward members also help to elect the Sarpanch. The village officer is appointed by the government.

== Culture ==
=== Religion ===
Kalleda is a majority Hindu village, with a small percentage of Muslims and Christians. In accordance with Hindu tradition, villagers celebrate the festivals of Ekadasi, Vinayaka Chavithi, Raksha Bandhan, Dussehra, Diwali, Ugadi, Pongal, and Holi. The Hindu temple in Kalleda is called Kolanu Venkateshwara Swamy Devalyam and was built in the 12th century by the Kakatiya dynasty. Villagers often attend the temple on Saturdays to do Puja, an offering to the gods, and Bajana, ceremonial songs. The historic stone temple was built many centuries ago and was rebuilt in 2009.

=== Sports and Games ===
The two most common indoor games played in Kalleda are Chess and Carrom. Outdoor games include cricket, which is very popular throughout India, volleyball, archery, and football. The local college, Pai Junior College, is especially well known for its archery program. Vardhineni Praneetha, a student trained at the college, competed in the 2008 Beijing Olympics.

=== Cuisine ===
The staples of the diet are rice, lentils, and vegetable curries. Curd is also eaten at most meals. Chicken and mutton are prepared on special occasions such as festivals. Much of the food is flavored with turmeric, chili powder, cardamom, curry leaves and coriander.

== Family life ==
It is common for multiple generations of families to live together in one house. Marriages are arranged by the individuals' families and generally take place when the woman is between 18 and 22 years old and the man is between 21 and 26 years old. Most women are housewives who clean the home, prepare meals, and take care of the children while the men earn a living for the family.

== Education ==
The RDF (Rural Development Foundation) is a non-governmental organization founded in 1996 that runs two schools in Kalleda: Kalleda Rural School and Vanitha Achutha Pai Junior College. RDF maintains the values of punctuality, honesty, and transparency. Kalleda Rural School consists of nursery school through 10th year students and the Junior College consists of 11th and 12th year students. Rammohan and Vandita Rao are the RDF members primarily responsible for managing the schools. The schools are noted for maintaining 50:50 female to male student ratios in an area where males tend to comprise the majority of students. Kalleda Rural School has several unique programs including a youth empowerment program and a student photoblog. Pai Junior College also developed a photoblog to showcase the culture of Kalleda. RDF schools are currently in the process of transitioning to English medium teaching from Telugu medium. Kalleda rural school is helped by many organization. Silver Oaks, Hyderabad helps it too.

== Business and Industry ==
The majority of citizens are farmers and the main crops are rice and cotton. While most farmers are men, women play an important role in rice transplanting. Monsoon season, the rainy season in the late summer and early fall months, is the primary season for planting crops. Herders also play an important role in agriculture. It is their responsibility to lead the village water buffalo and goats to pasture each day. Other typical jobs include tailors, toddy tappers, carpenters, drivers, shop keepers, basket weavers, and teachers.

== Transportation ==
Walking is the primary mode of transportation, followed by bicycles, motorcycles, and autos, which are similar to taxis. Villagers typically travel on buses for longer distance trips. Cars and larger vehicles are uncommon in Kalleda, but more prosperous families may sometimes have them.
