= Talaspur Village =

Talaspur Village Talaspur Kalan
- village
- Location in Uttar Pradesh, India Talaspur Village (India)
- Coordinates: 25°21′23.8″N 83°32′22.9″E
- Country: India
- State: Uttar Pradesh
- District: Aligarh

Government
  - Body: Gram Panchayat

Population
  - Total: 2,000

Languages
  - Official: Hindi
- Time zone: UTC+5:30 (IST)
- PIN: 202101
- Vehicle registration: UP 81
- Nearest cities: Aligarh, Khair
- Lok Sabha constituency: Aligarh
- Civic agency: Gram Panchayat
- Climate: Moderate (Köppen)

Talaspur Kalan is a small village in Aligarh district of Uttar Pradesh, India. According to the Election Commission of India, the total voters in the village is around 2000.

This village also has a relatively rich population of Schedule caste people and was earlier under the "Ambedkar Village" scheme of Uttar Pradesh.

Though just 5 km from the district headquarters, the village was provided with electricity in 1991 and now almost all households have electricity connections. It has only one small elementary school and most of the population is jobless or doing very low grade jobs. However, there is a plot allotted by the government to build school for girls.
