= Kharaut =

Kharaut Kharauth
- Village
- Nickname: Kharot
- Location in Uttar Pradesh, India Kharaut (India)
- Coordinates: 27.832°N 77.452°E
- Country: India
- State: Uttar Pradesh
- District: Mathura
- Elevation: 189 m (620 ft)

Population (2011)
  - Total: 5,294

Languages
  - Official: Hindi
- Time zone: UTC+5:30 (IST)
- PIN: 281403
- Telephone code: 05662
- Vehicle registration: UP-85

Kharaut is a large village and a gram panchayat in Nandgaon block of Chhata Tehsil of Mathura district in Uttar Pradesh. The village is about 4 kilometres from Kosi Kalan town and 3 km for from NH19 Delhi Agra Highway nearby Kotwan Village and connect with Hasanpur Kosi Kalan Road.
