= Ganugupahad =

Ganugupahad is a small village in Jangaon district, Telangana, India, approximately 8 km from district headquarters Jangaon. Neighboring villages include Vadlakonda, Yerragollapahad, Venkiryala, and Marigadi. Village having two connectivity roads towards Maddur and Narmetta The population is approximately 2,637, with 1,700 voting members. The official language of Ganugupahad is Telugu. Ganugupahad is located at 17°47’20"N and 79°08’21" E, and is at an elevation of 425 Metres. The climate is hot and dry with May being the hottest month. The monsoon season follows the summer months and brings most of the annual rainfall.

== Government ==
The village government consists of a Sarpanch and a village officer. The Sarpanch is elected by the townspeople for a five-year term and serves as the village mayor. The village is divided into ten sections, each headed by a ward member. These ward members also help to elect the Sarpanch. The village officer is appointed by the government.

== Culture ==
Ganugupahad is a majority Hindu village, with a small percentage of Muslims and Christians. In accordance with Hindu tradition, villagers celebrate the festivals of Ekadhashi, Vinayaka Chavithi, Raksha Bandhan, Dhasara, Diwali, Ugadhi, Sankrathi, and Holi. The Hindu temple in Ganugupahad is called Sri Rajarajeswara Swamy temple and was built at the time of Kakatiya dynasty. Villagers often attend the temple to do Puja, an offering to the gods, and Bajana, ceremonial songs. The historic temple was built many centuries ago.

=== Cuisine ===
The staples of the diet are rice, lentils, and vegetable curries. Curd is also eaten at most meals. Chicken and mutton are prepared on special occasions such as festivals. Much of the food is flavored with turmeric, chili powder, cardamom, curry leaves, and coriander.

== Family life ==
It is common for multiple generations of families to live together in one house. Marriages are arranged by the individuals' families and generally take place when the woman is between 18 and 22 years old and the man is between 21 and 26 years old. Most women are housewives who clean the home, prepare meals, and take care of the children while the men earn a living for the family.

== Business and Industry ==
The majority of citizens are farmers and the main crops are Paddy and cotton. While most farmers are men, women play an important role in rice transplanting. Monsoon season, the rainy season in the late summer and early fall months, is the primary season for planting crops. Herders also play an important role in agriculture. It is their responsibility to lead the village water buffalo and goats to pasture each day. Other typical jobs include tailors, toddy tappers, carpenters, drivers, shop keepers, basket weavers, and teachers.

== Transportation ==
Walking is the primary mode of transportation, followed by bicycles, motorcycles, and autos, which are similar to taxis. Villagers typically travel on buses for longer distance trips. Cars and larger vehicles are uncommon in Ganugupahad, but more prosperous families may sometimes have them.
