= Rajesh Chaudhary =

Indian politician

Rajesh Chaudhary is an Indian politician who is serving as Member of 18th Uttar Pradesh Legislative Assembly from Mant Assembly. In 2022 Uttar Pradesh Legislative Assembly election, he won by defeating eight time MLA Shyam Sunder Sharma with 83,958 votes.
