= Malipura =

- Locality
- Location in Uttar Pradesh, India Malipura (India)
- Coordinates: 27.937°N 77.842°E
- Country: India
- State: Uttar Pradesh
- District: Aligarh
- Elevation: 188 m (617 ft)

Population (2011)
  - Total: 7,565

Language
  - Official: Hindi
  - Additional official: Urdu
- Time zone: UTC+5:30 (IST)
- PIN: 202138
- Telephone code: 05724
- Website: http://www.nppkhair.co.in/

Malipura is a locality in Khair City of Aligarh district in the Indian state of Uttar Pradesh. It is situated on Tentigaon Road and Tentigaon Bypass Road.

== Demographics ==
As of 2011 India census, Malipura had a population of 7,565. Males constitute 52% of the population and females 48%. Malipura has an average literacy rate of 52%, lower than the national average of 59.5%: male literacy is 58%, and female literacy is 42%. In Malipura, 20% of the population is under 6 years of age.

== See also ==
- Khair City, Uttar Pradesh
- List of cities in Uttar Pradesh
