= Surir =

- Town
- Surir Location in Uttar Pradesh, India Surir (India)
- Coordinates: 27.771787°N 77.720847°E
- Country: India
- District: Mathura

Population (2011)
  - Total: 9,845

Languages
  - Official: Hindi
- Time zone: UTC+5:30 (IST)
- PIN: 281205

Surir is a town located in Mant Tehsil of Mathura district in the Indian state of Uttar Pradesh. Bhidauni is a nearby village on the Yamuna river. Surir kalan is a residential place and Surir Vijau is a marketplace. Now Surir is known as Bricks Udyog as it has more than 100 bricks factories, which provide employment to thousands of workers from this area. Currently, Gram Pradhan of Surir Vijau is Mona Devi W/O Peetam Singh (Shera Thakur), elected on 3 May 2021. Surir is well connected to the big cities such as Mathura, Vrindavan, Khair, Aligarh, Agra, Noida, Palwal, Bulandshahar, Ghaziabad and Delhi. It lies on the Yamuna Expressway, connecting it to Delhi and Agra.

== Villages ==
Surir encompasses the villages of Nagla Phonda, Garhi Parsoti, Bhidauni, Auhawa Bangar, Shihavan Bangar, Kewat Nagla, Nagla Jagarupa, Sikanderpur, Bera, Jarara Bhadanwara, Bhalai, Hasanpur, Karahari, Khairakothi, Lohai, Meerpur, Nawali, Rajagarhi. Lamtori

== Politics ==
Mant (Assembly constituency) is the Vidhan Sabha constituency. Mathura (Lok Sabha constituency) is the parliamentary constituency.

== Commerce ==
Painth Vegetable Bazar is a local green vegetable market situated in the main market. The State Bank of India and Syndicate Bank serve the banking needs of Surir residents and nearby villagers. At present about 100 bricks factories are running around this town. The main market has all kind of shops for daily need of the residents of this area.

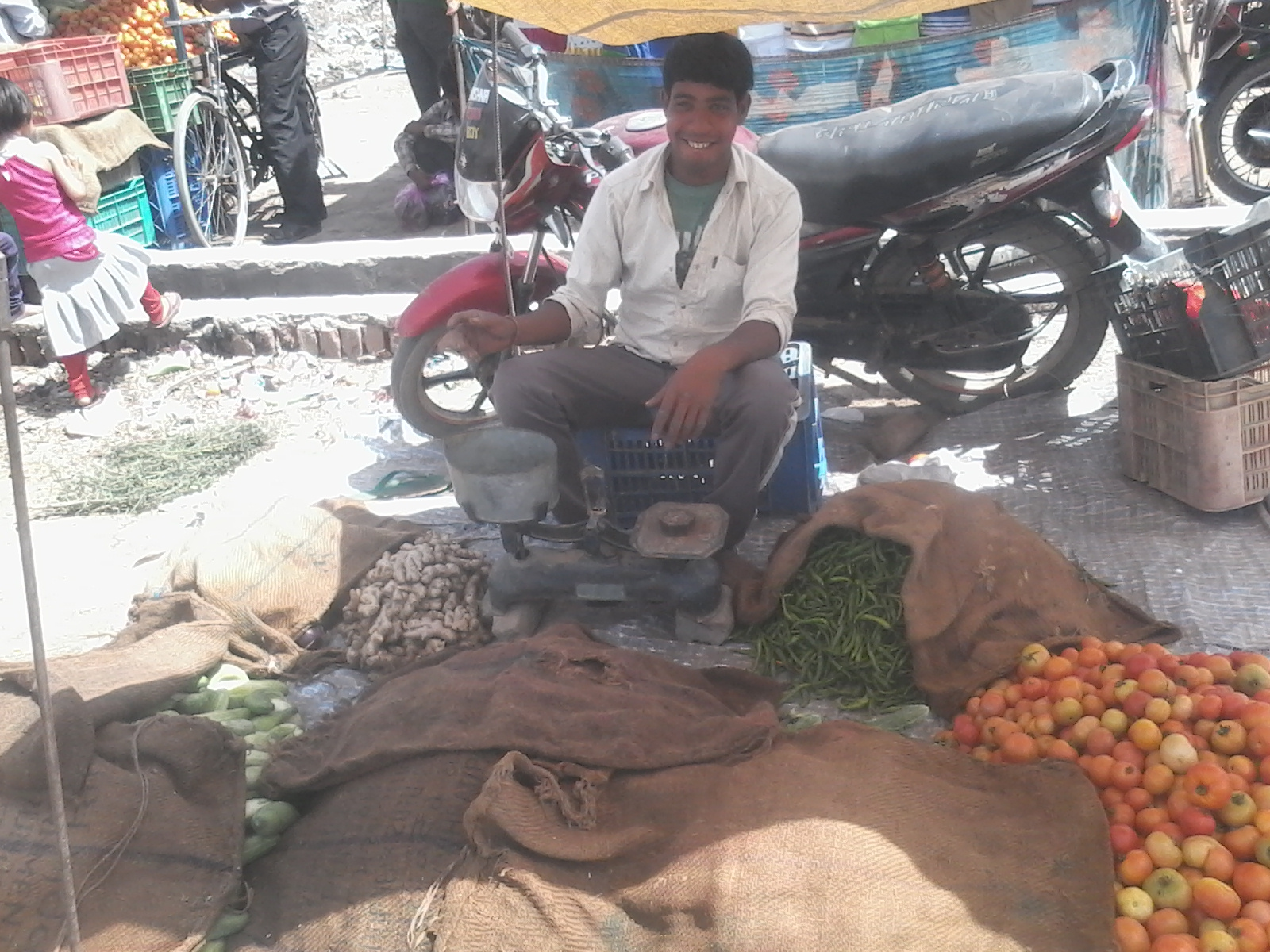
A Vegetable vendors selling geen vegetables in Painth Vegetable Bazar

== Road ==
Surir is well connected to Mathura, Khair, Mant, Aligarh and Agra by Mathura-Bajna road and well connected to Kosi kalan, Faridabad, Delhi by Shergarh-Kosi Road and to the rest of Yamuna Expressway (from Noida to Agra). At present no cut & bypass near Surir, but villagers have been demanding a cut between Surir and Tentigaon on Yamuna e-way. At present Bajana Cut open to reach Yamuna Expressway. Surir Also connected to Noida, Delhi and Agra.
