= Akbarpur, Mathura =

Akbarpur is a village situated in Mant Tehsil of Mathura district, Uttar Pradesh, India. The census code of the village is 123939. Akbarpur is administered by a gram panchayat.

Mat is the nearest town. Hernol (3 km), Surirkalan Bagar (4 km), Iroli Gujar Bangar (4 km), Pabbipur (4 km), and Sirrela (5 km) are the nearby villages to Akbarpur. Akbarpur is surrounded by Nohjhil Tehsil towards north, Vrindavan Tehsil towards south, Gonda Tehsil towards east, Chaumuha Tehsil towards west.
