= Udhar =

- Village
- Country: India
- State: Uttar Pradesh
- District: Mathura
- Vidhan Sabha: Mant (Assembly constituency)
- Lok Sabha: Mathura

Government
  - Type: Local government in India
  - Body: Gram Panchayat
- Elevation: 189 m (620 ft)

Population (2011)
  - Total: 1,648

Languages
  - Official: Hindi,
  - Local: Braj Bhasha
- Time zone: UTC+5:30 (IST)
- PIN: 281205
- Telephone code: 05663
- Vehicle registration: UP85 XXXX

Udhar is a high literacy village located in Mat tehsil in Mathura district of Uttar Pradesh, India. It is one of 267 villages in mat Block along with villages like Bindu Bulaki and Nagla Himana. There is a railway station nearby, Mathura. Mat is the nearest town to Udhar village.

== Demography ==
Udhar Village has a total population of 1,648 as per Population Census 2011.Sex ratio of Village is 419 and child sex ratio is 871. Uttar Pradesh state average for both ratios is 912 and 902 respectively.

== Politics ==
Mant (Assembly constituency) is the Vidhan Sabha constituency. Mathura (Lok Sabha constituency) is the parliamentary constituency.
