= Neemgaon =

- Village
- Location in Uttar Pradesh, India Neemgaon (India)
- Coordinates: 27.68°N 77.89°E
- Country: India
- State: Uttar Pradesh
- District: Mathura
- Elevation: 176 m (577 ft)

Population (2011)
  - Total: 4,746

Language
  - Official: Hindi
  - Additional: Braj Bhasha
- Time zone: UTC+5:30 (IST)
- PIN: 281204
- Vehicle registration: UP 85

Neemgaon is a village in the Mat Block in the Mathura district of the Indian state of Uttar Pradesh.

== Geography ==
Neemgaon is located at 27°36′N 77°49′E. It has an average elevation of 175 m (574 ft).
