= Naseeti =

Village in India

- Village
- Location in India
- Coordinates: 27°40′48″N 77°45′28″E
- Country: India
- District: Mathura District
- Subdivision: Mant Tehsil

Population (2011)
  - Total: 3,336

Naseeti is a village located in Mant Tehsil, Mathura district, Uttar Pradesh, India. As of the 2011 Census, Naseeti has 559 households and 3336 residents.
