= Shankar Garhi =

Coordinates: 22°55′03″N 77°42′19″E

Shankargarhi शंकरगढ़ी
- Village
- Location in Uttar Pradesh, India
- Country: India
- State: Uttar Pradesh
- Division: Agra
- District: Mathura
- Sub-district: Mat

Population (2011)
  - Total: 1,427
- Time zone: UTC+5:30 (Indian Standard Time (IST))
- PIN code: 281201

Shankargarhi is a village located near Bajna in the district of Mathura, Uttar Pradesh, India.
