= Jatpura =

Village in Moradabad district, Uttar Pradesh, India

Jatpura is a small village located in Dilari block in the district of Moradabad in the state of Uttar Pradesh in India.
