= Jarkhi =

- Village
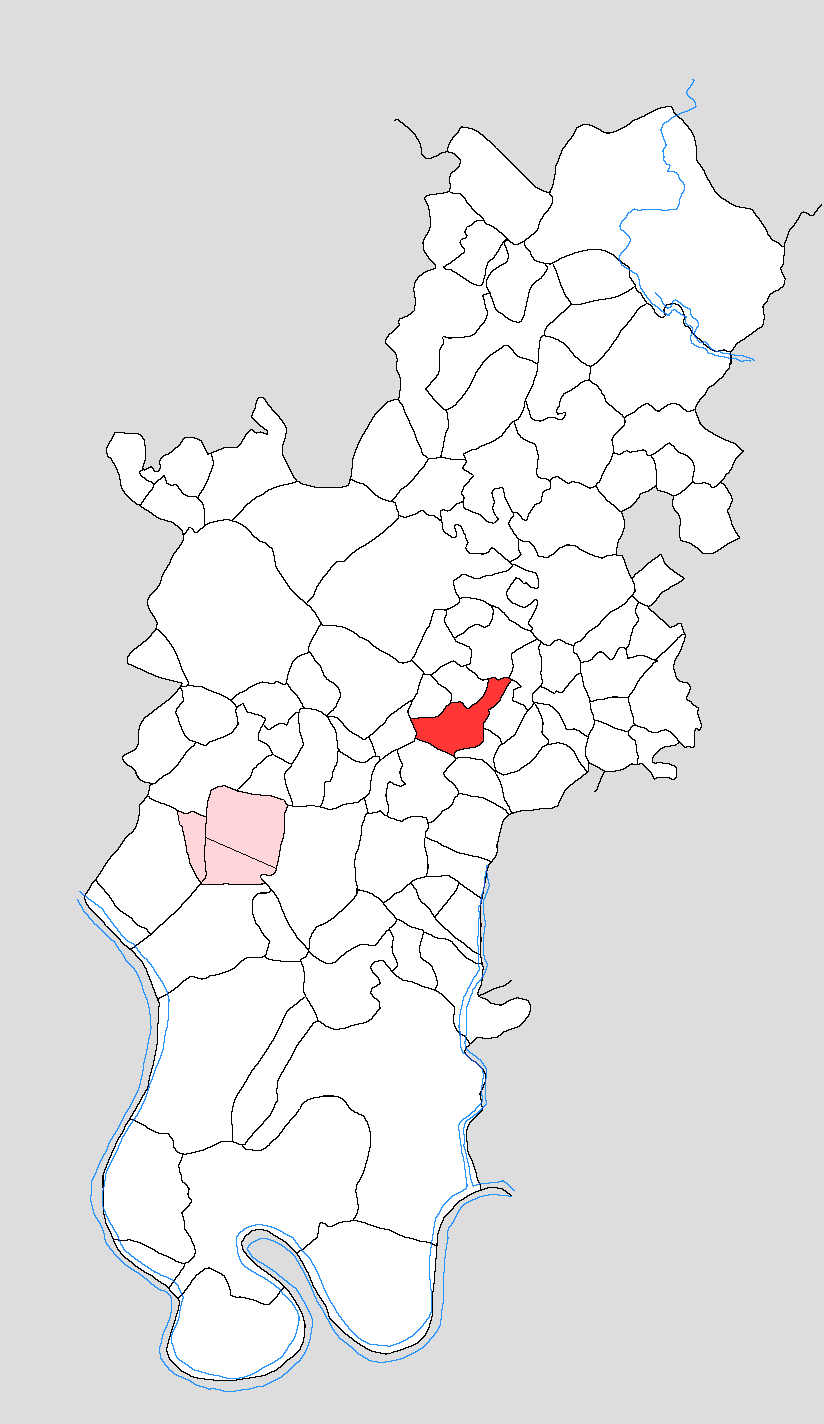
- Map showing Jarkhi in Tundla block

- Location in Uttar Pradesh, India
- Coordinates: 27.24222°N 78.29811°E
- Country: India
- State: Uttar Pradesh
- District: Firozabad
- Tehsil: Tundla

Area
  - Total: 2.518 km^{2} (0.972 sq mi)

Population (2011)
  - Total: 1,468
  - Density: 583.0/km^{2} (1,510/sq mi)
- Time zone: UTC+5:30 (IST)

Jarkhi (Jārkhī) is a village in Tundla block of Firozabad district, Uttar Pradesh. As of 2011, it has a population of 1,468, in 262 households. Jarkhi was historically the capital of a taluqdari estate held by a Jat family and comprising 41 villages. It was also known for its prosperous Jain community and its export trade in shoes and ghee.

== Geography ==
Jarkhi is located about 6.5 km northeast from Tundla, the tehsil headquarters. The Jhirna, a small rain-fed stream that historically marked the boundary between Itimadpur and Firozabad tehsils, flows past Jarkhi.

== History ==
Jarkhi was historically the seat of a large taluqdari estate, which originated in 1803 with a lease of 41 villages granted to two Jats named Sundar and Dalip Singh. (Or, according to another version, to a Jat moneylender from Mahaban named Dheri Singh; in the first version, he is described as Dalip Singh's grandson.) Previously, Jarkhi had been held by a different group of Jats. Dheri Singh and his descendants later fell into debt and had to sell or mortgage much of their property to biswadars or sub-proprietors. They later settled with the biswadars and bought back proprietorship, and at the turn of the 20th century there were several branches of the family who held a combined total of 56 villages. The main family residence in Jarkhi at that point consisted of a group of masonry buildings surrounded by an earth wall and a deep ditch.

Jarkhi at the turn of the 20th century was described as a busy market village that held markets twice per week. Shoes were manufactured here and many were exported for sale in Calcutta (now Kolkata), and there was also a large export of ghee to Firozabad and Shikohabad. Fruit was also exported to Agra when in season. The village also had an upper primary school, a post office, and a stud farm. As of 1901, Jarkhi's population was 1,362, including a significant minority of 321 Jains. Jarkhi's Jain community was wealthy and prosperous and had built "a fine temple" in the village.

== Demographics ==
As of 2011, Jarkhi had a population of 1,468, in 262 households. This population was 54.4% male (798) and 45.6% female (670). The 0-6 age group numbered 207 (104 male and 103 female), making up 14.1% of the total population. 360 residents were members of Scheduled Castes, or 24.5% of the total.

The 1981 census recorded Jarkhi as having a population of 1,022 people (565 male and 457 female), in 177 households and 165 physical houses.

The 1961 census recorded Jarkhi (as "Jakhi") as comprising 1 hamlet, with a total population of 951 people (521 male and 430 female), in 140 households and 137 physical houses. The area of the village was given as 625 acres and it had a post office and medical practitioner at the time.

== Infrastructure ==
As of 2011, Jarkhi had 1 primary school and 1 medical clinic. Drinking water was provided by hand pump and tube well/borehole; there were no public toilets. The village had a sub post office but no public library; there was at least some access to electricity for all purposes. Streets were made of both kachcha and pakka materials.
