= Rashtriya Inter College Surir =

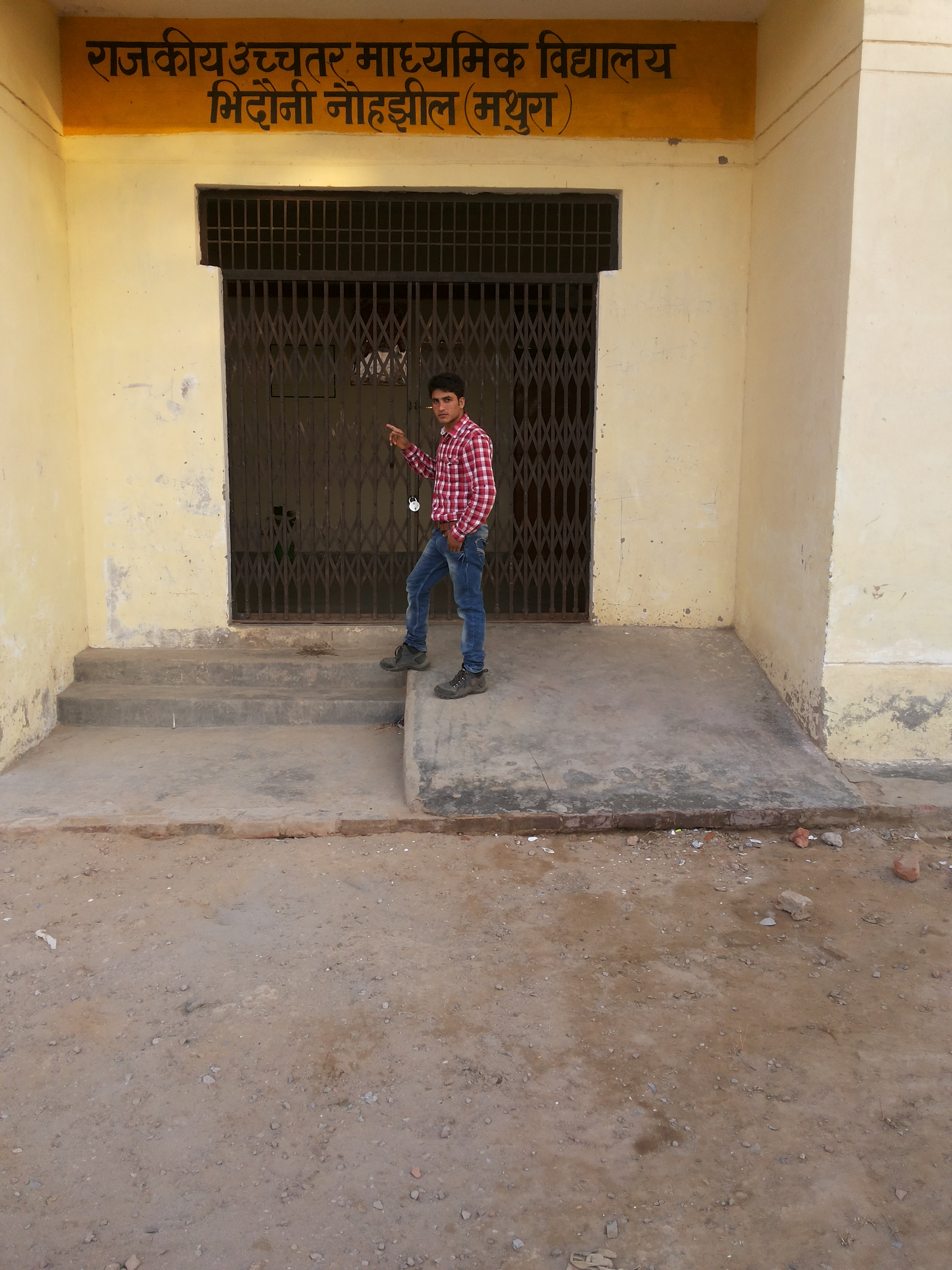

Location
- Surir; Mathura, India, Uttar Pradesh, 281205; 27°46′N 77°43′E

Information
- Type: Public, co-educational
- Established: 2004
- Principal: Shivaji शिवाजी
- Grades: 06-12
- Enrollment: 14806
- Language: Hindi/ English
- Classrooms: 34
- Campus: Rural, 1.809 acres
- Campus type: Rural
- Nickname: RIC
- Affiliation: UPMSP
- Website: www.upmspboard.com

Rashtriya Inter College is a Hr. Secondary School established in 1995 and located in Surir on Raya – Bajna Road (Next to Surir Police Station), Nohjheel block of Mathura district in Uttar Pradesh state of India. School is approved for Upper Primary, Secondary, Senior Secondary and working under the management of Pvt. Aided Organisation.

Primary medium of instruction in RIC is Hindi language and schools is co-educational i.e. both boys and girls are allowed to take admission equally manner.
