= Badanpur, Mathura =

Coordinates: 27.792°N 77.774°E

Badanpur is a panchayat village in Mathura district of Uttar Pradesh, India. It is located in the Naujhil block of the Mant Tehsil.

== Politics ==
Mant (Assembly constituency) is the Vidhan Sabha constituency. Mathura (Lok Sabha constituency) is the parliamentary constituency.
