= Surja =

- Village
- Location in Punjab, India Surja (India)
- Coordinates: 31.1261594°N 75.7361085°E
- Country: India
- State: Punjab
- District: Jalandhar

Government
  - Type: Panchayat raj
  - Body: Gram panchayat
- Elevation: 240 m (790 ft)

Population (2011)
  - Total: 690
- Sex ratio 536/354 ♂/♀

Languages
  - Official: Punjabi
- Time zone: UTC+5:30 (IST)
- PIN: 144409
- ISO 3166 code: IN-PB
- Website: jalandhar.nic.in

Surja is a village in Jalandhar district of Punjab State, India. It is located 3.8 km (2 miles) from Goraya, 16.9 km from Phillaur, 36.9 km (22.9 mi) from district headquarter Jalandhar and 136 km (85 mi) from state capital Chandigarh. The village is administrated by Sarpanch, as an elected representative of the village.

== Transport ==
Goraya railway station is the nearest train station. However, Phagwara Junction train station is 14.3 kilometres (8.9 mi) away from the village. The village is 44.2 km (27.5 mi) from the domestic airport in Ludhiana, and the nearest international airport is located in Chandigarh. Also, Sri Guru Ram Dass Jee International Airport is the second-nearest airport, which is 131 km (81 mi) away in Amritsar.
