= Mahaban =

- Town
- Location in Uttar Pradesh, India Mahaban (India)
- Coordinates: 27.43°N 77.75°E
- Country: India
- State: Uttar Pradesh
- District: Mathura
- Elevation: 176 m (577 ft)

Population (2001)
  - Total: 8,608

Languages
  - Official: Hindi
  - Native: Braj Bhasha dialect
- Time zone: UTC+5:30 (IST)

Mahaban is a town and a nagar panchayat in Mathura district in the Indian state of Uttar Pradesh.

== History ==
Mahaban was sacked by Mahmud of Ghazni in 1017 CE. During this invasion, the prince of Mahaban Kulchand killed himself and his family not to killed himself by the hand of Mahmud Ghaznavi. After that their sons goes to east and capture land from kirars, till today their descendants are lived in kursanda or baltikari and unchagaao or in 110 villages of hatharas and Mathura, till today they are also known as haga chaudhary/ agha chaudhary from there the invading forces moved to Mathura. Later it was also invaded by Iltutmish, Shah Jahan and Ahmed Shah Abdali.

Facial structure of haga jats

Mahaban remained a pargana of Agra Subah during the Mughal rule. It became the hotspot of rebellions during reign of Emperor Shahjahan and Aurangzeb. During the later half of 17th century Mahaban along with Sadabad, Nauh, Jalesar and Khandoli parganas was occupied by the Jats under rebel chief Nandram Thenua of Jawar. Mahaban later became part of Kingdom of Mursan under Raja Bahadur Puhup Singh. During 18th century it formed part of Bharatpur Kingdom. After the fall of Bharatpur it was occupied by Raja Dayaram of Hathras. After the Siege of Hathras(1818 ), British forces took possession of Mahaban and made it part of Mathura district. During the revolt of 1857, the Jats of Mahaban revolted against the British Empire.

== Geography ==
Mahaban is located at 27.43°N 77.75°E. It has an average elevation of 176 metres (577 feet).

== Demographics ==
As of 2001 India census, Mahaban has a population of 8,608. Males constitute 54% of the population and females 46%. Mahaban has an average literacy rate of 39%, lower than the national average of 59.5%: male literacy is 51%, and female literacy is 25%. In Mahaban, 20% of the population is under 6 years of age.
