= Badanpur, Magura =

Coordinates: 23.6645°N 89.3904°E

Badanpur is a village in Magura District of Khulna Division, Bangladesh.
