= Bakla, Uttar Pradesh =

Bakla is a village in Mant Tehsil of Mathura district, Uttar Pradesh, India.

As in the Constitution of India and the Panchyati Raaj Act, Bakla village is administered by a Gram Pradhan (Head of Village) who is the elected representative of village. The current Gram Pradhan as of 2021 is Shri Vijay Kumar Singh S/O Shri Rajvir Singh
