= Shyam Sunder Sharma =

Indian politician

Member of the Uttar Pradesh Legislative Assembly
- In office June 2017 – March 2022
- Preceded by: Jayant Chaudhary
- Constituency: Mant
- In office November 1989 – March 2012
- Succeeded by: Jayant Chaudhary
- Constituency: Mant

Personal details
- Born: 15 July 1952 (age 74) Mathura, Uttar Pradesh, India
- Party: Indian National Congress
- Other political affiliations: Akhil Bhartiya Loktantrik Congress, All India Trinamool Congress, Bahujan Samaj Party
- Spouse: Sudha Sharma (wife)
- Children: 1 son & 2 daughters
- Parent: Lokmani Sharma (father)
- Education: Dr. Bhimrao Ambedkar University
- Profession: Farmer & politician

Shyam Sunder Sharma is an Indian politician and a member of the 16th Legislative Assembly of India. He represented the Mant constituency of Uttar Pradesh and is a member of the Indian National Congress political party.

== Early life and education ==
Shyam Sunder Sharma was born in the Mathura district. He attended Dr. Bhimrao Ambedkar University and attained a Master of Arts degree.

== Political career ==
Shyam Sunder Sharma has been a MLA for eight straight terms. He represented the Mant constituency and is a member of the All India Trinamool Congress political party. Sharma has been a member of Akhil Bhartiya Loktantrik Congress, All India Indira Congress (Tiwari) and Indian National Congress political parties in the past.

On 4 January 2016, Sharma, his son, and seven others were charged with forgery and fraud. The group stole at least Rs26.0 million.

== Posts held ==
#	From	To	Position	Comments
01	2022		2nd position	Lost to BJP's Rajesh Chaudhary
02	2017	2022	Member, 17th Legislative Assembly	
03	2012	2017	Member, 16th Legislative Assembly	Elected during the by-election in 12 Jun. Joined All India Trinamool Congress, UP core committee
04	2007	2012	Member, 15th Legislative Assembly	
05	2002	2007	Member, 14th Legislative Assembly	
06	1996	2002	Member, 13th Legislative Assembly	
07	1993	1995	Member, 12th Legislative Assembly	
08	1991	1992	Member, 11th Legislative Assembly	
09	1989	1991	Member, 10th Legislative Assembly	

== See also ==
- Mant (Assembly constituency)
- Sixteenth Legislative Assembly of Uttar Pradesh
- Uttar Pradesh Legislative Assembly
