= Shihavan Bangar =

Coordinates: 27°47′09″N 77°41′41″E

Shihavan Bangar is a small village on the right (north) bank of the Yamuna River in Mat Tehsil, Mathura District, Uttar Pradesh, India. It is across the river from Kewat Nagla.

== Politics ==
Mant (Assembly constituency) is the Vidhan Sabha constituency. Mathura (Lok Sabha constituency) is the parliamentary constituency.
