= Bajna, Pakistan =

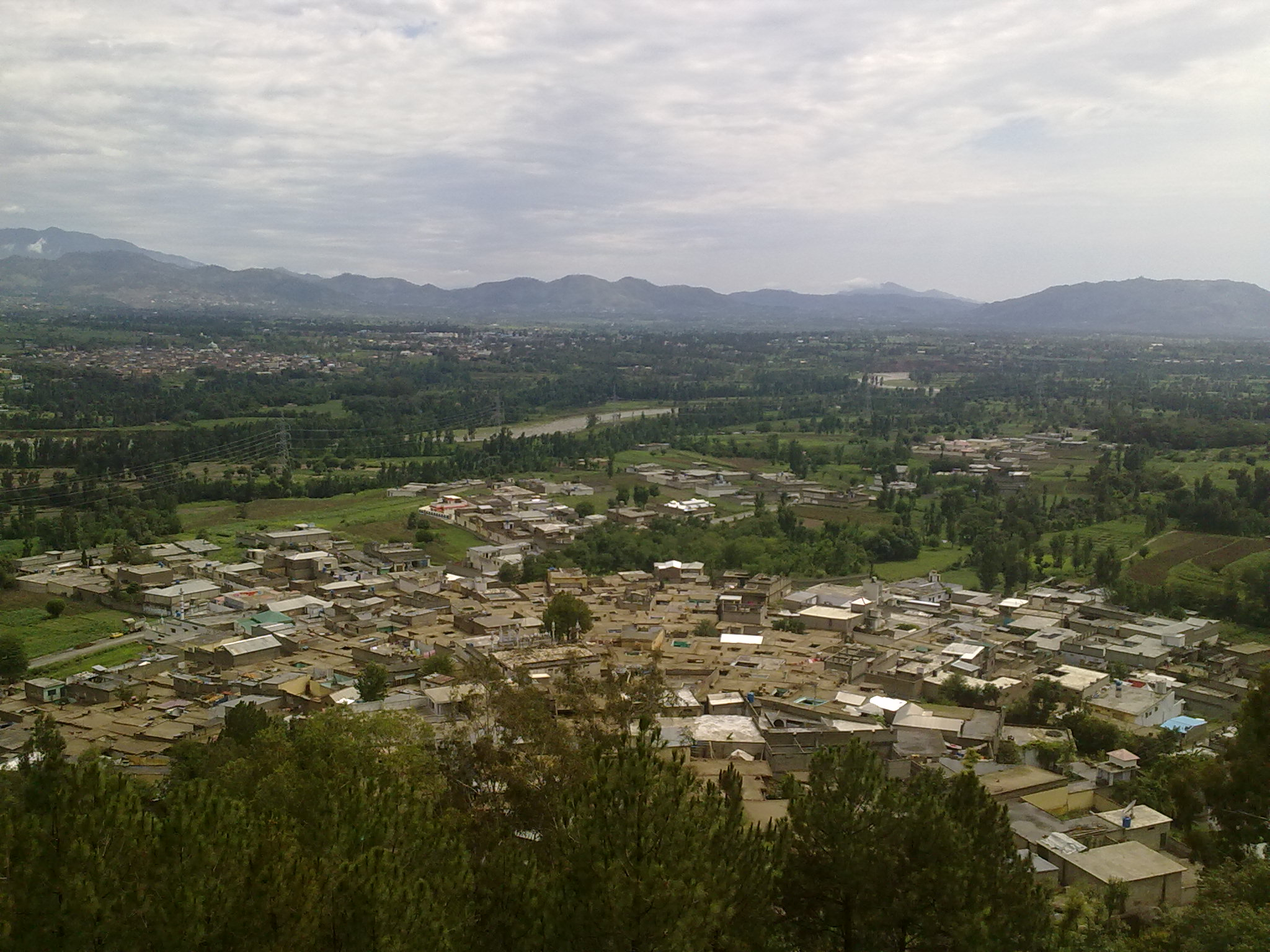
- Bajna

- Location within Pakistan
- Coordinates: 34.27°N 73.15°E
- Country: Pakistan
- Province: Khyber Pakhtunkhwa
- Elevation: 934 m (3,064 ft)
- Time zone: UTC+5 (PST)

Bajna is a small village located in Mansehra District, in Khyber Pakhtunkhwa, Pakistan. It is at an elevation of 934 meters.
