= Ben Amera =

Monolith in Mauritania

Coordinates: 21°14′0″N 13°40′0″W

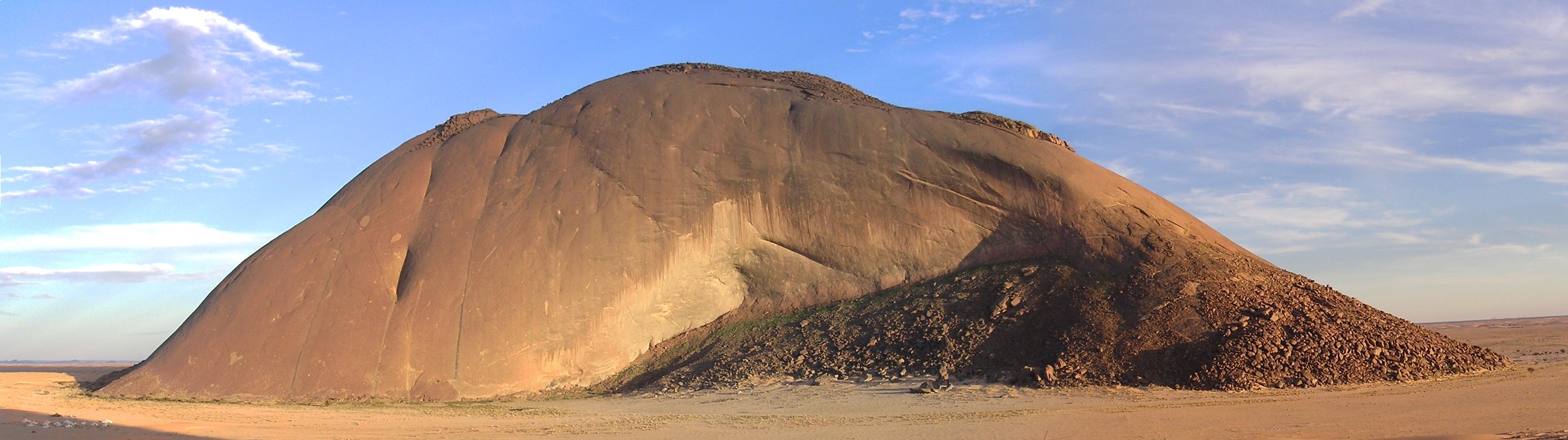
Monolith of Ben Amera

Ben Amera (or Amira; Arabic: بن عميرة) is Africa's largest monolith, rising 633 metres (2,077 ft) above the desert floor. It is the world's second-largest monolith, after only Uluru in Australia. Ben Amera is located in Mauritania, near the border with Western Sahara. It lies 4 kilometres (2.5 mi) north of the train track where the famous Iron Ore Train travels between Nouâdibhou and Choûm.

Nearby, a lesser monolith, Aïsha, lies a 20-minute drive to the west of Ben Amera. In 1999, a dozen artists of international fame celebrated the millennium by carving into the boulders at the base of Aïsha.

A 4x4 vehicle and an experienced desert driver is required to handle the deep, sandy track out to Ben Amera, as there is no paving after leaving the road that runs from Atar to Zouerrat. Drivers can be hired in Atar. The rough path runs parallel to the tracks for the Iron Ore Train before crossing it at the 395 kilometres (245 mi) mark. As of December 2018, there was a small encampment near the tracks and a security checkpoint. Whereas at one point in time fiches were required for foreign travelers at these types of checkpoints, now a simple photocopy of the traveler's passport usually suffices.

== Geological monoliths of Africa ==
- Brandberg Mountain, Namibia
- Aso Rock, Nigeria
- Zuma Rock, Nigeria
