= Sikanderpur, Mathura =

Village in Uttar Pradesh, India

Sikanderpur is a small village in Mat tehsil in Mathura District.
