= Dilari =

- city
- Location within Uttar Pradesh Location within India
- Coordinates: 29.043°N 78.750°E
- Country: India
- State: Uttar Pradesh
- District: Moradabad

Government
  - MP: ST Hasan
- Elevation: 210 m (690 ft)

Population (2001)
  - Total: 9,984

Languages
  - Official: Hindi
- Time zone: UTC+5:30 (IST)
- PIN: 244401
- Telephone code: 0591
- Vehicle registration: UP 21
- Sex ratio: 1.20 ♂/♀

Dilari is a village in Moradabad district and subdistrict in the Indian state of Uttar Pradesh. It is about 18 km from Moradabad. Dilari is famous for its production and manufacturing of sugar cane and peppermint oil (Mentha oil).It is also famous for the production of Mango, Wheat and Rice.This village have roots in history since 1734. There are many documents to prove that Dilari was settled in 1734 by Thakur Bhagwant Singh (king of "Medu" clan near Hathras).

== Demographics ==
As of the 2001 census, Dilari had a population of 9984. Males constitute 53% of population whereas females 47%. Dilari has an average literacy rate of 74%, higher than national average literacy rate of 59.5%; male literacy is 82% and female literacy is 66%. In Dilari 15% of population is under 6 years of age. As there are many educational centres in the city, the literacy has been constantly increasing. The languages spoken are Hindi, Urdu, Punjabi, English.

King Of Thakur Manvendra singh so Purushottam Singh

== Education ==
- Saraswati Shishu Mandir Dilari
- Saraswati Vidya Mandir Inter College Govindpur Dilari
- Sarvodaya Inter College Dilari
- Amardeep Navjyoti JHS Dilari
- Shri Sai Public School Govindpur Dilari
- KD education public school Dilari
