= Bəklə =

- Municipality
- Location within Azerbaijan
- Coordinates: 40°36′45″N 48°54′07″E
- Country: Azerbaijan
- Rayon: Gobustan

Population
  - Total: 280
- Time zone: UTC+4 (AZT)
  - Summer (DST): UTC+5 (AZT)

Bəklə (also, Bekle and Beklya) is a village and municipality in the Gobustan Rayon of Azerbaijan. It has a population of 280.
