= Chhata tehsil =

Tehsil in Mathura, Uttar Pradesh, India

Chhata Tehsil
- Tehsil
- Mat Tehsil Location in Uttar Pradesh, India
- Coordinates: 27.723916°N 77.502880°E
- Country: India
- State: Uttar Pradesh
- Elevation: 189 m (620 ft)

Population (2011)
  - Total: 19,836

Languages
  - Official: Hindi, English
- Time zone: UTC+5:30 (IST)
- Postal code: 281401
- Telephone code: 05662
- Vehicle registration: UP85 XXXX
- Sub-district code: 09140002
- Website: Tehsil Divas Official Website

Chhata is a tehsil in Mathura district of Uttar Pradesh state, India. Its headquarters is Chhata town. It is part of Agra division. It is located 35 km north of the District headquarters Mathura, and 413 km east of the state capital Lucknow.

== List of towns and villages ==
Village Name	Population	Administrative Division
Adampur	1,137	Chhata
Agaryala	5,688	Chhata
Ahuri	1,190	Chhata
Bishambhara	8,114	Chhata
