= Badanpur, Narwana =

Badanpur is a panchayat village in Jind district of Haryana, India. It is located in the Narwana block of the Narwana tehsil. Its postal code is 126152.

The village is spread over an area of 1,401 hectares (3,460 acres).

== Demographics ==
=== Population ===
According to the 2011 Census of India the village had a population of 5,482. With the male population of 2,940 and 2,542 females.
