= Kotwan =

- Village
- Location in Uttar Pradesh, India Kotwan (India)
- Coordinates: 27.82°N 77.42°E
- Country: India
- State: Uttar Pradesh
- District: Mathura
- Elevation: 189 m (620 ft)

Population (2011)
  - Total: 5,193

Languages
  - Official: Hindi
- Time zone: UTC+5:30 (IST)
- PIN: 281403
- Telephone code: 05662
- Vehicle registration: UP-85

Kotwan is a village in the Mathura district of Uttar Pradesh, India. It is the site where according to Hinduism, Krishna spent his childhood and is one of the main places in the Braj Bhoomi region. The Village is about 100 km away from Agra.

Kotwan Village is the Saadhna Sthali, Shri Brijbhushan Mandir of Shri Madhav, and Das Ji Maharaj, or Mauni Baba Ji

== Geography ==
Kotwan is located at 27.82578745°N 77.42016748312331°E, in the Mathura District of Uttar Pradesh, India. It belongs to Agra Division. It is located 55 km towards North from District headquarters Mathura, 20 km from Nandgaon, and 429 km from state capital Lucknow.

Nabipur (3 km), Hatana (4 km), Lalpur (5 km ), Kharauth (5 km), Bathain Khurd (6 km) are the nearby villages to Kotwan. Kotwan is surrounded by Chhata Block towards East, Hodal Block towards North, Hassanpur Block towards North, and Punahana Block towards west.

Hodal, Palwal, Kosi Kalan, Vrindavan, Mathura are the cities nearby Kotwan.

Kotwan is located at the border of the Mathura District and Bharatpur District. Bharatpur District- Kaman is located to the west of it. It is near to the Haryana-UP Border.

== Demographics ==
=== Kotwan 2011 Census Details ===
Kotwan Local Language is Hindi. Kotwan Village Total population is 5193 and number of houses are 802. Female Population is 47.2%. Village literacy rate is 58.0% and the Female Literacy rate is 21.8%.

=== Population ===
Census Parameter	Census Data
Total Population	5193
Total no. Of Houses	802
Female Population %	47.2% (2452)
Total Literacy Rate %	58% (3013)
Female Literacy rate %,	21.8% (1134)
Schedule Tribes Population %	0.0% (00)
Schedule Cast Population %	19.6% (1019)
Working Population %	24.5%
Child (0-6) Population	790
Girl Child (0-6) Population %	44.4% (351)

== Religious heritage ==
Kotwan is considered to be a holy place for Vaisnavism tradition of Hinduism. It is a related to worship of Braj and the area includes places like Sheetal Kund that are associated with Krishna. Millions of devotees of Radha Krishna visit these places of pilgrimage every year and participate in a number of festivals. The center of Krishna-worship has been for a long time Brajbhumi, the district of Mathura that embraces also Vrindavana, Govardhana, and Gokula, associated with Krishna from the time immemorial. Many millions of Krishna bhaktas visit these places every year and participate in the numerous festivals that re-enact divine scenes from Krishna's life on Earth, of which were spent in those very places.

== Transportation ==
=== Road ===
Kotwan is well connected by roads and is connected to Delhi by National Highway (NH) 19

=== Rail ===
- Kosi Kalan Rail Station is on the Old G.T. Road Kosi Kalan.
- Hodal Rail Station is on the Agra-Delhi Road.
