= Kewat Nagla =

- Village
- Kewat Nagla Location in Uttar Pradesh, India Kewat Nagla (India)
- Coordinates: 27°46′35″N 77°41′09″E
- Country: India
- State: Uttar Pradesh
- District: Mathura
- Tehsil: Mat
- Gram panchayat: Bhidauni
- Elevation: 185 m (607 ft)

Languages
  - Official: Hindi, English,
- Time zone: UTC+5:30 (IST)
- PIN: 281205
- Telephone code: 05663
- Vehicle registration: UP85 XXXX

Kewat Nagla is a very small village (basti) of Mallaah (boatmen), under the jurisdiction of Bhidauni gram panchayat, in Mat Tehsil, Mathura District, Uttar Pradesh, India. Village officially known as Nagla Nahariya is located beside the Yamuna River, northwest of its gram panchayat village of Bhidauni and across the river from the village of Shihavan.

== Politics ==
Mant (Assembly constituency) is the Vidhan Sabha constituency. Mathura (Lok Sabha constituency) is the parliamentary constituency.
