= Bera, Mathura =

Bera
- Village
- Interactive map of Bera
- Country: India
- State: Uttar Pradesh

Government
  - Type: Gram Panchayat
- Website: up.gov.in

Bera or Badrivan Dham is a village or gram panchayat in Nauhjhil Block, Mat Tehsil of Mathura district, Uttar Pradesh, India. It situated on Khair-Tentigaon Road. Bera village is about 50 kilometres from Mathura and 17 kilometres from Khair.

== Language ==
The languages spoken in Bera are Hindi and Braj Bhasa.

== Politics ==
Mant (Assembly constituency) is the Vidhan Sabha constituency. Mathura (Lok Sabha constituency) is the parliamentary constituency.

== Geography ==
Bera is located at 27.5°N 77.68°E. It has an average elevation of 174 metres (570 feet). Khayara, Chandpur, Mahmudgarhi, Murkati, Badanpur, Lohai, Jarara, Tehra, Jaraara, Jagpura and Sikandarpur are some of the villages that are in proximity.
