= Bajana =

Bajna
- village
- Bajna
- Location in Madhya Pradesh, India Bajna (India)
- Coordinates: 24°25′33″N 79°21′41″E
- Country: India
- State: Madhya Pradesh
- District: Chhatarpur

Government
  - Type: Gram panchayat bajna chhatarpur madhya pradesh
  - Body: Gram panchayat janpad buxwaha

Population (2011)
  - Total: 7,000

Languages
  - Official: Hindi
- Time zone: UTC+5:30 (IST)
- 471311 Bajna B. O.: 471311
- ISO 3166 code: IN-MP
- Vehicle registration: MP-
- Coastline: 0 kilometres (0 mi)

Bajana is a village in Tehsil Buxwaha in Chhatarpur district of Madhya Pradesh, India.
