= Nauhjheel =

Town in Uttar Pradesh, India

Nauhjheel is a town and block in Mathura district, Agra division, Uttar Pradesh, India. The block includes many villages. Nauhjheel is situated 48 kilometres from the city of Mathura, 31 km from Vrindavan City and 110 km from Delhi. It is near the Yamuna Expressway.

Shree Jhari Hanuman Temple is a famous ancient temple here.

It is an ancient belief that there were nine lakes here, hence the name of this village was Naujheel.
