= Raya, Uttar Pradesh =

Raya
- Town
- Location in Uttar Pradesh, India Raya (India)
- Coordinates: 27°34′N 77°47′E
- Country: India
- State: Uttar Pradesh
- District: Mathura
- Elevation: 175 m (574 ft)

Population (2011)
  - Total: 21,344

Language
  - Official: Hindi
  - Additional: Urdu
  - Additional: Braj Bhasha
- Time zone: UTC+5:30 (IST)
- PIN: 281204
- Vehicle registration: UP 85
- Website: www.nagarpanchayatraya.in

Raya is a town and a nagar panchayat in the Mathura district of the Indian state of Uttar Pradesh.

== Geography ==
Raya is located at 27°34′N 77°47′E. It has an average elevation of 175 m (574 ft).

== Demographics ==
As of 2011 Indian Census, Raya Nagar Panchayat had a total population of 21,344, of which 11,202 were males and 10,142 were females. Population within the age group of 0 to 6 years was 2,990. The total number of literates in Raya was 13,551, which constituted 63.5% of the population with male literacy of 69.5% and female literacy of 56.8%. The effective literacy rate of 7+ population of Raya was 73.8%, of which male literacy rate was 80.9% and female literacy rate was 66.0%. The Scheduled Castes population was 1,624. Raya had 3325 households in 2011.

As of the 2001 Census of India, Raya had a population of 17,990. Males constitute 53% of the population and females 47%. Raya has an average literacy rate of 54%, lower than the national average of 59.5%: male literacy is 61%, and female literacy is 47%. In Raya, 17% of the population is under 6 years of age.
