= Bajna, India =

Bajna
- Town
- Location in Uttar Pradesh, India Bajna (India)
- Coordinates: 27.898°N 77.678°E
- Country: India
- State: Uttar Pradesh
- District: Mathura
- Elevation: 183 m (600 ft)

Population (2001)
  - Total: 8,991

Languages
  - Official: Hindi
  - Native: Braj Bhasha dialect
- Time zone: UTC+5:30 (IST)
- Postal code: 281201
- Vehicle registration: UP
- Website: up.gov.in

Bajna is a town and a nagar panchayat in Mathura district in the state of Uttar Pradesh, India.

== Geography ==
Bajna has an average elevation of 183 metres (600 feet). Bajna Nagar Panchayat has total administration over 1,343 houses to which it supplies basic amenities like water and sewerage. It is also authorized to build roads within Nagar Panchayat limits and impose taxes on properties coming under its jurisdiction.

== Demographics ==
As of the 2001 Census of India, Bajna had a population of 7031. Males constitute 54% of the population and females 46%. Bajna has an average literacy rate of 58%, lower than the national average of 59.5%; with 65% of the males and 35% of females literate. 18% of the population is under 6 years of age.

=== Education ===
There are two government run inter colleges, the Brijhitkari Inter College, and the Bajna (morki) Inter College. Brijhitkari Inter College is within the town whilst Bajna Inter College is on the outskirts, nearly 2 km away from main town. There are several private schools providing English medium education, notable ones include CLA Public School and Arcadian Public School.

== Nearby cities ==
- Aligarh
- Khair
- Mathura
- Noida

== Nearby villages ==
Jaralia, Bera, Jarara, Sakatpur, Parsouli, Lalpur, Saddikpur, Jatpura (Khyaliram Chaudhary) Nayabas, Chandpur, Aandhre ki Ghari, Noserpur, Managhari, Aajnoth, Bhoot Garhi, Chinta Garhi, Edal Garhi, Hamadpur, Badoth, Inayatpur, Manpur, Chindoli, Bhartiyaka, Jatpura, Mittholi, Mudiliya, Khanpur, Katailiya, Kaulahar.
