= Mant Assembly constituency =

Constituency of the Uttar Pradesh legislative assembly in India

Mant
- Constituency No. 82 for the Uttar Pradesh Legislative Assembly

Constituency details
- Country: India
- Region: North India
- State: Uttar Pradesh
- District: Mathura
- Total electors: 3,28,948 (2019)
- Reservation: None

Member of Legislative Assembly
- 18th Uttar Pradesh Legislative Assembly
- Incumbent Rajesh Chaudhary
- Party: Bharatiya Janata Party
- Elected year: 2022

Mant Assembly constituency is one of the 403 constituencies of the Uttar Pradesh Legislative Assembly, India. It is a part of the Mathura district and one of the five assembly constituencies in the Mathura Lok Sabha constituency. First election in this assembly constituency was held in 2012 after the "Delimitation of Parliamentary and Assembly Constituencies Order, 2008" was passed and the constituency was formed in 2008. The constituency is assigned identification number 82.

== Wards / Areas ==
Extent of Mant Assembly constituency is PCs Falain-II, Jatawari, Barha, Husaini, Rampur of Paigaon KC, PCs Ujhani, Shergarh, Peerpur, Dhimri, Ranhera, Senwa, Astadi & Gulalpur of Chhata KC of Chhata Tehsil; KCs Nauhjhil, Surir, Bhidauni, Akabarpur, Harnaul, Mant & Bajana NP of Mant Tehsil.

== Members of the Legislative Assembly ==
Year	Member	Party
1962	Radhey Shyam	Socialist Party
1967	Laxmi Raman Acharya	Indian National Congress
1969	Laxmi Raman Acharya	Indian National Congress
1974	Chandan Singh	Bharatiya Kranti Dal
1977	Radhey Shyam	Janata Party
1980	Lok Mani	Indian National Congress (I)
1985	Kushal Pal Singh	Lokdal
1989	Shyam Sunder Sharma	Indian National Congress
1991	Shyam Sunder Sharma	Indian National Congress
1993	Shyam Sunder Sharma	Indian National Congress
1996	Shyam Sunder Sharma	All India Indira Congress (T)
2002	Shyam Sunder Sharma	Loktantrik Congress
2007	Shyam Sunder Sharma	Loktantrik Congress
2012	Jayant Chaudhary	Rashtriya Lok Dal
2012^	Shyam Sunder Sharma	Trinamool Congress
2017	Shyam Sunder Sharma	Bahujan Samaj Party
2022	Rajesh Chaudhary	Bharatiya Janata Party

== Election results ==
=== 2027 ===
2027 Uttar Pradesh Legislative Assembly election: Mant
Party	Candidate	Votes	%	±%
INC	Shyam Sunder Sharma			
NDA				
BSP				
NOTA	None of the above			
Majority				
Turnout				
gain from		Swing		

=== 2022 ===
2022 Uttar Pradesh Legislative Assembly election: Mant
Party	Candidate	Votes	%	±%
BJP	Rajesh Chaudhary	83,958	37.35	▲8.92
BSP	Shyam Sunder Sharma	74,378	33.09	▲1.82
SP	Sanjay Lathar	60,585	26.95	
NOTA	None of the above	1,180	0.52	▼0.08
Majority		9,580	4.26	▲4.06
Turnout		224,786	64.89	▼1.65
BJP gain from BSP		Swing		

=== 2017 ===
2017 Uttar Pradesh Legislative Assembly Election: Mant
Party	Candidate	Votes	%	±%
BSP	Shyam Sunder Sharma	65,862	31.27	
RLD	Yogesh Choudhary	65,430	31.07	
BJP	Satish Kumar Sharma	59,871	28.43	
INC	Jagdish Singh	13,270	6.3	
Independent	Lalit Kumar	2,203	1.05	
NOTA	None of the above	1,253	0.6	
Majority		432	0.2	
Turnout		210,597	66.54	

=== 2012 ===
2012 General Elections: Mant
Party	Candidate	Votes	%	±%
RLD	Jayant Chaudhary	87,062	43.11	−
AD	Shyam Sunder Sharma	71,007	35.16	−
BSP	Ram Pal Singh	32,246	15.97	−
	Remainder 10 candidates	11,659	5.76	−
Majority		16,055	7.95	−
Turnout		201,974	70.38	−
RLD hold		Swing		

== See also ==
- Mathura district
- Mathura Lok Sabha constituency
- Sixteenth Legislative Assembly of Uttar Pradesh
- Uttar Pradesh Legislative Assembly
