= Khair =

Town in Uttar Pradesh, India

- Town
- Location in Uttar Pradesh, India Khair (India)
- Coordinates: 27.95°N 77.83°E
- Country: India
- State: Uttar Pradesh
- District: Aligarh

Government
  - Type: Tehsil
  - Body: Nagar Palika Parishad
  - MLA: Anoop Valmiki (BJP)
  - MP: Satish Gautam(BJP)
  - Chairman: Sanjay Sharma
- Elevation: 188 m (617 ft)

Population (2011)
  - Total: 35,751

Language
  - Official: Hindi
  - Additional official: Urdu
  - Regional: Brajbhasha
- Time zone: UTC+5:30 (IST)
- PIN: 202138
- Telephone code: 05724
- Vehicle registration: UP-81
- Vidhan Sabha constituency: Khair
- Lok Sabha constituency: Aligarh

Khair is a town and a municipal board in Aligarh district in the Indian state of Uttar Pradesh. Khair is the largest town of Aligarh district. It is situated around 27 km from Aligarh, 114 km from Delhi and 60 km from Mathura.

== History ==
The town was held by Amar Singh Jat during the 17th century. Amar Singh revolted against the Mughal Empire and declared his independent. He also built the fortress of Rait and became the leader of the rebels of Tappal, Khurja, Koel, Chandausi and Atrauli parganas.

== Demographics ==
As of 2011 Indian Census, Khair had a total population of 35,751, of which 19,019 were males and 16,732 were females. Population within the age group of 0 to 6 years was 5,322. The total number of literates in Khair was 20,334, which constituted 56.9% of the population with male literacy of 63.4% and female literacy of 49.4%. The effective literacy rate of 7+ population of Khair was 66.8%, of which male literacy rate was 74.5% and female literacy rate was 58.0%. The Scheduled Castes and Scheduled Tribes population was 6,485 and 6 respectively. Khair had 5883 households in 2011.

== Education ==
- Panchsheel City School Khair

== See also ==
- Block colony, Khair
- List of cities in Uttar Pradesh
