= Mant tehsil =

Mant Tehsil
- Tehsil, Town
- Mat Tehsil Location in Uttar Pradesh, India Mant Tehsil (India)
- Coordinates: 27.636365°N 77.712383°E
- Country: India
- State: Uttar Pradesh
- Elevation: 189 m (620 ft)

Population (2011)
  - Total: 21,344

Languages
  - Official: Hindi, Brij Bhasa
- Time zone: UTC+5:30 (IST)
- Postal code: 281202
- Telephone code: 05663
- Vehicle registration: UP85 XXXX
- Sub-district code: 09140002
- Website: Tehsil Divas Official Website

Mant, also Mat, is a town and Tehsil in Mathura district of Uttar Pradesh, India. Mant is situated 23 kilometers (14.3 miles) from the city of Mathura and 45 kilometers (28 miles) from Khair City. It belongs to the Agra Division.

== Geography ==
Mant has 201 villages as of the 2011 Census of India.

== Politics ==
Mant (Assembly constituency) is the Vidhan Sabha constituency. Mathura (Lok Sabha constituency) is the parliamentary constituency.

== Transportation ==
Mant is connected to Bajna - Mathura Road and Yamuna Expressway.

== See also ==
- Mathura district.
- Neemgaon
