= Paigaon =

Village in Uttar Pradesh, India

Coordinates: 27°47′N 77°32′E

Paigaon is a large village in the Chhata constituency of the Mathura district, Uttar Pradesh, India. It is connected by road to Kosi Kalan and Shergarh. Chhata railway station is the nearest railway station. Kosikala is nearest town to paigaon for all major economic activities, which is approximately 10 km away.

== Culture ==
A two-day fair is organized every year in Paigaon. Which is dedicated to Naga Baba, a great saint of Paigaon. Naga Baba was a great devotee of Krishna.

== Language ==
The native language of Paigaon is Hindi, Braj Bhasha and most of the village people speak this language and use it for communication.

== See also ==
- Krishna Janmasthan Temple Complex
- Ram Janmabhoomi, Rama's birthplace
- Kundinapuri, Rukmini's birthplace
- Kaundinyapur, near Nagpur and associated with Rukmini's birthplace Kundinapuri
- Raval, Mathura, Radha's birthplace
- Parikrama
- Yatra
