= Chaumuhan =

City in Uttar Pradesh, India

Chaumuhan, Mathura
- Town
- Location in Uttar Pradesh, India
- Coordinates: 27°38′24″N 77°35′02″E
- Country: India
- State: Uttar Pradesh
- District: Mathura

Government
  - Chairman(President): Mr. Bihari Ram (pahalwan) Yuva neta = VIPUL GUPTA

Population (2018)
  - Total: 19,675
  - Density: 3,000/km^{2} (7,800/sq mi)

Languages
  - Official: Hindi
- Time zone: UTC+5:30 (IST)
- PIN: 281406
- Telephone code: 05662
- Website: www.npchaumuhan.in

Chaumuhan (Chaumuhanā) is a town and a nagar panchayat in the Mathura district of the Indian state of Uttar Pradesh.

== Geography ==
Chaumuhan is located on the NH19 highway, 90 kilometres (56 mi) from the Delhi Badarpur Border. It lies 20 kilometres (12 mi) from the neighboring city of Kosi Kalan and 10 kilometres (6.2 mi) from Tahashil Chhata.

== History ==
Brahma Vimohan Leela took place during Krishna's time. Bewildered by the simplicity of Krishna as a child, Brahma stole Krishna's calves and cowherds. Realizing this, Krishna expanded into the same number of calves and cowherds and life remained undisturbed in Braj. Brahma realized his mistake and did penance at the Brahma Jhaadi (Chaumuha) and apologized to Krishna there. He did so after bathing in the nearby Chandra Sarovar (which was partly restored by the Braj Foundation). Because of this pastime the village was named Chaumuha, indicating four heads of Brahma. Only two temples of Brahma Ji exist; one in Pushkar (Ajmer) and the other in Chaumuha.

== Demographics ==
As of the 2012 Indian census, the town had a population of 9,881 of which 54% were male and 46% female. Literacy is higher than the national average at close to 95% for men and 70% for women, and 45% of the population is under age six.

== Religion ==
=== Facilities ===
- Brahma Ji Mandir dedicated to Lord Brahma and mela organizes every year on the first day of Shradd. Kusti dangal organize the mela.
- Gopal Ji Mandir dedicated to Lord Krishna
- Bihari ji Mandir dedicated to Lord Krishna
- Radha Mohan ji Mandir dedicated to Lord Krishna
- Bala Ji Mandir Dedicated to Lord Hanuman Ji
- Dauji Mandir Dedicated to Lord Dauji
- Shri Radha Krishna Mandir Dedicated to Lord Krishna
- Other (Bajar Wala mandir, Pathwari Mandir etc.)

=== History connected to Lord Brahma's bewilderment ===
It is said that once during a leela, Krishna drank buttermilk from a friend's cup. Lord Brahma was amazed at the act especially since Krishna was known to be an incarnation of Vishnu and drinking from a mortal's used cup was unacceptable behavior from a God.

Lord Brahma then grew suspicious and to test him he made all cows and cowherd friends of Krishna disappear. Krishna at once understood this divine game and extended himself to take the form of all his missing cows and cowherd friends to replace them so that their absence would go unnoticed. Brahma realized his mistake and asked forgiveness through penance that he did at the site that became Chandrasarovar. Lord Brahma brought the Moon God (Chandra) with him who built Chandrasarovar. In its clean and pure waters Brahma bathed before beginning his penance.

== Administrative regions ==
Chaumuhan is divided into blocks known as thok (Blocks or wards)

- Mani: The largest block and the location of Gopal ji mandir and Gram Block Chaumuhan.
- Thamu: Bihari Ji Mandir, Thamu is the second largest block.
- Jujhar:third largest block
- Daud:
- Marruf:
- Brahm Nagar Calony:
- Bajar:

== Resources ==
Although Chaumuhan has little industrial development, it is becoming a higher education hub as private institutes open there.

=== Higher education ===
- G.L.A. UNIVERSITY
- K.D. Medical College.

Sanjay Institute of Engineering and Management

- IVS Institute of Technology
- G.L Bajaj Group of Institutions
- Sarvodaya Mahavidhyalay,

=== Healthcare ===
- Prathmik Samudayak Hospital Chaumuhan.
- Prathmik Pashu Chikitsalaya Chaumuhan.
- K.D Medical College and research center.

== Economy ==
Although Chaumuhan possesses important resources but there are no small or large industries. The town is well placed as a transport hub, with the NH2 (Delhi-Agra) highway on one side and a railway station on the other with goods facilities and a medium-sized power station.

The Amrapali group is developing the new Krishna Lok Dham in Chaumuhan while other real estate companies are also planning to develop housing in Chaumuhan.

Rama Group is developing the Rama Garden City residential township in Chaumuhan. Manzil Developers is developing the MANZIL ABODE (102 acres residential Township) in Chaumuhan.

== See also ==
- Vrindavan
- Mathura
- Deeg
- Varsana
- Nandgaon, Uttar Pradesh
- Bharatpur
- Kosi
- Chhata
