= Chhata Assembly constituency =

Constituency of the Uttar Pradesh legislative assembly in India

Chhata
- Constituency No. 81 for the Uttar Pradesh Legislative Assembly

Constituency details
- Country: India
- Region: North India
- State: Uttar Pradesh
- District: Mathura
- Established: 1951
- Total electors: 3,53,054 (2019)
- Reservation: None

Member of Legislative Assembly
- 18th Uttar Pradesh Legislative Assembly
- Incumbent Laxmi Narayan Chaudhary
- Party: Bharatiya Janata Party
- Elected year: 2022
- Preceded by: Tejpal Singh

Chhata is one of the 403 constituencies of the Uttar Pradesh Legislative Assembly, in India. It is a part of Mathura district and one of the five assembly constituencies in the Mathura Lok Sabha constituency. The first election in this assembly constituency was held in 1952 after the "DPACO (1951)" (delimitation order) was passed in 1951. After the "Delimitation of Parliamentary and Assembly Constituencies Order" was passed in 2008, the constituency was assigned identification number 81.

== Wards / Areas ==
Extent of Chhata Assembly constituency is KCs Kosi Kalan, Nandgaon, Chaumuhan, PCs Hatana, Kharant, Falain-I, Guheta, Viswa, Paigaon, Chandauri, Nagla Hasnur, Baraka, Bukhrari, Ainch, Shahpur, Dhanauta, Roop Nagar, Sher Nagar, Majhoi, Barchawali, Bishambhara of Paigaon KC, PCs Dautana, Bhadawal, Bajna, Chintagarhi, Chhata-I, Chhata-II, Khanpur, Sankhi, Ranwari, Ajnothi, Ladpur, Bahrawali, Agrayala, Baheta, Kajrouth, Syaraha of Chhata KC, Kosi Kalan MB, Chhata NP, Chaumuhan NP, Nandgaon NP & Barsana NP of Chhata Tehsil.

== Members of the Legislative Assembly ==
Election	Name	Party22
1952	Ramhet Singh	Indian National Congress
1957	Ramhet Singh	Indian National Congress
1962	Lakhi Singh	Socialist Party
1967	Tikam Singh	Bharatiya Jana Sangh
1969	Tejpal	Indian National Congress
1974	Radha Charan	Bharatiya Kranti Dal
1977	Lakhi Singh	Janata Party
1980	Chandan Singh	Janata Party
1985	Chaudhary Laxmi Narayan Singh	Lokdal
1989	Kishori Shyam	Bharatiya Janata Party
1991	Kishori Shyam	Bharatiya Janata Party
1993	Tejpal Singh	Janata Dal
1996	Chaudhary Laxmi Narayan Singh	Indian National Congress
2002	Tejpal Singh	Rashtriya Lok Dal
2007	Chaudhary Laxmi Narayan Singh	Bahujan Samaj Party
2012	Tejpal Singh	Rashtriya Lok Dal
2017	Chaudhary Laxmi Narayan Singh	Bharatiya Janata Party
2022	Chaudhary Laxmi Narayan Singh	Bharatiya Janata Party

== Election results ==
=== 2027 ===
2027 Uttar Pradesh Legislative Assembly election: Chhata
Party	Candidate	Votes	%	±%
INDIA				
NDA				
BSP				
NOTA	None of the above			
Majority				
Turnout				
gain from		Swing		

=== 2022 ===
2022 Uttar Pradesh Legislative Assembly election: Chhata
Party	Candidate	Votes	%	±%
BJP	Chaudhary Laxmi Narayan Singh	124,414	52.18	+0.47
RLD	Tejpal Singh	75,466	31.65	+27.34
BSP	Sonpal Singh	30,214	12.67	−5.49
NOTA	None of the above	977	0.41	−0.13
Majority		48,948	20.53	−7.56
Turnout		238,419	65.34	−1.5
BJP hold		Swing		

=== 2017 ===
2017 Uttar Pradesh Legislative Assembly election: Chhata
Party	Candidate	Votes	%	±%
BJP	Chaudhary Laxmi Narayan Singh	117,537	51.71	
Independent	Atul Singh	53,699	23.62	
BSP	Manoj Pathak	41,290	18.16	
RLD	Rishi Raj	9,801	4.31	
NOTA	None of the above	1,224	0.54	
Majority		63,838	28.09	
Turnout		227,322	66.84	

=== 2012 ===
2012 Uttar Pradesh Legislative Assembly election: Chhata
Party	Candidate	Votes	%	±%
RLD	Tejpal Singh	94,757	45.04	−
BSP	Chaudhary Laxmi Narayan Singh	80,163	38.1	−
Independent	Hemant Singh	11,868	5.64	−
	Remainder 12 candidates	23,609	11.22	−
Majority		14,594	6.94	−
Turnout		210,397	69.66	−
RLD gain from BSP		Swing		

== See also ==
- Mathura district
- List of constituencies of the Uttar Pradesh Legislative Assembly
