= Dautana =

Town in Mathura, Uttar Pradesh

Coordinates: 27°46′N 77°29′E

Dautana is a semi-urban village situated in NH2 Delhi Agra Highway. Dautana village is located in Chhata Tehsil of Mathura district in Uttar Pradesh, India.
