= Vrindaban Road railway station =

Railway station in Uttar Pradesh, India

General information
- Location: Vrindavan, Uttar Pradesh, India; India
- Coordinates: 27.5558°N 77.6236°E
- Elevation: 180 metres (590 ft)
- System: Indian Railways station
- Owner: Indian Railways
- Operator: North Central Railway
- Line: Agra–Delhi chord
- Platforms: 4
- Tracks: 8 (Quadruple Electrified BG)

Construction
- Structure type: Standard on ground
- Parking: No
- Cycle facilities: No

Other information
- Status: Functioning
- Station code: VRBD
- Zone(s): North Central Railway
- Division(s): Agra

History
- Former names: Bombay, Baroda and Central India Railway
Location
- Location within India Location within Uttar Pradesh

Vrindaban Road railway station is a railway station on the Agra–Delhi chord. It is located in Mathura district in the Indian state of Uttar Pradesh. Its code is VRBD. It serves the town of Vrindavan. The station consists of four platforms. The platforms are not well sheltered. It lacks many facilities including water and sanitation. Ashish Kumar is currently serving as the station manager.

== Overview ==
Krishna was born in Mathura. He spent his childhood in Vrindavan. Therefore, both are major pilgrimage centres for Hindus.

== History ==
The station lies on Delhi–Mathura branch line of Delhi–Kanpur section of North Central Railway.

== See also ==
- Vrindavan railway station
- Mathura Junction railway station

Preceding station	Indian Railways	Following station
Ajhai towards ?	North Central Railway zone Agra–Delhi chord	Bhuteshwar towards ?
