= Hathakauli =

- Village
- Country: India
- State: Uttar Pradesh
- District: Mathura

Population
  - Total: ~6,000

Languages
  - Official: Hindi
- Time zone: UTC+5:30 (IST)
- PIN: 281301
- Telephone code: 05661-
- Vehicle registration: UP85-
- Nearest city(town): Baldeo
- Literacy: ~98%
- Lok Sabha constituency: Mathura
- Vidhan Sabha constituency: Baldeo
- Website: up.gov.in

Hathakauli is an Indian village, which lies just next to Baldeo on the road joining to Agra from Baldeo en route Khandauli. Hathakauli has been notified by the Government of Uttar Pradesh as one of the area under Taj Expressway Industrial Development Authority to be developed as an industrial area in upcoming years. The village is situated at ~130 km mark on newly constructed 6 lane Yamuna Expressway (previously called as Taj Expressway) (Noida to Agra) and about 2.0 km from Baldeo, the city of Lord Balaram, the elder brother of Krishna.

== Jat Gotras ==
- Sikarwar
- Ghataina
- Bharangar

The village is one of the twelve villages of Sikarwar Gotra in district Mathura. Sikarwars are the majority; however, there are also Bharangar and Ghataina Gotra in the village.

== History and Leadership ==
The village Hathakauli is famous for extensive ptato crop production in Mathura. The other crops being cultivated are wheat, pulses, cotton and forage. The village has several education institutions (schools) up to 12th standard, a water over head tank, a veterinary hospital, and two huge cold storage for potato farming. The majority of the villagers are Jats, while the others include Scheduled Caste (SC) and Scheduled Tribe (ST) people.

Mahashay Biri Singh, Shri Kharag Singh, Shri Komal Singh and others were famous freedom fighters in British Ruled India during Indian Independence Movement and endured several jail terms towards fighting for Independence of our country. Shri Kharag Singh was elected as the first Gram Pradhan (Head of the Village) in post-independent India. Shri Jagan Singh, Shri Jaybeer Singh, Shri Banbari Lal, Tej Singh, Shyambeer Singh, Smt. Rajani Devi, Vijendra Singh and Seema Devi have been the elected Gram Pradhan of Hathakauli in previous years.

Journalist Jaypal Sikarwar who had Chief Editor/owned of 'Satyarth Prahar' (newspaper) also famous for his achievements and social service.

Many Jat inhabitants of the village are serving in Indian Defense (Indian Army, Indian Navy and Indian Air Force), various central/state government offices, educationist (teachers), scientists, journalists, various companies and in management / computer services.

== Monuments ==
Shri Shri 1008 Tede Mede Baba (टेढे मेढे बाबा - a pious saint) is supposed to be the most respectable icon and is worshiped throughout the village for prosperity and success.
