= Shahi Eidgah =

Shahi Eidgah (lit. 'royal eidgah') is an open-air urban prayer hall meant for Eid festival prayers, built by a Mughal ruler. It may refer to:

- Sylhet Shahi Eidgah, in Sylhet, Bangladesh, built in the 17th century
- Dhanmondi Shahi Eidgah, in Dhaka, Bangladesh, with an urban open space and mosque built in the 17th century
- Shahi Eid Gah Mosque, in Multan, Pakistan
- Shahi Eidgah Mosque, located near Krishna Janmasthan Temple Complex in Mathura, India
