= Sachdeva Institute of Technology =

Coordinates: 27.2927°N 77.7923°E

- Location: Farah, Mathura, India

Sachdeva Institute of Technology is an educational institute in India. There are four major schools in the organization: SIT- Sachdeva Institute of Technology, SP - Sachdeva Polytechnic, SIE - Sachdeva Institute of Education, SIS - and Sachdeva International School. The institute offers bachelor of technology degrees, as well as MBAs and B.Eds. Branches among others include computer science, electronics and communication, mechanical engineering, and electrical engineering. The school is associated with the Dr. A.P.J. Abdul Kalam Technical University in Lucknow.

== See also ==
- List of colleges affiliated to the Dr. A.P.J. Abdul Kalam Technical University
- Agra#Universities and colleges
- Mathura district#Education
