= Chaudhary Laxmi Narayan Singh =

Indian politician

Laxmi Narayan Chaudhary

Minister of sugar mill and sugarcane development Government of Uttar Pradesh
- Incumbent
- Assumed office March 2017
- Chief Minister: Yogi Adityanath
- Preceded by: Ram Murti Verma

Member of the Uttar Pradesh legislative assembly
- Incumbent
- Assumed office 11 March 2017
- Preceded by: Tejpal Singh
- Constituency: Chhata
- In office May 2007 – March 2012
- Preceded by: Tejpal Singh
- Succeeded by: Tejpal Singh
- In office October 1996 – February 2002
- Preceded by: Tejpal Singh
- Succeeded by: Tejpal Singh
- In office March 1985 – November 1989
- Preceded by: Chandan Singh
- Succeeded by: Kishori Shyam

Personal details
- Born: Chaudhary Laxmi Narayan Singh; 22 July 1951 (age 75) Mathura, Uttar Pradesh, India
- Party: Bharatiya Janata Party
- Other political affiliations: Bahujan Samaj Party (2007-2017); Indian National Congress (1996-2007); Lokdal (1985-1996)
- Spouse: Mamta Chaudhary (m. 1979)
- Parent: Ratiram Chaudhary
- Education: Agra University (L.L.B.)
- Occupation: MLA
- Profession: Politician
- As on 14 April 2020

Chaudhary Laxmi Narayan Singh is an Indian politician and member of 9th, 13th, 15th and 17th Legislative Assembly of Uttar Pradesh. And currently serving as Minister of Dairy Development, Animal Husbandry, Fisheries in Yogi Adityanath ministry. He represents the Chhata constituency as a candidate of the Bharatiya Janata Party in the Uttar Pradesh Legislative Assembly. He was previously a member of the Bahujan Samaj Party and was a cabinet minister in the government led by chief minister Mayawati.

== Political career ==
In 2006, Chaudhury joined the Bahujan Samaj Party. In the BSP government, he was the agricultural minister and was portrayed by the media as the party's "Jat face". He assisted chief minister Mayawati in pacifying agitation in Jat majority areas. He also said to the Jat farmers that the government was not against the farmers.

In July 2015, Chaudhary along with a former mayor of Agra joined the Bharatiya Janata Party. In January 2017, he filed his nomination for 2017 Uttar Pradesh Legislative Assembly election, where he would contest from Chhata. He said that his intention was to carry Prime Minister Narendra Modi's mission of development forward. He won the election by defeating a Bahujan Samaj Party candidate. He was given the portfolio of Additional Charge of Dairy Industry, Culture, Minority Welfare, Religious activities by chief minister Yogi Adityanath.

After becoming a minister, Chaudhary said that the government would impose the "Gujarat model of dairy development". He also said that steps would be taken to prohibit illegal slaughter of cattle. It was also announced that the Sunni and Shia Waqf boards of the state would be dissolved. He cited the alleged scams involving the boards for this decision. Chaudhary said that an investigation by the Central Bureau of Investigation was required, and also alleged a scam of 1000 crore rupees associated with the boards. He was also made the party incharge of Kaushambi district.

== Views ==
Chaudhary is of the opinion that unlike the government of Akhilesh Yadav, the Yogi Adityanath government does not indulge in politics of appeasement. He also said Uttar Pradesh was heading towards ''Rama Rajya'' (kingdom of Hindu god Rama) during the government of Adityanath. He also said that the celebrations of Ramlila in Ayodhya and Rasa lila in Vrindavan were evidences of his claim.

== Personal life ==
In January 2017, Chaudhary was injured in a road accident while on his way to attend a rally of Prime Minister Narendra Modi in Lucknow.
