= Bhuteshwar railway station =

Railway Station in Uttar Pradesh, India

General information
- Location: Bhuteswar-Janamubhumi road, Mathura, Uttar Pradesh; India
- Coordinates: 27°30′05″N 77°40′05″E
- Elevation: 181 metres (594 ft)
- System: Indian Railways junction station
- Owner: Indian Railways
- Operator: North Central Railway
- Line: Agra–Delhi chord
- Platforms: 3
- Tracks: 3

Construction
- Structure type: Standard on ground
- Parking: yes
- Cycle facilities: yes

Other information
- Status: Functioning
- Station code: BTSR
- Division(s): Agra

History
- Opened: 1959
- Rebuilt: 2020
- Electrified: 1982–85
- Former names: East Indian Railway Company
Location
- Location within Uttar Pradesh

Bhuteshwar railway station is on the Agra–Delhi chord . It is located in Mathura district in the Indian state of Uttar Pradesh. It serves the suburban areas of Mathura. It is nearby to Sri Krishna Janmbhoomi and Bhuteshwar Mahadev Temple.

== History ==
The broad gauge Agra–Delhi chord was opened in 1904. This railway station was built so as to manage short route trains. The name of this station was on Bhuteshwar Mahadev Temple. In the back days there was a huge mound called as "Bhuteshwar Tilla"

In recent time Indian railways is upgrading this station due to the rail line project between Mora and Mathura to streamline the traffic flow for trains.

== Electrification ==
The Faridabad–Mathura–Agra section was electrified in 1982–85.

== Passengers ==
Bhuteshwar railway station serves around 36,000 passengers monthly

Preceding station	Indian Railways	Following station
Mathura Junction towards ?	North Central Railway zone Agra–Delhi chord	Vrindaban Road towards ?
Mathura Junction towards ?	North Central Railway zone Mathura–Alwar branch line	Mora towards ?
