= Farah, Mathura =

Farah Pharah
- Town
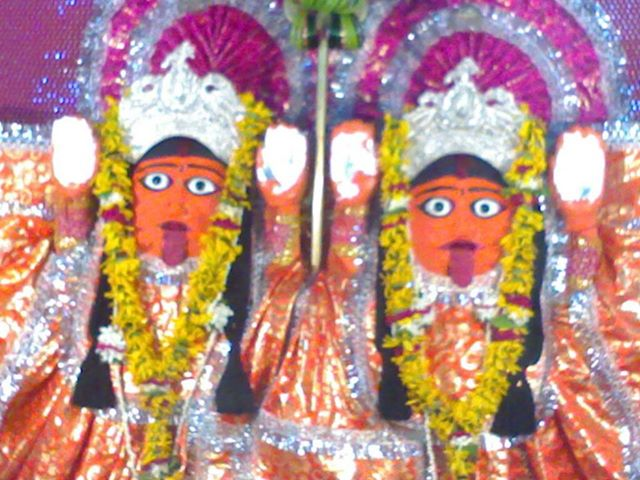
- Farah Devi Mata

- Location in Uttar Pradesh, India Farah (India)
- Coordinates: 27.33°N 77.77°E
- Country: India
- State: Uttar Pradesh
- District: Mathura
- Elevation: 172 m (564 ft)

Population (2001)
  - Total: 8,199

Languages
  - Official: Hindi
- Time zone: UTC+5:30 (IST)
- Website: www.npfarah.in

Farah is a town and a nagar panchayat in Mathura district in the state of Uttar Pradesh, India.

== Education ==
- Sachdeva Institute of Technology
- Hindustan College of Science and Technology

== Demographics ==
As of the 2001 Census of India, Farah had a population of 8,199. Males constitute 54% of the population and females 46%. Farah has an average literacy rate of 52%, lower than the national average of 59.5%: male literacy is 61%, and female literacy is 41%. In Farah, 20% of the population is under 6 years of age.

== Climate ==
Farah features a semiarid climate that borders on a humid subtropical climate. The town features mild winters, hot and dry summers and a monsoon season. However the monsoons, though substantial in Farah, are not quite as heavy as the monsoon in other parts of India. This is a primary factor in Farah featuring a semiarid climate as opposed to a humid subtropical climate.

Climate data for Farah, India
Month	Jan	Feb	Mar	Apr	May	Jun	Jul	Aug	Sep	Oct	Nov	Dec	Year
Mean daily maximum °C (°F)	22.3 (72.1)	25.5 (77.9)	31.9 (89.4)	37.9 (100.2)	41.7 (107.1)	40.7 (105.3)	35.3 (95.5)	33.2 (91.8)	34.0 (93.2)	34.0 (93.2)	29.2 (84.6)	23.9 (75.0)	32.5 (90.4)
Mean daily minimum °C (°F)	7.7 (45.9)	10.3 (50.5)	15.4 (59.7)	21.5 (70.7)	26.5 (79.7)	28.9 (84.0)	26.8 (80.2)	25.7 (78.3)	24.3 (75.7)	19.1 (66.4)	12.5 (54.5)	8.2 (46.8)	18.9 (66.0)
Average rainfall mm (inches)	13.3 (0.52)	17.7 (0.70)	9.1 (0.36)	6.7 (0.26)	11.9 (0.47)	55.7 (2.19)	203.3 (8.00)	241.1 (9.49)	128.5 (5.06)	25.2 (0.99)	4.3 (0.17)	6.0 (0.24)	722.8 (28.45)
Average rainy days	1.9	1.7	1.7	1.3	2.3	4.7	13.8	14.9	7.7	1.5	0.8	1.0	53.3
Source: World Meteorological Organization.

== Geography ==
Farah is located at 27.33°N 77.77°E. It has an average elevation of 172 metres (564 feet).
