= Nagla-Sanja =

Village in Uttar Pradesh, India

Nagla-Sanja is a village in Uttar Pradesh, India. It is located 25km from Mathura and lies in Baldeo block. A Shiva temple is situated at a distance of 3km from here. A big fair is held there on Lord Mahashivaratari every year.

The small village falls under Madaur Panchayath, Agra Division, 12 km from Baldeo and 349km from the state capital Lucknow. The Tehsils that surround Nagla-Sanja include Agra Tehsil, Bichpuri Tehsil, Kanshiram Nagar Tehsil, and Mahamaya Nagar Tehsil, all towards the south. The closest notable cities to Nangla-Sanja include Agra, Sadabad, Achhnera and Tundla. The small village is bordered by Mathura and Mahamaya Nagar Districts.
