= Tarauli =

- Village
- Location in Uttar Pradesh, India Tarauli (India)
- Coordinates: 26.75°N 79.84°E
- Country: India
- State: Uttar Pradesh
- District: Mathura
- Elevation: 170 m (560 ft)

Population (2011)
  - Total: 5,778

Languages
  - Official: Brij
- Time zone: UTC+5:30 (IST)
- PIN: 281406

The Tarauli is a village located in the Mathura district of Uttar Pradesh, India. It is located roughly 15 kilometres (9 mi) from Vrindavan and 20 kilometres (12 mi) from Mathura. The village is home to temples of Radha and Krishna.

== Etymology ==
The ancient name of the village, Tarauli, comes from Tarkasur slaughter.

== Geography ==
Tarauli is located at 26.75°N 79.84°E at an altitude of 830 feet (253 m).

== History ==
Tarauli village it takes to master the five-day fair lakkhi of Kartikeya is beginning to Devouthan. So what comes to fair competition seems to take a dip in the pool .. Devotthan Kartik Ekadashi in the month-long festival starting on Kartik Purnima, devotees of Swami Baba or Baba old known. The star lore atrocities eerie monster called gods Shiva and Parvati's son Kartikeya Swami arrived at the shelter. Kartikeya was determined to kill the demon Taraka. However, the austerity monster by Tarak has not die blessed. Public understanding of death tyranny was making himself immortal. In the pitched battle underwater Kartikeya slew of asterisks. Tarak monster Truli die because the name of the village was settled. Dig statue of Lord Kartikeya came out. It is an opinion that Truli village was built around nearly 1381-1384. The village at the time of Aurangzeb's rule, it was built by two brothers.
