= Patloni =

Coordinates: 23°35′N 79°33′E

Patloni is an Indian village about 5 kilometres (3.1 mi) from Baldeo on the road joining to Agra. The foundation of Patlauni village was laid something in 1625

The village has about 10,000 residents and 5 intermediate colleges and one degree college.(GLR degree college)

Patloni / Patlauni is a village in Mahavan tehsil of Mathura district. It is very big village having population 10000. This village is business hub and centric location of nearby villages. It has educational institutions, co-operative societies, post office, cold storages, bank, water overhead tank and other facilities too.

Many native citizens of Patloni are government officers, defense officers, educationalist, industrialist and big political figures.

Social composition of village: There are jat Brahmin, Vaishya, & Chamaar (SC) are main Hindu castes in this village. Roughly 50% Brahmin (mainly Gautam) 20% Jat 5% Vaishya (mainly Mittal) 15% SC (mainly Chamar) 10% other castes

Business composition of village: Mostly villagers dependent on farming. Few are in local business. 50%: Farming and government jobs 40%: Business 10%: Migrated outside

One more important point to add here it is that around 30% of family has at least one member of family is serving in Army.

Orkut Community https://web.archive.org/web/20100108202310/http://www.orkut.com/Main#Community?rl=cpn&cmm=39703068

Map Link http://www.wikimapia.org/#lat=27.379694&lon=77.8685188&z=17&l=0&m=b
