= Bhavanpura, Mathura =

Bhavanpura
- Village
- Country: India
- State: Uttar Pradesh

Languages
  - Official: Hindi
- Time zone: UTC+5:30 (IST)
- PIN: 281501
- Vehicle registration: UP
- Website: up.gov.in

Bhavanpura is a village in the Govardhan Tehsil in the Indian state of Uttar Pradesh. Bhawanpura is a village in the Goverdan tehsil of Mathura district of the Indian state of Uttar Pradesh. It is located about 22 km from its District headquerters Mathura.

== Location ==
It is located 22 km west of Mathura, which is the district headquarters, and 407 km from the state capital Lucknow.

=== Rail ===
Goverdhan Railway Station is the nearest railway station from Bhavanpura. Mathura Junction railway station is a major railway station situated 19 km away.

== Education ==
=== Colleges ===
- Maa Sntoshi Devi Inter College Ading, Mathura

=== Schools ===
The schools nearby are:

- R Kj.h.s. Areeng
- Jhs.nagla Ganthouli
- Jhs.malhoo
