= Ajhai railway station =

Railway station in Uttar Pradesh, India

General information
- Location: Uttar Pradesh; India
- Coordinates: 27.6362°N 77.5581°E
- Operator: Indian Railways
- Line: Agra–Delhi chord
- Platforms: 4
- Connections: 10 express trains

Construction
- Parking: Available

Other information
- Station code: AJH
- Fare zone: NCR/North Central
Location
- Location within Uttar Pradesh

Ajhai railway station, station code AJH, is on the Agra–Delhi chord. It is located in Mathura district in the Indian state of Uttar Pradesh. It serves the nearby city of Chaumuhan and nearby villages.

== Electrification ==
The Faridabad – Mathura Agra section was electrified in 1982–1985.
