= Magorra, Uttar Pradesh =

Magorra
- Town
- Location in Uttar Pradesh, India
- Coordinates: 27.5°N 77.47°E
- Country: India
- State: Uttar Pradesh
- District: Mathura
- Elevation: 179 m (587 ft)

Population (2011)
  - Total: 13,690

Languages
  - Official: Hindi
  - Native: Braj Bhasha dialect
- Time zone: UTC+5:30 (IST)
- PIN: 281502
- Vehicle registration: UP-85

Magorra is a town and a nagar panchayat in the Mathura district of the Indian state of Uttar Pradesh.

== History ==
Magorra in present is a historical village (presently a town) near Saunkh. Magorra has been recorded in Hindi literature by Dr Varun Kumar Chaudhary, popularly known by his pen name Antriksh, in his book "Kumbh Mela: Ek Doctor Ki Yatra" (ISBN 978 - 93 - 82937 - 11 - 1). This travelogue is published by Nikhil Publishers and Distributors, Agra. The name of village 'Magorra' is mentioned in a section on page number 149 of the first edition of this book.
