= Vrindavan railway station =

Railway Station in Uttar Pradesh, India

General information
- Location: Vrindavan, Mathura district, Uttar Pradesh; India
- Coordinates: 27°34′34″N 77°41′38″E
- Elevation: 176 metres (577 ft)
- System: Indian Railways station
- Owner: Indian Railways
- Operator: North Central Railway
- Line: Mathura–Vrindavan line
- Platforms: 1
- Tracks: Dismantled

Construction
- Structure type: Standard on ground
- Parking: Yes

Other information
- Status: Closed
- Station code: BDB
- Division(s): Agra

History
- Opened: 1889
- Closed: 2023
Location
- Location within Uttar Pradesh Location within India

Vrindavan railway station is on the Mathura–Vrindavan link. It is located in Mathura district in the Indian state of Uttar Pradesh. It serves Vrindavan.

== Overview ==
Krishna was born in Mathura. He spent his childhood in Vrindavan. Therefore, both Mathura and Vrindavan are major pilgrimage centres for Hindus.

== History ==
The 11 km (7 mi)-long 1,000 mm (3 ft 3 3/8 in)-wide metre-gauge Mathura–Vrindaban branch line was opened by Bombay, Baroda and Central India Railway in 1889. The Railway Ministry has permanently closed its ambitious project for the conversion of the Mathura-Vrindavan railway line from metre gauge to broad gauge at an estimated cost of Rs 402 crore, terming it "uneconomical".

== Trains ==
Mathura is a major railway junction. The Taj Express travelling from Hazrat Nizamuddin railway station covers the distance up to Mathura in about 2 hours. Bhopal Shatabdi Express (starting from New Delhi railway station), travelling faster, also stops at Mathura. There are five DEMU connections a day between Mathura and Vrindavan.

Preceding station	Indian Railways	Following station
Terminus	North Central Railway zone Mathura–Vrindavan link	Masani towards ?
