= Chhata =

Chhata Chhatravan
- town
- Location in Uttar Pradesh, India Chhata (India)
- Coordinates: 27.72°N 77.5°E
- Country: India
- State: Uttar Pradesh
- District: Mathura
- Elevation: 186 m (610 ft)

Population (2001)
  - Total: 19,836

Languages
  - Official: Hindi
- Time zone: UTC+5:30 (IST)
- Vehicle registration: UP
- Website: nagarpanchayatchhata.in

Chhata is a small city and a nagar panchayat in Mathura district in the state of Uttar Pradesh, India. Earlier this city was known as Chhatravan.

== Geography ==
Chhata is located at 27.72°N 77.5°E. It has an average elevation of 186 metres (610 feet).

== Demographics ==
As of 2001 census of India, Chhata has a population of 19,836. Males constitute 54% of the population and females 46%. Chhata has an average literacy rate of 51%, lower than the national average of 59.5%; with male literacy of 63% and female literacy of 37%. 19% of the population is under 6 years of age.

== Politics ==
In Uttar Pradesh Legislative Assembly election, 2017 Laxmi Narayan Chaudhary of BJP became the Member of Legislative Assembly from Chhata Constituency.

== Industries ==
Chhata is a small Town but has many types of industries in and around the town.

=== Packaging material ===
Vacmet India, which is a packing material manufacturing company, has four production units in Chhata at different locations.

=== Beverages ===
Varun Beverages Limited is a bottling plant (Pepsi), there is another bottling plant belongs to Brindavan Agro Industries ( a franchise bottler for Coca-Cola).

=== Textiles ===
There are textile manufacturing and processing companies like Ginnifilaments limited which turned Chhata into a Mill town, a 25-year old textile mill situated in Chhata, providing employment for female and male workers of Chhata and neighboring villages.

The other old textile mills include Pashupati, Shamken, and newer textile companies like Jain Cord Industries Pvt Ltd, etc.

=== Sugar mill ===
A sugar mill (Chhata Sugar Mill) was established in 1975, which is closed now. The mill was started on 100 acres of land. It was the only sugar mill in Agra mandal.

== Nearby cities ==
- Vrindavan
- Mathura
- Khair
- Aligarh
