= Dwarkadhish Temple, Mathura =

Radha Dwarkadhish Temple in Mathura, Uttar Pradesh

Shri Dwarkadhish Temple
- Location in Uttar Pradesh

Religion
- Affiliation: Hinduism
- District: Mathura
- Deity: Dwarkadhish (Dwarkanath); Radharani (Vrindavaneshwari)
- Festivals: Hindola Festival, Janmashtami, Radhashtami, Holi, Sharad Purnima

Location
- Location: Mathura
- State: Uttar Pradesh
- Country: India
- Coordinates: 27.5051227°N 77.6850175°E

Architecture
- Type: Rajasthani
- Completed: 1814
- Elevation: 169.77 m (557 ft)

Shri Dwarkadhish Temple is a Hindu temple in Mathura, Uttar Pradesh, India. In this historic temple, Krishna is worshipped in his Dwarkanath or Dwarkadhish form along with his feminine counterpart goddess Radha in the form of Radharani. The temple belongs to Pushtimarg tradition.

The current structure of temple was built up by Seth Gokul Das Parikh, the treasurer of then Gwalior State (Scindia) in 1814, with approval and donation from Shrimant Daulatrao Scindia, Maharajah of Gwalior. Gokuldas was a devotee of the third Gaddi of the Pushtimarg whose seat is the Dwarkadhish temple in Kankroli, Rajasthan.

== Festivals ==
The main festival of the temple is called Hindola festival which is celebrated annually in the month of Shravana which usually falls in July–August. It is the 13 days long festival. During this festival, the temple is beautifully decorated in theme colours. The icons of Dwarkadhish and Radharani are brought out of their sanctum and are placed in beautifully decorated Jhoola (swing) adorned with golden and silver ornaments for the special darshan. Besides Hindola festival, temple also celebrates Janmashtami, Radhastami, Holi and Diwali with great fervour.

== See also ==
- Bankey Bihari Temple
- Radha Rani Temple
- Krishna Janambhoomi
- Nidhivan, Vrindavan
- Radha Raman Temple
- Radha Vallabh Temple, Vrindavan
- Radha Damodar Temple, Vrindavan
- Radha Madan Mohan Temple, Vrindavan
- Dwarkadhish Temple
