= Tejpal Singh =

Indian politician

Tejpal Singh is an Indian politician and a member of the 16th Legislative Assembly of India. Earlier, he was a member of Samajwadi Party.He is a member of the Rashtriya Lok Dal political party.

== Early life and education ==
Tejpal Singh was born in Mathura district. He attended Agra University and attained Master of Arts degree.

== Political career ==
Tejpal Singh has been a MLA for three terms. He represented the Chhata constituency and is a member of the Rashtriya Lok Dal political party.

In 1997, he criticised B. R. Ambedkar as the "biggest traitor of India" and a "British agent". He also criticised BJP for staying silent over the spread of Anti-Hindu sentiments by the Ambedkarites.

== Posts held ==
#	From	To	Position	Comments
01	2012	2017	Member, 16th Legislative Assembly	
02	2002	2007	Member, 14th Legislative Assembly	
03	1993	1995	Member, 12th Legislative Assembly	

== See also ==
- Chhata
- Sixteenth Legislative Assembly of Uttar Pradesh
- Uttar Pradesh Legislative Assembly
