= Krishna Janmasthan Temple Complex =

Birth place of Hindu god Krishna in Mathura, India

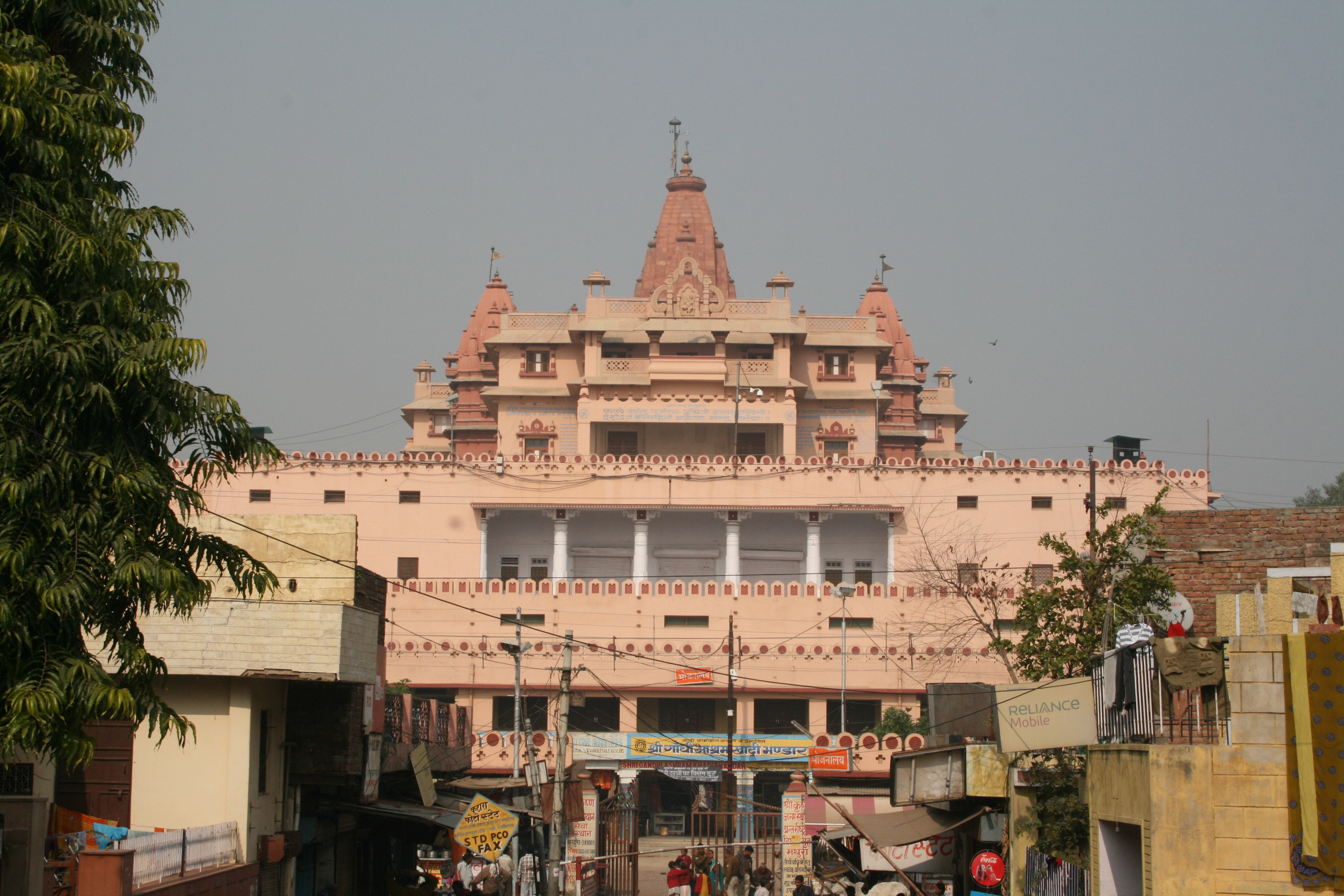
- Front view of Keshavdeva Temple

- Location in Uttar Pradesh

Religion
- Affiliation: Hinduism
- District: Mathura district
- Region: Braj
- Deity: Keshavdeva (Keshavdeva temple); Radha Krishna (Bhagvata Bhavan)
- Festival: Krishna Janmashtami
- Year consecrated: 1958 CE (modern temple)
- Status: Active

Location
- Location: Mathura
- State: Uttar Pradesh
- Country: India
- Interactive map of Krishna Janmasthan Temple Complex
- Coordinates: 27.504748°N 77.669754°E

Architecture
- Funded by: Dalmia and Birla family
- Groundbreaking: 1953 (modern temple)
- Completed: 1982
- Temple: Three

Krishna Janmasthan Temple is a Hindu temple situated in Mathura, Uttar Pradesh, India. There are three main temples inside the premises -- Keshavdev temple which is dedicated to Krishna, Garbh Griha where Krishna is believed to be born in Dvapar Yuga and Bhagvata Bhavan where presiding deities are Radha Krishna.

The place has held religious significance since at least the 6th century BCE with findings of religious artifacts in excavations. The temples were destroyed multiple times throughout history, most recently by the Mughal emperor Aurangzeb in 1670. He built the Shahi Eidgah mosque there, which still stands. In the 20th century, the new temple complex adjacent to mosque was built with the financial help from industrialists.

== History ==
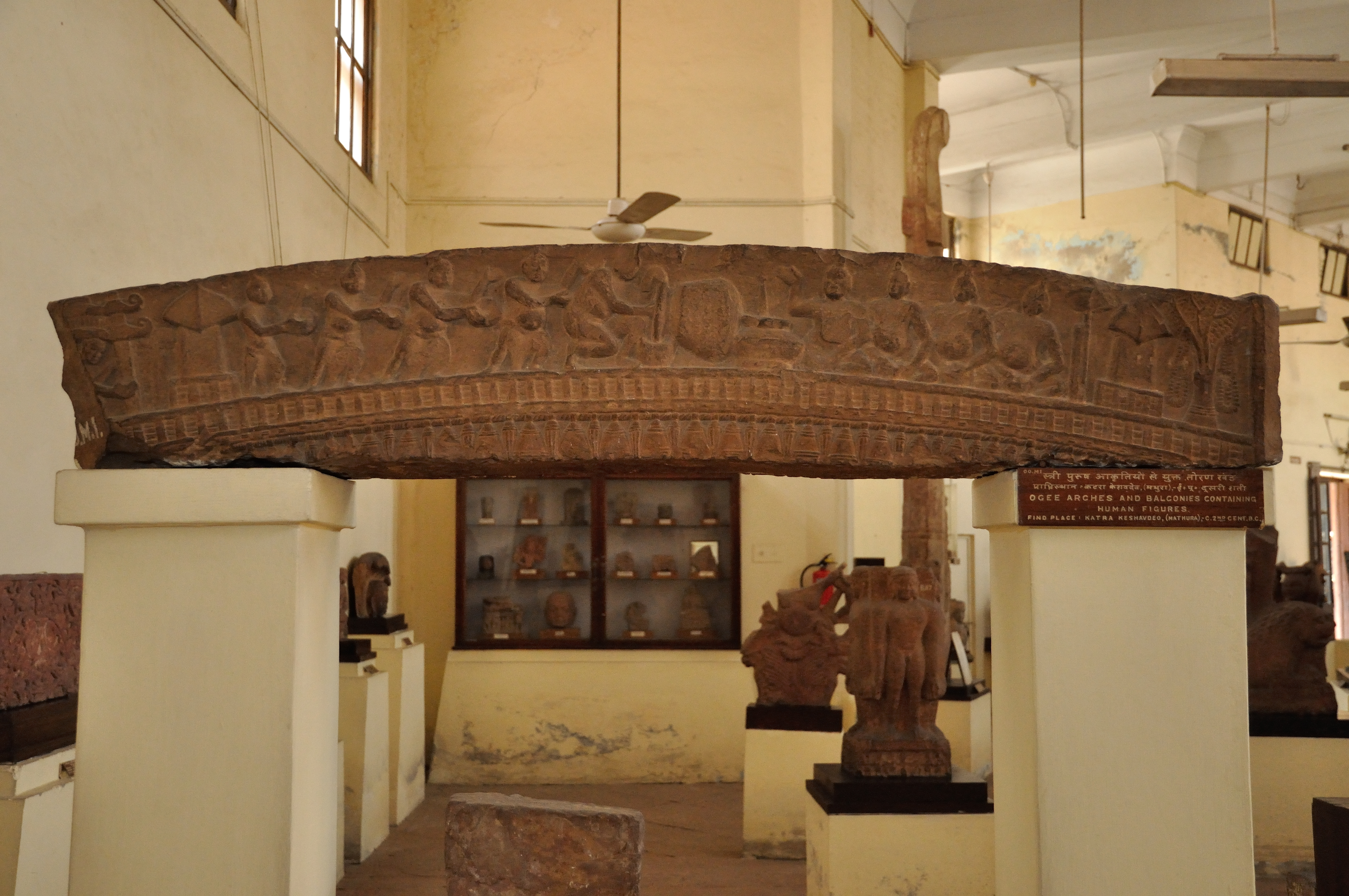
Ogee arches and balconies containing human figures, rear view, circa 2nd century BCE, found from archeological excavation of Katra Keshavdeva. Now in Government Museum, Mathura.

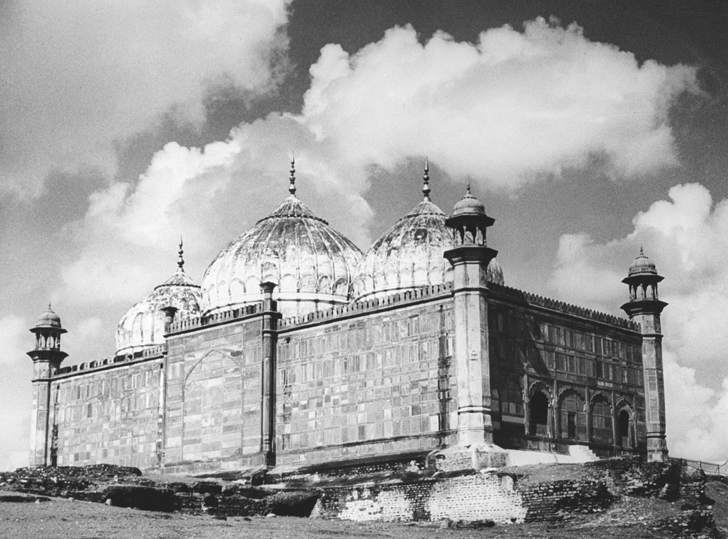
The Shahi Eidgah in 1949 which was constructed on the raised plinth of the original temple destroyed by Aurangzeb

=== Ancient and Classical Period ===
According to Hindu traditions, Krishna was born to Devaki and Vasudeva in a prison cell where they were confined by his maternal uncle Kamsa, a king of Mathura, due to prophecy of his death by the child of Devaki. According to tradition, a temple dedicated to Krishna was built the birthplace by his great-grandson Vajranabh. The present site known as Krishna Janmasthan (lit. 'birthplace of Krishna') was known as Katra (lit. 'market place') Keshavdeva. The archaeological excavations of the site had revealed pottery and terracotta from 6th century BCE. It also produced some Jain sculptures as well as a large Buddhist complex including Yasha Vihara. The Vaishnava temple may have erected on the place as early as the first century. A whole new magnificent temple complex was rebuilt at the place by Gupta Emperor Chandragupta II in 400CE. A late 8th century inscriptions also mentions donations to the site by the Rashtrakutas.

=== Medieval Period ===
In 1017 or 1018, Mahmud of Ghazni attacked and plundered Mahaban. He ordered to burn all the temples and demolish them. He plundered gold and silver statues and carried away a load of hundred camels. A stone inscription in Sanskrit found from the site mentions that in Vikram Samvat 1207 (1150) a person named Jajja who may have been a vassal of Gahadavala king built a Vishnu temple which was 'brilliantly white and touching the clouds'.

=== Mughal Period ===
Vaishnava saints Chaitanya Mahaprabhu and Vallabhacharya visited Mathura in early 16th century. Abdullah, in the reign of Mughal emperor Jehangir, mentions in Tarikh-i-Daudi the destruction of Mathura and its temples by Delhi Sultan Sikandar Lodi in 16th century. Lodi had prohibited Hindus from bathing in the river and shaving of heads on the banks as well. In the reign of Jehangir, in 1618, Raja Veer Singh Deva Bundela of Orchha had built a temple at the cost of thirty-three lakhs. A French traveller Tavernier visited Mathura in 1650 and had described the octagonal temple built in red sandstone. Italian traveller Niccolao Manucci who worked in Mughal court has also described the temple. Mughal prince Dara Shikoh had patronised the temple and donated a railing to the temple. The railing was removed by Mathura governor Abdun Nabi Khan on the order of Mughal emperor Aurangzeb and he built the Jama mosque on the ruins of the Hindu temples. During the Jat rebellion in Mathura, Abdul Nabi Khan was killed in 1669. Aurangzeb attacked Mathura and destroyed that Keshavdeva temple in 1670 and built the Shahi Eidgah in its place.

=== Modern Period ===
Mathura came under British control in 1804. The East India Company auctioned the 5.41 hectares (13.37 acres) of land of Katra and it was purchased by Raja Patnimal, a wealthy banker of Banaras. Raja Patnimal wanted to build the temple but could not do so. His descendants inherited the land of Katra and still maintained the full 5.41 hectares (13.37 acres) without splitting it up. His descendant Rai Krishna Das was challenged, for the ownership of 5.41 hectares (13.37 acres) of land on which the shrine and the Shahi Eidgah is situated, in two civil suits by the Muslims of Mathura but the Allahabad High Court ruled in favour of Raj Krishna Das in both suits in 1935. Kailash Nath Katju and Madanmohan Chaturvedi had helped in these lawsuits. Politician and educationist Madan Mohan Malaviya acquired the land from Raj Krishna Das on 7 February 1944 at the cost of Rs. 13000 with financial help of Industrialist Jugal Kishore Birla. Following the death of Malaviya, Jugal Kishore Birla formed a trust named Shri Krishna Janmabhoomi Trust, later registered as the Shri Krishna Janmasthan Seva Sansthan, on 21 February 1951 and acquired the full 5.41 hectares (13.37 acres) of land. Jugal Kishore Birla entrusted the construction of the new temple with another industrialist and philanthropist Jaidayal Dalmia. The construction of the temple complex was started in October 1953 with leveling of lands and completed in February 1982. His eldest son Vishnu Hari Dalmia succeeded him and served on the Trust until his death. His grandson Anurag Dalmia is Joint Managing Trustee on the Trust. The construction was funded by other business families including Ramnath Goenka.

In 1968, the Shree Krishna Janmasthan Seva Sangh and the Shahi Eidgah committee reached a compromise agreement which granted the temple land to the Trust and the management of the Shahi Eidgah to the Eidgah committee as well no legal claim of the Shree Krishna Janmasthan Seva Sangh on the Shahi Eidgah. Indian National Congress leader Ganesh Vasudev Mavalankar was the first chairman of the Shree Krishna Janmasthan Seva Sangh which signed the compromise agreement and his legal authority to sign agreement is contested. He was succeeded by M. A. Ayyangar, followed by Akhandananda Saraswati and Ramdev Maharaj. Nrityagopaldas is the present chairman. Following the demolition of the Babri Mosque in 1992, Manohar Lal Sharma, a resident of Vrindavan, has filed a petition in the Mathura District Court challenging the 1968 agreement as well as a petition to quash the Places of Religious Worship Act of 1991 which preserves the status quo as on 15 August 1947 for all places of worship.

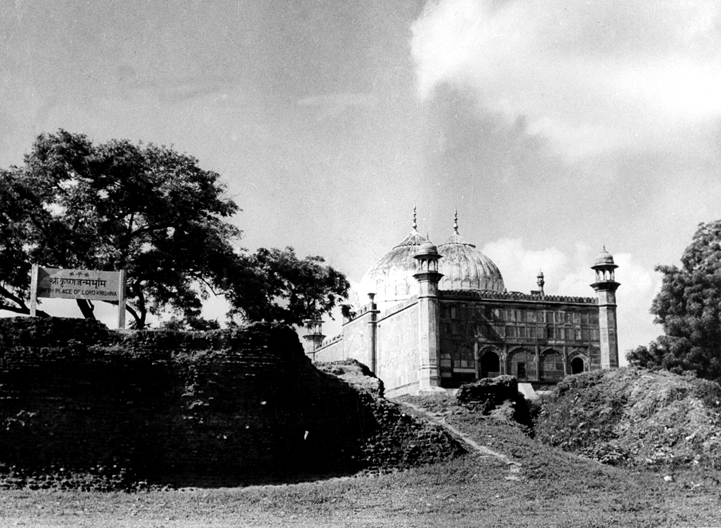
The site celebrated as the birthplace of Krishna who, as tradition goes, was born in a prison and the prison is said to have existed on the plot marked by a stone plate. To the right of it is the Shahi Eidgah. The image is taken in 1949 before the modern temple complex was built.

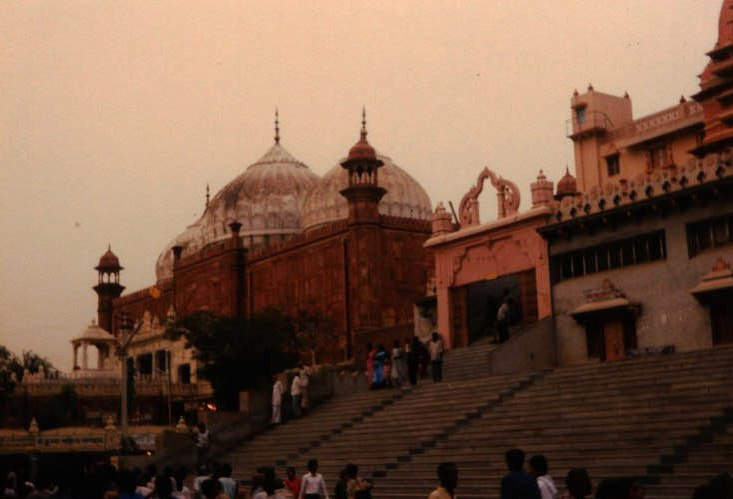
Garbha Griha shrine (left) behind the Eidgah (centre) and entrance of the Keshavdeva temple (right), 1988.

Location of temples and nearby water tank.

== Temples and monuments ==
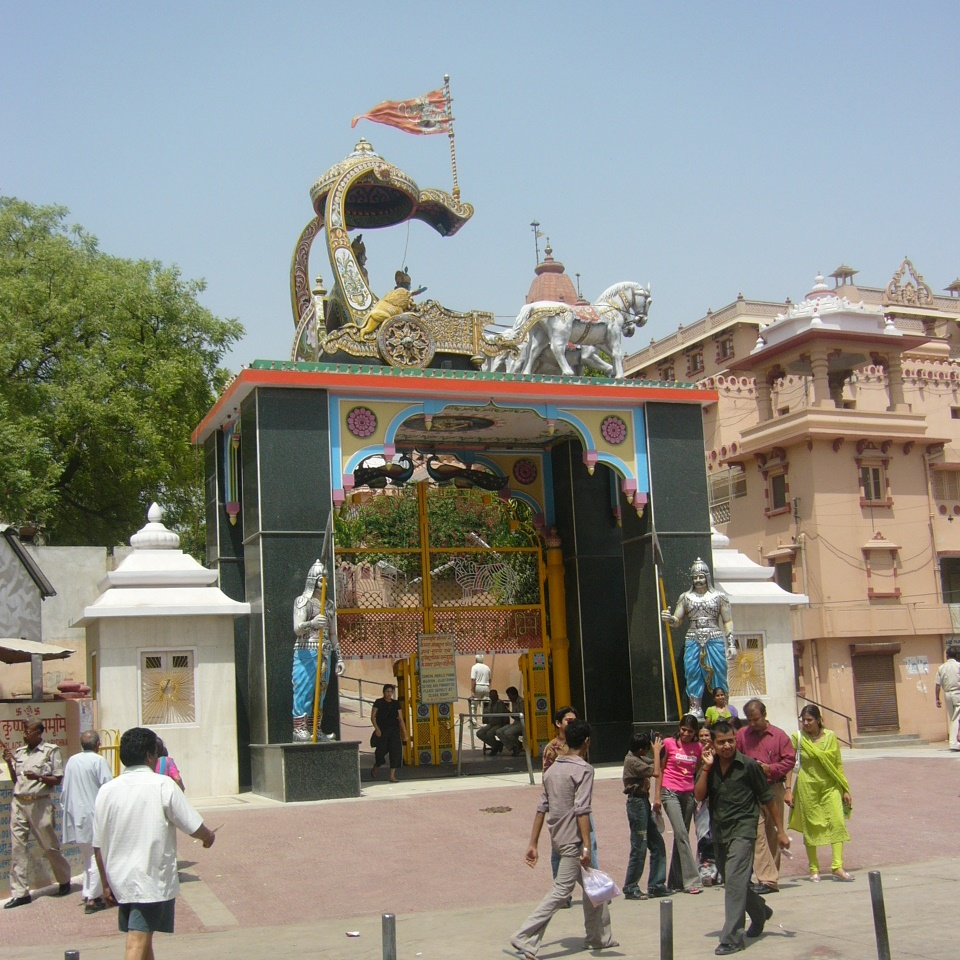
Entrance of the Krishna Janambhoomi temple complex

The temple complex contains Keshavdeva temple, Garbha Griha shrine and Bhagavata Bhavan.

=== Keshavdeva Temple ===
The Keshavdeva Temple was built by Ramkrishna Dalmia in memory of his mother Jadiadevi Dalmia. The construction of the temple started on 29 June 1957 and inaugurated on 6 September 1958 by Hanuman Prasad Poddar. It is located south of the Shahi Eidgah Mosque.

=== Garbha Griha shrine ===
It is said that Shahi Eidgah was constructed on the sabhamandapa (assembly hall) of the original temple and the garbha griha (sanctum sactorum) was left. It is considered as the place of the prison cell where Krishna is believed to have been born. A marble pavilion and an underground prison cell were built on the place with spacious veranda. There is shrine near it dedicated to eight-handed goddess Yogmaya. It is located against the rear wall of the Shahi Eidgah.

=== Bhagavata Bhavan ===
The construction of the temple dedicated to Shrimad Bhagavata was started on 11 February 1965 and the installation ceremony of the deities were held on 12 February 1982. It includes five shrines: the main shrine having a 180 centimetres (6 ft) tall couple of Radha and Krishna; the shrine of Balarama, Subhadra and Jagannatha on right; the temple of Rama, Lakshmana and Sita on left; Garuda Stambha (pillar) and Chaitanya Mahaprabhu in front of Jagannatha shrine and Hanuman in front of Ram shrine; the temple of Durga and the temple with Shivalinga. The ceiling, walls and pillars of the assembly hall are adorned with frescoes depicting life events of Krishna and his associates and devotees. The text of Bhagavad Gita engraved on copper-plates adorn the walls of the parikrama (circumambulation) of the main temple. There are statues of Malaviya and Birla in the complex. Other construction includes the Ayurveda Bhavan, International Guest House, shops, library and open space for performances.

=== Potra Kund ===
There is a large and deep stepped water tank, Potra Kund or Pavitra Kund, in south-east of the Janmasthan temple which is said to have been used for the first bath of child Krishna after his birth. The steps of the tank were built by Mahadji Scindia in 1782. They were restored by his descendants in 1850.

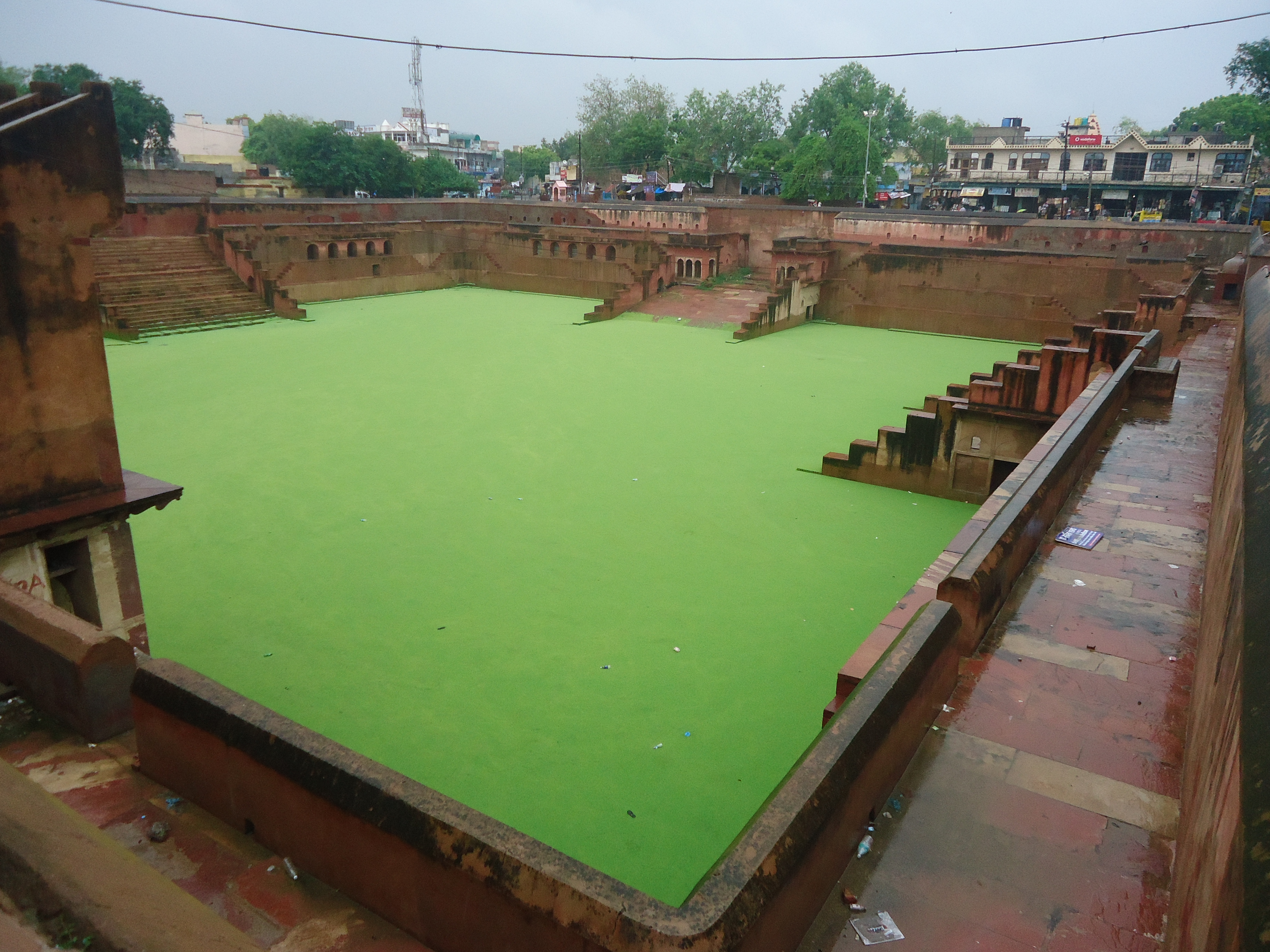
Potra Kund

== Culture ==
The temple is one of the most visited temples in India. Krishna Janmashtami, Radhashtami, Diwali and Holi are the major festivals celebrated at this temple and entire Braj region.

== See also ==
- Nandmahar Dham
- Dwarkadhish Temple, Mathura
- Ram Janmabhoomi, Rama's birthplace
- Janakpur Dham, Sita's birthplace in Nepal
- Punaura Dham, Sita's birthplace in India
- Kundinapuri, Rukmini's birthplace
- Kaundinyapur, near Nagpur and associated with Rukmini's birthplace Kundinapuri
- Raval, Uttar Pradesh, Radha's birthplace
- Parikrama
- Yatra
