= Mathura district =

- District of Uttar Pradesh
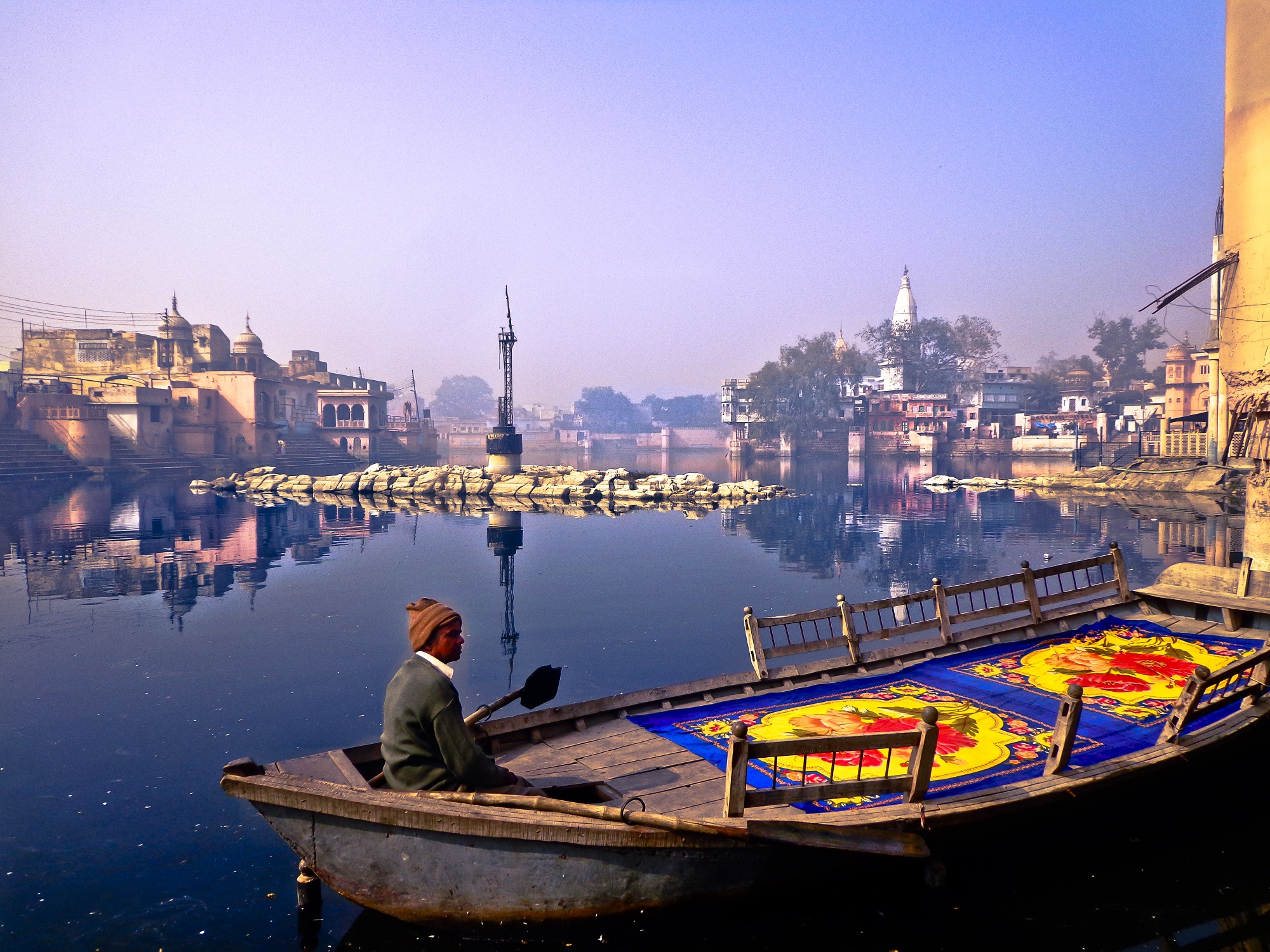
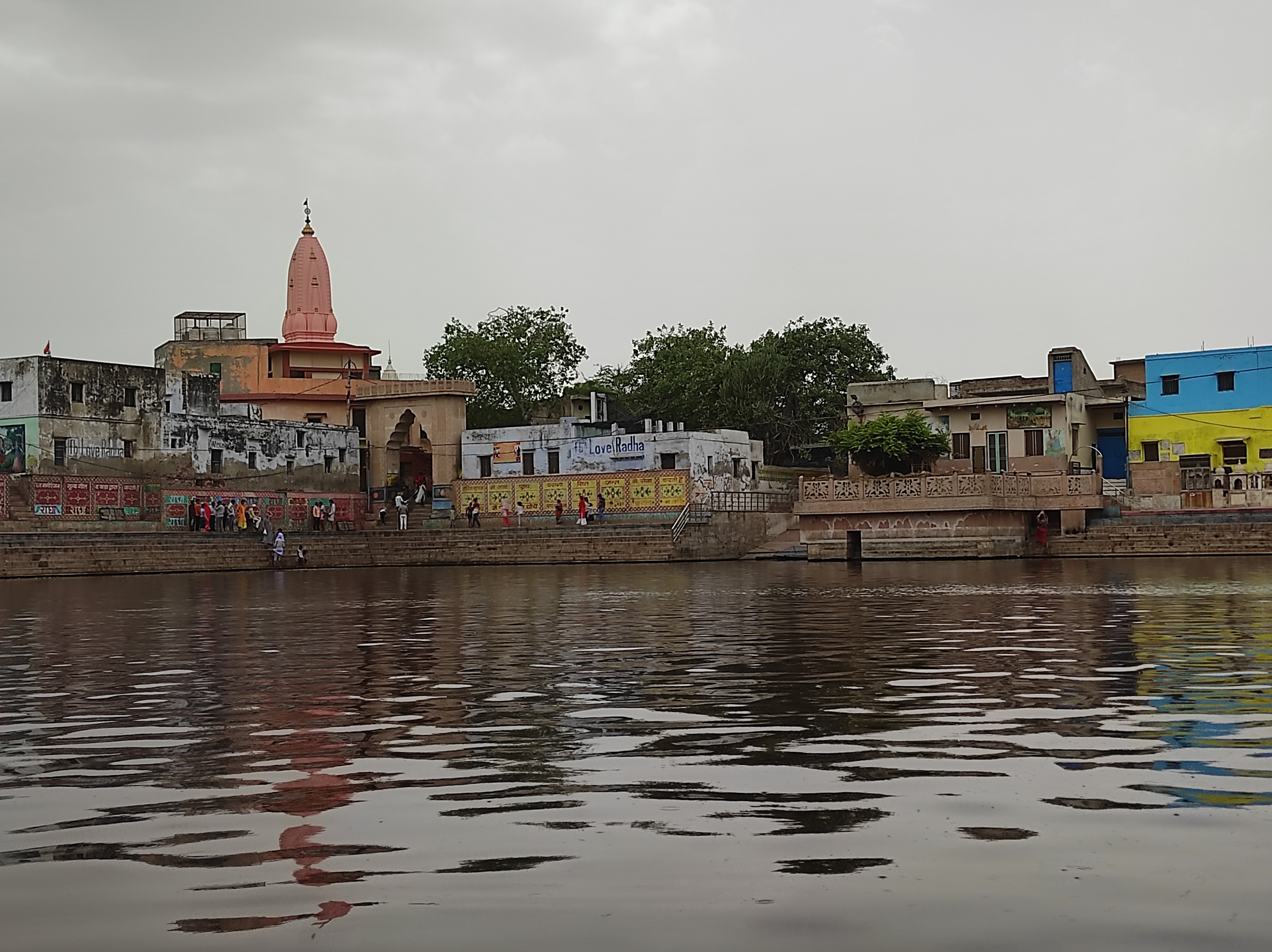
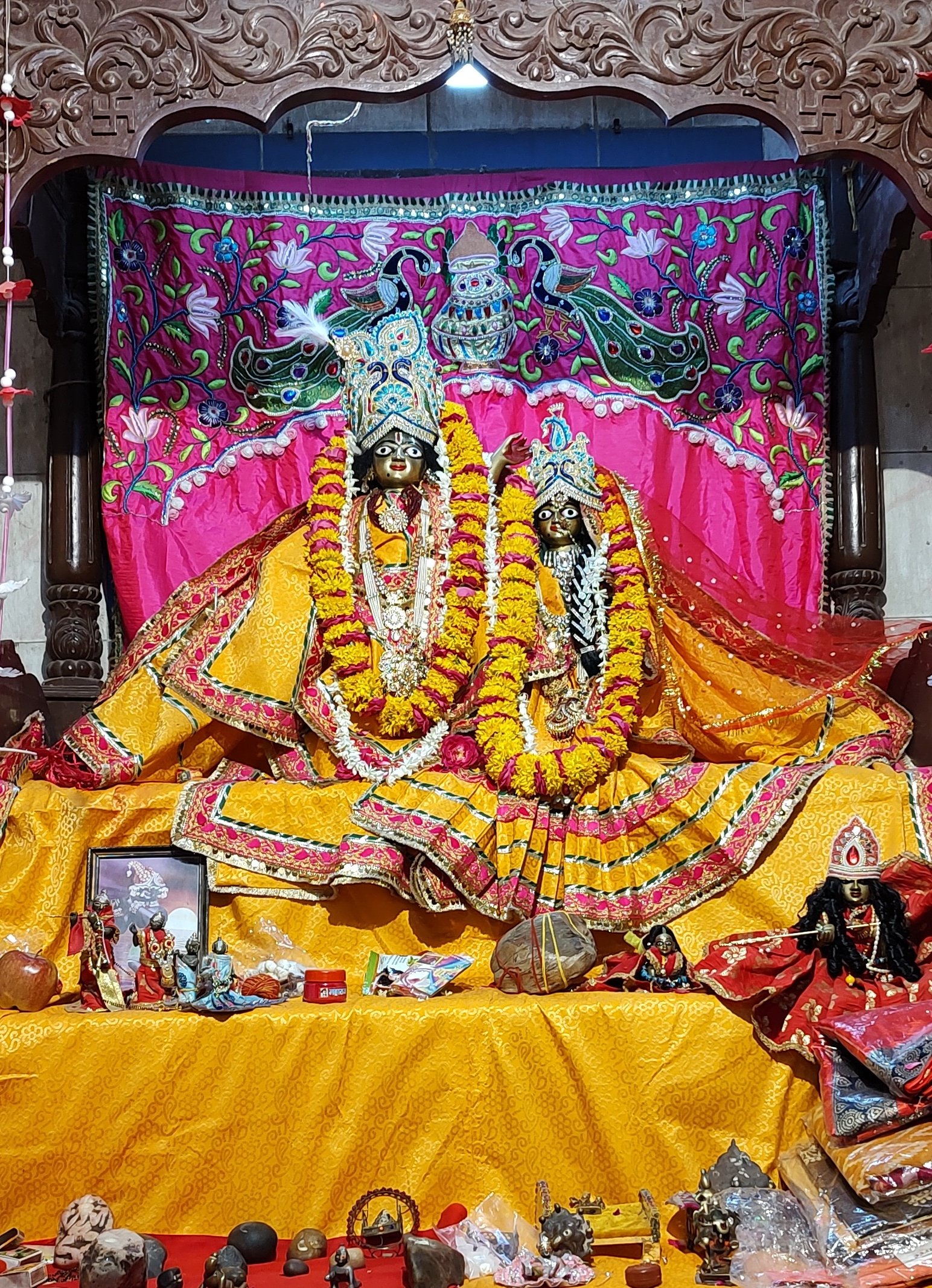
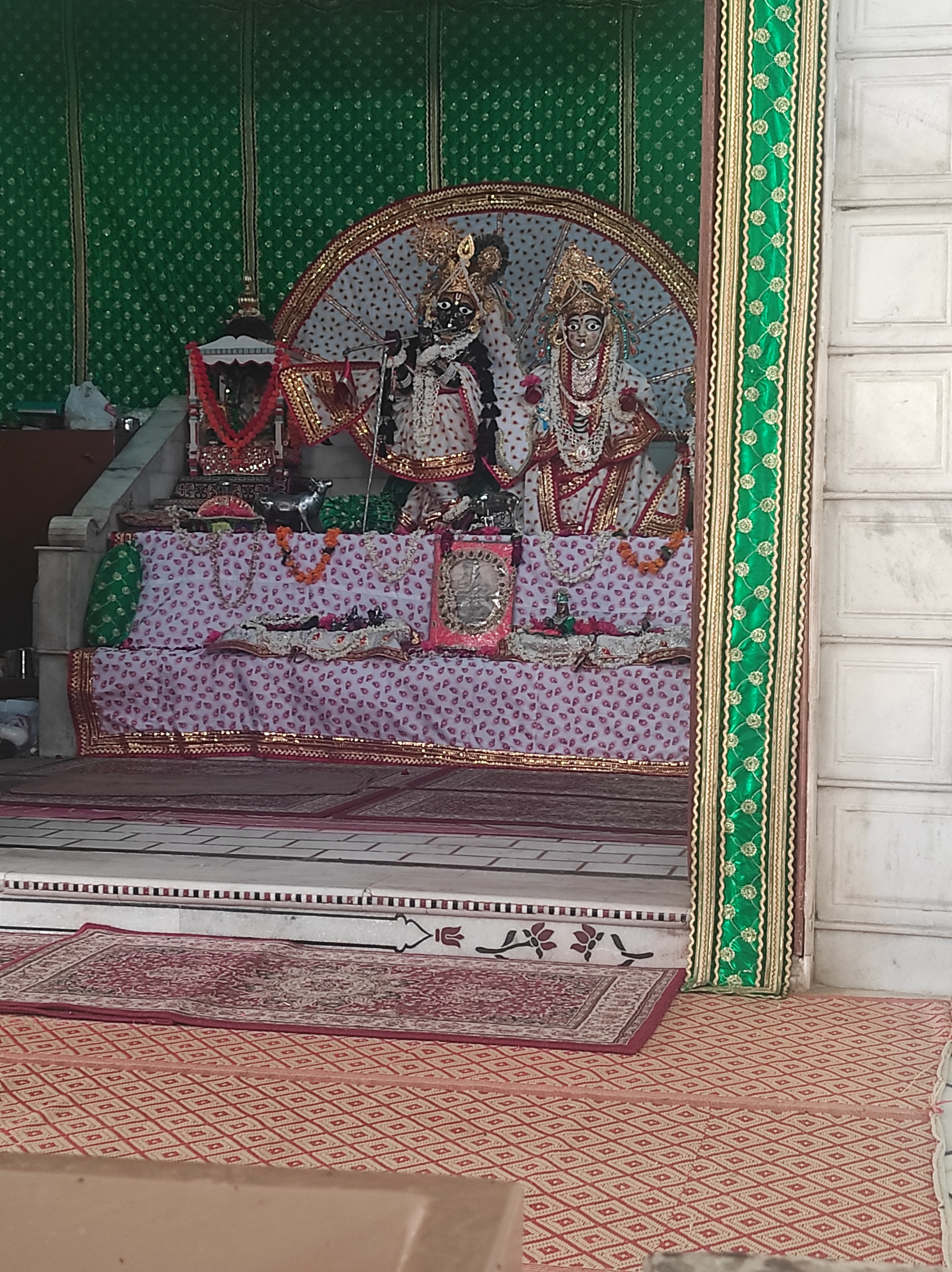
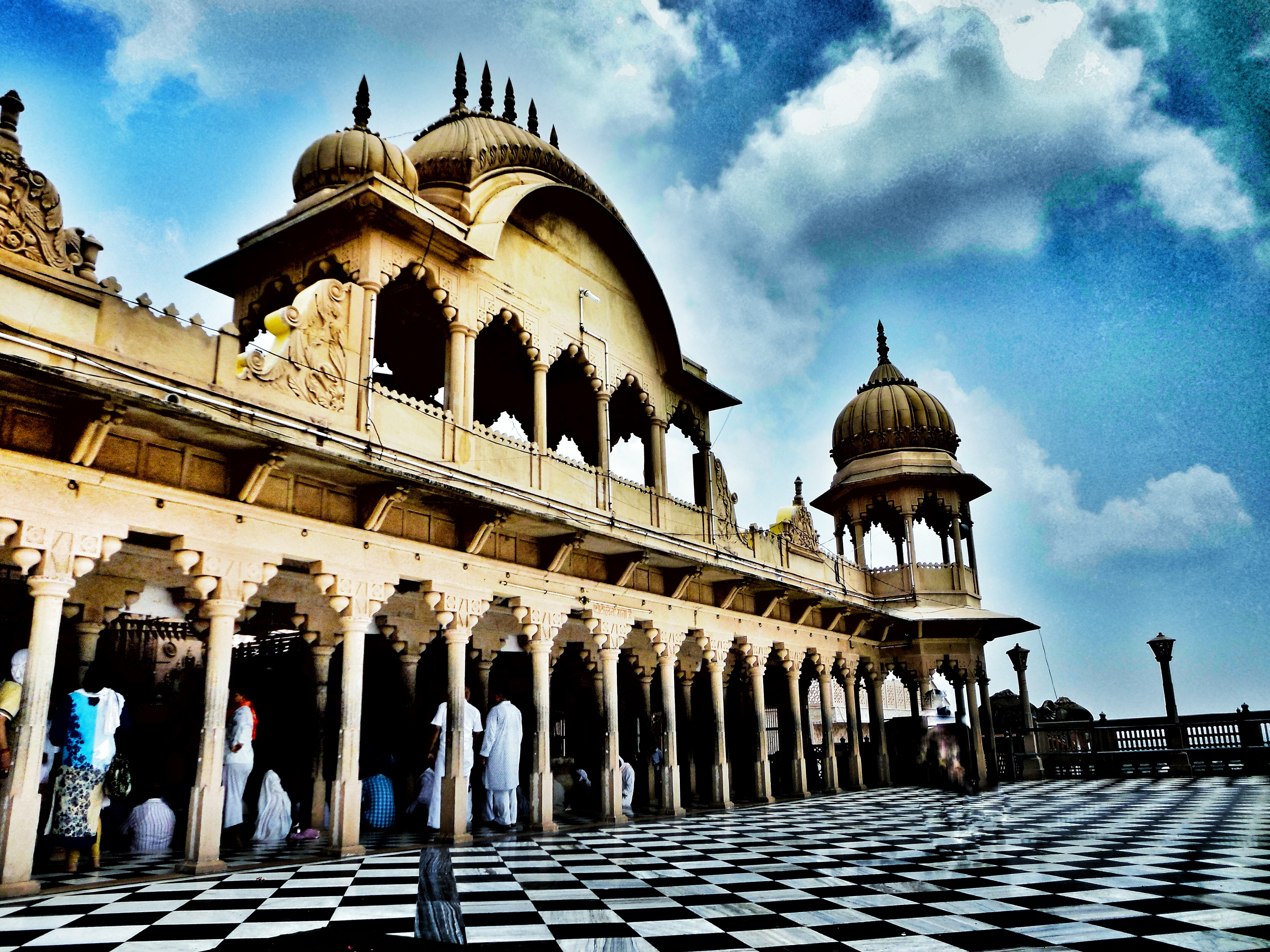
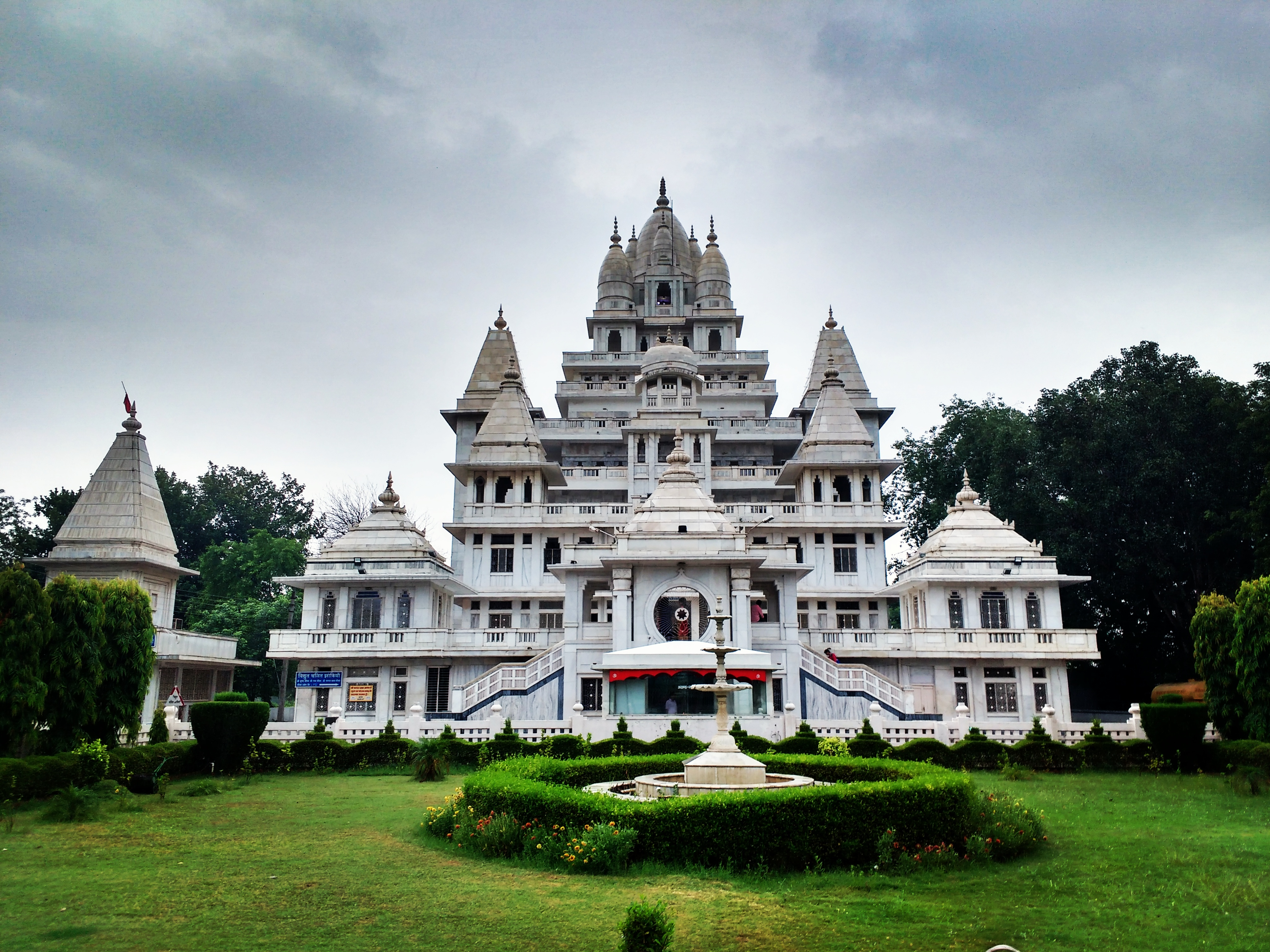
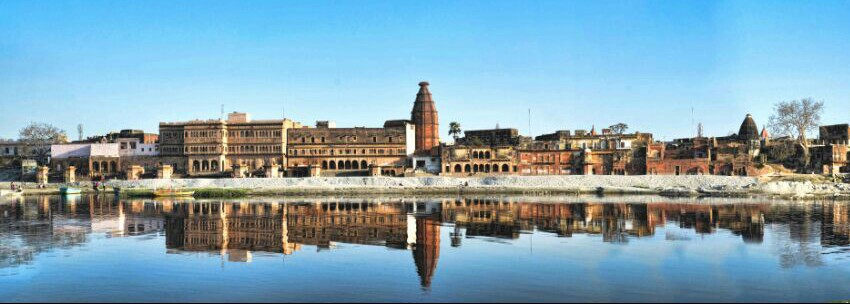
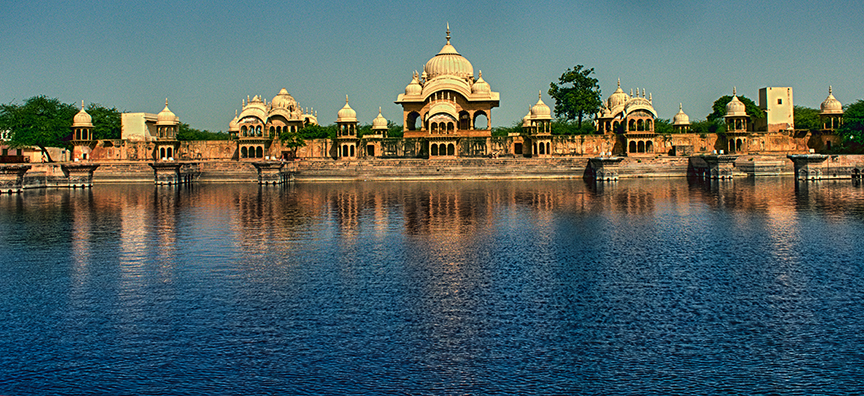
- Clockwise from top: Mansi Ganga in Goverdhan, Radha Kund, Radha Krishna Vivah Sthali, Bhandirvan, Gokula, Barsana, Vrindavan, Yamuna ghat, Kusum Sarovar

- Location of Mathura district in Uttar Pradesh
- Country: India
- State: Uttar Pradesh
- Division: Agra
- Headquarters: Mathura
- Tehsils: 5

Government
  - Lok Sabha constituencies: Mathura

Area
  - Total: 3,333 km^{2} (1,287 sq mi)

Population (2011)
  - Total: 2,547,185
  - Density: 764.2/km^{2} (1,979/sq mi)

Demographics
  - Literacy: 74.65%.

Language
  - Official: Hindi
  - Local: Braj Bhasha
- Time zone: UTC+05:30 (IST)
- Website: mathura.nic.in

Mathura district (Hindi pronunciation: [mət̪ʰʊɾaː]), situated along the banks of the river Yamuna, is a district of Uttar Pradesh state of north-central India. The historic city of Mathura is the district headquarters. Mathura district is home to many important sites associated with goddess Radha and Lord Krishna, who according to legend, was born in Mathura and grew up in the nearby town of Vrindavan. Both cities are some of the most sacred sites in the Vaishnava tradition, making Mathura district an important Hindu pilgrimage centre.

The District is part of Agra division. Total area of Mathura district is 3340 sq. km. There are 5 tehsils in Mathura district.

- Mathura
- Govardhan
- Chhata
- Mant
- Mahavan. Mathura is bounded on the northeast by Aligarh district, on the southeast by Hathras district, on the south by Agra district, and on the west by Rajasthan and northwest by Haryana state.

== History ==
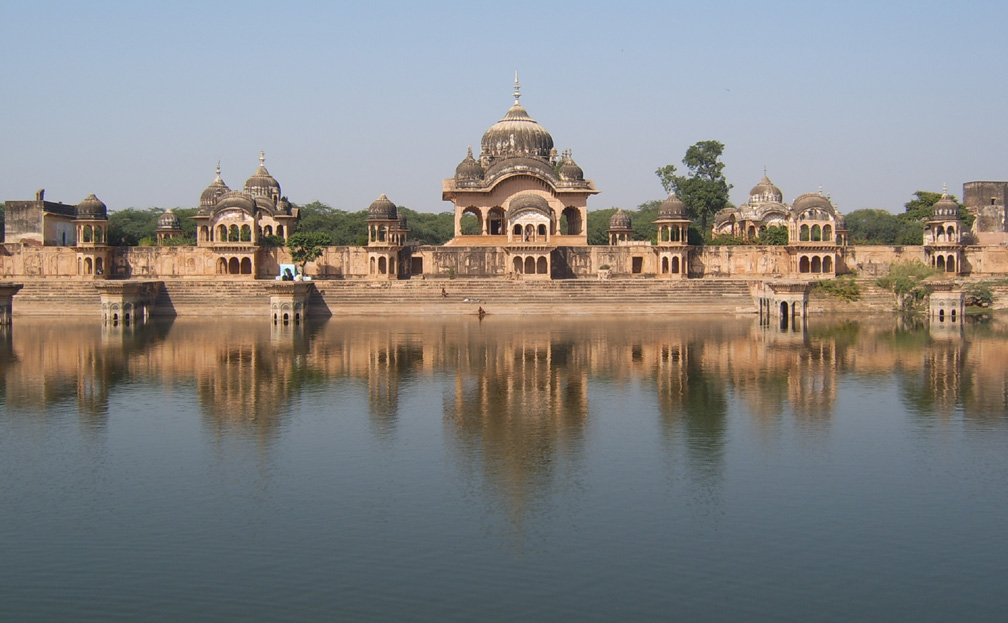
Kusum Sarovar

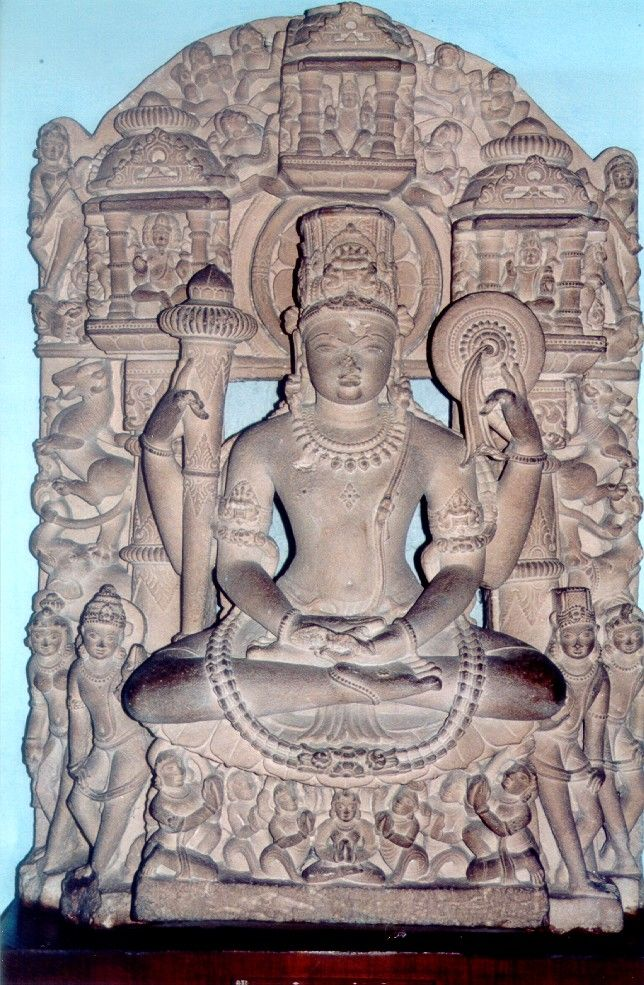
Vishnu with ayudhapurushas, Mathura, India

Mathura has an ancient history. The district lies in the centre of the cultural region of Braj. According to the Archaeological Survey of India plaque at the Mathura Museum, the city is mentioned in the oldest Indian epic, the Ramayana. In the epic, the Ikshvaku prince Shatrughna slays a demon called Lavanasura and claims the land. Afterwards, the place came to be known as Madhuvan as it was thickly wooded, then Madhupura and later Mathura.

In the 6th century BCE Mathura became the capital of the Surasena mahajanapada. The city was later ruled by the Maurya Empire (4th to 2nd centuries BC) and the Shunga Empire dynasty (2nd century BC). It may have come under the control of Indo-Greeks some time between 180 BCE and 100 BC. It then reverted to local rule before being conquered by the Indo-Scythians during the 1st century BC.

Mathuran art and culture reached its zenith under the Kushan dynasty which had Mathura as one of their capitals, the other being Purushapura (Peshawar). The dynasty had kings with the names of Kujula Kadphises, Kanishka, Huvishka and Vasudeva I.

Megasthenes, writing in the early 3rd century BC, mentions Mathura as a great city under the name Μέθορα (Méthora).

The Indo-Scythians (aka Sakas or Shakas) conquered the area of Mathura over Indian kings around 60 BCE.

The district was then ruled by the Gupta Empire and the Vardhas(Harsha) before falling into the hands of local Rajput and Jat rulers.

The findings of ancient stone inscriptions in Magorra, a town 17 kilometres (11 mi) from Mathura, provide historical artefacts giving more details on this era of Mathura. The opening of the 3 line text of these inscriptions are in Brahmi script and were translated as: "In the 116th year of the Greek kings..."

The Indo-Scythian satraps of Mathura are sometimes called the "Northern Satraps", as opposed to the "Western Satraps" ruling in Gujarat and Malwa. After Rajuvula, several successors are known to have ruled as vassals to the Kushans, such as the "Great Satrap" Kharapallana and the "Satrap" Vanaspara, who are known from an inscription discovered in Sarnath, and dated to the 3rd year of Kanishka (c 130 AD), in which they were paying allegiance to the Kushans.

Mathura served as one of the Kushan Empire's two capitals from the first to the third centuries.

Fa Xian mentions the city, as a centre of Buddhism about AD 400; while his successor Xuanzang, who visited the city in 634 AD, which he mentions as Mot'ulo, and said that it contained twenty Buddhist monasteries and five Brahmanical temples. Later, he went east to Thanesar, Jalandhar in the eastern Punjab, before climbing up to visit predominantly Theravada monasteries in the Kullu valley and turning southward again to Bairat and then Mathura, on the Yamuna river.

The city was sacked and many of its temples destroyed by Mahmud of Ghazni in 1018 and again by Sikandar Lodhi, who ruled the Sultanate of Delhi from 1489 to 1517. Sikander Lodhi earned the epithet of 'But Shikan', the 'Destroyer of Hindu deities'.

During Aurangzeb's reign(1658-1707), Mughal religious policies in Mathura became a source of conflict. In 1666, Mughal governor Abdul Nabi Khan removed a railing of Keshavdev temple, which had been patronised by Dara Shikoh. In 1670, Aurangzeb ordered the destruction of the temple and constructed the Shahi Idgah mosque at the same site. These measures took place during a period of unrest in the region during which Abdul Nabi Khan was killed. Historians talk of temple's destruction in context of both Aurangzeb's religious policies and political issues surrounding Mughals in the region surrounding Mathura.

Aurangzeb, built the city's Jama Masjid. The noteworthy fact is that the exact place of birth of Krishna, according to historians, is in the place of worship of the Hindus, though the mosque was built near the birthplace of Krishna. The bigger Krishna shrine, better known as Shree Krishna Janambhumi is a few metres away from birthplace of Krishna. It was built by Jugal Kishore Birla in 1954.

== Demographics ==
Historical population
Year	Pop.	±% p.a.
1901	651,619	—
1911	560,620	−1.49%
1921	528,677	−0.58%
1931	570,211	+0.76%
1941	688,801	+1.91%
1951	774,567	+1.18%
1961	911,685	+1.64%
1971	1,099,356	+1.89%
1981	1,330,963	+1.93%
1991	1,650,653	+2.18%
2001	2,074,516	+2.31%
2011	2,547,184	+2.07%

According to the 2011 census Mathura district has a population of 2,547,184, roughly equal to the nation of Kuwait or the US state of Nevada. This gives it a ranking of 167th in India (out of a total of 640). The district has a population density of 761 inhabitants per square kilometre (1,970/sq mi). Its population growth rate over the decade 2001-2011 was 22.53%. Mathura has a sex ratio of 858 females for every 1000 males, and a literacy rate of 72.65%. 29.68% of the population lived in urban areas. Scheduled Castes made up 19.89% of the population.

The district has about 1,600,000 voters, including 3,00,000 Jat people, 2,50,000 Thakur, 1,75,000 Brahmin. Mathura receives a large number of daily visitors besides pilgrims who stay for an average of 3 days. Mathura's urban area's floating population on normal days is between 100,000 and 125,000 per day, whereas on festive and auspicious days it is over twice the population of urban area.

Religions in Mathura district (2011)
Religion	Percent
Hinduism	90.72%
Islam	8.52%
Other or not stated	0.76%
Distribution of religions

The majority of people in Mathura are Hindus. Muslims are equally divided between rural and urban areas while the Hindu population is mainly rural.

=== Language ===
Languages of Mathura district (2011)
1. Hindi (75.2%)
2. Braj Bhasha (22.2%)
3. Urdu (0.81%)
4. Others (1.74%)

At the time of the 2011 Census of India, 75.20% of the population in the district spoke Hindi, 22.25% Braj and 0.81% Urdu as their first language.

== Geography and climate ==
Mathura is located at 27.28°N 77.41°E. It has an average elevation of 174 metres (570 feet). The climate of Mathura is tropical extreme with very hot summers with temperatures rising beyond 44 °C, and cold and foggy winters with the temperature dipping to 5 °C. The average rainfall is 793 mm, received mostly during the monsoons from July to September.

== Administration ==
Region of Mathura was added to British territory in 1803 A.D. Till 1832 A.D, when Mathura was recognised as district, the region was partly administered from Agra and partly from Sadabad.

=== Strategic importance ===
Mathura is the home for Indian I Corps (Strike Formation) within the Indian Army's Central Command, hosting Strike I Corps headquarters in a large classified area in the outskirts of the city known as Mathura Cantonment (Central Command itself has its headquarters at Lucknow). It hosts Strike Infantry units, Air Defence units, Armoured Divisions, Engineer brigades, Artillery Units and classified units of Strategic Nuclear Command. Corps I is primarily responsible for western borders of India. In 2007 during Exercise Ashwamedha, all the armoured, artillery and infantry divisions performed a simulation of an overall NBC (nuclear-chemical-biological) environment. The aim was to show operational ability in high intensity, short duration and 'sudden' battles.

=== Politics ===
Mathura is governed by a number of bodies, the most important being the Mathura Nagar Nigam (Municipal Corporation), which is responsible for the master planning of the city. Now the responsibilities of planning of the city as well as urban areas ( including nagar nigam ) handed over to MATHURA-VRINDAVAN DEVELOPMENT AUTHORITY (in brief- "M V D A"). The Authority established in 1977.

Mathura Lok Sabha constituency elects MP from this district. In 2019 Hema Malini (BJP) won the election.

=== Healthcare ===
Health care facilities in Mathura are provided by Central, State and Local government facilities, besides numerous private providers. As per the recent District Level Household and Facility Survey (DLHS-3) 2007 – 2008, only 33% of currently married women are using a modern method of contraception, which is lower than the state average of 34.8%. Usage of any modern method, though, is higher in Mathura (29.4%) in comparison to the state's average of 26.7%. The percentage of IUD, Pill and Condom usage is again below the state average. The DLHS 3 estimates unmet Family Planning need in Mathura at 38.9%: 9.8% unmet need for spacing methods and 29.1% unmet need for limiting methods. The percentage of birth of order 3 and above is quite high at 46.9%. Mathura has lesser percentage of girls marrying before 18 years of age, which is 31.6% in comparison with the state average of 33.1%. But the most alarming statistic is that of mothers who had at least 3 antenatal care visits during the last pregnancy, which is only 21% as compared to the state average of 64.4%.

== Economy and industry ==
One of the contributors in the economy of Uttar Pradesh are Mathura Industries. Mathura Refinery located in the city is one of the biggest oil refineries of Asia. This oil refinery of the Indian Oil Corporation is a technologically advanced oil refinery. Mathura Refinery is the first in Asia and third in the world to receive the coveted ISO-14001 certification for Environment Management System in 1996.

Textile printing industry that includes both sari-printing and fabric dying and silver ornaments manufacturing are major industrial contributors to the region. The majority of these silver ornaments include silver jewellery and statues for gods and goddesses, including Krishna. Apart from these other industries are water tap manufacturing units and other decorative and household items. Mathura also is a big centre for production of cotton materials; prominent among them being pure white bleached cotton saris for women and dhotis for men, and cotton niwar tapes for beds.

Mathura is also a hub for production of milk based sweet meats, prominent among them being Brajvasi pedas and burfis. Renowned as “The place where rivers of milk flowed,” Mathura currently has a large industry of milk trading, where customers can buy any amount of fresh milk. The process is different to typical milk buying, however, in that a blackboard is posted and updated with real-time price changes for the different sellers in the area.

== Education ==
- GLA University
- R.K. Group of Institutions (including Rajiv Academy For Technology Management, Rajiv Academy For Teacher's Education, Rajiv Academy For Pharmacy, K.D. Dental College Hospital, Rajiv International School, etc.)
- BSA College of engineering and technology
- Excel Institute of Management Technology (has been accorded as status of university).

Mathura is home to the Uttar Pradesh Pandit Deen Dayal Upadhyaya Veterinary University, the first of its kind in the state and the fourth in the country to be made independent veterinary universities. The University is located on the Mathura-Agra road, about 5 kilometres (3.1 mi) from Mathura.

Many schools like Parmeshwari Devi Dhanuka, Hanuman Prashad Dhanuka, Kanha Makhan Public School, Kanha Makhan Millenium School, Amarnath Vidya Ashram, Sacred Heart, Mathura, St. Dominics, Ramanlal Shorawala, SRBS International School, Braj shiksha sadan school and Rajiv International School are also located here.

== Culture and religion ==
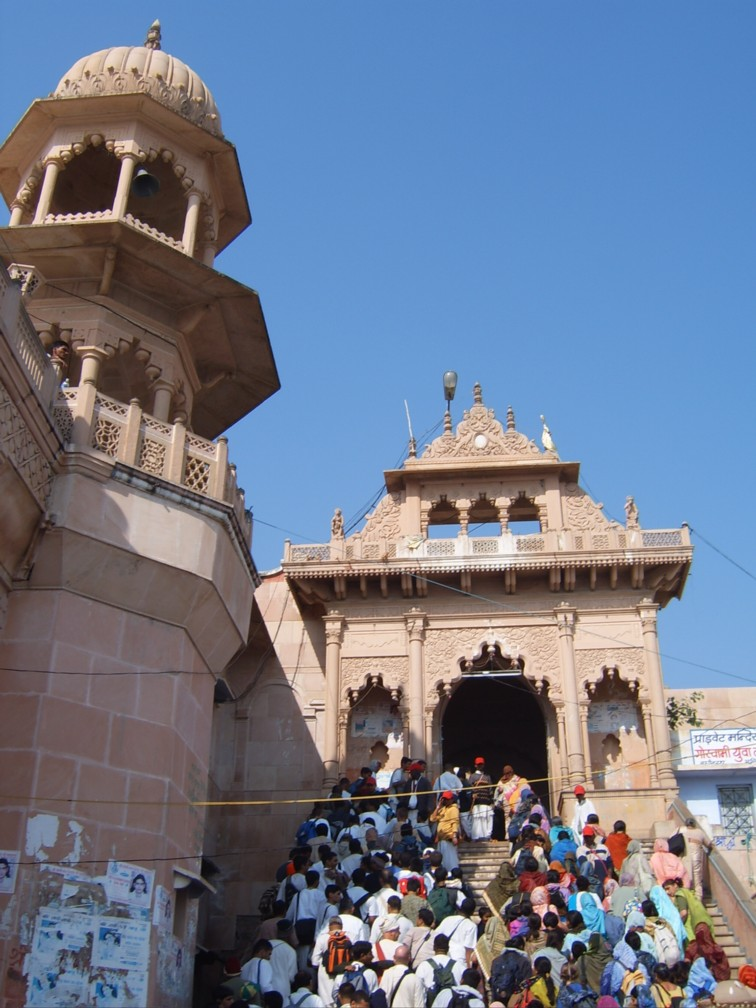
Radha Rani Temple in Barsana, near Mathura, dedicated to the worship of Radha and Krishna

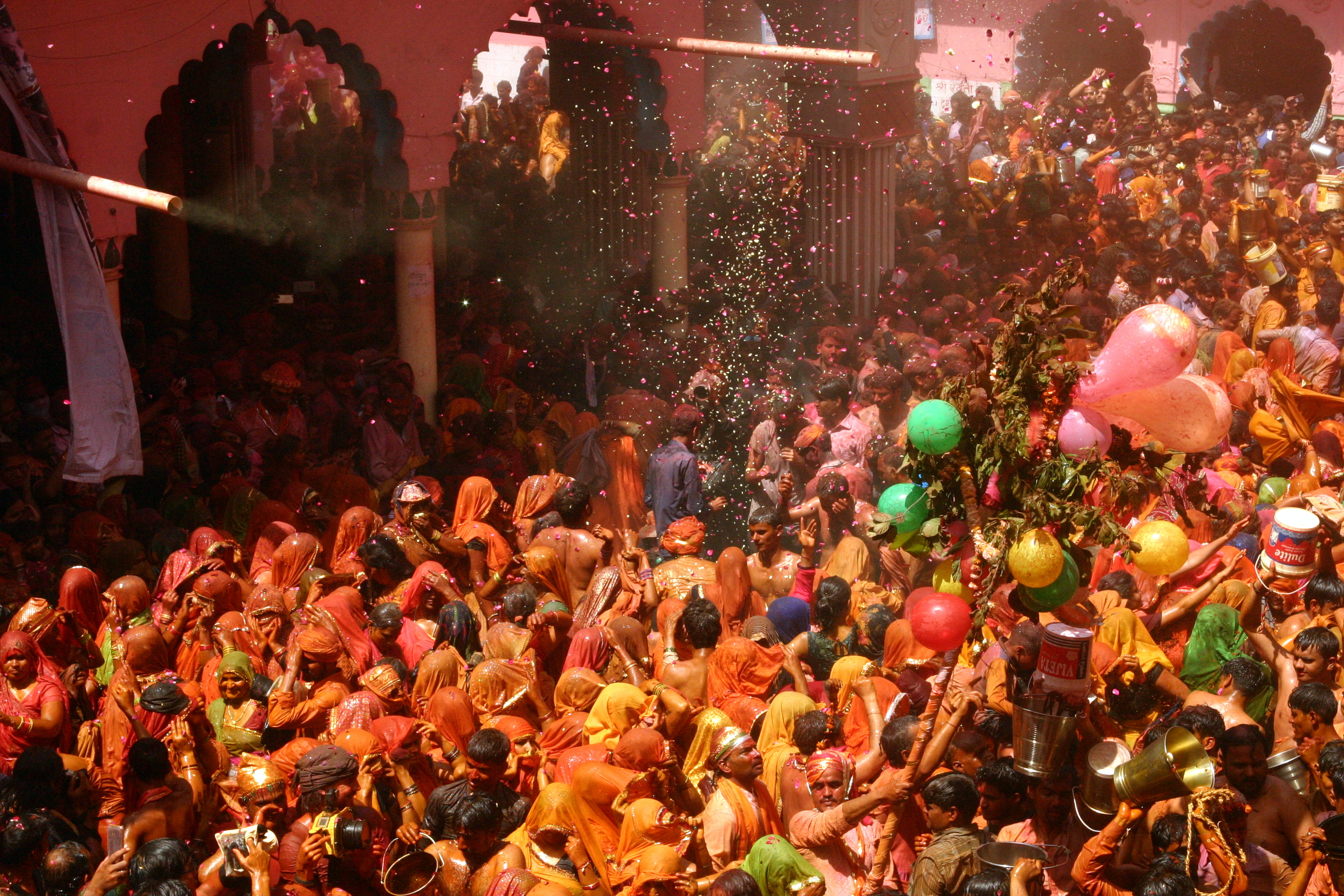
People drenched in colour during Holi celebration in Mathura

=== Art ===
Mathura School of Art, style of Buddhist visual art that flourished in the Mathura, from the 2nd century bc to the 12th century A.D; its most distinctive contributions were made during the Kushan and Gupta periods (1st–6th century A.d). Images in the mottled red sandstone from the nearby Sīkri quarries are found widely distributed over north central India, attesting to Mathurā's importance as an exporter of sculpture. The Mathura School images are related to the earlier yakṣa (male nature deity) figures, a resemblance particularly evident in the colossal standing Buddha images of the early Kushān period. In these, and in the more representative seated Buddhas, the overall effect is one of enormous energy. The shoulders are broad, the chest swells, and the legs are firmly planted with feet spaced apart.

These days, around 1,000 craftsmen are involved in making wall hangings at Holi gate and Chowk Bazaar in the pilgrim town of Mathura. These wall hangings delve on religious themes and mostly revolve around Radha and Krishna seated on a swing, Krishna playing flute along with Radha and Gopis, Krishna with herds of cattle, Goddess Saraswati, Vaishno Devi and Vishnu. Wall hangings have the gods and goddesses in highly embellished form, marking the highpoints of the Mathura School of Paintings. Once the brush work is over, the figures are adorned with colourful stars and mica pieces to make them attractive. One of the most brilliant art works of Mathura School of Paintings is Goddess Lakshmi in the midst of lotus flowers.

== Religion ==
Mathura is one of the seven most holy places for Hindus in India.

Ayodhyā Mathurā Māyā Kāsi Kāñchī Avantikā I

Purī Dvārāvatī chaiva saptaitā moksadāyikāh II

- Garuḍa Purāṇa I XVI .14

A Kṣetra is a sacred ground, a field of active power, a place where Moksha, final release can be obtained. The Garuda Purana enumerates seven cities as giver of Moksha, They are Ayodhya, Mathura, Māyā, Kāsi, Kāñchī, Avantikā, Puri and Dvārāvatī.

== Tourism ==
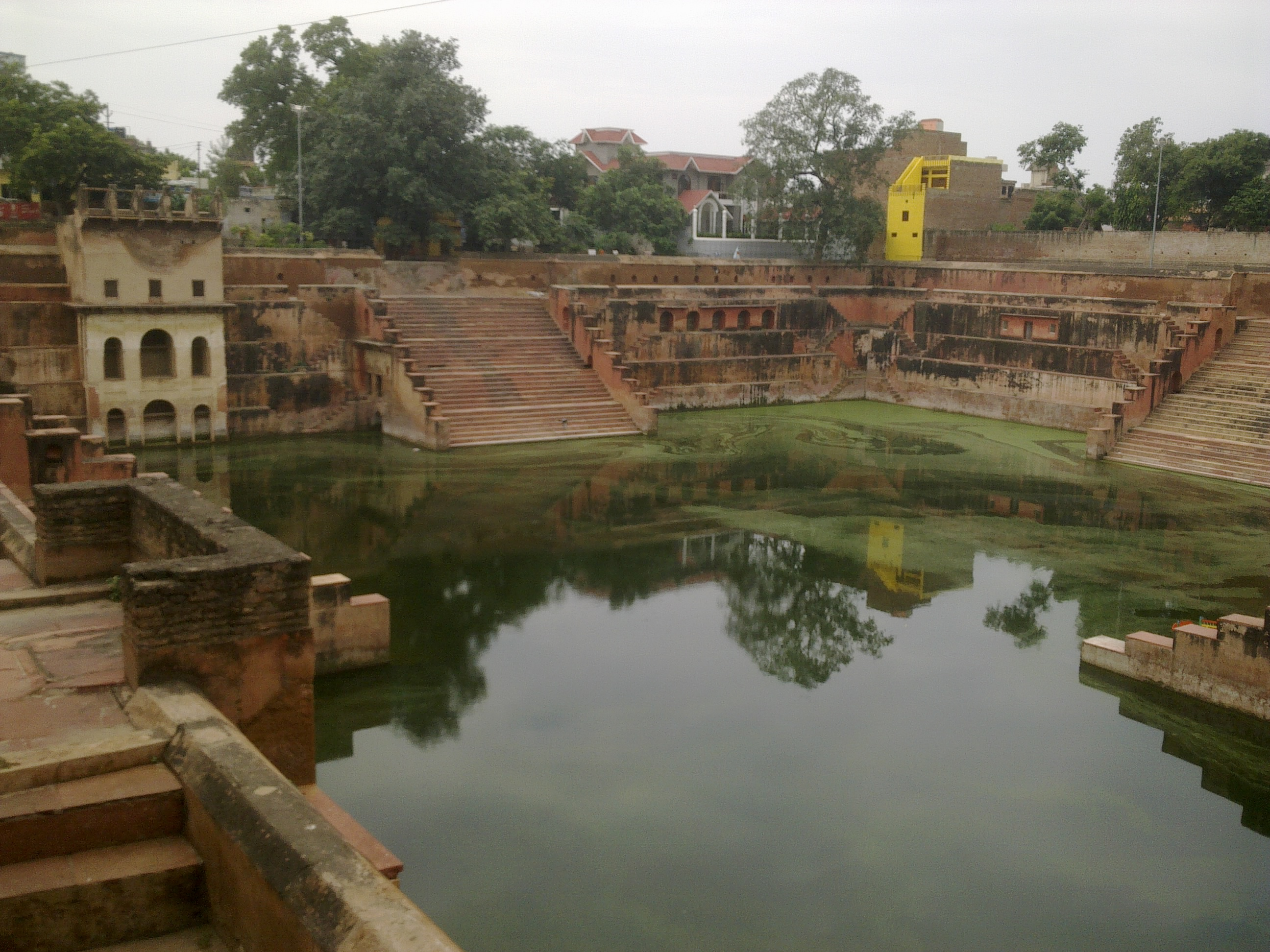
According to Hindu mythology, Potra Kund (water body) was used to clean Krishna's baby clothes [Potre]. Potra Kund temple tank near Krishna Janmabhoomi

=== Temples ===
Shri Krishna Janmbhoomi is a Hindu temple complex located in heart of city of Mathura. Hindus consider it as one of the most sacred place as they believe that the temple stands on the same place where ancient Hindu god Krishna was born. The complex have a Keshavdev temple where spiritual environment could be felt during morning prayer (Mangla Aarti). The temple complex have a museum, where numerous articles excavated from the site related to story of Sri Krishna’a birth are displayed.

Dwarkadheesh Temple, built in 1814, is a temple near the banks of Yamuna river in Mathura city. This temple is managed by followers of Vallabhacarya. The temple is fairly interesting architecturally. People engaged in Bhajan Kirtan inside temple before daily morning prayer (Mangla Aarti gives an impression of festival and celebration.

Gita Mandir is situated at a distance of nearly five kilometres from Mathura Junction (in way of Vrindaban from Matura city) is an attraction of Mathura. The mandir was built by Birla, one of the leading industrial powers of India. The architecture of the temple attracts tourists from all over India. The whole of Gita, the sacred book of the Hindus, is inscribed on the temple. Carvings and paintings also enhance the temple. There is an image of Krishna is present in the sanctum of the Mandir.

Rangaji Temple, built in 1851 is dedicated to Ranganatha or Rangaji depicted as Vishnu in his sheshashayi pose, resting on the coils of the sacred Shesha-nag. The temple built in the Dravidian style has a tall gopuram (gateway) of six storeys and a gold - plated Dhwaja stambha, 50 feet high. A water tank and a picturesque garden lie within the temple enclosure. The annual festival of Jal Vihar of the presiding deity is performed with great pomp and splendour at the tank. The temple is also known for its `Brahmotsdav' celebration during the month of Chaitra (March - April), more popularly known as the `Rath ka Mela'. The ten-day-long celebrations are marked by the pulling of the rath (the chariot car) by the devotees from the temple to the adjoining gardens.

Jugal Kishor Temple was built in the 17th century after Emperor Akbar's visit to Vridaban in the year 1570, he ordered four temples to be built by the Gaudya Vaisnavas, which were Madana-mohana, Govindaji, Gopinatha and Jugal Kisore. The temple is located near Kesi Ghat in Vrindaban and also called as Kesi temple.

Radharaman Temple is another name of ancient Hindu god Krishna which means "one who gives pleasure to Radha". The seva puja of Radharamana was established in 1542, after the Deity self-manifested from a saligram-sila. Also kept in this temple is the wooden sitting place (hoki) and shawl (chaddar) or Chaitanya, that he gave as a gift to Gopala Bhatta Gosvami who built the temple. There is no deity of Radharani in this temple, but a crown is kept next to Krishna signifying her presence.

Jaipur Temple which was built by Sawai Madhav Singh, the Maharaja of Jaipur in 1917, is a richly embellished and opulent temple located in Vrindaban. The fine hand - carved sandstone is of unparalleled workmanship. The temple is dedicated to Radha Madhav.

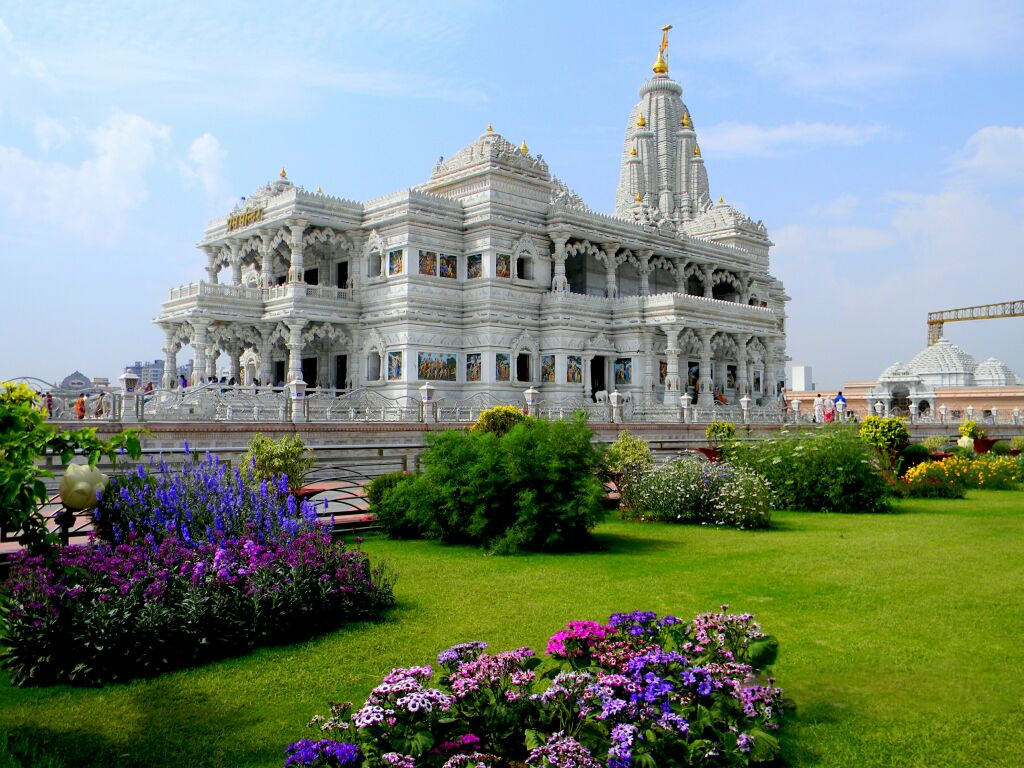
Prem Mandir, Vrindavan

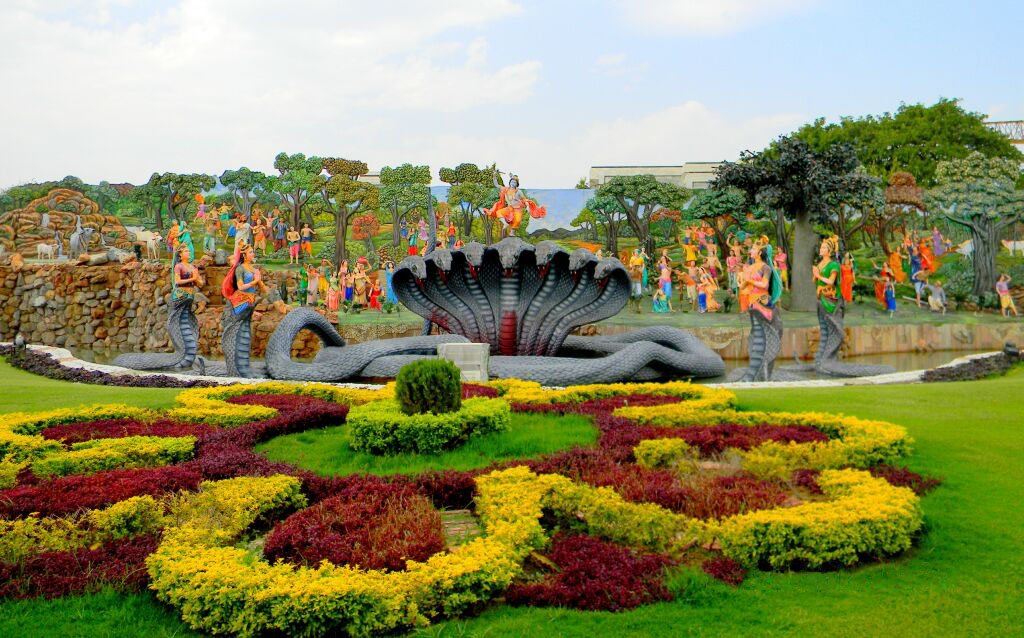
Kaliya Mardan, Prem Mandir, Vrindavan

Shahji Temple, another temple at Vrindavan, was designed and built in 1876 by a wealthy jeweller, Shah Kundan Lal of Lucknow. The deities at the temple are popularly known as the Chhote Radha Raman. Noted for its architecture and marble sculpture, the temple has twelve spiral columns each 15 feet high. The `Basanti Kamra' - the darbar hall is famed for its Belgian glass chandeliers and fine paintings.

Vrindavan Chandrodaya Mandir is the world's tallest temple under-construction at Mathura. At cost of ₹300 crore (US$32 million) it will be one of the most expensively built temple in world by ISKCON.

Prem Mandir is a religious and spiritual complex situated on a 54-acre site on the outskirts of Vrindavan, is one of the newest temples dedicated to Radha Krishna. The temple structure was established by spiritual guru Kripalu Maharaj. The main structure of temple is made up of white marble. Idols of Radha Krishna and Sita Rama are present on the ground floor and first floor respectively. The whole premises of temple is covered with different art works depicting the pastimes of Radha Krishna.

Sri Vrindavan-Chandra Mandir (HKM Vrindavan), located in Vrindavan, is a replica of that supreme Goloka Vrindavana in the spiritual sky. It was inaugurated in 2006 on the most auspicious day of Sri Rama Navami day. The temple is housed in an ultra-modern geodesic structure with a traditional gopuram based on khajuraho style of architecture, greeting pilgrims at the entrance. The major festivals of the temple are Sri Krishna Janmashtami, Sri Radhashtami, Kartik Fest (7-day festival during Govardhan Puja time) and Gaura Purnima. Grand abhishekas are performed for Sri Sri Radha Vrindavan-chandra during festivals such as Radhashtami and Janmashtami.

Shree Radha Ras Bihari Ashta Sakhi Temple: In Vrindavan, the "Lila Sthan" (the place of the divine passion play) of Krishna, lies the temple that is a must visit destination for devotees completing the 84 kosh Vraj Parikrama Yatra. The temple is centuries old and is the first Indian temple that is dedicated to the divine couple and their Ashta Sakhi's - the eight "companions" of Radha who were intimately involved in her love play with the Krishna. The Ashta Sakhis are mentioned in the ancient texts of Puranas and the Bhagavata Purana. The temple is called Shree Radha Ras Bihari Ashta Sakhi Mandir and it is home to the divine Rasa Lila of Krishna and Radharani. It is located in close proximity to the Banke Bihari Temple. Legend has it that the Shree Radha Rasa Behari Ashta Sakhi Mandir is one of the two places in Mathura, Vrindavan where the Krishna actually indulges in the Rasa Lila with his beloved Radha and her sakhis. On these nights, devotees have reported hearing the sound of the anklets, beating in tune to a divine melody.

Govind Deo Temple was once a seven storeyed structure built in the form of a Greek cross. It is said that the Emperor Akbar donated some of the red sandstone that had been brought for the Red Fort at Agra, for the construction of this temple. Built at the astronomical cost of one crore rupees in 1590 by his general Man Singh, the temple combines western, Hindu and Muslim architectural elements in its structure.

Krishna-Balaram Mandir is a Gaudiya Vaishnava temple in the holy city of Vrindavan. It is one of the main ISKCON temples in India and internationally. Krishna-Balaram Mandir was built in 1975 on the orders of Bhaktivedanta Swami Prabhupada, the founder-acharya of the International Society for Krishna Consciousness (ISKCON).

Shri Jambuswami Digambara Jain Mandir is an important religious places for the Jains as they believe the last Kevali Jambuswami attained nirvana from this place called Mathura Chaurasi.

Other important temple sites include - Radha Madanmohan Temple, Radha Damodar Temple, Radha Vallabh Temple, Radharani Temple, Nidhivan, Radha Krishna Vivah sthali, Bhandirvan.

=== Ghat ===
Vishram Ghat is a ghat, a bath and worship place, on the banks of river Yamuna. It is the main ghat of Mathura city and is central to 25 other ghats. The traditional parikrama starts and ends at Vishram Ghat. Krishna is said to have rested at this place after killing Kansa.

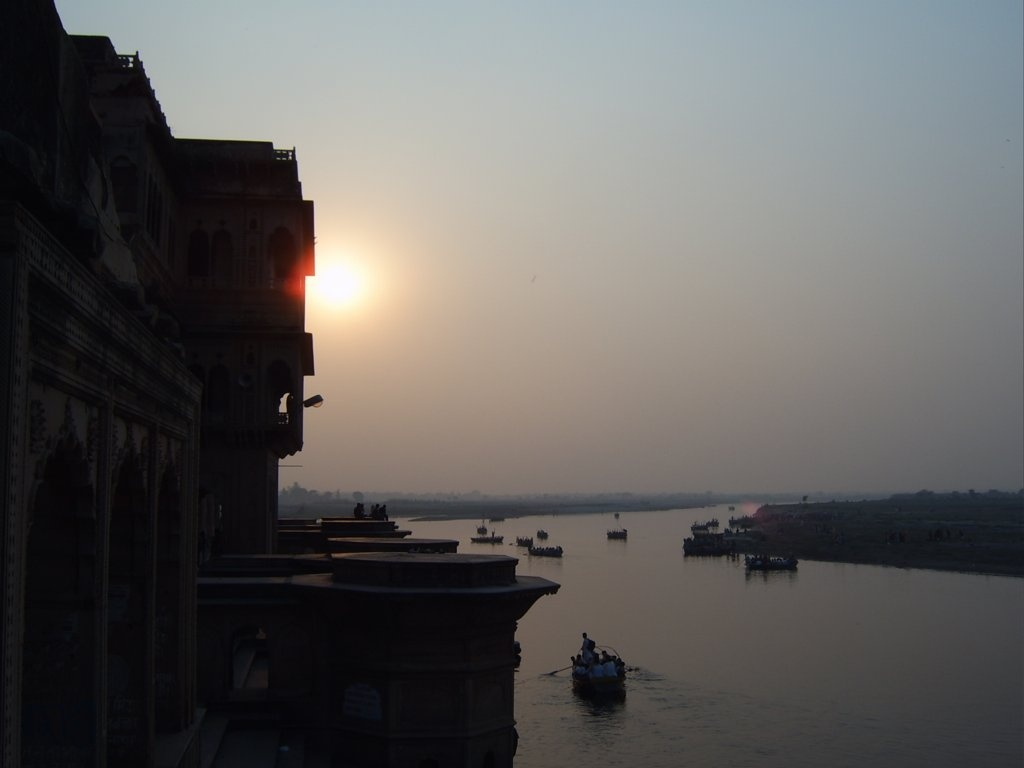
Kesi Ghat on the Yamuna river. The word "Radha" is repeatedly written on the side in the Devanagari alphabet. In Hindu mythology Kesi ghat is believed to be the same place where Hindu god Krishna killed the Kesi demon who appeared in the form of a gigantic horse and then took his bath in this very same ghat. This is also bathing place in Vrindavana. An arati to Yamuna Devi is held here every evening.

Some notable places in Mathura District:

- Mathura - the town
- Gokul
- Mahawan
- Baldev
- Raya
- Vrindaban
- Goverdhan
- Barsana
- Nandgaon
- Kosi Kalan
- Farah
- Mant
- Nauhajhil
- Bajna
- Surir
- Bhidauni
- Akos

== Religious festivals ==
=== Krishna Janmashtami ===
Krishna Janmashtami is celebrated on the eighth day (Ashtami) of the Krishna Paksha (dark fortnight) of the month of Shraavana (August–September) in the Hindu calendar. Rasa lila dramatic enactments of the life of Krishna, are a special feature in Mathura. There is a huge arati at 12 midnight in temples all over Vrindavana.

=== Radhashtami ===
Radhashtami is a Hindu festival commemorating the appearance of Radha, also known as Radharani. It is observed on the eighth day (Ashtami) of the bright fortnight (Shukla Paksha) in the Hindu lunar month of Bhadrapada, which generally falls in August or September, approximately 15 days after Janmashtami, the festival marking the birth of Krishna.

Radhashtami is widely observed in the Mathura region of Uttar Pradesh, particularly in Barsana, which is traditionally associated with Radha. Celebrations at the Radha Rani Temple in Barsana include devotional singing (kirtan) on the preceding night, followed by Mangala Aarti in the early morning. The occasion also attracts pilgrims and devotees from different parts of India.

=== Guru Purnima ===
Guru Purnima is a Hindu festival dedicated to spiritual and academic teachers. This festival takes place in the month of Asadha (June–July). It is customary to worship the spiritual master on this day. Millions of people visit Mathura on Guru Purnima because of the presence of thousands of spiritual Gurus in Mathura. On this day many devotees gather at Manasi Ganga and do Govardhana parikrama.

=== Braj Parikrama ===
Braj Parikrama is a pilgrimage of all the places in Braj that associated with Krishna, is undertaken. Traditionally, the Chaurasi kos (84 kos) pilgrimage of Braj Mandal, with its 12 vanas (forests), 24 upvanas (groves), sacred hill Govardhan, divine River Yamuna and numerous holy places along its banks, is undertaken annually by lakhs of devotees from all over the country. The Yatra extends to Kotban to the north of Mathura, to Nandgaon, Barsana and the Govardhan Hill to the west and South-west of the city and to the banks of the Yamuna to the east, where the Baldeo Temple is located. Colourful melas and performances of the rasalila (a depiction of the exploits of Krishna) in Braj Parikrama are distinctive to rainy month of Bhadon, the month when the Krishna was born, is a time of colourful celebrations.

=== Vasant Panchmi ===
Vasant Panchami, a festival that marks the commencement of spring season, is widely celebrated in Mathura. The festival marks the beginning of celebrations of Holi in Mathura. Special religious programs are organised in other temples of across the district, like in Bankey Bihari Temple of Vrindavan pilgrims celebrate the occasion by tossing rose powder.

=== Lathmar Holi ===
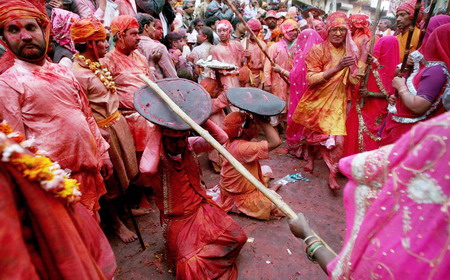
In Barsana town in Mathura District, during Lathmar Holi women have the option to playfully hit men who save themselves with shields; for the day, men are culturally expected to accept whatever women dish out to them. This ritual is called Lath Mar Holi.

Lathmar Holi is a local celebration of the Hindu festival of Holi. It takes place well before the actual Holi in the town of Barsana. The name means "that Holi in which [people] hit with sticks". In the sprawling compound of the Radha Rani temple in Barsana, thousands gather to witness the Lath mar Holi when women beat up men with sticks (laṭh) as those on the sidelines become hysterical, sing Holi Songs and shout Sri Radhey or Sri Krishna.

=== Jal Jhulan ===
This is the swing festival at the Ranganatha temple. At night the temple tank is lit up. This festival is on the 11th day of the month of Bhadra (Aug-Sept).

=== Jhulan Yatra Mahotsava ===
This festival lasts for 13 days. It starts on the Tritya (third day) of the bright fortnight of Sravana (July-Aug) and lasts until the full moon night of the month. During this festival the Radha-Krishna Deities in the temples are swung on a swing. This is one of the biggest festivals of the year and Vrindavana is very crowded at this time. Often the swings are gold and silver. Some of the main temples that this festival is celebrated at are the Banke Bihari Temple and the Radha-Raman Temple in Vrindavana, the Dwarkadheesh temple in Mathura, and the Radha Rani Temple in Barsana.

== Transport ==
Mathura is on the main lines of the Central Railways and is connected with all the important cities of Uttar Pradesh and India such as Delhi, Agra, Lucknow, Mumbai, Jaipur, Gwalior, Kolkata, Hyderabad and Chennai. The Nearest airport is Kheria (Agra), 62 km away from Mathura. Mathura is also well connected by motorable roads to important cities in the region.

== Villages ==
- Bhavanpura
- Bhidauni
- Kiloni
- Nagla-Sanja
- Paigaon
- Patloni
- Tarauli
- Bahadin

== See also ==
- Vrindaban Road railway station
- Vrindavan railway station
- Ajhai railway station
