= Baldeo =

- Town
- Nickname: Dauji
- Location in Uttar Pradesh, India
- Coordinates: 27.42°N 77.82°E
- Country: India
- State: Uttar Pradesh
- District: Mathura
- Elevation: 176 m (577 ft)

Population (2001)
  - Total: 9,695

Languages
  - Official: Hindi
  - Native: Braj Bhasha dialect
- Time zone: UTC+5:30 (IST)
- Postal code: 281301
- Website: uttarpradesh.gov.in/en/details/baldeo/310037003300

Baldeo is a town and a nagar panchayat in Mathura district in the state of Uttar Pradesh, India.

== History ==
Baldeo town of Mathura district, which is about a 25 km from Mathura. Mathura to reach here by bus, taxi arrangements etc. According to Hindu mythology, Baldeo is the place where Lord Krishna's elder brother named 'Baldeo' use to rule. It is also known as 'Dauji' in the local areas around mathura as the other name of Lord Baldeo was 'Dau Ji maharaj'. Additionally, there is a famous temple in Baldeo of 'Dau Ji Maharaj', where there is a stone statue of him with his wife Revati situated. The idol of Dauji was installed by the grandson of Lord Krishna, Vajranabha. But during the time of Arabic Sultans, the temple was destroyed and the idol lost over a period of time. Afterwards, in Mughal era 480 years ago, the grandson of Mahaprabhu shrimad Vallabhacharya, and the 4th son of Vitthalanatha gusaiji, Goswami Gokulnathji re-installed the deity on Purnima of shukla paksha in Magsheer and began the worship and rituals again. Later he gave the seva to a brahmin named keshav pandey, whoes lineage of pandey is today also performing internal seva of the mandir.

== Geography ==
Baldeo is located at 27.42°N 77.82°E. It has an average elevation of 176 metres (577 feet). It is about 22 km from Mathura.

== Demographics ==
As of 2001 India census, Baldeo had a population of 9695. Males constitute 54% of the population and females 46%. Baldeo has an average literacy rate of 63%, higher than the national average of 59.5%. 17% of the population is under 6 years of age.

== Shri Dauji Maharaj Mandir ==
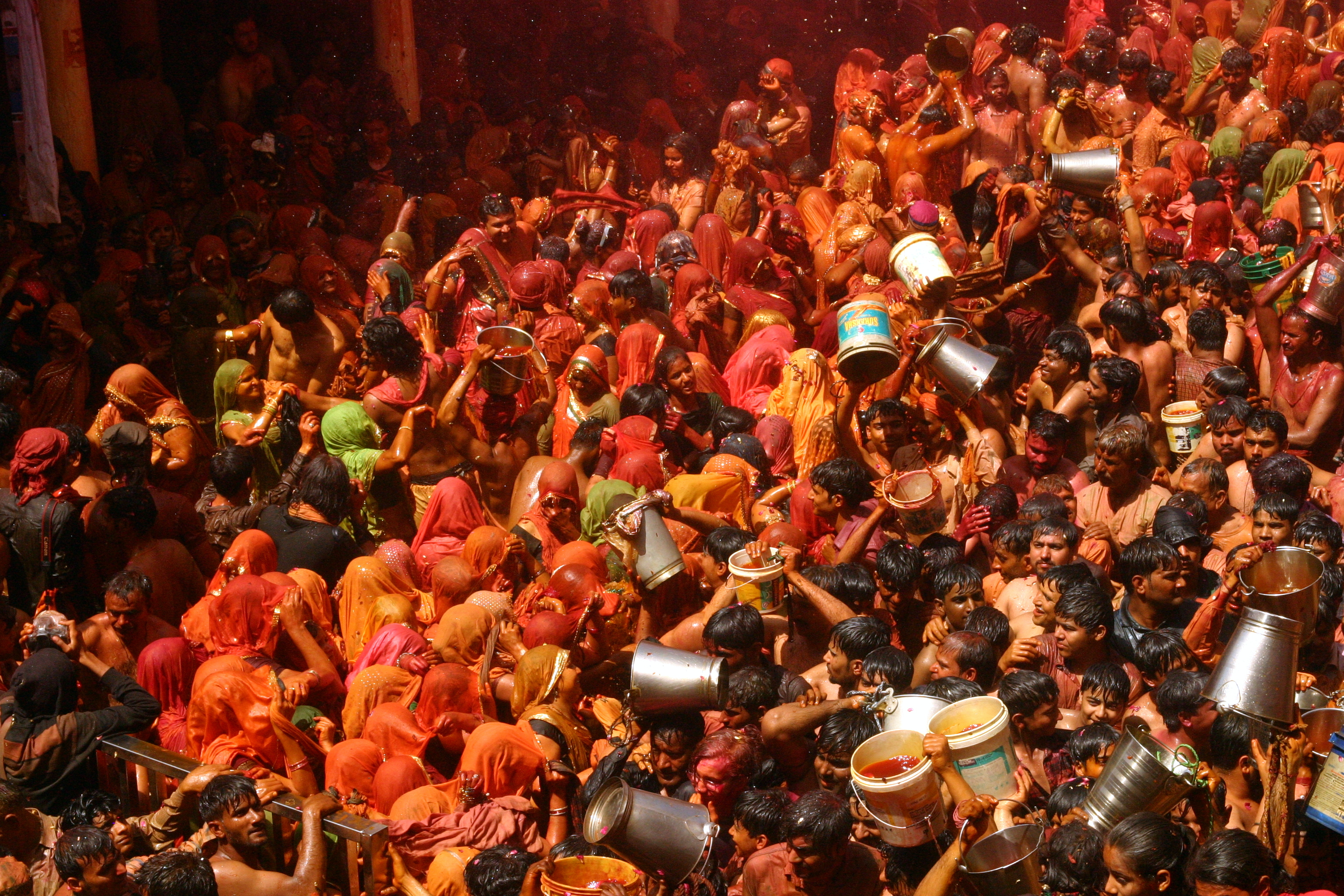
Holi celebration at Dauji Maharaj Mandir HURANGA

This town Baldeo(Dauji) is famous because of this historical temple of Shri Dauji Maharaj (Balram). Because of this temple town got this name. Baldeo is the elder brother of Yogiraj Shri Krishna.

This temple has been established somewhere around 1535 AD. For celebrating the establishment every year in December at the day of Margshish poornima (according to Vikram samwat calendar) MELA has been organised.

All of the festivals that are related to Hinduism has been celebrated in the temple. Holi is celebrated as HURANGA in the Shri Dauji maharaj Mandir is very much popular and the people from various places including outside the country used to for attending it.

== See also ==
- Krishna Janmasthan Temple Complex
- Ram Janmabhoomi, Rama's birthplace
- Janakpur Dham, Sita's birthplace in Nepal
- Punaura Dham, Sita's birthplace in India
- Kundinapuri, Rukmini's birthplace
- Kaundinyapur, near Nagpur and associated with Rukmini's birthplace Kundinapuri
- Raval, Mathura, Radha's birthplace
- Parikrama
- Yatra
