= Shahi Eidgah Mosque =

Historical mosque in Mathura, Uttar Pradesh, India

- شاہی عیدگاہ مسجد
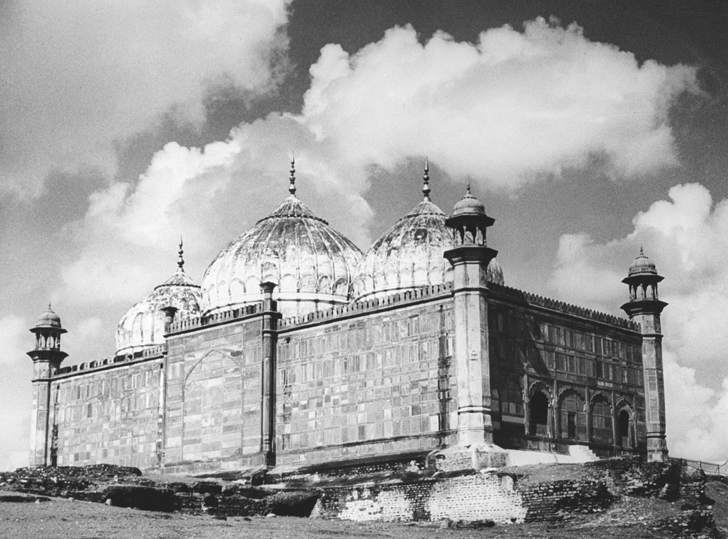
- The Shahi Eidgah in 1949

Religion
- Affiliation: Islam
- Rite: Sunni
- Ecclesiastical or organizational status: Active

Location
- Location: Mathura, Uttar Pradesh, India
- Interactive map of Shahi Eidgah Mosque
- Coordinates: 27°30′30″N 77°41′00″E

Architecture
- Founder: Aurangzeb
- Groundbreaking: 1670
- Completed: 1670

Specifications
- Dome: 3
- Materials: Red sandstone

Shahi Eidgah Mosque is a 17th-century mosque in Mathura, Uttar Pradesh, India, built under the orders of Mughal Emperor Aurangzeb in 1670. It stands adjacent to the Krishna Janmasthan Temple Complex, a site revered as the birthplace of the Hindu deity Krishna.

== Architecture ==
The Shahi Eidgah is a three-domed structure exemplifying Mughal architectural style, characterised by its open prayer area suitable for large gatherings during Eid prayers.

== See also ==
- Jama Mosque, Mathura
