= Kosi Kalan =

- town
- Location in Uttar Pradesh, India
- Coordinates: 27°47′N 77°26′E
- Country: India
- State: Uttar Pradesh
- District: Mathura

Government
  - Type: Municipality

Population (2011)
  - Total: 60,074

Languages
  - official: Hindi
  - Regional: Braj Bhasha
- Time zone: UTC+5:30 (IST)
- PIN: 281403
- Telephone code: 05662
- Vehicle registration: UP85
- Website: https://mathura.nic.in/

Kosi Kalan is a town and municipality of Mathura district in the Indian state of Uttar Pradesh. It is about 45 km from Mathura city and 100 km from New Delhi located in 27°47′N 77°26′E NH02 (Now NH 19 after renumbering) Delhi-Agra highway well connected with Mathura, Agra and Delhi with train and road. Khurd and Kalan are Persian-language words which mean small and big respectively. When two villages have same name then it is distinguished as Kalan means big and Khurd means small.

== Demographics ==
Khurd and Kalan are Persian language word which means small and big respectively when two villages have same name then it is distinguished as Kalan means big and Khurd means small with village name.

== Chairperson of Kosi ==
The town of Kosi Kalan is governed by a Chairperson, who is elected for 5 years. In year 1939, Kosi Kalan was declared as Notified Area and Shri Gayalal Agrawal was nominated as 1st Chairman.

- Lala Gayalal Agrawal (1939–1944)
- Lalaram Agarwal (1944–1953)
- Chetram Agarwal (1953–1956)
- Pannalal Agarwal ( 3 Months in 1956)
- Basant Lal Khandelwal (1956–1959)
- Phool Chand Jain (1959–1964)
- Hariram Bansal (1960–1963)
- Babulal Agrawal (1964–1971)
- Harmukh Ray Khandelwal (1971–1972)
- Jagadish Prasad Agrawal (1973–1976)
- Jagadish Prasad Agrawal (1976–1980)
- Jagadish Prasad Agarwal (1988–1994)
- Indira Sharma (1995–2000)
- Roshanlal Agrawal (2001–2005)
- Vandana Agarwal (2006–2012)
- Bhagwat Prasad Ruhela (2012–2017)
- Narendra Kumar (2017 – 2023)
- Dharmveer Agarwal (2023–current)

As of 2011 India census, Kosi Kalan had a population of 60,074. Males constitute 53.15% of the population and females 46.85%. Kosi Kalan has an average literacy rate of 69.8%, lower than the national average of 74.04%: male literacy is 78.41%, and female literacy is 60.08%. In Kosi Kalan, 18% of the population is under 6 years of age.

== Industries ==
There are many big companies which have their manufacturing units in Kosi and others have plans to set up units in near future.

- PepsiCo
- Air Liquide
- Mapei
- Jindal SAW Ltd.
- Varun Beverages
- JBM Group
- Vacmet India Limited
- Bodal Chemicals
- Ginni Filaments
- Swastik Pipes Limited
- Von Wellx
- JK Paints and Coatings
- Annapurna Swadisht
- Saera Electric Auto
- Strolar Mounting Systems
