= Biranarasingh Pur =

Sasana village in Puri district in Odisha

Coordinates: 19.8949°N 85.8015°E

Biranarasingh Pur is one of the oldest sasana village in Puri district in Odisha. The village is named after the great king of Odisha Gajapati Narasingh Dev. The then king of Odisha Gajapati Ramachandra Deva was a patron of Brahmins. He set up 16 Brahmin villages in different parts of the district Puri in order to arrange pujas and jagnyas in Jagannath Temple, Puri. The renowned Brahmins of different parts of country were brought by the king and then these 16 villages were established. These villages were known as sasanas. In those days villages were considered as the backbone of India. So these 16 sasanas had a great significance. Some of the elderly Brahmins of these villages were used to counsel the king for the welfare of state. Also only the Brahmins of some selected sasanas has the right to sit on the prestigious Mukti Mandap in Jagannath Temple, Puri. These sasana villages were characterized by a prefix Bira before the name of the village. For example- Biranarasingh Pur, Biraharekrushna Pur, Birabiswanath Pur etc. These villages are closely related to the Jagannath temple culture.

== Location ==
Biranarasingh Pur is situated on the bank of the sacred river the Bhargabi. The village is a planned one. The entire village is divided in subdivisions, such as the main village or Brahmin sahi, 2 bhoi sahis, Dhoba sahi, Mali sahi and panda sahi. The village has two temples namely Lord Nilakantha Temple and Lord Lokanath Temple at the two ends of the village. Also there is another temple named lord Gopinath Temple at one end of the main village. In the Nilakantha temple Lord Nilakantha and Lord pataleswara are worshiped as main deities and in Gopinath temple Lord Gopinath and Goddess Durga are worshipped as main deities. There are other five devi mandir (temple of different goddess) in this village among which the notable temples are Chinnamasta mandir and Jagrat Gouri mandir. The village has two ponds at the two ends of the main village.

The main village has been divided into two sub parts named as part 1 and part 2. the junction of the two parts is called Majhi khandi or danda khandi. The important functions and programs of the village are celebrated on this junction. The village post office, the village panchayat the Dayanidhi Yuvak Sangha office (Office of the Youth Council of Biranarasingh Pur) and Aryaniti Pradeepa Granthagara, the village library is also established near this midpoint of the main village. The village library is well equipped with different kinds of reading books and journals. The village has one primary school namely Biranarasingh Pur Government Primary School and one secondary high school namely Bhargabi High School. There are two banks in this village one is Punjab National Bank and the other one is Co-operative Bank of India.

== Population ==
There are currently nearly 2000 people living in this village. Most of the people of this village are highly educated and are government employers. Also a few villagers depend on cultivation. The village is full of coconut trees. Every person is the owner of more than at least two coconut trees. The village has council of elderly people namely village kotha. This council tries to solves different problems of the village and seeks the help of the Government if required. This council also manages all the functions and festivals that are organized in the village.

== Culture and Tradition ==
Being an Odia village, the people of this village celebrate different festivals in a year. Among these festivals sitalasasthi, Vijaya chaturdashi, Kumar Purnima, Dasahara, Dola Purnima and Holi are note-worthy. Biranarasingh Pur is famous for celebrating sitalasasthi. People of different parts of the district come this village to enjoy this festival. Another special festival is known as vijaya chaturdashi. It is observed only in this village and not in any part of the world. Every year before the festival kumar purnima a sports competition is held by the youth council of the village in order to encourage sports activities in the village. On the kumar purnima the winners are awarded by the local MLA, MP or Collector.
