= Gulal =

Face color mostly used in Holi celebration in India

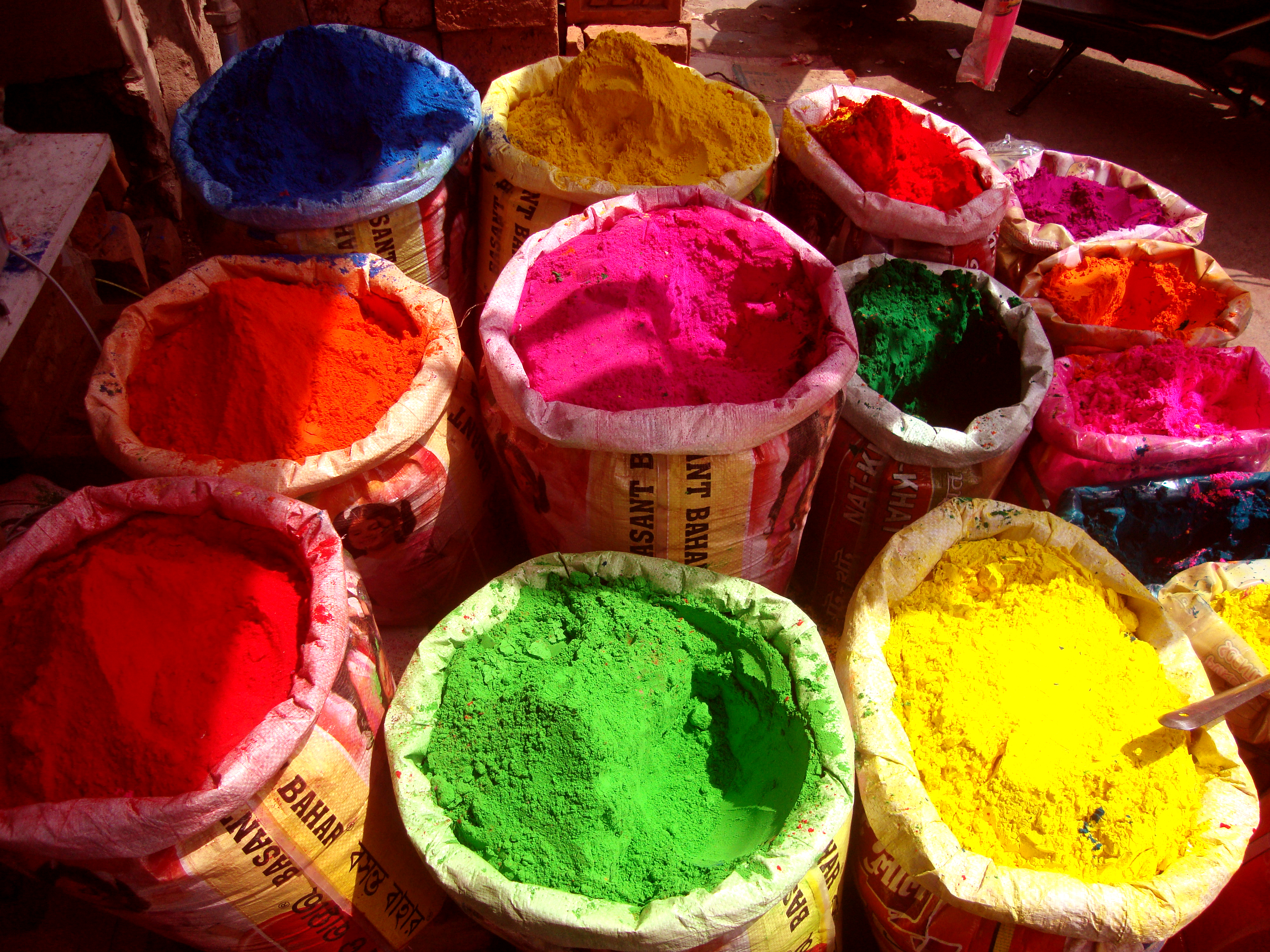
- Colours for Holi on sale at a market
- Type: Coloured powder

Gulal or abir is the traditional name given to the coloured powders used for some Hindu rituals, in particular for the Holi festival or Dol Purnima (though commonly associated with the red colour used in the festival). During Holi, which celebrates love and equality, people throw these powder solutions at each other while singing and dancing.

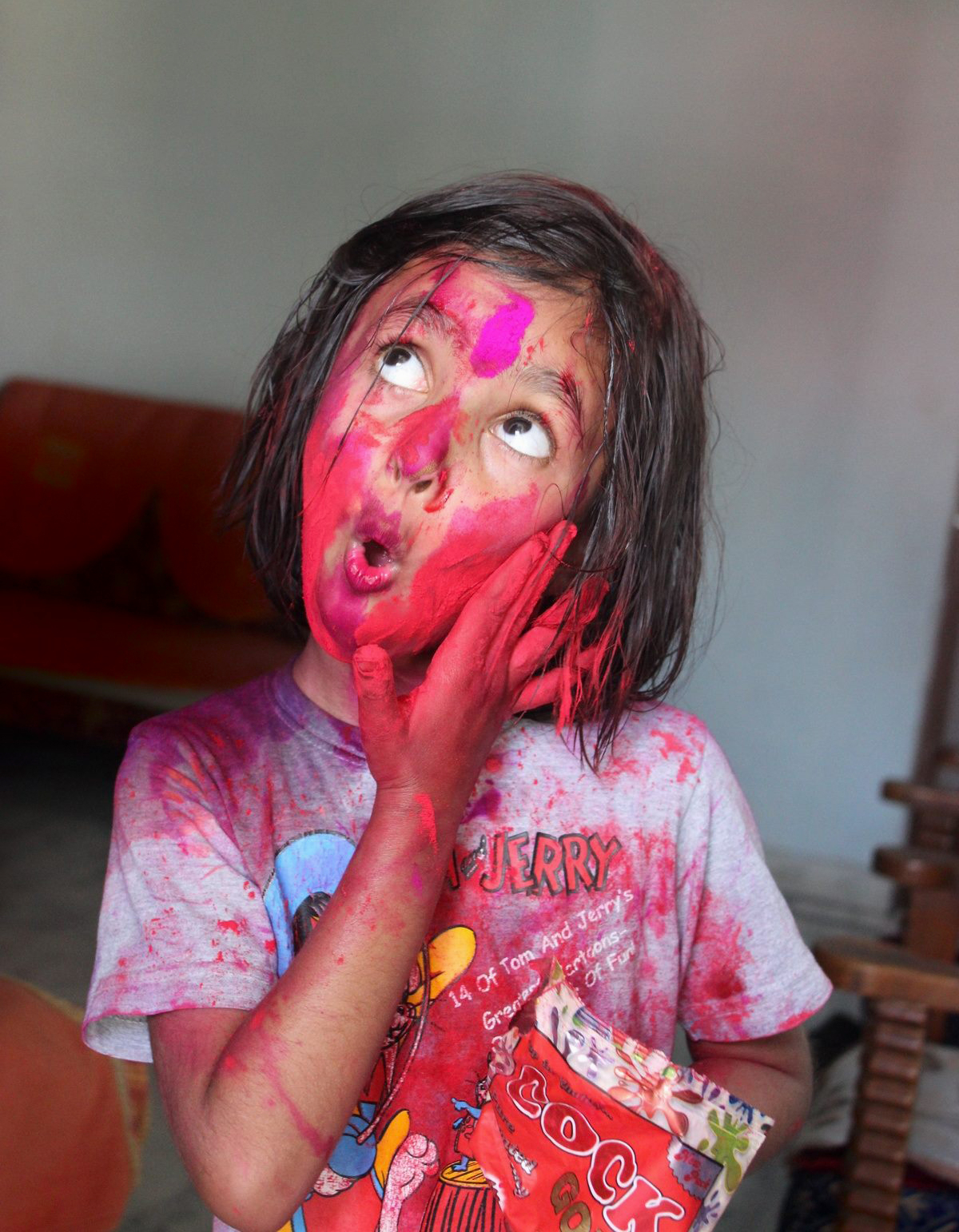
Little girl playing Holi with gulal

== Legend ==
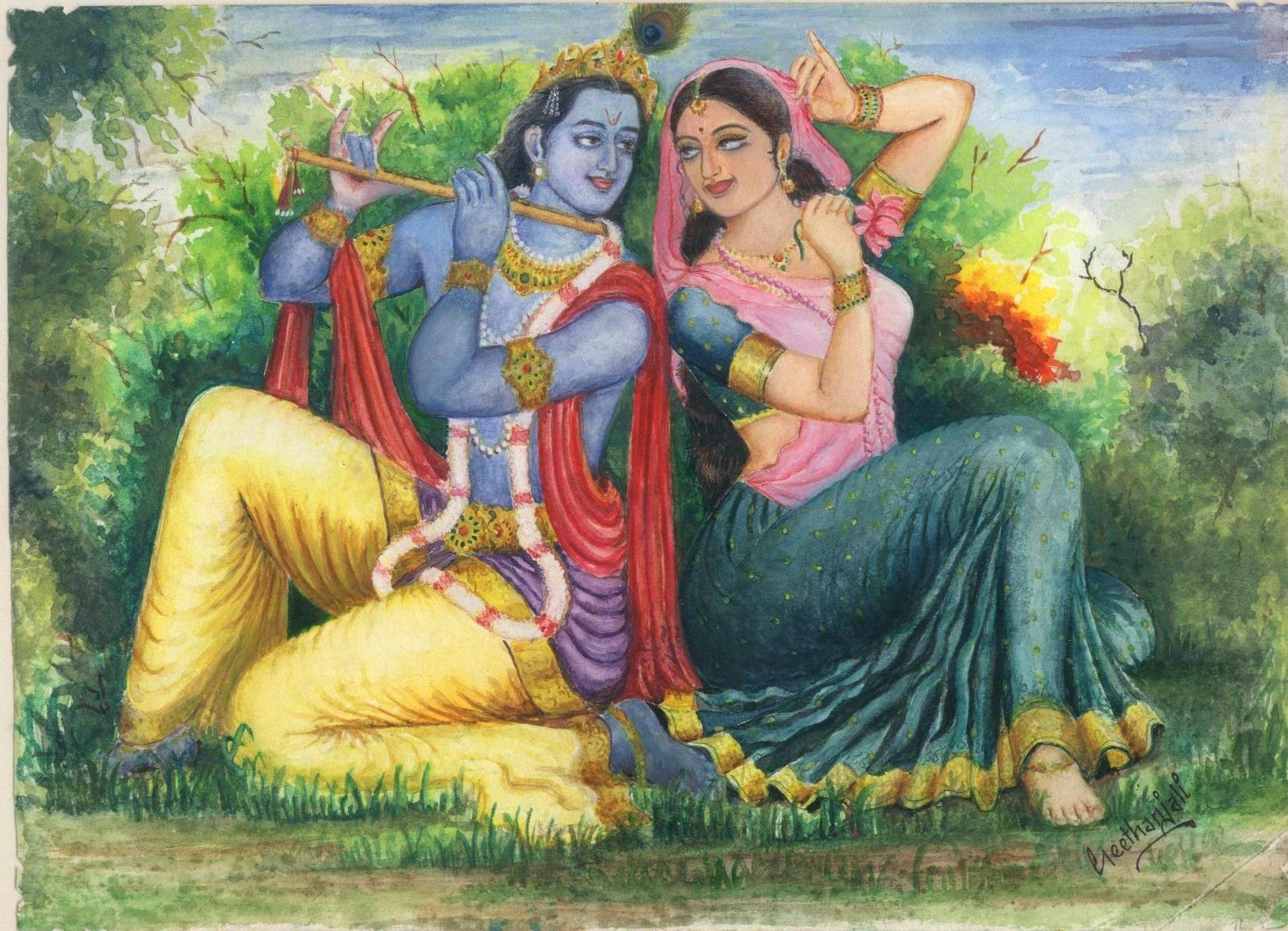
Krishna and Radha

According to Hindu mythology, Radha was extremely fair and Lord Krishna had a dark complexion. Because of their different skin tones, Krishna often worried about whether Radha would accept him and complained to his mother Yashoda. Yashoda once jokingly suggested that Krishna paint Radha's face a different colour to hide any differences. Krishna did as his mother advised and used gulal to smear Radha's face. And that's how the celebration of Holi began.

== Composition ==
=== From natural to chemical ===
In earlier times, Gulal powders were prepared from flowers coming from trees, such as the Indian coral tree and the flame of the forest, that had medicinal properties, beneficial to the skin. After the advent of synthetic dyes in the middle of 19th century, the disappearance of trees in urban areas and the pursuit of higher profits led to the abandonment of natural colours.

The new industrial dyes have been manufactured through chemical processes with non-standard parameters and hence the resulting colours are sometimes toxic for face and skin, causing problems such as eye irritation, allergies, skin infection and asthma. Unsafe products have often been sold on the road by small traders, in boxes with labels saying "for industrial use only".

Chemicals in Holi colours can lead to many harmful effects on health like skin issues, eye and respiratory problems.

=== Natural dyes ===
Indigofera tinctoria

The harmful effects and environmental concerns have led to alternative preparation of herbal gulal, using turmeric (Curcuma longa), indigo (Indigofera) or annatto (Bixa orellana) etc.

== Uses ==
=== Religious and cultural uses ===
Gulal powder has always had an important role in Hindu culture and has always been used for religious purposes. Besides Holi festival, the use of coloured powders appears in other ceremonies, such as funerals. In this case, in some populations, a particular ritual occurs when the deceased is a married man. The widow puts on all the ornaments she possesses and takes leave of her husband adorning him with all her jewels. Holding a small brass plate with colored powders, she lets the men participating in the ceremony paint the face of the deceased. This ritual is associated with the one of marriage, in which the bridegroom and the bride anoint themselves with coloured powders for four days before the wedding. This ointment, indeed, is meant to prepare their bodies for conjugal life. Beyond the religious sphere, the consumption of gulal powder is spread for different uses.

== Curiosities ==
Indian manufacturers of Holi colours are facing huge losses as Chinese alternatives capture more of the market. A survey reported that Chinese products are more innovative and cheaper by up to 55%, comparing to powders manufactured locally in regions like Uttar Pradesh, Rajasthan, Madhya Pradesh and Gujarat. The introduction of these Chinese products, despite the central government effort to promote "Made in India", is making survival difficult for small manufacturers, most of whom have been engaged in the business for decades.

Coldplay's video "Hymn for the Weekend" was filmed in Mumbai during the Holi festival, using gulal powder as a central feature.

The video for Steven Wilson's "Permanating" features a troupe of Bollywood dancers who scatter Gulal powders during the final minute of the song.

== See also ==
- Krishna
- The Color Run
