= Festival of Colours Tour =

Festival Of Colours
- Genre: Festival Tour (untimed)
- Location: International
- Years active: 3
- Inaugurated: July 2012; Berlin, Germany
- Website: holifestival.com

Festival Of Colours is a concert like event with music and coloured powder. It takes place on 4 continents. The event usually takes place on a Saturday from 12 noon to 10 pm.

== History ==
=== Origins ===
The Festival Of Colours is inspired by the traditional Hindu festival Holi, which usually takes place in March an marks the coming of spring. On this day, people throw powdered paint, known as gulal (hindi) or rang (nepali), at each other. For one day the distinctions between castes, religions and gender are set aside and everyone is equal. The festival is primarily observed in India and Nepal, but also in many other countries with a large Hindu population.

=== Beginnings ===
It first came to Europe on 29 June 2012. The first Festival was held in Berlin on the grounds of the Postbahnhof. Some of the 'guests' complained about incorrect information from the organizer. It was not sold out despite free tickets being given away. Not much of the Holi symbolism was felt at the Berlin Holi Festival.

=== Growth ===
There were three more Festivals Of Colour in 2012 in Munich, Hanover and Dresden. Munich was the biggest with 10,000 guests. In 2013 the Festival Of Colours Tour went global, starting in Berlin on 10 May and hitting 7 countries in 3 continents. The focus of the 2013 tour was Germany with 14 cities and 15 events (Berlin had two events in 2013). However, there were events in many big Cities, like Vienna, Amsterdam, Barcelona, London, Mexico City and Cape Town. Overall the total number of events in 2013 was 25. 2013 was also the first time that the Festival Of Colours was held on two consecutive days. London hosted a total of nearly 30,000 people at the Battersea Power Station on 10 and 11 August. The biggest single-day festival took place in Mannheim with 20,000 guests. 2014 the expansion is set to continue with new countries and cities joining the list, including Italy (Rome), France (Paris), New Zealand (Auckland), Ireland (Dublin), Tunisia (Hammamet) and Switzerland (Zürich).

== How it works ==
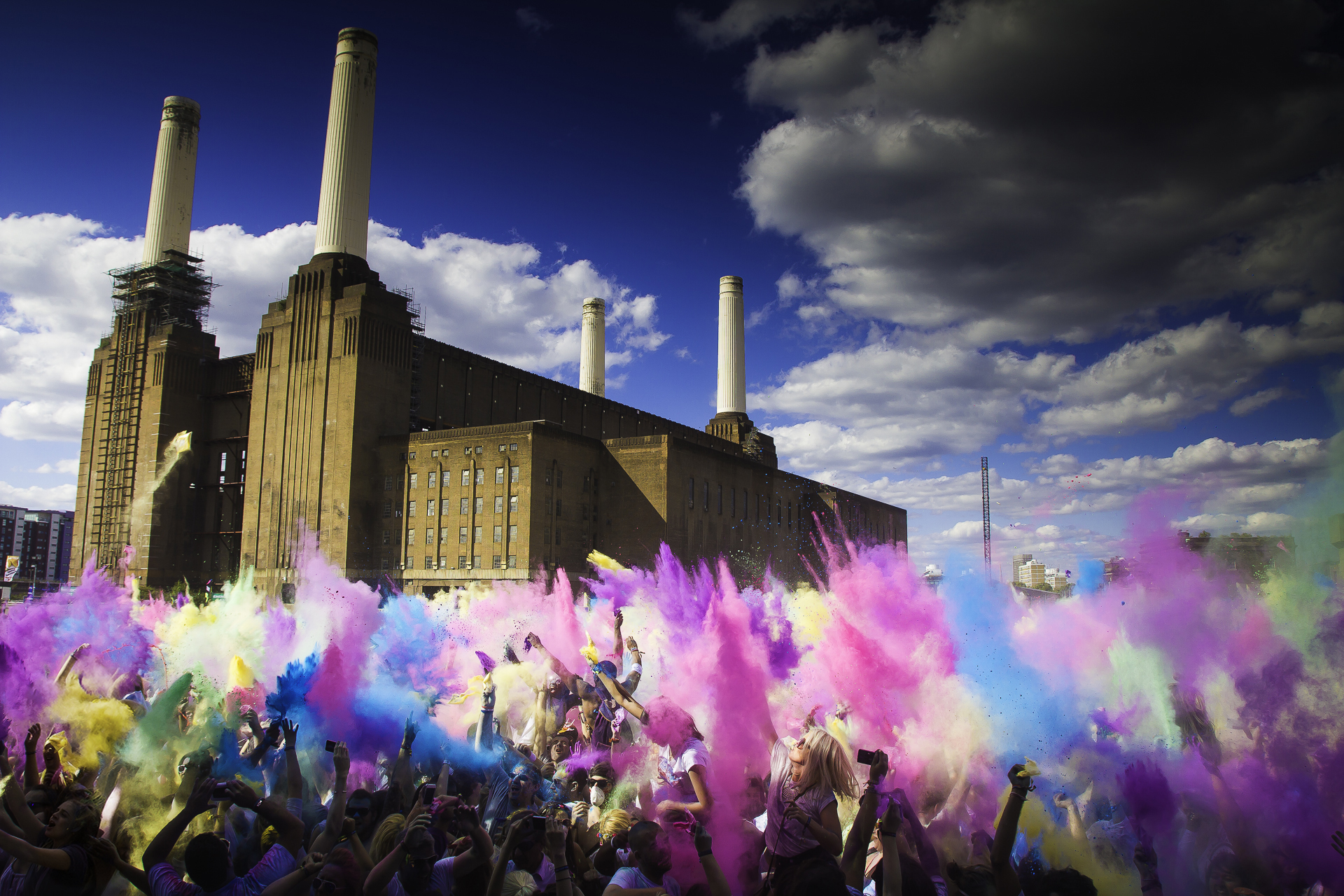
Festival Of Colours London 2013

=== Procedure ===
The procedure is very similar in all the cities of the Festival Of Colours tour. The festival begins at 12 noon. The first guests arrive and a local warm-up DJs have the chance to show their stuff. Each of the acts plays for 1–2 hours, with occasional guest showcases who are on shorter. At 3 pm everyone comes together for the first simultaneous colour throw of the day. This is then repeated every hour until the end. At 10pm the event is over and the music stops. The festival usually takes place on a Saturday, with the exception last year of London, where there was an event on a Sunday as well to accommodate the enormous demand for tickets. A video is produced for each event and onsite photo team follows each event, publishing pictures on the respective Facebook pages.

=== Set up ===
Generally there is one large stage where the DJs perform. There are also showacts, such as Indian dancers, drummers and performers. There are numerous food and drink stalls spread over the festival grounds. There is a large variety, from curry over pizza and pasta to french fries and ice cream. The colour powder can be bought at the festival as well, along with various merchandise products, like t-shirts, masks, sunglasses or Indian decorations.

== List of cities and countries ==
- Argentina

Buenos Aires
Mendoza
Córdoba

- Austria

Vienna
Linz

- Belgium

Antwerp

- Brazil

Rio de Janeiro

- Chile

Santiago

- Dominican Republic

Santo Domingo

- France

Paris

- Germany

Berlin
Bochum
Cologne
Dortmund
Dresden
Essen
Frankfurt
Hamburg
Hanover
Karlsruhe
Leipzig
Leverkusen
Mannheim
Munich
Nuremberg
Oberhausen
Saarbrücken
Stuttgart

- Greece

Athens

- Italy

Rome

- Ireland

Dublin

- Mexico

Mexico City
Cancún

- Netherlands

Amsterdam
Utrecht

- New Zealand

Auckland

- Peru

Lima

- South Africa

Cape Town
Johannesburg
Durban

- Spain

Barcelona
Avilés

- Switzerland

Zürich

- United Kingdom

London

== Performing DJs ==
- Aka Aka
- Andhim
- Animal Swing Kids
- Bara Bröst
- Benga
- Bombay Boogie Soundsystem
- Borgeous
- Breakage
- Christian Varela
- Cuebrick
- Daniel Steinberg
- Das Bo
- Dirty Doering
- Drauf & Dran
- Drunken Masters
- Dumme Jungs
- Edu Imbernon
- Eskei83
- Feadz
- Hanne & Lore
- Hausdoktoren
- Honka
- Juan Sanchez
- Kabale und Liebe
- Kele (Bloc Party)
- Lexy & K-Paul
- Marc Marzenit
- Marcus Meinhardt
- Mightyfools
- MistaJam
- Modek
- Moguai
- Moonbootica
- Oliver Koletzki
- Ostblockschlampen
- Panjabi MC
- Sander Kleinenberg
- Sascha Braemer
- Schluck den Druck
- Stereo Express
- Steve Nash
- Superflu
- The Oddword
- Tiefschwarz
- Turntablerocker
- Umami
