= Ranga Panchami =

Hindu festival

Rang Panchami
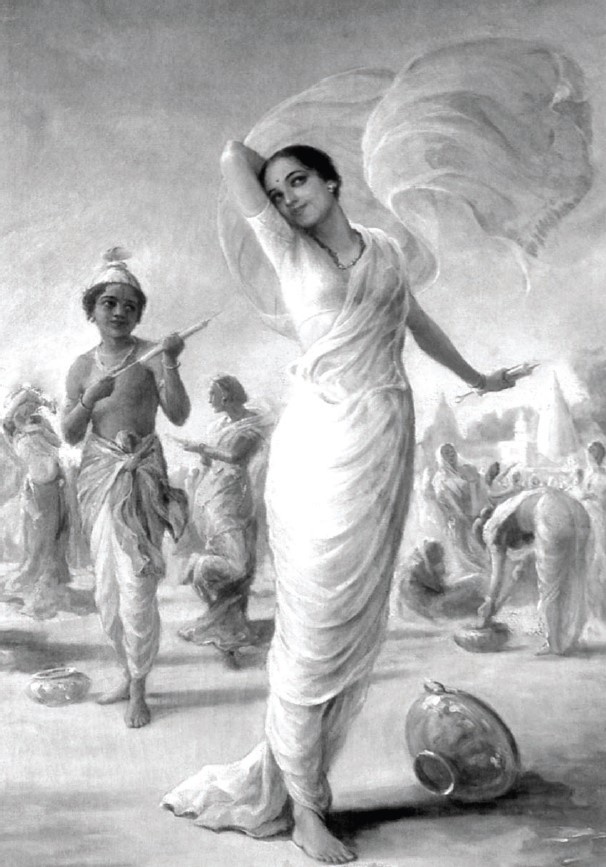
- 20th century painting depicting the festival
- Observed by: Hindus
- Type: Hinduism
- Significance: Arrival of spring, the love of Radha and Krishna, the salvation of Prahlada
- Celebrations: Spraying of colours, prayer, pujas
- Date: 12 March (2023)
- Related to: Holi

Ranga Panchami (Sanskrit: रङ्गपञ्चमी, romanized: Raṅgapañcamī) is a Hindu festival celebrated on the Chaitra Krishna Paksha Panchami, which is the fifth day of the second fortnight of the Hindu month of Phalguna. It is marked on the fifth day following the festival of Holi.

During Ranga Panchami, people sprinkle or smear colored powder on each other, similar to Holi. However, unlike Holi, on Ranga Panchami, people also splash colored water on each other. The festival is believed to have originated in Maharashtra and is also known as Shimga. In some places, people make small processions carrying an image of a deity, and the procession ends with the immersion of the deity in a nearby river or pond.

Ranga Panchami is a popular festival in Madhya Pradesh, Maharashtra, and Karnataka.

== Etymology ==
The word "ranga" means colour, and "panchami" refers to the fifth day in the Hindu month.

== Description ==
Ranga Panchami is celebrated as a festival of love and colour, associated with the divine couple Radha Krishna. According to another legend it shares with Holi, it is regarded to mark the event of the salvation of Prahlada from a bonfire lit by his aunt Holika, the sister of the asura king Hiranyakashipu.

== See also ==
- Holi
- Shigmo
- List of Hindu festivals in Maharashtra
