= BiH Color Festival =

- Dates: July–August
- Locations: Brčko, Bosnia and Herzegovina
- Years active: 2016-present
- Website: bihcolorfestival.com

The BiH Color Festival is an electronic music festival held annually in Brčko, Bosnia and Herzegovina. Its concept is based on the Indian and Nepali spring festival Holi ( /ˈhoʊliː/; Sanskrit: होली Holī). Festival attendees cover themselves in washable natural plant-derived colors such as turmeric, neem, dhak, and kumkum. A further one thousand kilograms of dry paint is shot over the crowd during the festival. It was established in 2016 and is held in July or August. It exclusively showcases unsigned and underground artists from the Former Yugoslavia.

== Festival by year ==
Year	Dates	Attendance	Main artists
2016	12-13 August	5,000	Drop Department, LuckyDee, Miloš Stankić, S.A.S.H.A., NEBS JACK, RI5E & 5HINE, Switch2Smile, Troublemakers, Vandal Steve, Vibe Out, WRECKΛGE, Zap Me Strobe, DYRIX, Speaker Humpin, RE3ORN, O&S, KRØWN
2017	28-29 July	6,000	Rise & Shine, No Control, Vic Damazi, Vantiz, Sasha Mikac, Matroda, Miloš Stankić, Patimonsta, Waking George, KRØWN, Odison, Zap Me Strobe, Wreckage, Vandal Steve, META, EXPLO, Mark Andersson, DJ Black Acid
2018	27-28 July	6,500	Karim Mika, Radiology, Drop Department, Mladen Tomić, Andrew Meller, Vladimir Aćić, WRECKΛGE, Pessto, Miloš Stankić, Vandal Steve, Timo G, Sasha Mikac, Clay Clemens, Steve Lowell, Vantiz, MILHØUSE, Wux, Medicality & Tywin Fox, Dexx, Space Motion, Vanyano, Eduy (Official), DIMA, Shivoos, Dražen Zimonjić, Frankie NV, Speaker Humpin, Ricochet, SML, Emil Preljević
2019	2-4 August	6,200	Matroda, Erick Kasell, Vandal Steve, Luis De Mark, Vill & Vash, DROP SENSEI, O&S, Alpha Beats, Mike Vale, Space Motion, MarkFunk, Leo Fragogiannis, Frankie NV, Ricochet, Second Chance, SaberZ, WRECKΛGE, Pessto, Miloš Stankić, Clay Clemens, Alpharun, Jelly For The Babies, Drazen Zimonjic, Wade Newhouse, Oliver S., Frankie NV, Denro, DJ AKSA, Medicality & Tywin Fox.
2020	2-4 August		Cancelled due to the COVID-19 Pandemic
2021	20-22 August	4,300	Divolly & Markward, Galoski, Vandal Steve, Vantiz, Wreckage, Denro, Drop Sensei, Galwaro, Miloš Stankić, MRGN MAAR, WUX, Marko Nastić, Bokee, Dejan Milićević, DJ Barba, Dražen Zimonjić, Drzneday, Epano, Siniša Lukić
