= Dol Purnima =

Indian Holi festival

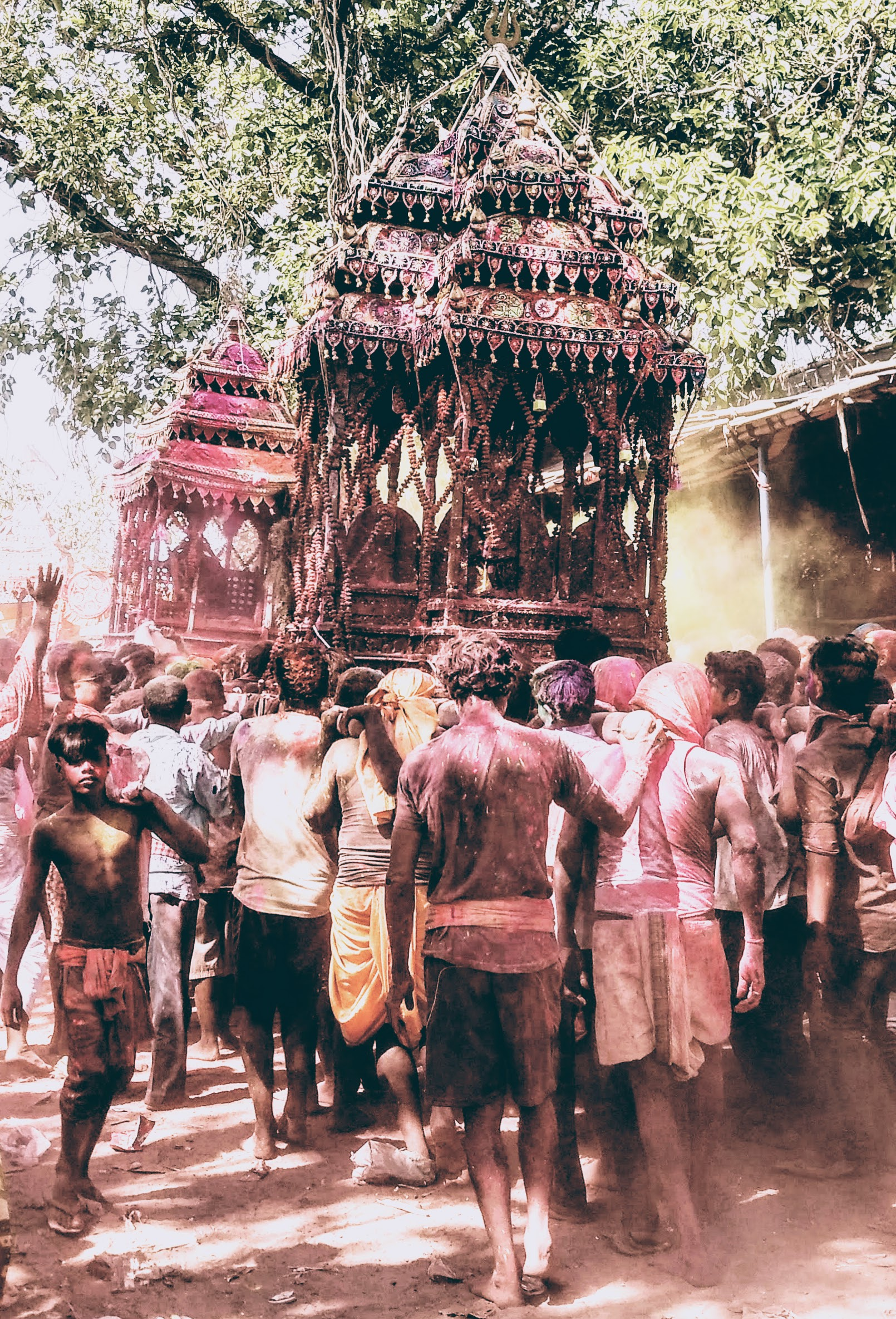
- Krishna being carried in a procession in Odisha on Dola Purnima
- Also called: Dol Jatra
- Observed by: Hindus of the Indian states/regions of Braj, Rajasthan, Gujarat, West Bengal, Odisha, Assam and Bangladesh
- Type: Religious, cultural, spring festival
- Celebrations: spraying coloured dye, playing with coloured powder, dancing, greetings, festival delicacies
- Date: Phalguna Purnima
- 2025 date: 14 March in India
- Frequency: Annual
- Related to: Holi

Dol Purnima, also popularly known as Dol Jatra, Doul Utsav, Dol yatra, Deul or Holi, is a Hindu swing festival celebrated during the Holi festival of Assam, Bengal, Braj region, Gujarat, Odisha, Rajasthan, and Tripura. This festival is dedicated to the divine couple of Radha and Krishna. It is usually celebrated on the full moon night or fifteenth day of the Falgun month mainly by Gopal community.

== Etymology and references in literature ==
Hindu literature is replete with references of terms like Dolotsava and Dola Yatra. Garga Samhita, a Vaishnav text has reference to Dolotsava of Shri Krishna in the month of Chaitra.

The Sanskrit word Dola means a swing, while utsava means a festival or a feast. Hence, Dolotsava literally means swing festival or swing feast and refers to religious service of swinging the idol of a deity on a swing.

Similarly, word Dola Yatra is compound of two Sanskrit words: Dola and yatra . Yatra refers to procession and thus Dola yatra refers to swing procession.

== Significance ==
=== Radha Vallabha Sampradaya ===
This festival is also celebrated with great fervor and enthusiasm in Radha Vallabh Sampradaya and Haridasi Sampradaya where the idols of Radha Krishna are worshipped and offered colours and flowers to commence the festivities.

=== Gaudiya Vaishnavism ===
In Gaudiya Vaishnavism, this festival is further more significant as it was the day when Chaitanya Mahaprabhu, its founder, was born.

== Celebration ==
On this auspicious day, the murtis of Krishna and his beloved Radha are richly adorned and besmeared with coloured powder. In Braj, Rajasthan, Gujarat, Bengal, Odisha and Assam, the murtis of Radha Krishna are taken out in procession in a swinging palanquin, decorated with flowers, leaves, coloured clothes and papers. The procession proceeds forward to the accompaniment of music, blaring of conch shells, trumpets horn and shouts of joy or victory and 'Hôri Bola'.

In the region of Assam, the festival is marked by singing songs, like "Phaku khele korunamoy" by the 16th Century Assamese poet Madhavdev, especially at the Barpeta Satra. The 15th century saint, artist and social reformer Srimanta Sankardev celebrated Doul at Bordowa in Nagaon, Assam. The festival also includes playing with colours made usually from flowers traditionally.

In South India, the kirtan compositions of the 15th century poet, Annamacharya and Tyagaraja are sung in the evening. Dolotsavam is celebrated on Holika Purnima at Suryanarayan Swamy temple at Arasavalli, Andhra Pradesh.

== See also ==
- Holi
- Lathmar Holi
- Hola Mohalla

== Bibliography ==
- Verma, Vanish (2002). Fasts and Festivals of India. New Delhi: Diamond Pocket Books.
