= Holi =

Indian Hindu spring festival of colours

- Also called: Festival of colours
- Observed by: Hindus, and others
- Type: Religious, cultural, spring festival
- Significance: Victory of good over evil; Celebration of the love of Radha Krishna; Arrival of Spring
- Celebrations: Night before Holi: Holika Dahana or Kama Dahana; On Holi: Playing with coloured powder and water, dancing, singing, greetings, festival delicacies
- Date: Phalguna Purnima
- Frequency: Annual
- Related to: Hola Mohalla, Shigmo and Yaosang

Explanatory note on Hindu festival dates
- The Hindu calendar is lunisolar but most festival dates are specified using the lunar portion of the calendar. A lunar day is uniquely identified by three calendar elements: māsa (lunar month), pakṣa (lunar fortnight) and tithi (lunar day). Furthermore, when specifying the masa, one of two traditions are applicable, viz. amānta / pūrṇimānta. If a festival falls in the waning phase of the moon, these two traditions identify the same lunar day as falling in two different (but successive) masa. A lunar year is shorter than a solar year by about eleven days. As a result, most Hindu festivals occur on different days in successive years on the Gregorian calendar.

Holi (IPA: ['hoːli:, hoːɭiː]) is a major Hindu festival of colours, love and spring. It celebrates the love between the deities Radha and Krishna. Additionally, the day signifies the triumph of good over evil, as it commemorates the victory of Vishnu as Narasimha over Hiranyakashipu. Holi originated in the ancient Indian subcontinent and is predominantly celebrated in the Indian subcontinent, but has also spread to other regions of Asia and parts of the Western world.

Holi also celebrates the arrival of spring in India and Nepal, the end of winter, and the blossoming of love. It is also an invocation for a good spring harvest season. It lasts for a night and a day, starting on the evening of the Purnima (full moon day) falling on the Hindu calendar month of Phalguna, which falls around the middle of March in the Gregorian calendar.

== Names ==
Holi (Hindi: होली, Gujarati: હોળી, Kannada: ಹೋಳಿ, Marathi: होळी, Nepali: होली, Punjabi: ਹੋਲੀ, Telugu: హోళి, Odia: ହୋଲି) is also known as Dol Jatra ("swing festival") and Bôshonto Utshôb (Bengali: বসন্ত উৎসব) ("spring festival") in Bengal (West Bengal and Bangladesh), Phakua (Assamese: ফাকুৱা) and Dôl Jātrā (Assamese: দ'ল যাত্ৰা) in Assam, Phāgu Pūrṇimā (Nepali: फागु पूर्णिमा) in the hilly region of Nepal, Dola jātra (Odia: ଦୋଳଯାତ୍ରା) in Odisha, Fagua or Phagua (Bhojpuri: 𑂤𑂏𑂳𑂄/फगुआ) in eastern Uttar Pradesh, western Bihar, and northwestern Jharkhand, Holi (Mauritian Bhojpuri: होली) in Mauritius, Phagwah or Phagwa (Caribbean Hindustani: फगवा) in the Caribbean (namely Trinidad and Tobago, Guyana, Suriname, and Jamaica), and Phagua (Fiji Hindi: फगुआ) in Fiji.

The main day of the celebration is known as "Holi", "Rangwali Holi", "Dola Purnima", "Dhuleti", "Dhulandi", "Ukuli", "Manjal Kuli", "Yaosang", "Shigmo", "Phagwah", or "Jajiri".

== About the festival ==
Holi is a sacred ancient tradition of Hindus. It is a cultural celebration that gives Hindus and non-Hindus alike an opportunity to have fun and play with other people by throwing coloured water and powder at each other. It is also observed broadly on the Indian subcontinent. Holi is celebrated at the end of winter, on the last full moon day of the Hindu luni-solar calendar month, marking the spring, making the date vary with the lunar cycle. (Note: Since ancient times, the Indian subcontinent has had several major Hindu calendars, which places Holi and other festivals on different local months even though they mean the same date. Some Hindu calendars emphasise the solar cycle, some the lunar cycle. Further, the regional calendars feature two traditions of Amanta and Purnimanta systems, wherein the similar-sounding months refer to different parts of a lunar cycle, thus further diversifying the nomenclature. The Hindu festival of Holi falls on the first (full moon) day of Chaitra lunar month's dark fortnight in the Purnimanta system, while the same exact day for Holi is expressed in Amanta system as the lunar day of Phalguna Purnima. Both time measuring and dating systems are equivalent ways of meaning the same thing, they continue to be in use in different regions. In regions where the local calendar places it in its Phalguna month, Holi is also called Phaguwa.) The date falls typically in March, but sometimes in late February of the Gregorian calendar.

The festival has many purposes; most prominently, it celebrates the beginning of spring. In 17th century literature, it was identified as a festival that celebrated agriculture, commemorated good spring harvests, and the fertile land. Hindus believe it is a time to begin enjoying spring's abundant colours and say farewell to winter. To many Hindus, Holi festivities mark an occasion to reset and renew ruptured relationships, end conflicts, and rid themselves of accumulated emotional impurities from the past.

It also has a religious purpose, symbolically signified by the legend of Holika. The night before Holi, bonfires are lit in a ceremony known as Holika Dahan (burning of Holika), or Little Holi. People gather near the fires, sing, and dance. The next day, Holi, also known as Dhuli in Sanskrit, or Dhulheti, Dhulandi, or Dhulendi, is celebrated.

== History ==
The Holi festival is an ancient Hindu festival with its own cultural rituals, which emerged before the Gupta period. The festival of colours finds mentioned in numerous scriptures, such as in works like Jaimini's Purva Mimamsa Sutras and Kathaka-Grhya-Sutras, with even more detailed descriptions in ancient texts like the Narada Purana and Bhavishya Purana. Love poems in the ancient text Gaha Sattasai mentions the Holi festival. The festival of "holikotsav" was also mentioned in the 7th-century Sanskrit drama Ratnavali, by King Harsha. It is mentioned in the Puranas, Dasakumara Charita by Daṇḍin, and by the poet Kālidāsa during the 4th-century reign of Chandragupta II.

The festival of Holi caught the fascination of European traders and British colonial staff by the 17th century. Various old editions of the Oxford English Dictionary mention it, but with varying, phonetically derived spellings: Houly (1687), Hooly (1698), Huli (1789), Hohlee (1809), Hoolee (1825), and Holi in editions published after 1910.

== Gods and goddesses ==
=== Radha Krishna ===
In the Braj region of India, where the Hindu deities Radha and Krishna grew up, the festival is celebrated until Rang Panchmi in commemoration of their divine love for each other. The festivities officially usher in spring, with Holi celebrated as a festival of love. Garga Samhita, a puranic work by Sage Garga was the first work of literature to mention the romantic description of Radha and Krishna playing Holi.

There is also a symbolic legend behind the festival. In his youth, Krishna despairs whether the fair-skinned Radha will like him because of his dark skin colour. His mother Yashoda, tires of his desperation and asks him to approach Radha and ask her to colour his face in any colour she wishes. This Radha does, and Radha and Krishna become a couple. Ever since, the playful colouring of Radha and Krishna's faces has been commemorated as Holi.

Beyond India, these legends help to explain the significance of Holi (Phagwah), which is common in some Caribbean communities of Indian origin such as Guyana, Suriname, Trinidad and Tobago, and Jamaica. It is also celebrated with great fervour in Mauritius, Fiji, and South Africa.

=== Background ===
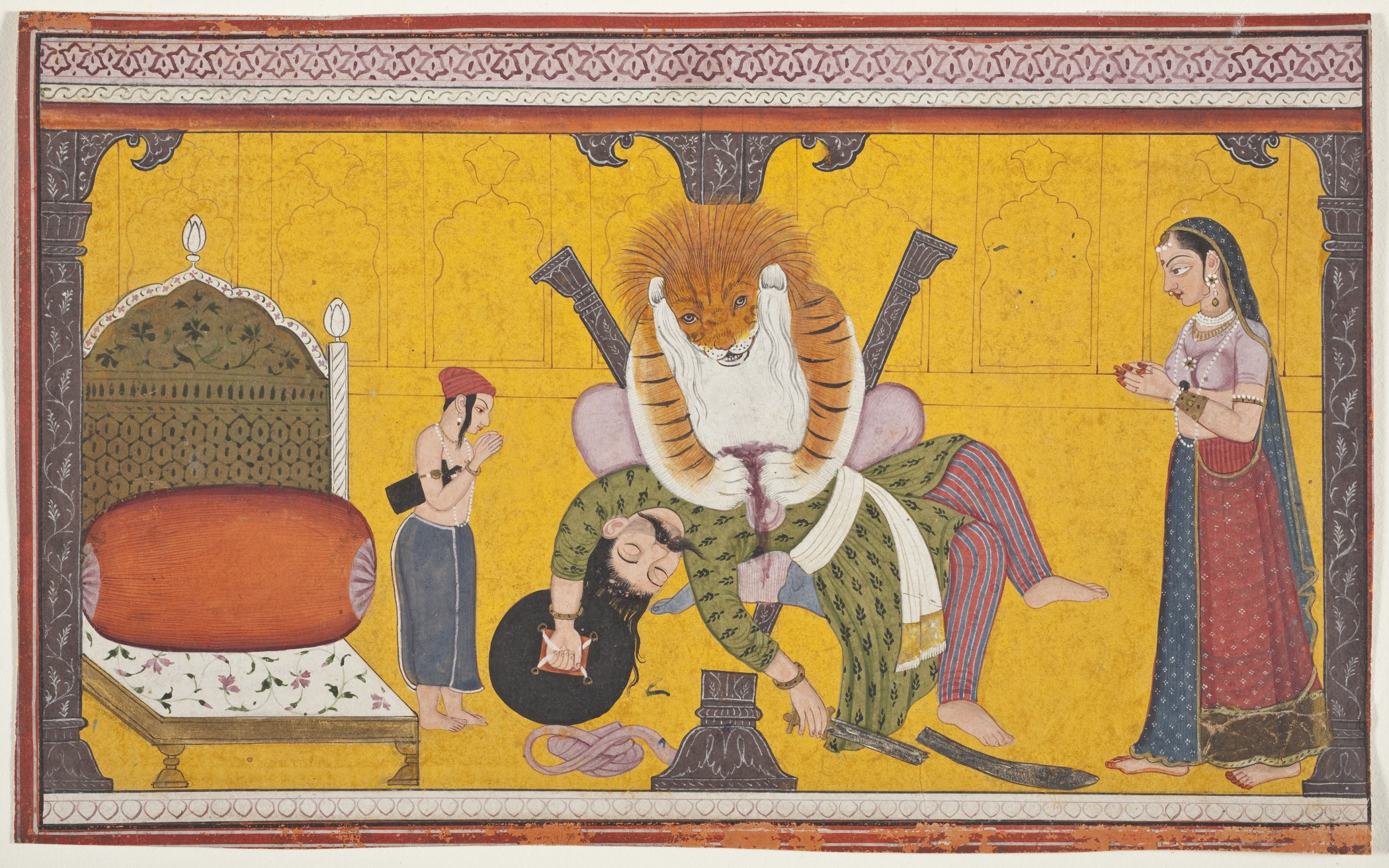
Lord Narasimha emerging from a pillar and disembowelling Hiranyakashipu, with Prahlada on the left, manuscript folio from a Bhagavata Purana, 1760–1770

There is a symbolic legend found in the 7th chapter of the Bhagavata Purana explaining why Holi is celebrated as a festival of triumph of good over evil in the honour of Hindu god Vishnu and his devotee Prahlada. King Hiranyakashipu, the father of Prahlada, was the king of demonic Asuras and had earned a boon that gave him five special powers: he could be killed by neither a human being nor an animal, neither indoors nor outdoors, neither at day nor at night, neither by astra (projectile weapons) nor by any shastra (handheld weapons), and neither on land nor in water or air. Hiranyakashipu grew arrogant, thought he was God, and demanded that everyone worship only him. Hiranyakashipu's own son, Prahlada, however, remained devoted to Vishnu. This infuriated Hiranyakashipu. He subjected Prahlada to cruel punishments, none of which affected the boy or his resolve to do what he thought was right. Finally, Holika, Prahlada's evil aunt, tricked him into sitting on a pyre with her. Holika was wearing a cloak that made her immune to injury from fire, while Prahlada was not. As the fire spread, the cloak flew from Holika and encased Prahlada, who survived while Holika burned. Vishnu, the god who appears as an avatar to restore Dharma in Hindu beliefs, took the form of Narasimha – half human and half lion (which is neither a human nor an animal), at dusk (when it was neither day nor night), took Hiranyakashyapu at a doorstep (which was neither indoors nor outdoors), placed him on his lap (which was neither land, water nor air), and then eviscerated and killed the king with his lion claws (which were neither a handheld weapon nor a launched weapon).

The Holika bonfire and Holi signifies the celebration of the symbolic victory of good over evil, of Prahlada over Hiranyakashipu, and of the fire that burned Holika.

=== Kama and Rati ===
Among other Hindu traditions such as Shaivism and Shaktism, the legendary significance of Holi is linked to Shiva in yoga and deep meditation. Goddess Parvati wanting to bring Shiva back into the world, seeks help from the Hindu god of love called Kamadeva on Vasant Panchami. The love god shoots arrows at Shiva, the yogi opens his third eye and burns Kama to ashes. This upsets both Kama's wife Rati (Kamadevi) and his own wife Parvati. Rati performs her own meditative asceticism for forty days, upon which Shiva understands, forgives out of compassion and restores the god of love. This return of the god of love, is celebrated on the 40th day after the Vasant Panchami festival as Holi. The Kama legend and its significance to Holi has many variant forms, particularly in South India.

== Influence ==
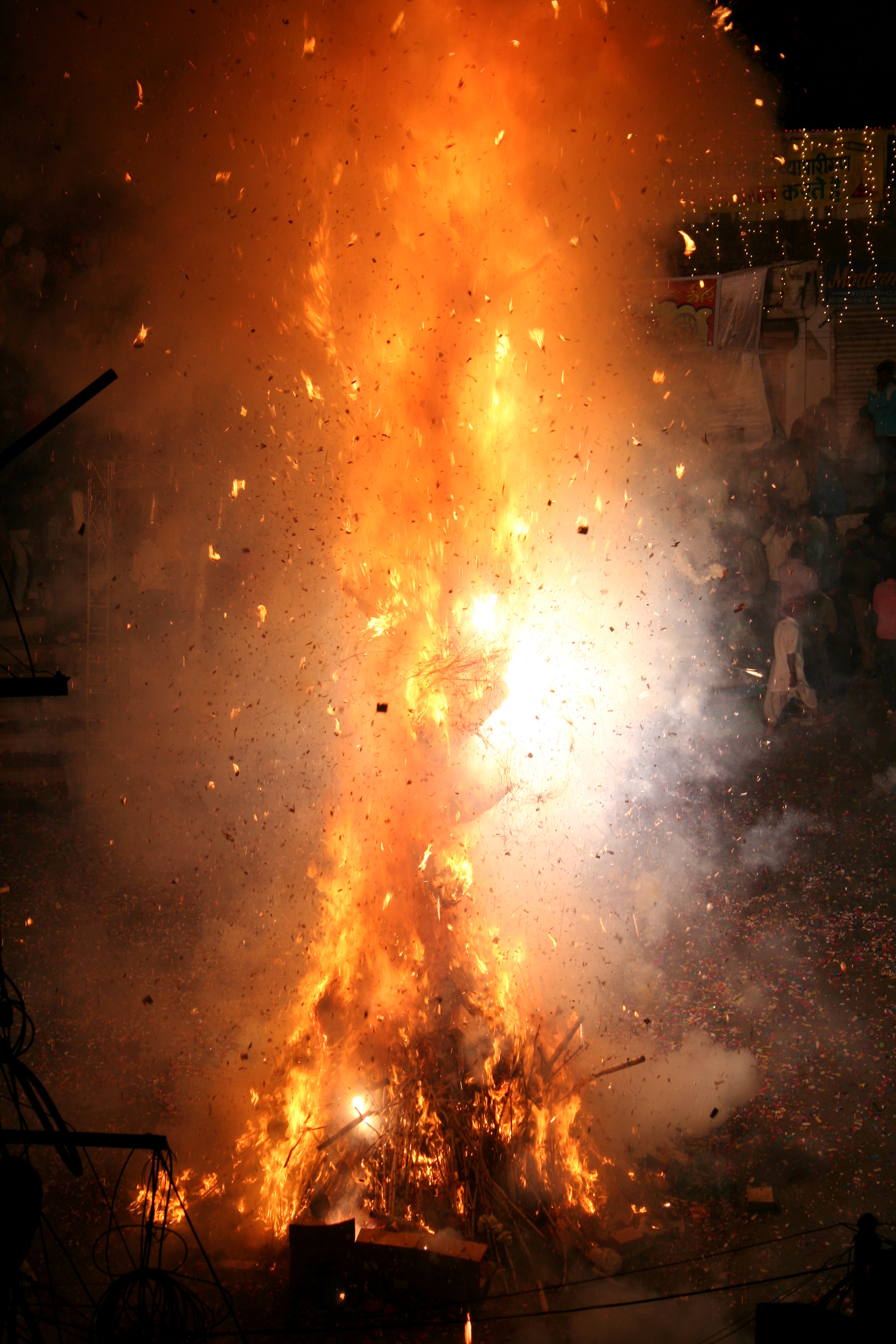
Holika bonfire in front of Jagdish Temple in Udaipur, Rajasthan, 2010

The Holi festival has a cultural significance among various Hindu traditions of the Indian subcontinent. It is the festive day to end and rid oneself of past errors, to end conflicts by meeting others, a day to forget and forgive. People pay or forgive debts, as well as deal anew with those in their lives. Holi also marks the start of spring, an occasion for people to enjoy the changing seasons and make new friends.

Holi is of particular significance in the Braj region, which includes locations traditionally associated with Radha Krishna: Mathura, Vrindavan, Nandgaon, Barsana, and Gokula. These places are popular tourist attractions during Holi.

Outside India, Holi is observed by Hindus in Nepal, Bangladesh and Pakistan as well as in countries with large diaspora populations from India around the world. The Holi rituals and customs can vary with local adaptations.

=== Celebration of Holi in other Indian religions ===
Sikhs have traditionally celebrated the festival, at least through the 19th century, with its historic texts referring to it as Hola. Guru Gobind Singh – the last human guru of the Sikhs – modified Holi with a three-day Hola Mohalla extension festival of martial arts. The extension started the day after the Holi festival in Anandpur Sahib, where Sikh soldiers would train in mock battles, compete in horsemanship, athletics, archery and military exercises.

Holi was observed by Maharaja Ranjit Singh and his Sikh Empire that extended across what are now northern parts of India and Pakistan. According to a report by Tribune India, Sikh court records state that 300 mounds of colours were used in 1837 by Ranjit Singh and his officials in Lahore. Ranjit Singh would celebrate Holi with others in the Bilawal gardens, where decorative tents were set up. In 1837, Sir Henry Fane who was the commander-in-chief of the British Indian army joined the Holi celebrations organised by Ranjit Singh. A mural in the Lahore Fort was sponsored by Ranjit Singh and it showed the Hindu god Krishna playing Holi with gopis. After the death of Ranjit Singh, his Sikh sons and others continued to play Holi every year with colours and lavish festivities. The colonial British officials joined these celebrations.

The festival has also traditionally been observed by Jains and Newars (Nepal).

=== Celebration of Holi in India during the Mughal rule ===
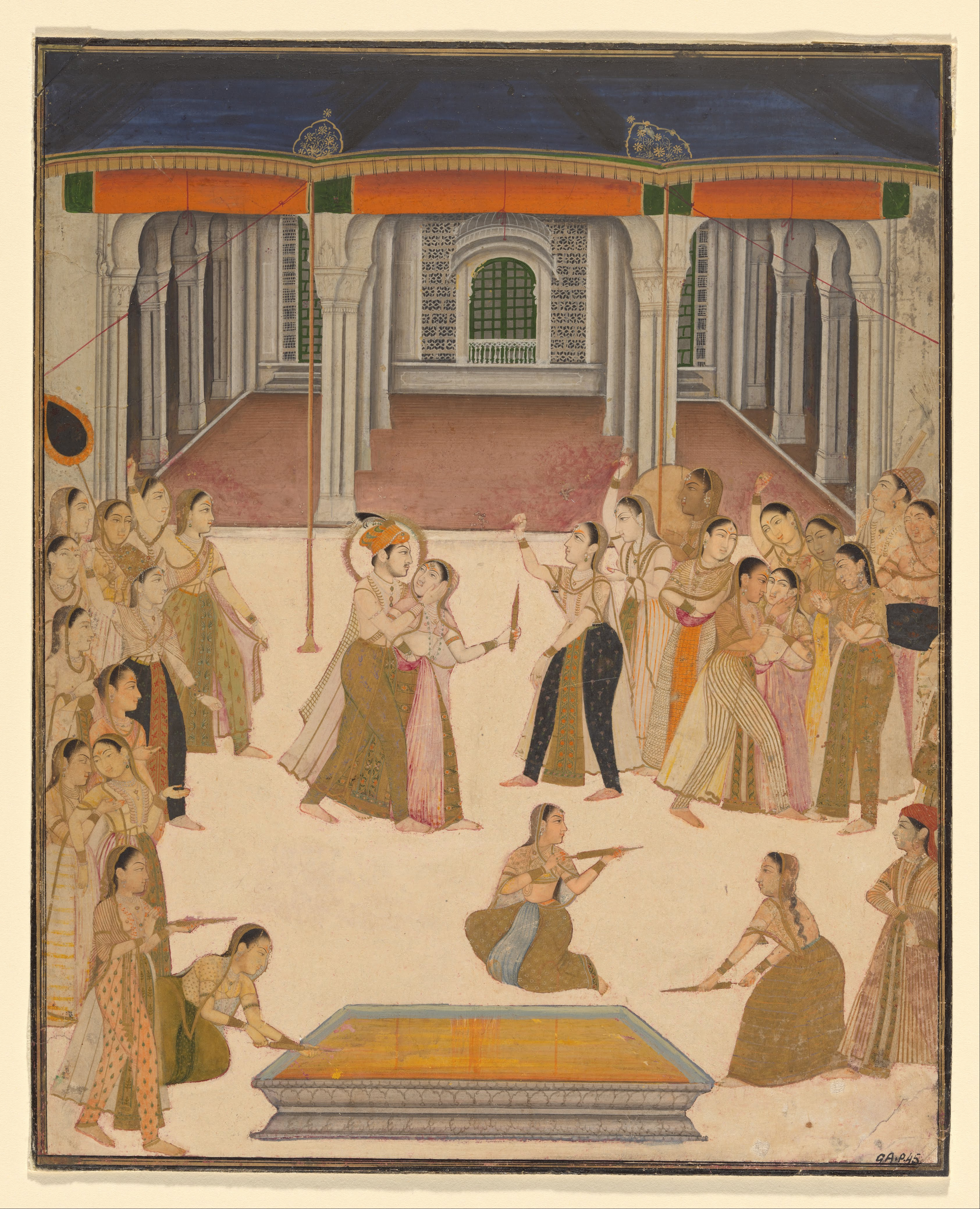
The Mughal Indian emperor Jahangir celebrating Holi with ladies of the zenana

In Mughal India, Holi was at times suppressed, and at others celebrated with such exuberance that Hindu citizens of all castes could throw colour on the Muslim Mughal Emperor.

According to Sharma (2017), "there are several paintings of Mughal emperors celebrating Holi". Grand celebrations of Holi were held at the Lal Qila, where the festival was also known as Eid-e-gulaabi or Aab-e-Pashi. Mehfils were held throughout the walled city of Delhi with aristocrats and traders alike participating.

This changed during the rule of Emperor Aurangzeb. He banned the public celebration of Holi using a Farman issue in November 1665.

The celebration was later restarted again after the death of Emperor Aurangzeb. Bahadur Shah Zafar himself wrote a song for the festival, while poets such as Amir Khusrau, Ibrahim Raskhan, Nazeer Akbarabadi and Mehjoor Lakhnavi relished it in their writings.

== Celebrations ==
=== Holika Dahan ===
The night before Holi is called Holika Dahan or "Chhoti Holi" whereby people gather around a lit bonfire, symbolising the victory of good over evil as well as the removal of the old and arrival of the new. Various rituals are performed around the fire such as singing and dancing. This ritual is derived from the story of Holika, who attempted to kill Prahlada, the son of Hiranyakashipu, through the flames of a bonfire. Although Holika was endowed with a boon to remain immune to fire, she was burned to ashes, while Prahlada remained unharmed.

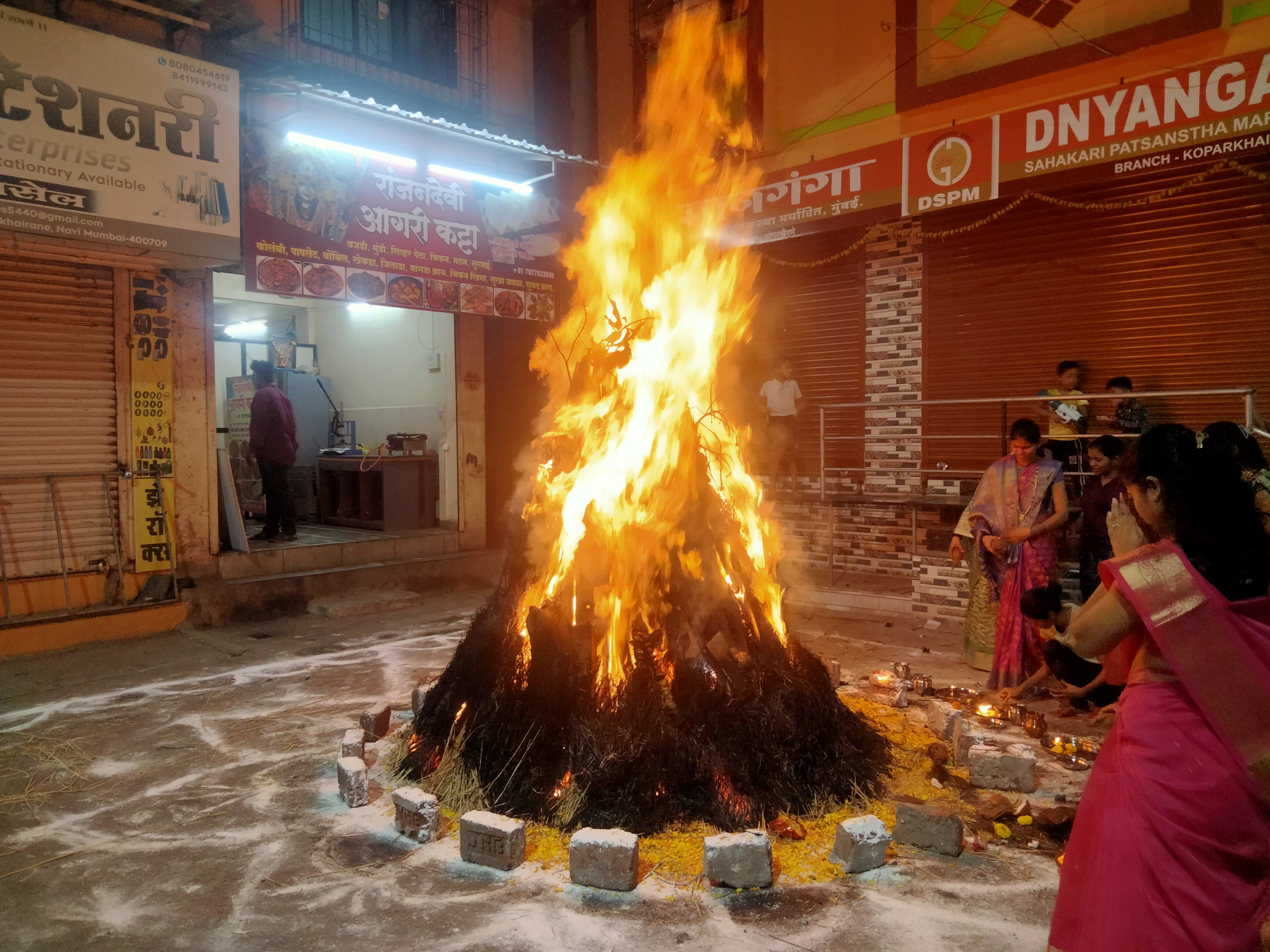
View of celebration of the Holika Dahan festival at Koparkhairane in Navi Mumbai, 2025

=== Main day ===
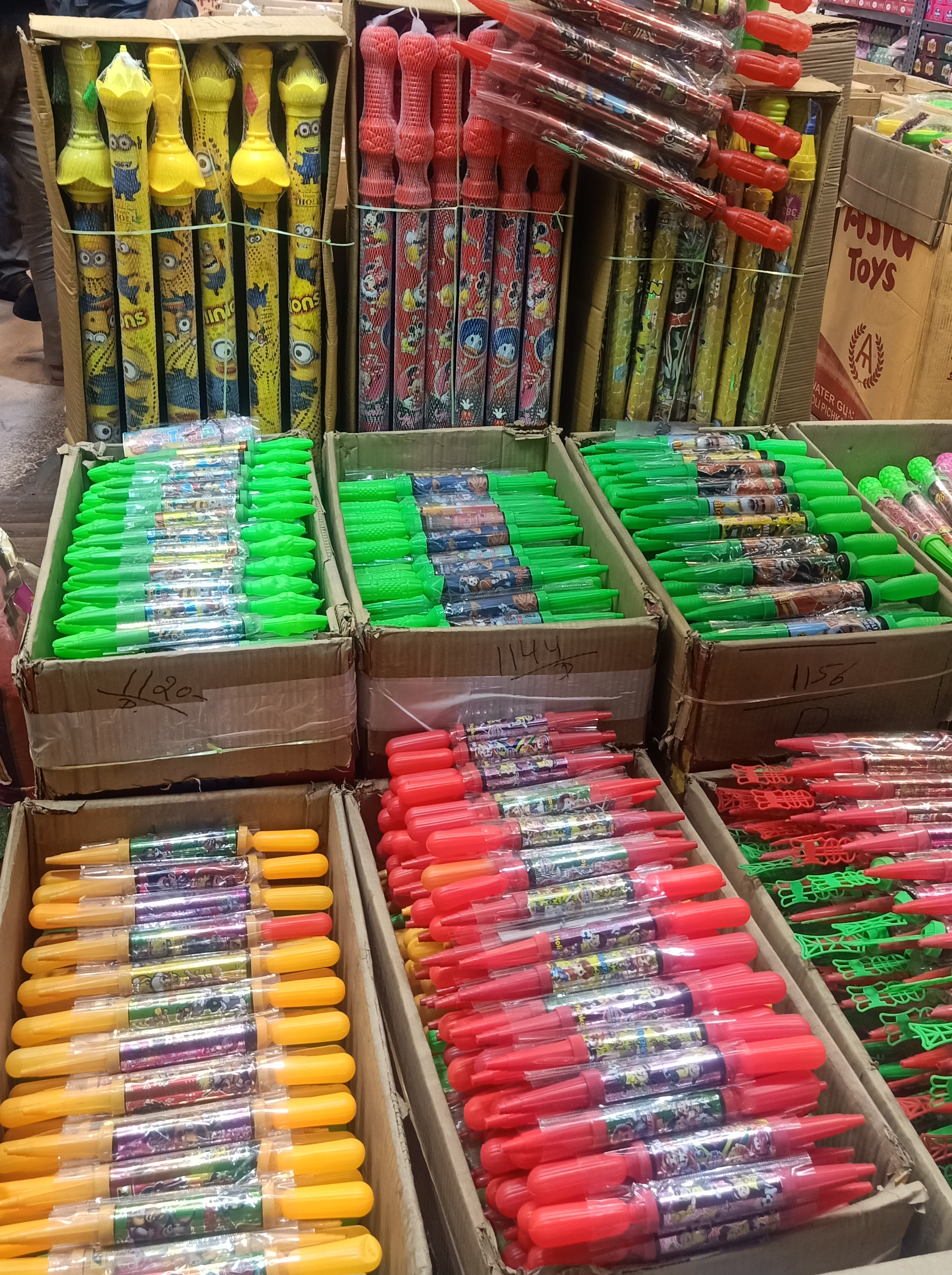
Holi festival water gun

The next morning is celebrated as Rangwali Holi (Dhuleti) where people smear and drench each other with colours. Water guns and water-filled balloons are often used to play and colour each other, with anyone and any place being considered fair game to colour. Groups often carry drums and other musical instruments going from place to place, singing and dancing. Throughout the day, people visit family, and friends and foes come together to chat, enjoy food and drinks, and partake in Holi delicacies. Holi is also a festival of forgiveness and new starts, which ritually aims to generate harmony in society. Many cities in Uttar Pradesh also organise Kavi sammelan in the evening.

Groups sing and dance, some playing drums and dholak. After each stop of fun and play with colours, people offer gujiya, mathri, malpuas and other traditional delicacies. Cold drinks, including drinks made with marijuana, are also part of the Holi festivity.

=== India ===
==== Andhra Pradesh and Telangana ====
Holi is called as Kamuni Punnami/Kama Purnima or Jajiri in Telugu. Hindus celebrate Holi as it relates to the legend of Kamadeva. Holi is also known by different names: Kamavilas, Kamuni Panduga and Kama-Dahanam.

It is a 10-day festival in Telangana, of which last two days are of great importance. As in other parts of India, in rural Telangana, the 9 days preceding Holi, children celebrate kamuda by playing Kolata sticks along with singing folk songs called jajiri and collect money, rice, corn and wood. For this reason Holi is well known for "Jajiri Paatalu Kamudi aatalu", which means festival of "Jajiri songs and Kamudi games" and on 9th night i.e. Holi eve, all the wood is put together and set on fire representing Kama Dahanam.

Next morning i.e. 10th day is celebrated as Holi, with colours traditionally extracted from Moduga/Gogu Flowers (Palash/Butea monosperma).

==== Bihar, Eastern Uttar Pradesh and Jharkhand ====
Holi is known as Phaguwa or Fagua in the Bhojpuri language. In this region as well, the legend of Holika is prevalent. On the eve of Phalgun Poornima, people light bonfires. They put dried cow dung cakes, wood of the Araad or Redi tree and Holika tree, grains from the fresh harvest and unwanted wood leaves in the bonfire. At the time of Holika people assemble near the pyre. The eldest member of the gathering or a purohit initiates the lighting. He then smears others with colour as a mark of greeting. Next day the festival is celebrated with colours and much frolic. Traditionally, people also clean their houses to mark the festival.

Holi Milan is also observed in Bihar, where family members and well-wishers visit each other's family, apply colours (abeer) on each other's faces, and on feet, if elderly. Usually, this takes place on the evening of Holi, day after Holi with wet colours is played in the morning through the afternoon. Due to large-scale internal migration issues faced by the people, recently, this tradition has slowly begun to transform, and it is common to have Holi Milan on an entirely different day either before or after the actual day of Holi.

Children and youths take extreme delight in the festival. Though the festival is usually celebrated with colours, in some places, people also enjoy celebrating Holi with water solutions of mud or clay. Folk songs are sung at high pitch and people dance to the sound of the dholak (a two-headed hand-drum) and the spirit of Holi. Intoxicating bhang, made from cannabis, milk and spices, is consumed with a variety of mouth-watering delicacies, such as pakoras and thandai, to enhance the mood of the festival.

In the Kanpur, Holi lasts for seven days. On the last day, a fair called Ganga Mela or the Holi Mela is celebrated. The fair was started by freedom fighters who fought British rule.

In Gorakhpur district of Uttar Pradesh, a special event called "Holi Milan" is celebrated.

==== Goa ====
Holi is locally called Ukkuli in Konkani. It is celebrated around the Konkani temple called Gosripuram temple. It is a part of the Goan or Konkani spring festival known as Śigmo or शिगमो in Koṅkaṇī or Śiśirotsava, which lasts for about a month. The colour festival or Holi is a part of longer, more extensive spring festival celebrations. Holi festivities (but not Śigmo festivities) include: Holika Puja and Dahan, Dhulvad or Dhuli vandan, Haldune or offering yellow and saffron colour or Gulal to the deity.

==== Gujarat ====
In Gujarat, Holi is a two-day festival. On the evening of the first day, a bonfire is lit and raw coconut and corn is offered to the fire. The second day is the festival of colour or "Dhuleti", celebrated by sprinkling coloured water and applying colours to each other. Dwarka, a coastal city of Gujarat, celebrates Holi at the Dwarkadhish temple with citywide music festivities. Holi marks the agricultural season of the rabi crop.

In some places, there is a custom in undivided Hindu families that the woman beats her brother-in-law with a sari rolled up into a rope in a mock rage and tries to drench him with colours, and in turn, the brother-in-law brings sweets (Indian desserts) to her in the evening.

==== Jammu and Kashmir ====
In Jammu and Kashmir, Holi celebrations are much in line with the general definition of Holi celebrations: a high-spirited festival to mark the beginning of the harvesting of the summer crop, with the throwing of coloured water and powder and singing and dancing.

==== Karnataka ====
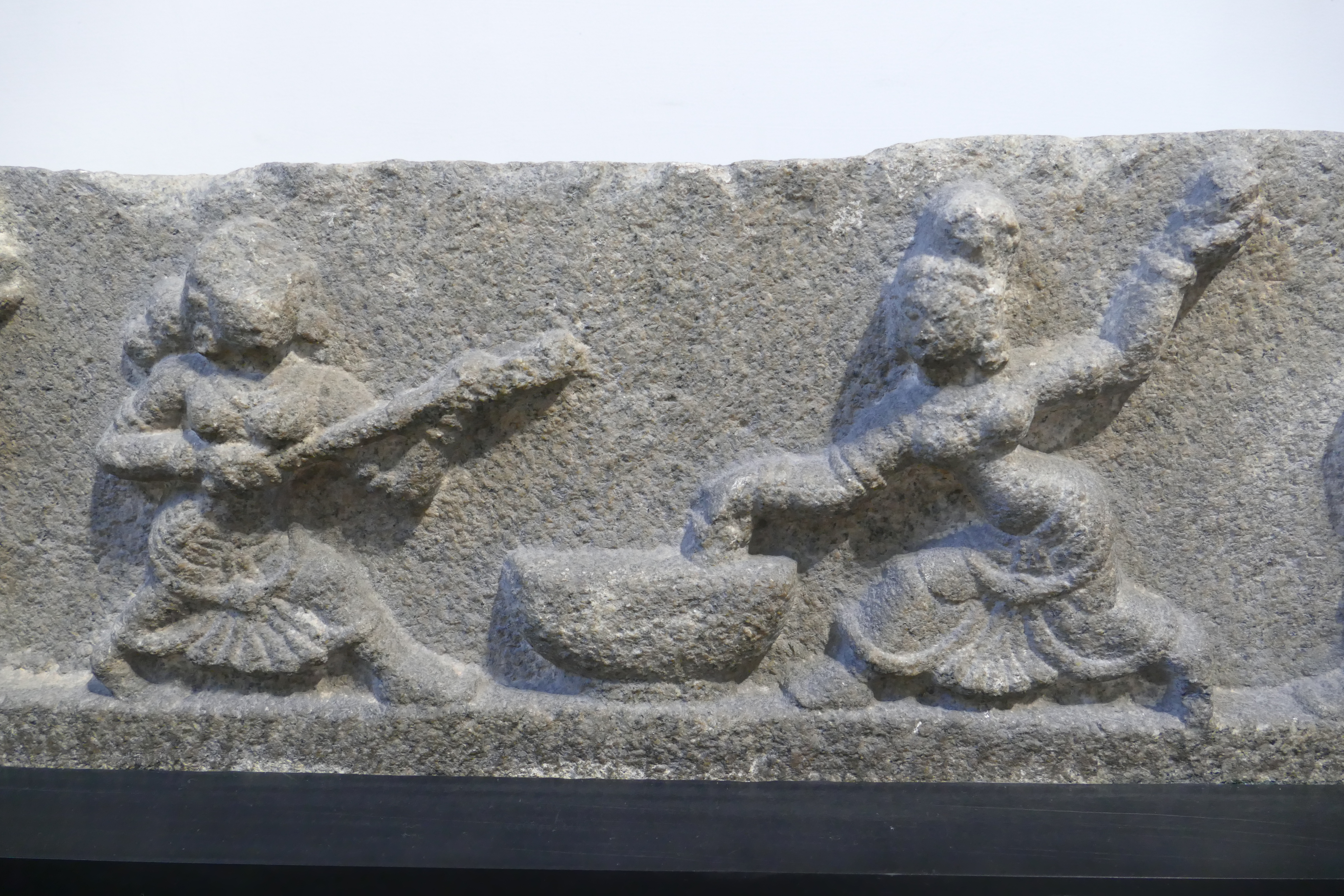
Holi celebration depicted on stone relief 15th century, Karnataka

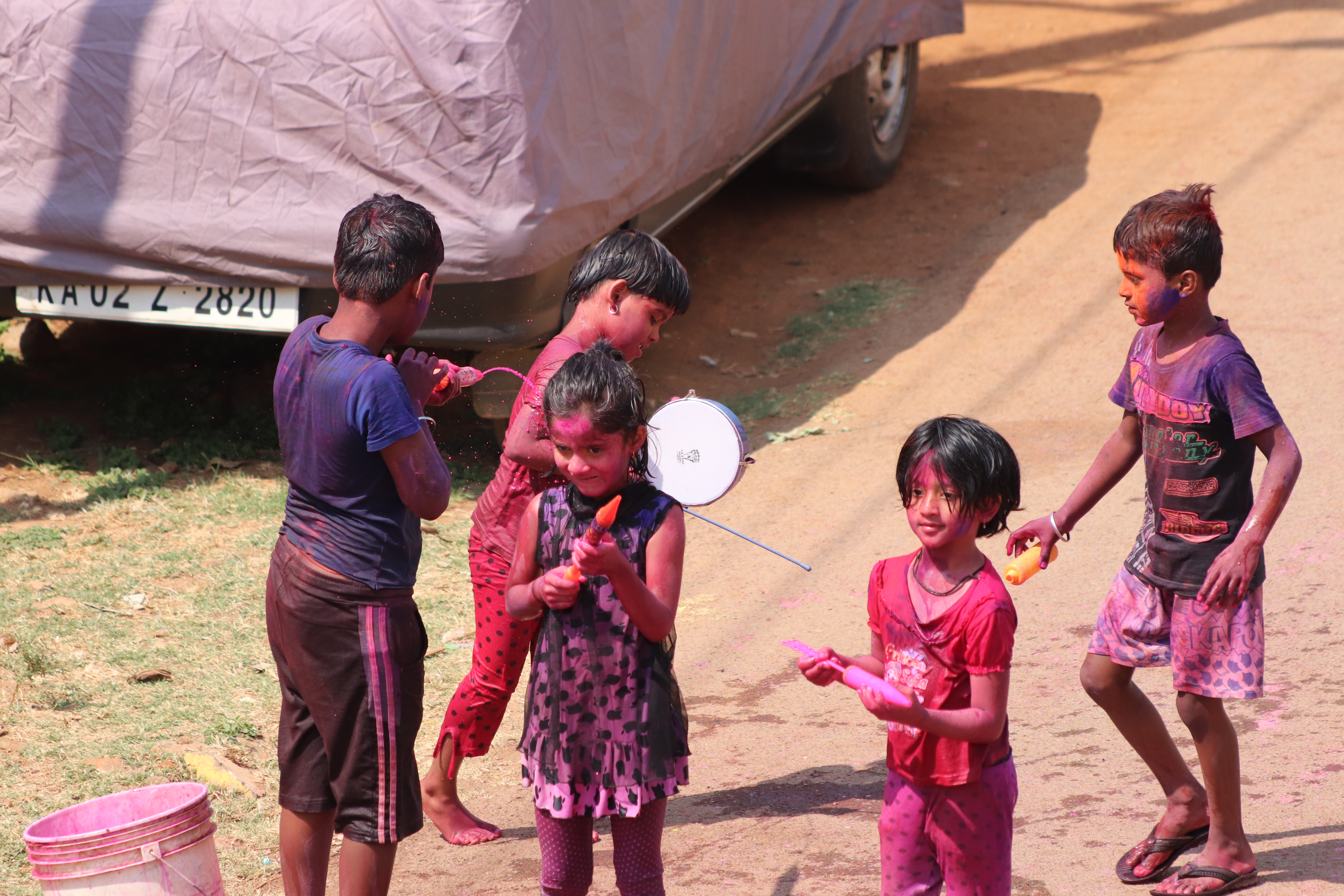
Children playing holi, Karnataka

Traditionally, in rural Karnataka, children collect money and wood in the weeks prior to Holi, and on "Kamadahana" night, all the wood is put together and lit. The festival is celebrated for two days. People in northern parts of Karnataka prepare special food on this day. Holi festival is also depicted on medieval reliefs and sculptures, notably on 12th century Chennakesava temple in Belur and 15th century relief from Hampi, where people are depicted playing holi with colours and pichkaris.

In Sirsi, Karnataka, Holi is celebrated with a unique folk dance called "Bedara Vesha", which is performed during the nights beginning five days before the actual festival day. The festival is celebrated every alternate year in the town, which attracts a large number of tourists from different parts of India.

Wooden idols of Kamanna and Rati are put on public display and taken on parade in some parts of Karnataka. Large idols of Kama made of bamboo are burnt after Holi Hunnime festival in northern Karnataka. Ramalinga Kamanna Utsava is a unique festival celebrated in Navalgund, Karnataka, during Holi. The festivities center around the installation of an idol of Kamanna, representing Kamadeva (the god of love), at the Ramalingeshwara Temple. Devotees from various regions gather to offer silver articles, such as cradles for those desiring children, believing their wishes will be fulfilled.

==== Maharashtra ====
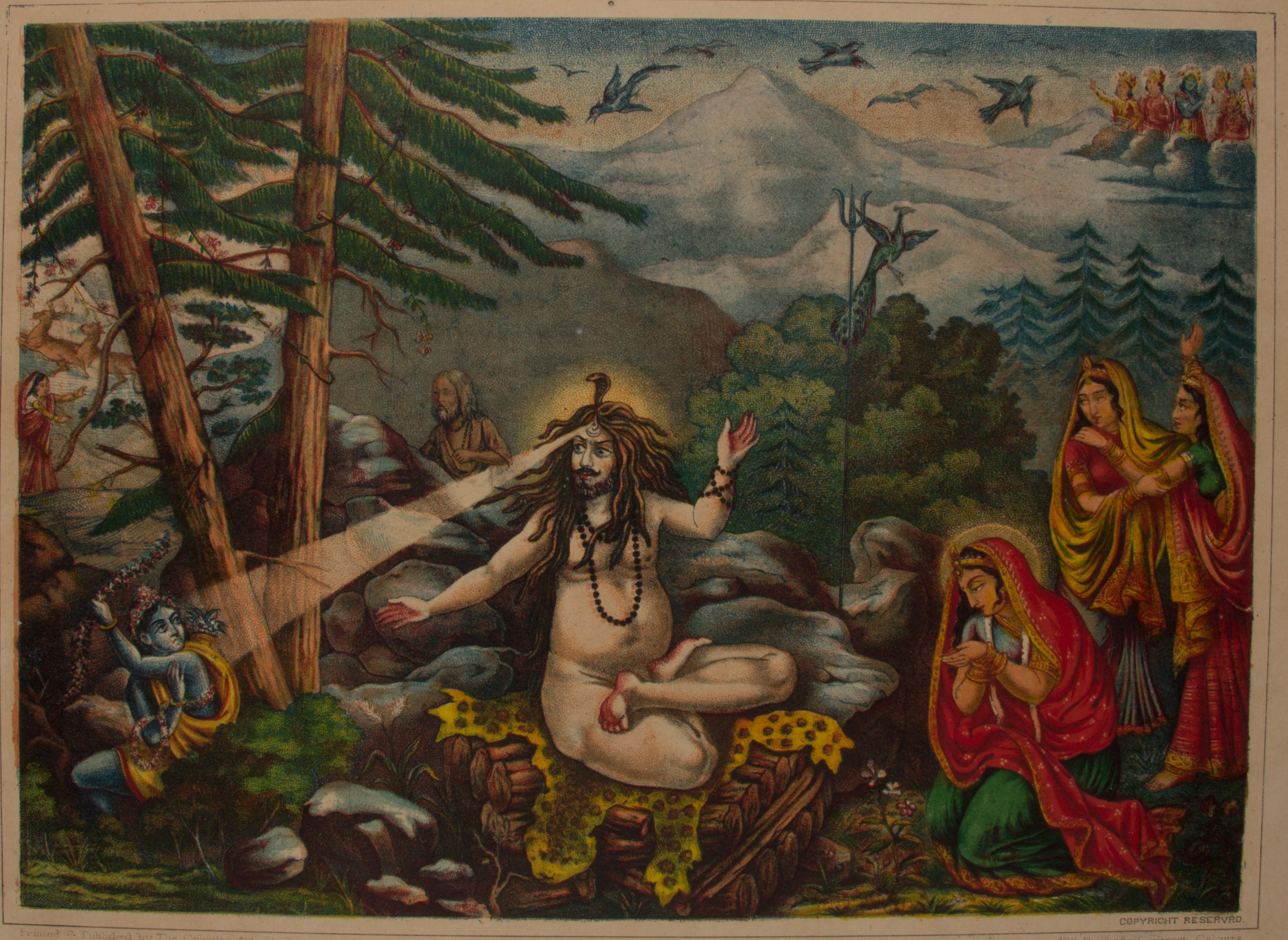
Kama Dahanam (Shiva Turns Kama to Ashes)

In Konkan region of Maharashtra, Holi season is also celebrated as Shimga or shimgo, festivities that lasts for almost a month. A week before the festival, youngsters go around the community, collecting firewood and money. On the day of holi, the firewood is heaped into a huge pile in each neighbourhood. In the evening, the fire is lit. Every household brings a meal and dessert, in the honour of the fire god. Puran Poli is the main delicacy and children shout "Holi re Holi puranachi poli". Shimga celebrates the elimination of all evil. The colour celebrations here take place on the day of Rang Panchami, five days after main day of holi. During this festival, people are supposed to forget and forgive any rivalries and start new healthy relations with all.

Traditional Dance of Men during Holi festival

==== Manipur ====
Manipuris celebrate Holi for 6 days. Here, this holiday merges with the festival of Yaosang. Traditionally, the festival commences with the burning of a thatched hut of hay and twigs. Young children go from house to house to collect money, locally known as nakadeng (or nakatheng), as gifts on the first two days. The youths at night perform a group folk dance called Thabal chongba on the full moon night of Lamta (Phalgun), traditionally accompanied by folk songs and rhythmic beats of the indigenous drum, but nowadays by modern bands and fluorescent lamps. In Krishna temples, devotees sing devotional songs, perform dances and celebrate with aber (gulal) wearing traditional white and yellow turbans. On the last day of the festival, large processions are taken out to the main Krishna temple near Imphal where several cultural activities are held. In recent decades, Yaosang, a type of Indian sport, has become common in many places of the valley, where people of all ages come out to participate in a number of sports that are somewhat altered for the holiday.

==== Odisha ====
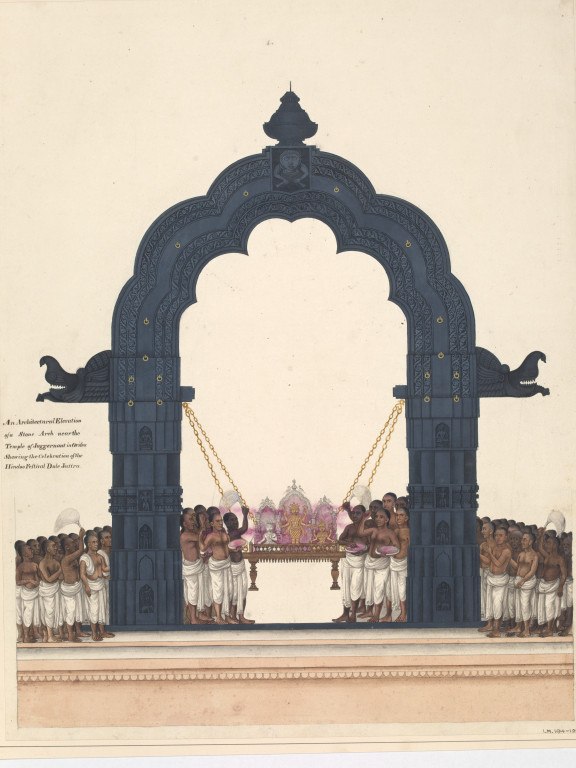
An 1822 drawing showing elevation of a black stone arch in Puri, Odisha. It carried Vaishnavite gods and goddess, the ritual noted to be a part of the Holi festival.

The people of Odisha celebrate Dola or Pushpadola (Dola Jatra purnima) on the day of Holi where the icons of Jagannath replace the icons of Krishna and Radha. Dola Melana, processions of the deities are celebrated in villages and bhoga is offered to the deities. "Dola yatra" was prevalent even before 1560 much before Holi was started where the idols of Jagannath, Balabhadra and Subhadra used to be taken to the "Dolamandapa" (podium in Jagannath temple). People used to offer natural colours known as "abira" to the deities and apply on each other's feats.

==== Punjab ====
In Punjab, the eight days preceding Holi are known as luhatak. Sekhon (2000) states that people start throwing colours many days before Holi.

Holi is preceded by Holika Dahan the night before when a fire is lit. Historically, the Lubana community of Punjab celebrated holi "with great pomp and show. The Lubanas buried a pice and betel nut. They heaped up cow-dung cakes over the spot and made a large fire. When the fire had burnt out, they proceeded to hunt for the pice and betel-nut. Whosoever found these, was considered very lucky." Elsewhere in Punjab, Holi was also associated with making fools of others. Bose writing in Cultural Anthropology: And Other Essays in 1929 noted that "the custom of playing Holi-fools is prevalent in Punjab".

On the day of Holi, people engage in throwing colours on each other. For locals, Holi marks the end of winter. The Punjabi saying Phaggan phal laggan (Phagun is the month for fructifying) exemplifies the seasonal aspect of Holi. Trees and plants start blossoming from the day of Basant and start bearing fruit by Holi.

During Holi in Punjab, walls and courtyards of rural houses are enhanced with drawings and paintings similar to rangoli in South India, mandana in Rajasthan, and rural arts in other parts of India. This art is known as chowk-poorana or chowkpurana in Punjab and is given shape by the peasant women of the state. In courtyards, this art is drawn using a piece of cloth. The art includes drawing tree motifs, flowers, ferns, creepers, plants, peacocks, palanquins, geometric patterns along with vertical, horizontal and oblique lines. These arts add to the festive atmosphere.

Folk theatrical performances known as swang or nautanki take place during Holi, with the latter originating in the Punjab. According to Self (1993), Holi fairs are held in the Punjab which may go on for many days. Bose (1961) states that "in some parts of Punjab, Holi is celebrated with wrestling matches".

==== Tripura ====
In Tripuri language spoken natively in Tripura, Holi is known as "Pali", which means colour. It is celebrated all over the state.

==== Uttarakhand ====
Kumaoni Holi in Uttarakhand includes a musical affair. It takes different forms such as the Baithki Holi, the Khari Holi and the Mahila Holi. In Baithki Holi and Khari Holi, people sing songs with a touch of melody, fun, and spiritualism. These songs are essentially based on classical ragas. Baithki Holi (बैठकी होली), also known as Nirvan Ki Holi, begins from the premises of temples, where Holiyars (होल्यार) sing Holi songs and people gather to participate, along with playing classical music. The songs are sung in a particular sequence depending on the time of day; for instance, at noon the songs are based on Peelu, Bhimpalasi and Sarang ragas, while evening songs are based on the ragas such as Kalyan, Shyamkalyan and Yaman. The Khari Holi (खड़ी होली) is mostly celebrated in the rural areas of Kumaon. The songs of the Khari Holi are sung by the people, who, sporting traditional white churidar payajama and kurta, dance in groups to the tune of ethnic musical instruments such as the dhol and hurka.

In the Kumaon region, the Holika pyre, known as Cheer (चीर), is ceremonially built in a ceremony known as Cheer Bandhan (चीर बंधन) fifteen days before Dulhendi. The Cheer is a bonfire with a green Paiya tree branch in the middle. The Cheer of every village and neighbourhood is rigorously guarded as rival mohallas try to playfully steal each other's cheer.

The colours used on Holi are derived from natural sources. Dulhendi, known as Charadi (छरड़ी) (from Chharad (छरड़)), is made from flower extracts, ash and water. Holi is celebrated with great gusto much in the same way all across North India.

==== West Bengal ====
In West Bengal, the tradition of Dol Jatra (meaning Swing procession) or Dolotsava (meaning Swing Festival) or Dol Purnima - (Swing Full Moon) is common among Gaudiya Vaishnavs just like among Vaishnavs in Braj region and other Krishna centric sampradays all over India. However, several Bengali Vaishnava padavalis also use the term Holi (Bangla: হোলী) for the festival.

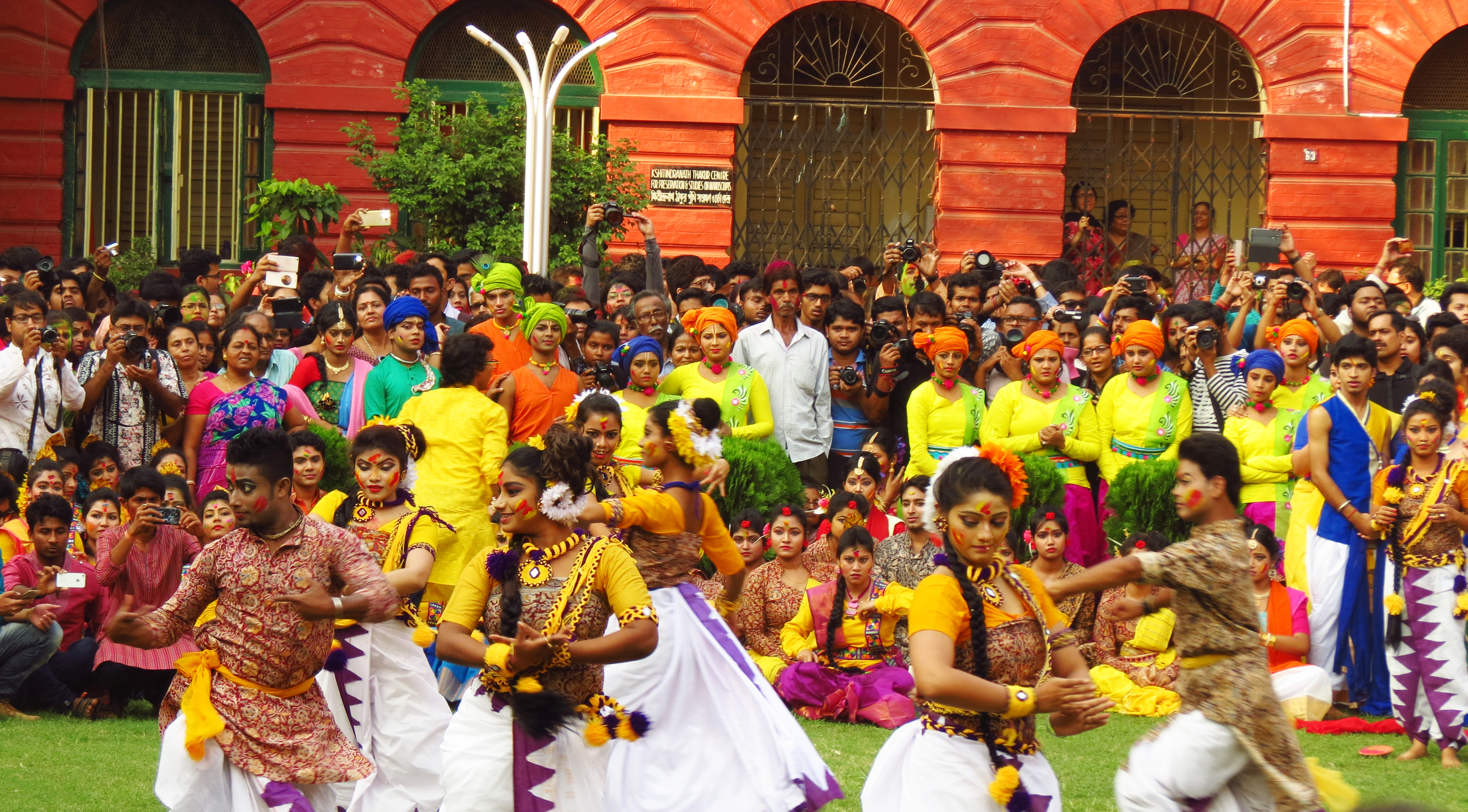
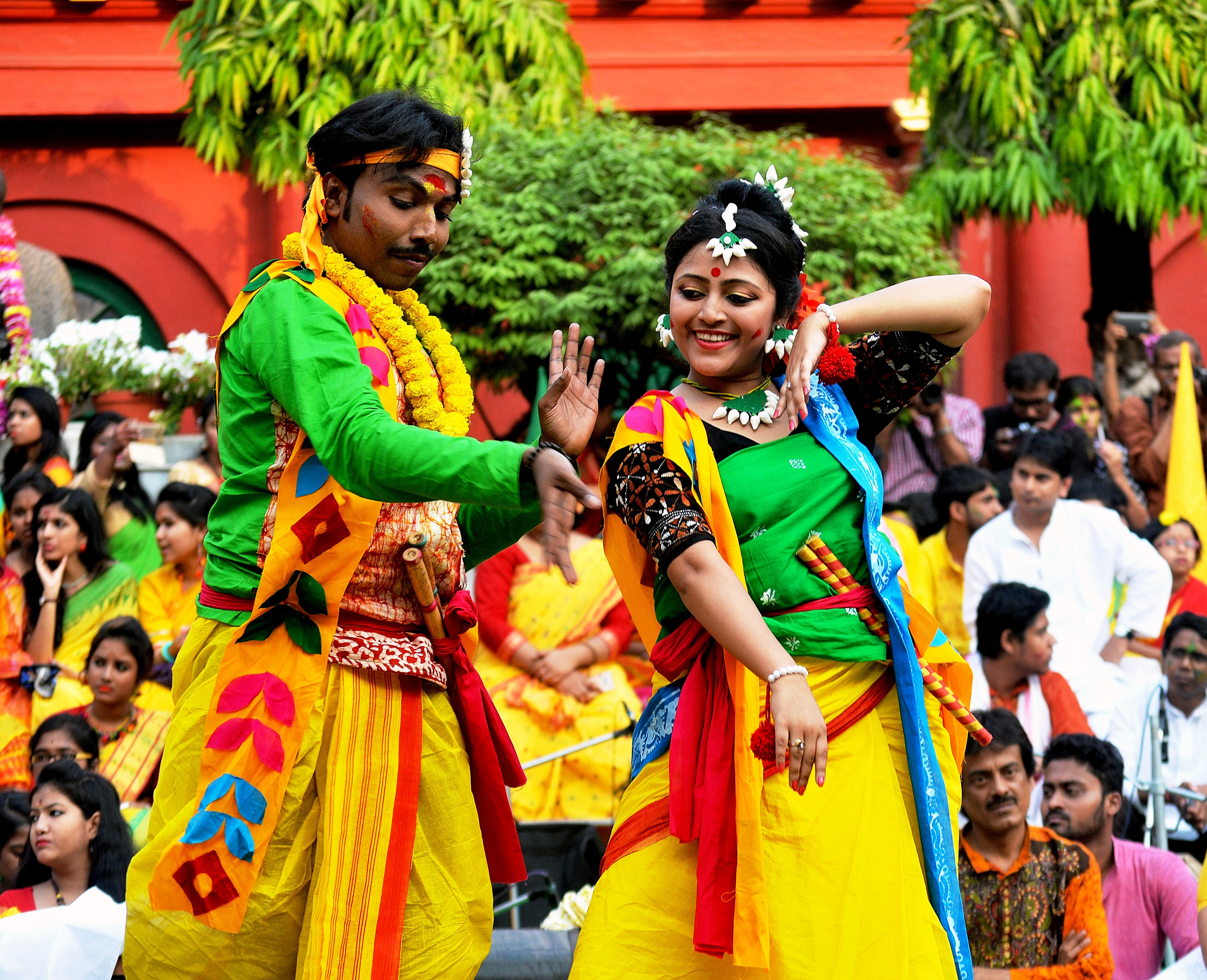
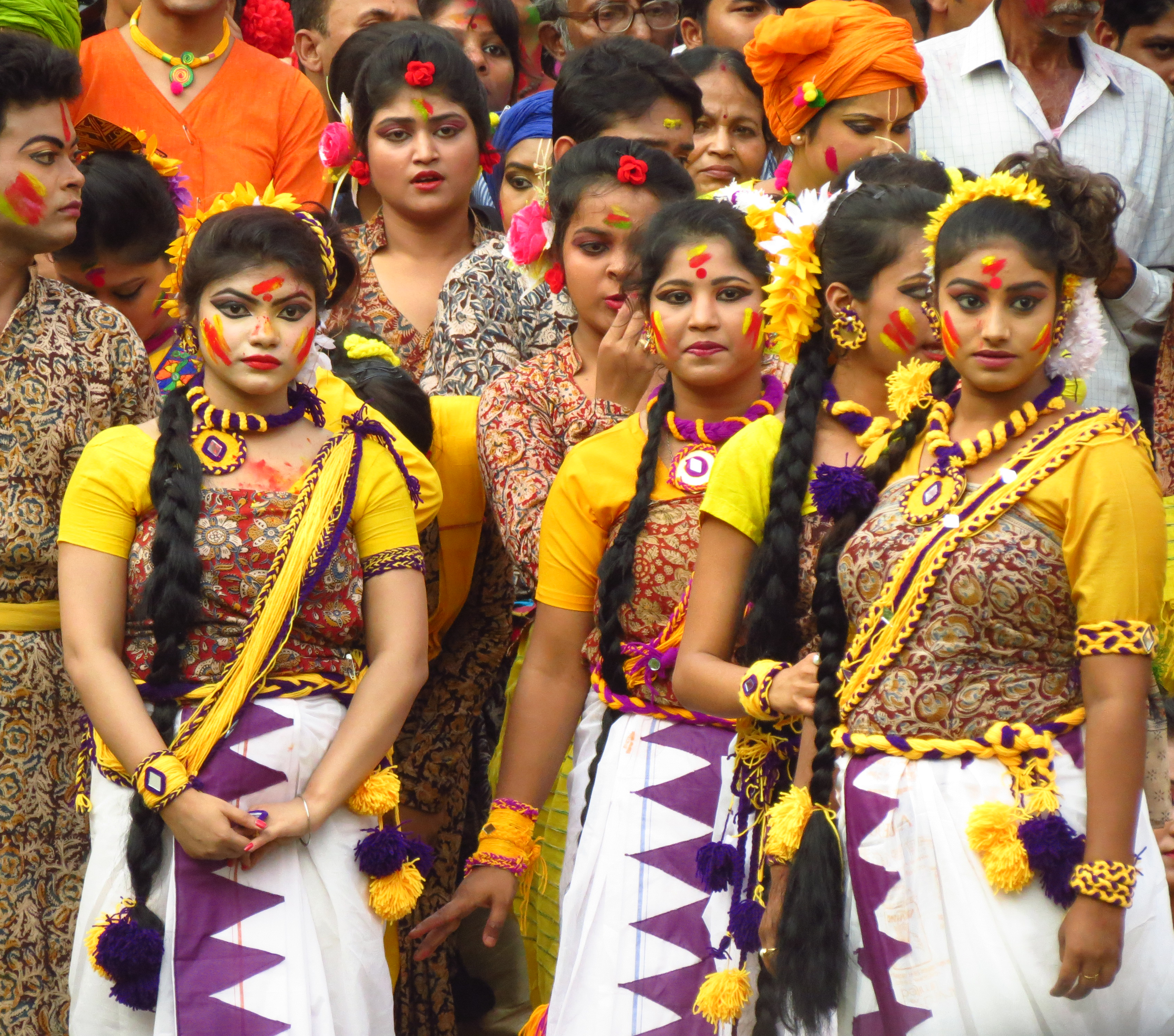
Left:A view of the Basanta Utsab celebration held in Jorasanko Thakurbari in 2016. Center:Basanta Utsav in Santiniketan, 2017. Right:Basanto Utsav Performers at the annual festival at Jorasanko Thakurbari in Kolkata.

In Shantiniketan, West Bengal, Holi is additionally also known as "Basanta Utsab". The festival is celebrated by worshipping the icons of Radha and Krishna by placing them on a decorated swing. On the Dol Purnima day in the early morning, students (mainly in Shantiniketan) dress up in saffron-coloured or pure white clothes and wear garlands of fragrant flowers. They sing and dance to the accompaniment of musical instruments, such as the ektara, dubri, and veena. The devotees take turns to swing them while women dance around the swing and sing songs. During these activities, the people keep throwing coloured water and dry colours, abir, at them.

Around 500 years ago, Sri Chaitanya Mahaprabhu went to Vrindavan in present-day Uttar Pradesh to witness the festival there at the birthplace of Lord Sri Krishna. After his return to Bengal, he thought of starting the festival here. So he asked his followers to smear color or abir to Lord Krishna's idol and then put that abir on each other. He also instructed them to give the other person a treat with a local sweet called malpoa. The biographies of Sri Chaitanya say that he was very fond of this sweet.

==== Western Uttar Pradesh ====
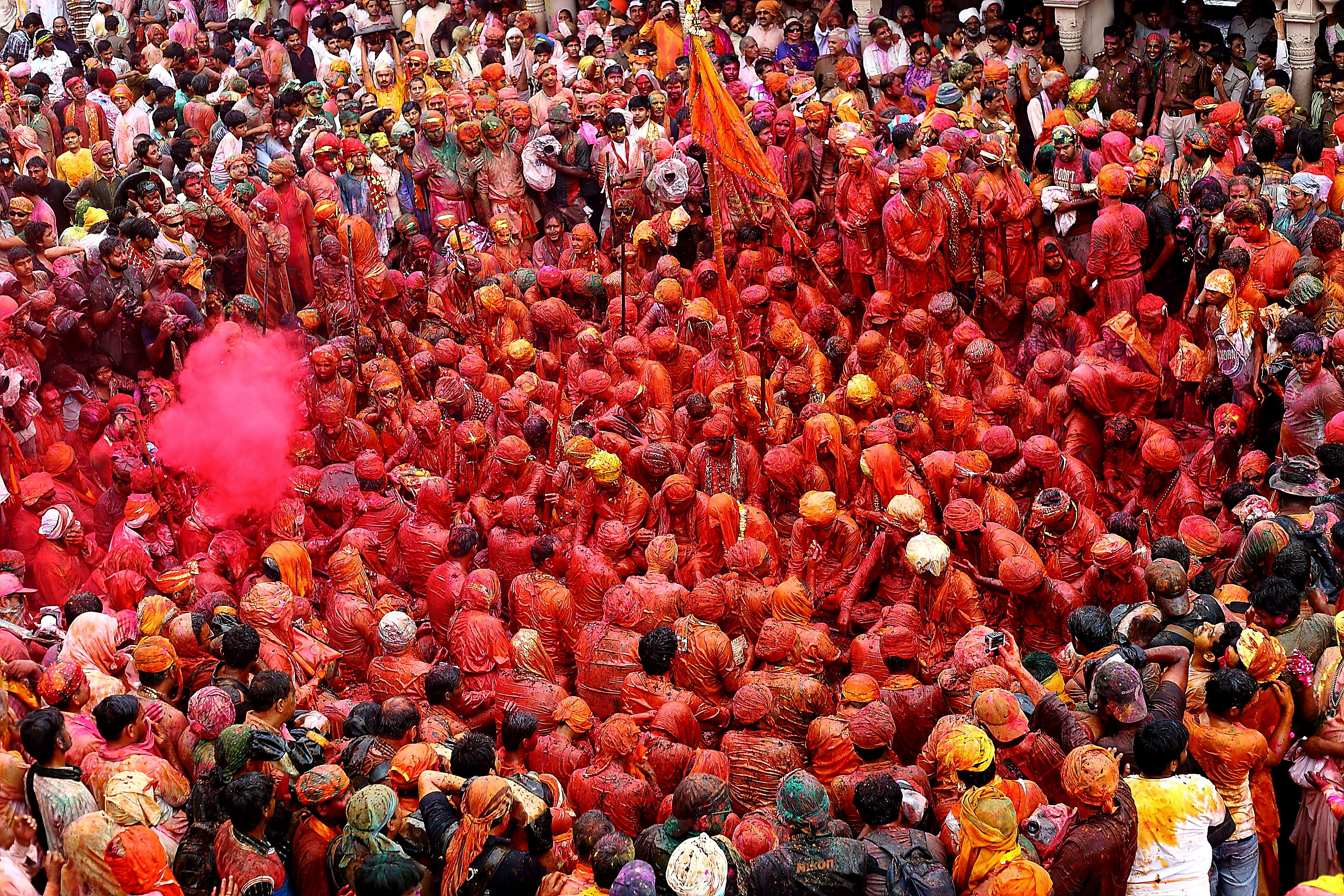
Colour drenched devotees in Radha Krishna Temple, Mathura, India

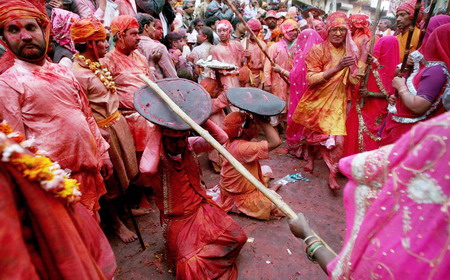
In the Braj region of North India, women have the option to playfully hit men who save themselves with shields; for the day, men are culturally expected to accept whatever women dish out to them. This ritual is called Lath Mar Holi.

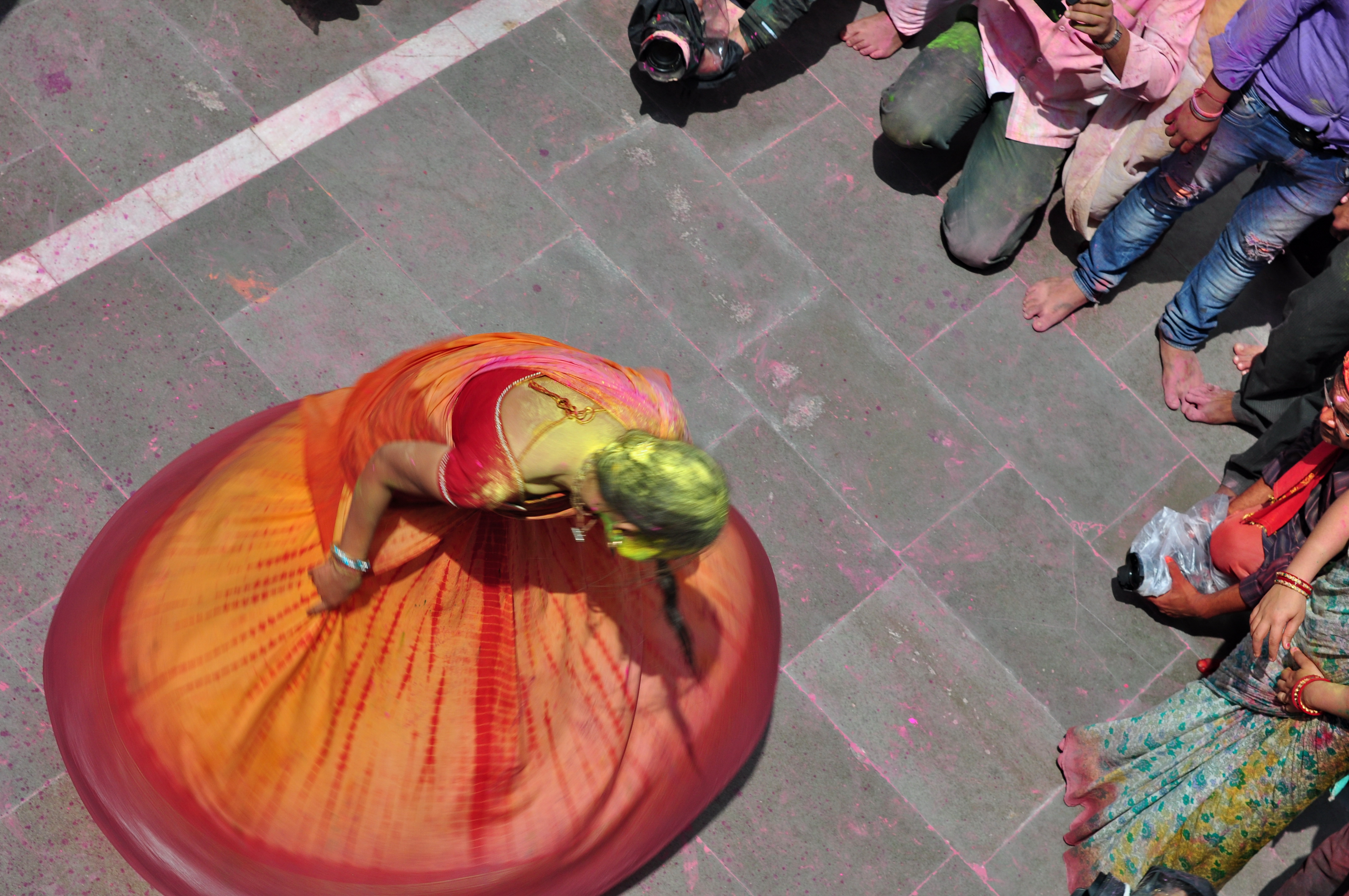
A play of colours then a dance at a Hindu temple near Mathura, at Holi

Barsana, a town near Mathura in the Braj region of Uttar Pradesh, celebrates Lathmar Holi in the sprawling compound of the Radha Rani Temple. Thousands gather to witness the Lath Mar Holi when women beat up men with sticks as those on the sidelines become hysterical, sing Holi songs and shout "Radhe Radhe" or "Sri Radhe Krishna". The Holi songs of Braj Mandal are sung in pure Braj, the local language. Holi celebrated at Barsana is unique in the sense that here women chase men away with sticks. Males also sing provocative songs in a bid to invite the attention of women. Women then go on the offensive and use long staves called lathis to beat the men, who protect themselves with shields.

Mathura, in the Braj region, is the birthplace of Krishna. In Vrindavan this day is celebrated with special puja and the traditional custom of worshipping Radha Krishna; here the festival lasts for sixteen days. All over the Braj region and neighbouring places like Hathras, Aligarh, and Agra, Holi is celebrated in more or less the same way as in Mathura, Vrindavan and Barsana.

A traditional celebration includes Matki Phod, similar to Dahi Handi in Maharashtra and Gujarat during Krishna Janmashtami, both in the memory of god Krishna who is also called makhan chor (literally, butter thief). This is a historic tradition of the Braj region as well as the western region of India. An earthen pot filled with butter or other milk products is hung high by a rope. Groups of boys and men climb on each other's shoulders to form pyramids to reach and break it, while girls and women sing songs and throw coloured water on the pyramid to distract them and make their job harder. This ritual sport continues in Hindu diaspora communities.

=== Pakistan ===
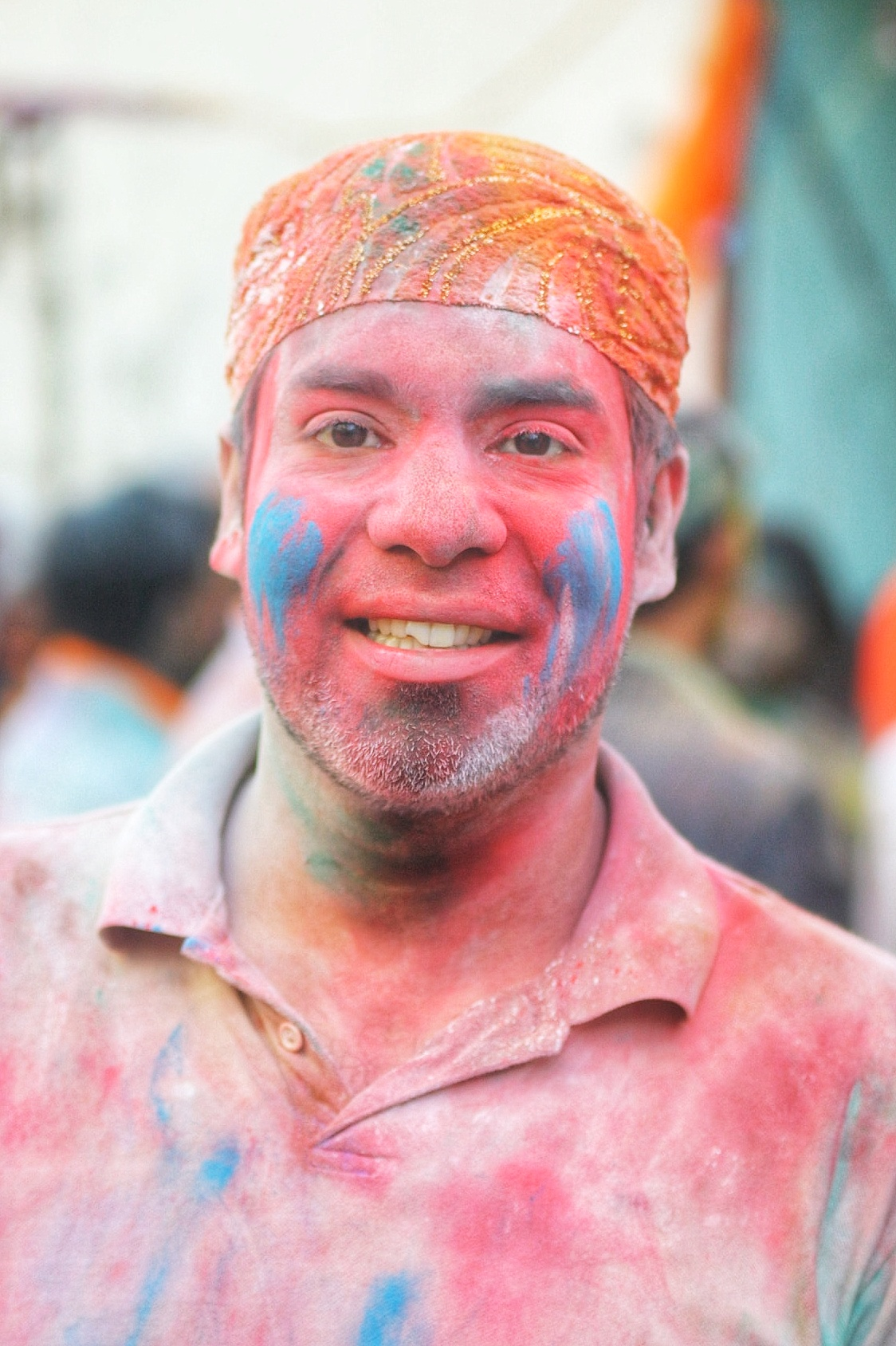
Faces smeared with Holi colours

Holi is celebrated by the minority Hindu population in Pakistan. Community events by Hindus have been reported by Pakistani media in various cities such as Karachi, Hazara, Rawalpindi, Sindh, Hyderabad, Multan and Lahore. The Hindu tribes of Cholistan play the game called Khido in the days leading up to the Holi. The game Khido is considered sacred by them as it is believed that Parhlad used to play this game during his childhood.

However, some cases have been reported where Hindus have been discriminated against and attacked while celebrating Holi in educational institutions.

Holi was not a public holiday in Pakistan from 1947 to 2016. Holi along with Diwali for Hindus, and Easter for Christians, was adopted as public holiday resolution by Pakistan's parliament in 2016, giving the local governments and public institutions the right to declare Holi as a holiday and grant leave for its minority communities, for the first time. This decision has been controversial, with some Pakistanis welcoming the decision, while others criticising it, with the concern that declaring Holi a public holiday advertises a Hindu festival to Pakistani children.

== Holi colours ==
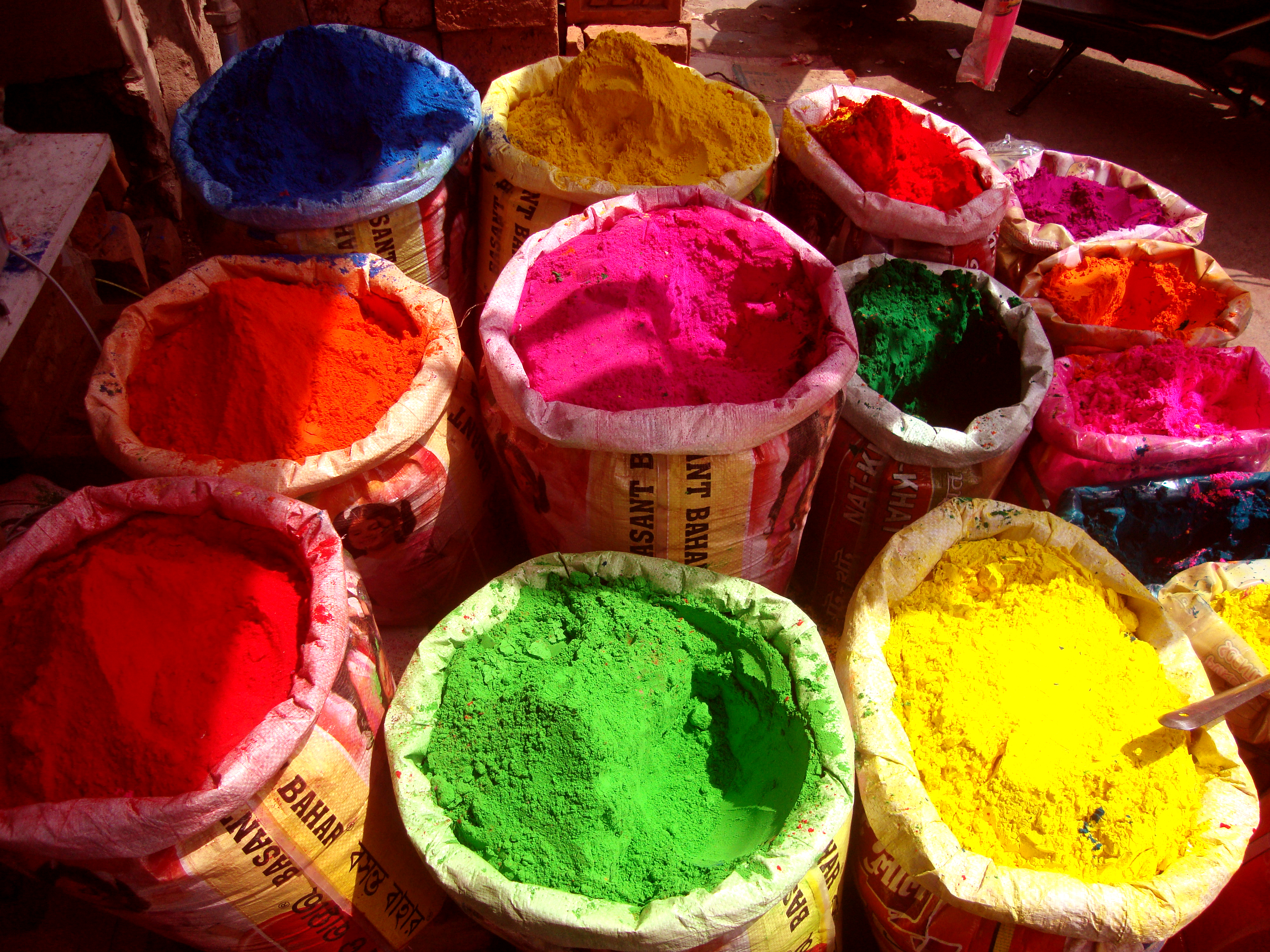
Colours for Holi on sale at a market in Mysore

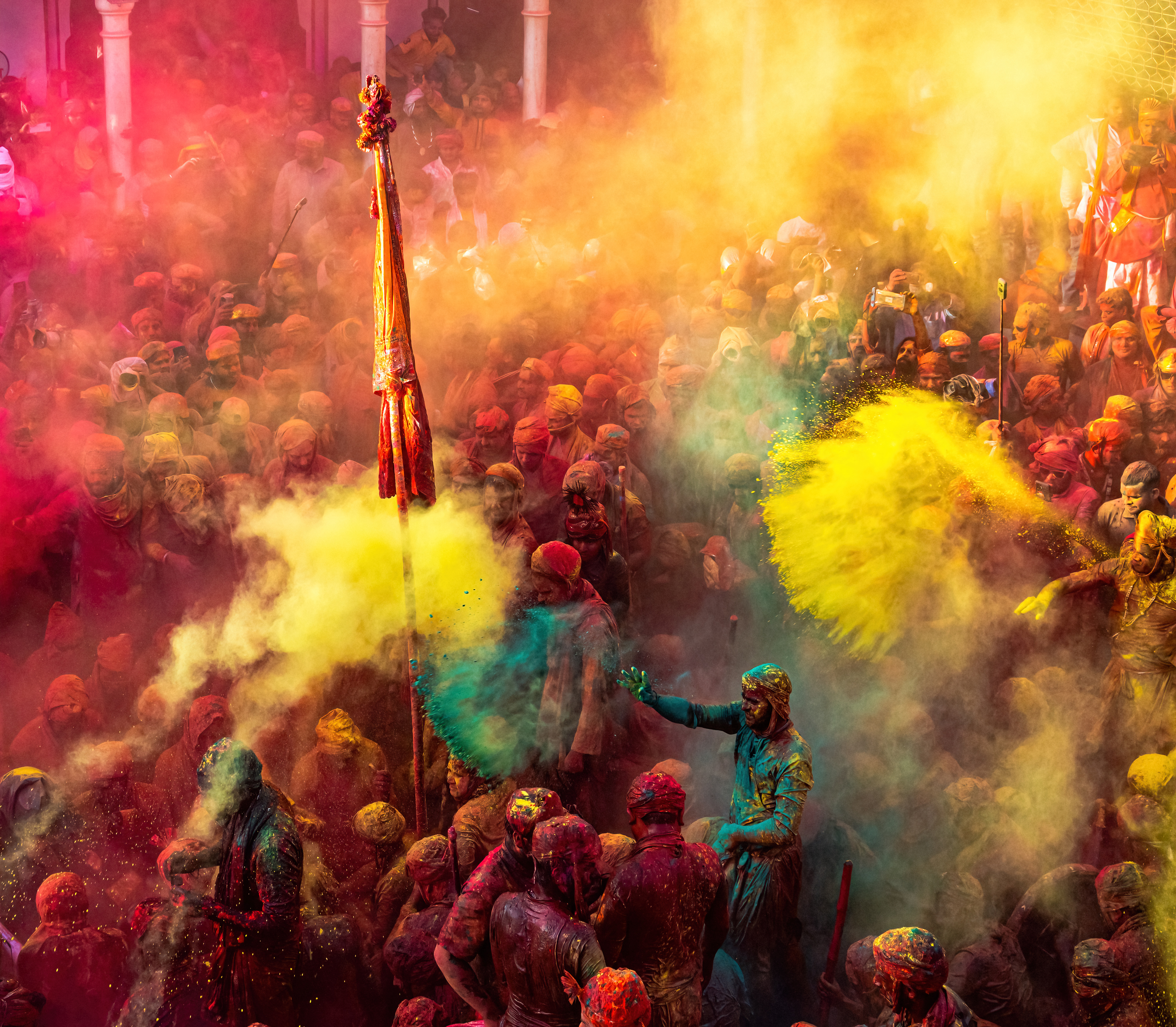
Celebrators at Lathmar Holi throwing colours.

=== Traditional sources of colours ===
The spring season, during which the weather changes, is believed to cause viral fever and cold. The playful throwing of natural coloured powders, called gulal has a medicinal significance: the colours are traditionally made of palash, neem, kumkum, haldi, bilva, and other medicinal herbs suggested by Āyurvedic doctors.

Many colours are obtained by mixing primary colours. Artisans produce and sell many of the colours from natural sources in dry powder form, in weeks and months preceding Holi. Some of the traditional natural plant-based sources of colours are:

==== Orange and red colour ====
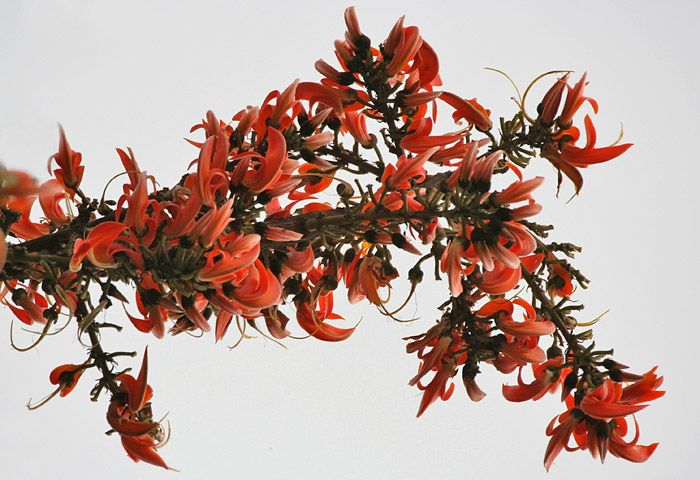
Flowers of Dhak or Palash are used to make traditional colours.

The flowers of palash or tesu tree, also called the flame of the forest, are typical source of bright red and deep orange colours. Powdered fragrant red sandalwood, dried hibiscus flowers, madder tree, radish, and pomegranate are alternate sources and shades of red. Mixing lime with turmeric powder creates an alternate source of orange powder, as does boiling saffron (kesar) in water.

==== Green colour ====
Mehendi and dried leaves of gulmohur tree offer a source of green colour. In some areas, the leaves of spring crops and herbs have been used as a source of green pigment.

==== Yellow colour ====
Haldi (turmeric) powder is the typical source of yellow colour. Sometimes this is mixed with chickpea (gram) or other flour to get the right shade. Bael fruit, amaltas, species of chrysanthemums, and species of marigold are alternate sources of yellow.

==== Blue colour ====
Indigo plant, Indian berries, species of grapes, blue hibiscus, and jacaranda flowers are traditional sources of blue colour for Holi.

==== Magenta and purple colour ====
Beetroot is the traditional source of magenta and purple colour. Often these are directly boiled in water to prepare coloured water.

==== Brown colour ====
Dried tea leaves offer a source of brown coloured water. Certain clays are alternate source of brown.

==== Black colour ====
Species of grapes, fruits of amla (gooseberry) and vegetable carbon (charcoal) offer grey to black colours.

== Influence on other cultures ==
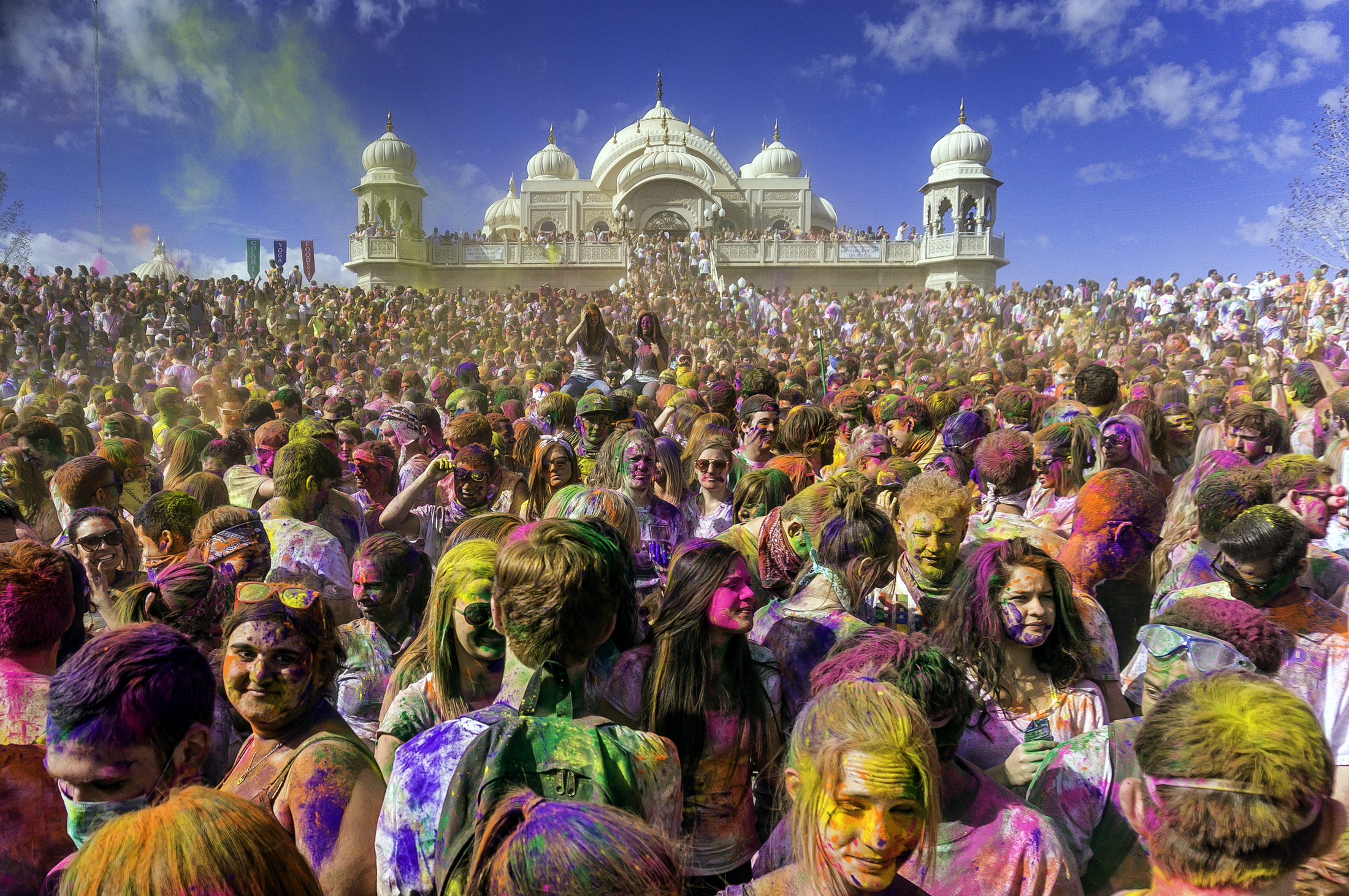
The Holi Festival in March 2013 at the Sri Sri Radha Krishna Temple in Utah County, Utah

Holi is celebrated as a social event in parts of the United States. For example, at Sri Sri Radha Krishna Temple in Spanish Fork, Utah, NYC Holi Hai in Manhattan, New York, and Festival of Colors: Holi NYC in New York City, New York.

=== Holi-inspired events ===
A number of Holi-inspired social events have also surfaced, particularly in Europe and the United States, often organised by companies as for-profit or charity events with paid admission, and with varying scheduling that does not coincide with the actual Holi festival. These have included Holi-inspired music festivals such as the Festival Of Colours Tour and Holi One (which feature timed throws of Holi powder), and 5K run franchises such as The Color Run, Holi Run and Color Me Rad, in which participants are doused with the powder at per-kilometre checkpoints. The BiH Color Festival is a Holi-inspired electronic music festival held annually in Brčko, Bosnia and Herzegovina.

== Issues ==
=== Health impact ===
A 2007 study found that malachite green, a synthetic bluish-green dye used in some colours during Holi festival, was responsible for severe eye irritation in Delhi, if eyes were not washed upon exposure. Though the study found that the pigment did not penetrate through the cornea, malachite green is of concern and needs further study.

Another 2009 study reports that some colours produced and sold in India contain metal-based industrial dyes, causing an increase in skin problems to some people in the days following Holi. These colours are produced in India, particularly by small informal businesses, without any quality checks and are sold freely in the market. The colours are sold without labelling, and the consumer lacks information about the source of the colours, their contents, and possible toxic effects. In recent years, several non-governmental organisations have started campaigning for safe practices related to the use of colours. Some are producing and marketing ranges of safer colours derived from natural sources such as vegetables and flowers.

These reports have galvanised a number of groups into promoting more natural celebrations of Holi. Development Alternatives, Delhi's CLEAN India campaign, Kalpavriksh Environment Action Group, Pune, Society for Child Development through its Avacayam Cooperative Campaign have launched campaigns to help children learn to make their own colours for Holi from safer, natural ingredients. Meanwhile, some commercial companies such as the National Botanical Research Institute have begun to market "herbal" dyes, though these are substantially more expensive than the dangerous alternatives. However, it may be noted that many parts of rural India have always resorted to natural colours (and other parts of festivities more than colours) due to availability.

In urban areas, some people wear nose masks and sunglasses to avoid inhaling pigments and to prevent chemical exposure to eyes.

=== Environmental impact ===
The use of heavy metal-based pigments during Holi is also reported to cause temporary wastewater pollution, with the water systems recovering to pre-festival levels within 5 days.

== See also ==
- Diwali
- Lathmar Holi
- Rang Panchami
- Dol Purnima
- Yaosang
- Songkran (Thailand) – Traditional Thai New Year's holiday, famous for ritualised public water fights
- Thingyan - Myanmar New Year Water Festival in mid-April
- Midsummer – Holiday held close to the summer solstice
- Nowruz – New Year's Day on the Iranian calendars
