= Shergarh, Uttar Pradesh =

Shergarh, Uttar Pradesh Shergarh
- Town
- Location in Uttar Pradesh, India Shergarh, Uttar Pradesh (India)
- Coordinates: 28.53°N 79.77°E
- Country: India
- State: Uttar Pradesh
- District: Bareilly
- Elevation: 254 m (833 ft)

Population (2001)
  - Total: 12,651

Languages
  - Official: Hindi
- Time zone: UTC+5:30 (IST)
- Vehicle registration: UP 25
- Website: up.gov.in

Shergarh is a town and a nagar panchayat in Bareilly district in the Indian state of Uttar Pradesh. It is a small town known for rice and sugarcane.

== Location ==
Shergarh is located about 7 miles west of Deoranian railway station situated on Lucknow-Kathgodam Railway line.

== History ==
Shergarh was originally called Kabar, and it was alternately a stronghold of the Katehria Rajputs and the Delhi Sultanate. Very little remains of the earliest periods of settlement. When Alexander Cunningham visited the site in 1863, all he found was a few coins from the 9th and 10th centuries and two small figurines. One was badly damaged and could not be identified, but the other was identified as Durga slaying the demon Mahishasura. According to tradition, Kabar first came under Muslim rule in 1313, under Alauddin Khalji; however, Amir Khusrau wrote that Kabar was first conquered by Jalal ud-Din Khalji in 1290. According to Amir Khusrau, the town was reconquered by the Hindus shortly after, but were then driven out by Jalal ud-Din's nephew. The Katehrias captured Kabar during the reign of Firuz Shah Tughlaq in the late 1300s, and it remained a stronghold of theirs until the 1500s.

In the 16th century, Sher Shah Suri decisively conquered Kabar and drove out the Katehrias. He built the Shergarh Fort to the east of Kabar, and the modern town grew up around this fort. The Khawas Tal tank, on the south side of Shergarh, is named after Khawas Khan, one of Sher Shah's generals.

Shergarh is mentioned in the Ain-i-Akbari, still under the old name of Kabar, as a pargana in the sarkar of Sambhal. It produced a revenue of 566,539 dams for the imperial treasury and a force of 400 infantry and 50 cavalry to the Mughal army.

Shergarh was founded by Shershah Suri in 1540.

== Demographics ==
As of 2011 India census, Shergarh had a population of 14,687. Males constitute 53% of the population and females 47%. Shergarh has an average literacy rate of 72%, lower than the national average of 74%: male literacy is 80%, and female literacy is 68%. In Shergarh, 13% of the population is under 6 years of age.

== See also ==
- Krishna Janmasthan Temple Complex
- Ram Janmabhoomi, Rama's birthplace
- Janakpur Dham, Sita's birthplace in Nepal
- Punaura Dham, Sita's birthplace in India
- Kundinapuri, Rukmini's birthplace
- Kaundinyapur, near Nagpur and associated with Rukmini's birthplace Kundinapuri
- Raval, Mathura, Radha's birthplace
- Parikrama
- Yatra
