= Lathmar Holi =

Hindu festival in Uttar Pradesh, India

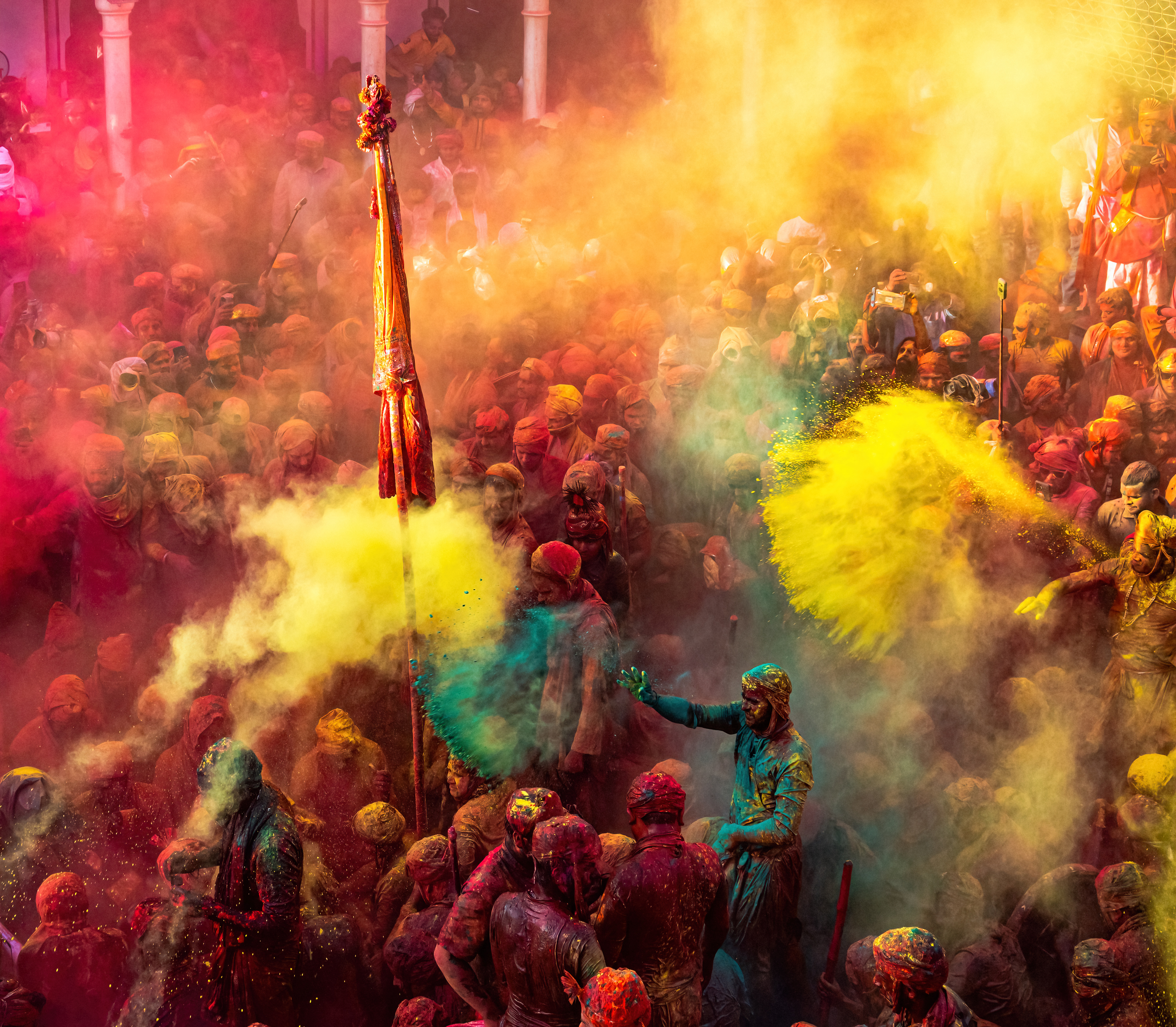
- Lathmar Holi in Nandgaon
- Observed by: Hindus
- Type: Religious, Cultural, Spring festival
- Celebrations: Spraying colour powders, Playfully hurling sticks by women of Barsana on men of Nandgaon, Dancing, Greetings, Festival delicacies
- Frequency: Annual
- Started by: Radha Krishna
- Related to: Holi

Lathmar Holi (Holi of sticks) is a Hindu festival celebrated in the twin towns of Barsana and Nandgaon, also known as the towns of Radha and Krishna respectively. Every year, during the period of Holi, thousands of devotees and tourists visit these towns to celebrate the festival. The festivities usually last for more than a week and ends on Rang Panchami.

== Origins ==
Associated with legend that is linked to the divine couple Radha Krishna, the festival seeks to recreate it. According to the legend, Lord Krishna who was resident of Nandgaon and considered as the son-in-law of Vrishabhanu wanted to spray the colors on his beloved Radha and her friends. But, as Krishna and his friends entered Barsana, they were playfully greeted with the sticks by Radha and her friends who drove them out of Barsana. Following the same trend, every year on the occasion of Holi, the men of Nandagaon who are treated as sons-in-law of Barsana visit Barsana and are greeted by women with colors and sticks (aka lathi). The celebration is enacted in perfect good humor by both the sides, men of Nandgaon and women of Barsana.

== Gallery ==
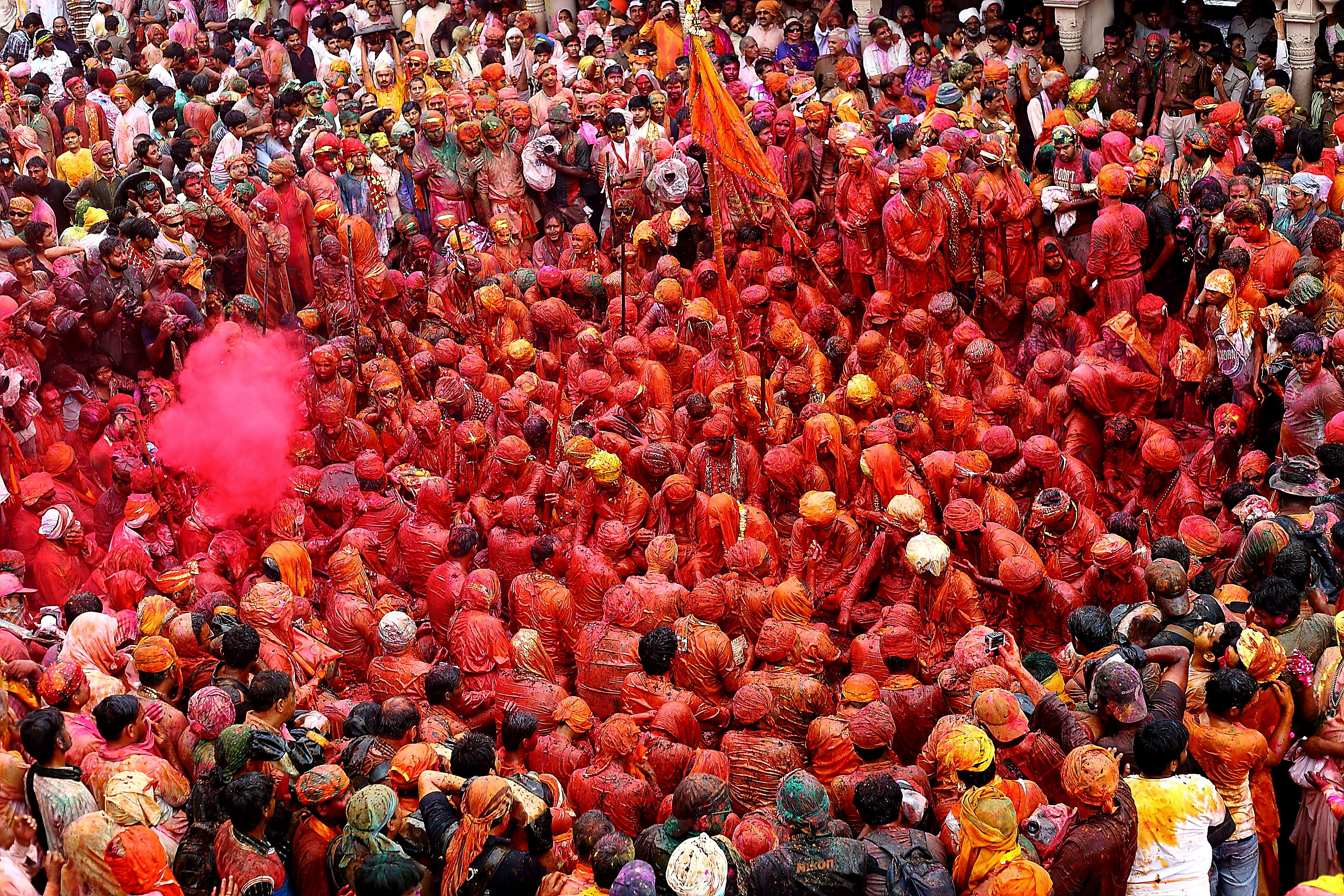
Color Drenched people in Krishna Temple

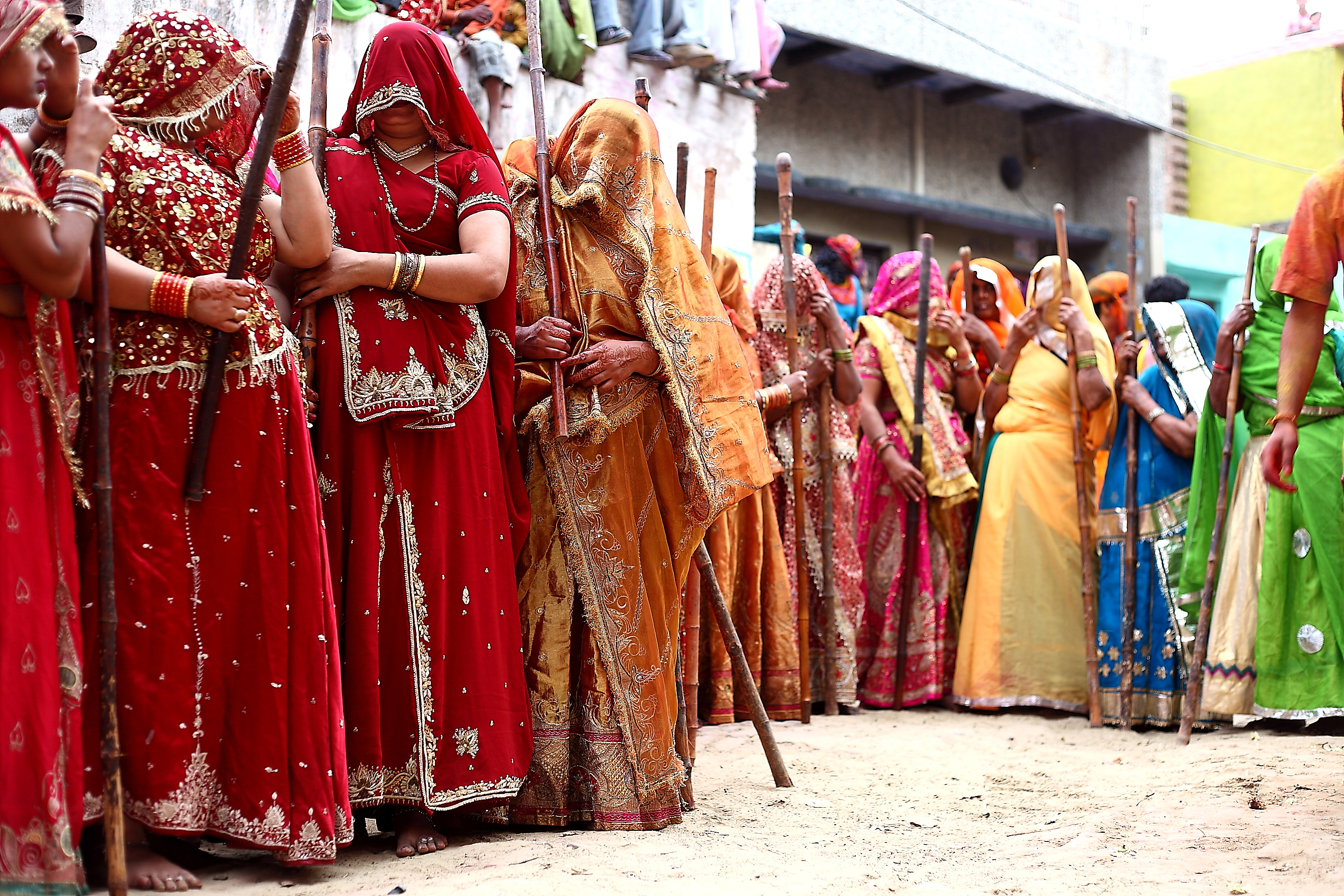
Women waiting for men during lathmar

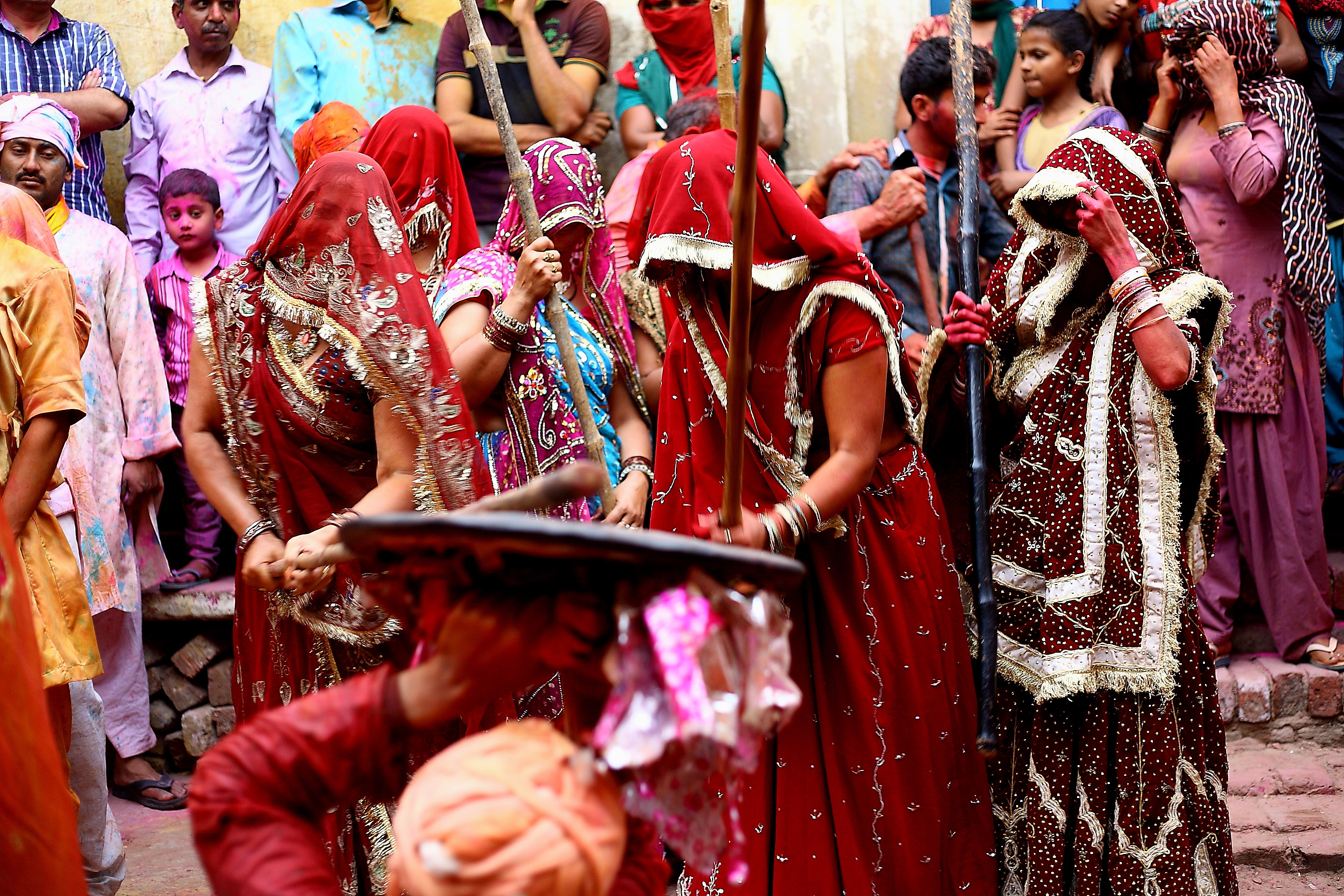
Women using lathis

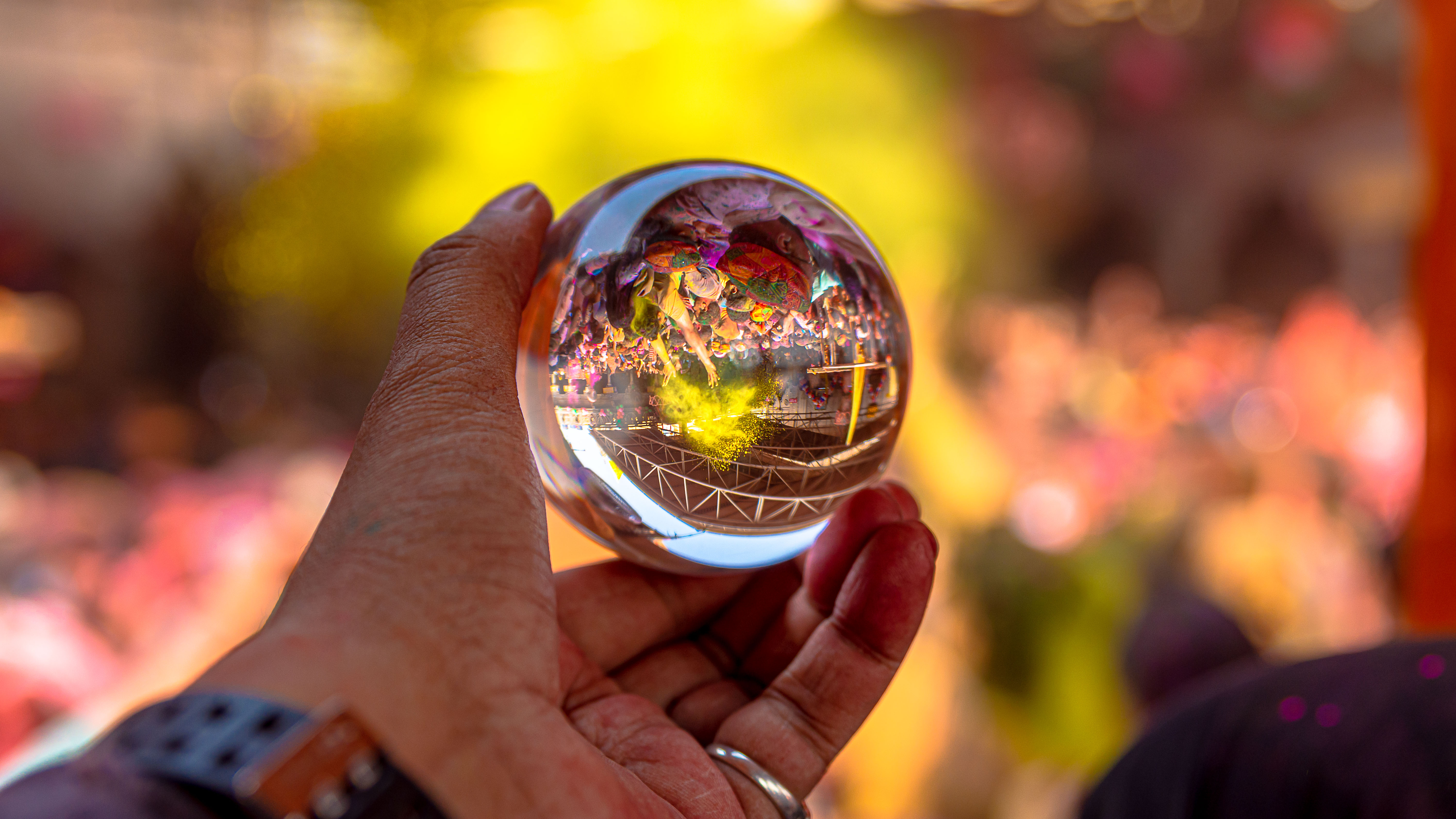
Image depicting celebration of color in Barasana

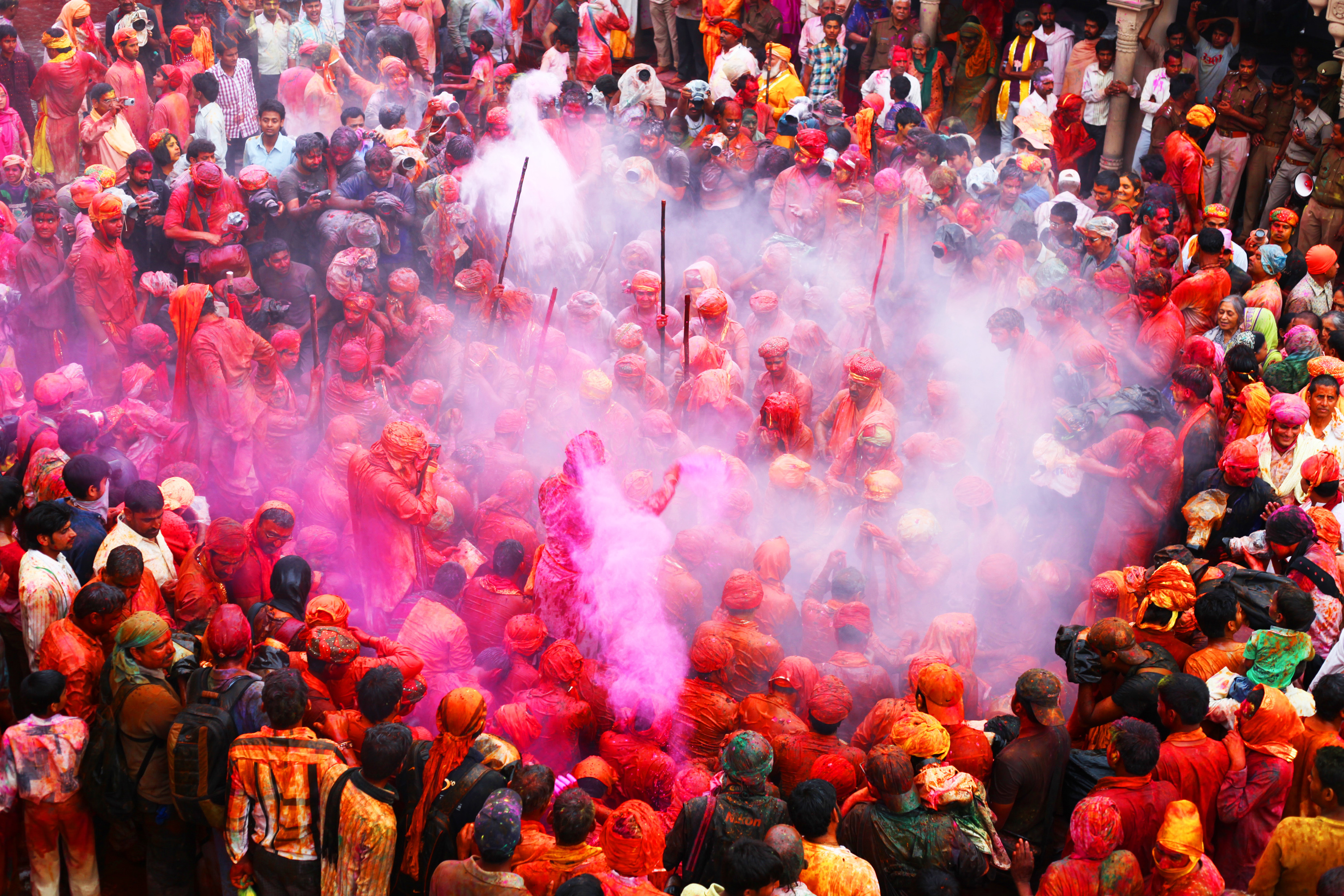
Holi at Radha Rani Temple, Barsana

== See also ==
- Holi
- Radha Krishna
- Barsana
- Nandgaon
- Radha Rani Temple
