= DRN =

DRN or Drn may refer to:

- Dark Room Notes, a band originally from Galway, Ireland
- Deoranian railway station, serving Deoranian, Uttar Pradesh, India (Indian railways code DRN)
- Dirranbandi Airport, Queensland, Australia (IATA code DRN)
- Disaster Resource Network, a World Economic Forum initiative
- Dorsal raphe nucleus, on the brainstem
- Dragonfly Recording Network, a project of the British Dragonfly Society
- Drn (Prague), a polyfunctional building in Prague, Czech Republic
- Duirinish railway station, Highland, Scotland (National Rail station code DRN)
- Duren Kalibata railway station, Jakarta, Indonesia

== See also ==
- Dharan, Nepal
