= Radhashtami =

Hindu festival

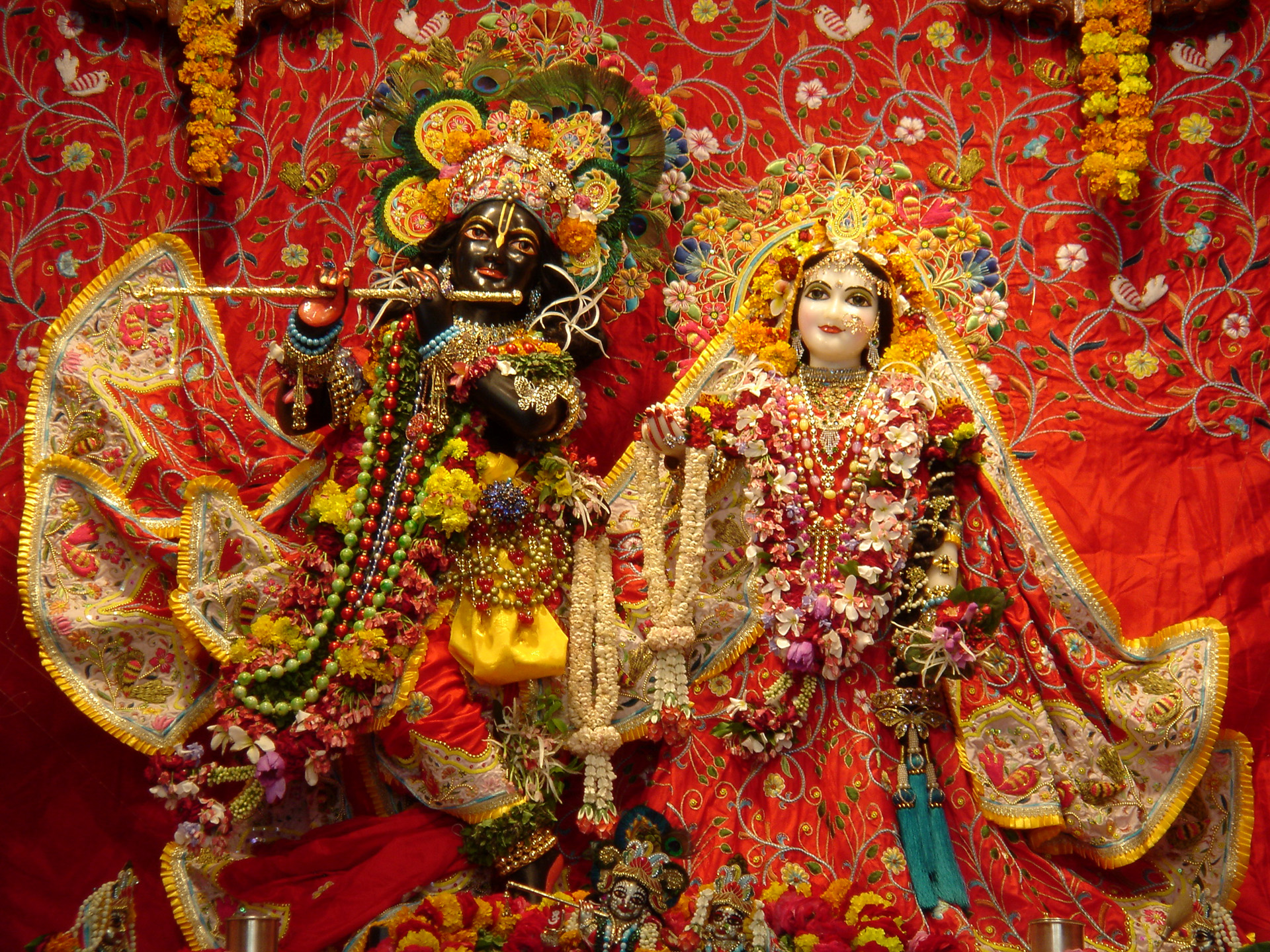
- Radhashtami celebration at ISKCON Temple, Vrindavan
- Also called: Radha Ashtami, Radha Jayanti
- Observed by: Hindus
- Type: Religious, Cultural
- Significance: Commemorating the birth anniversary of the goddess Radha
- Celebrations: Noontime Sringara in temples, Aarti, Manimahesh Yatra
- Date: Eighth day of the bright fortnight in the month of Bhadrapada
- 2025 date: 31 August (Sunday)
- 2026 date: 19 September (Saturday)
- 2027 date: 8 September (Wednesday)
- Frequency: Annual

Radhashtami (Sanskrit: राधाष्टमी) is a Hindu festival commemorating the birth anniversary of the goddess Radha, the chief consort of the god Krishna. It is celebrated in her birthplace, Barsana and the entire Braj region on the eighth day (ashtami) of the bright fortnight (Shukla Paksha) in the month of Bhadrapada in Anuradha Nakshatra at 12 noon in town of Barsana (Rawal), Uttar Pradesh, India. As per the Gregorian calendar, her birth date was believed to be 23 September 3221 BC - a Wednesday. Radhashtami falls fifteen days after Krishna Janmashtami.

In Vaishnavism, Radha is revered to as the eternal consort of Krishna and worshipped for her unconditional love and unwavering devotion towards him. The festival of Radhashtami suggests that goddess Radha is a significant aspect of the cultural-religious faith system, governing the social life of people.

== History ==
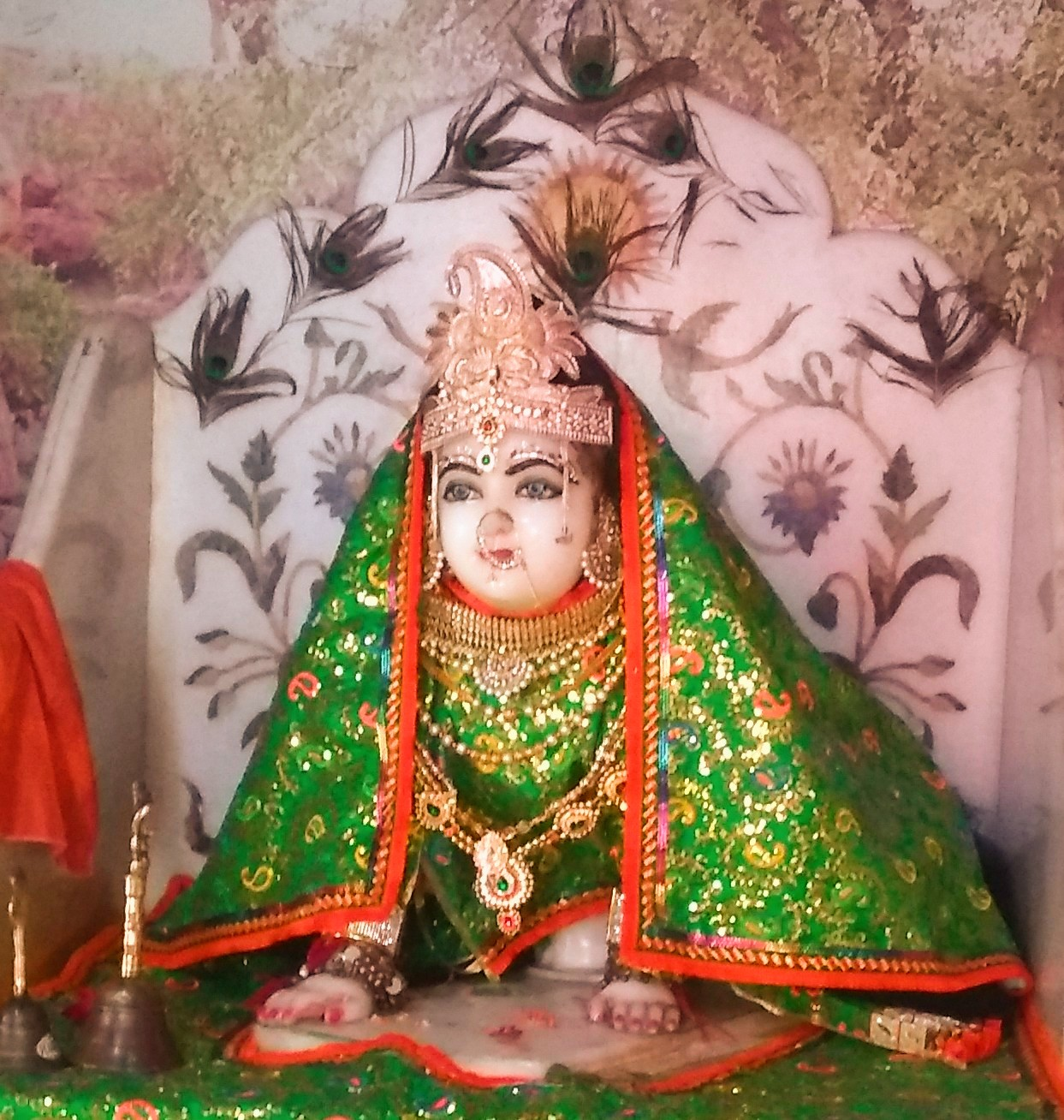
Bal Radha in Shri Laadli Lal temple, Rawal

The Chapter 7 of Bhumi Khanda of the Sanskrit scripture Padma Purana (Volume 5) provides the detailed information and rituals related to the festival of Radhashtami.

In the Viṣṇu Khaṇḍa of the Skanda Purana, it is mentioned that God Krishna had 16,000 gopis out of which Goddess Radha was the most prominent one. Goddess Radha was found on the golden lotus in the pond by king Vrishabhanu and his wife Kirtida. As per folktales, Radha did not open her eyes to see the world until Krishna himself appeared in front of her.

== Radhashatami ==
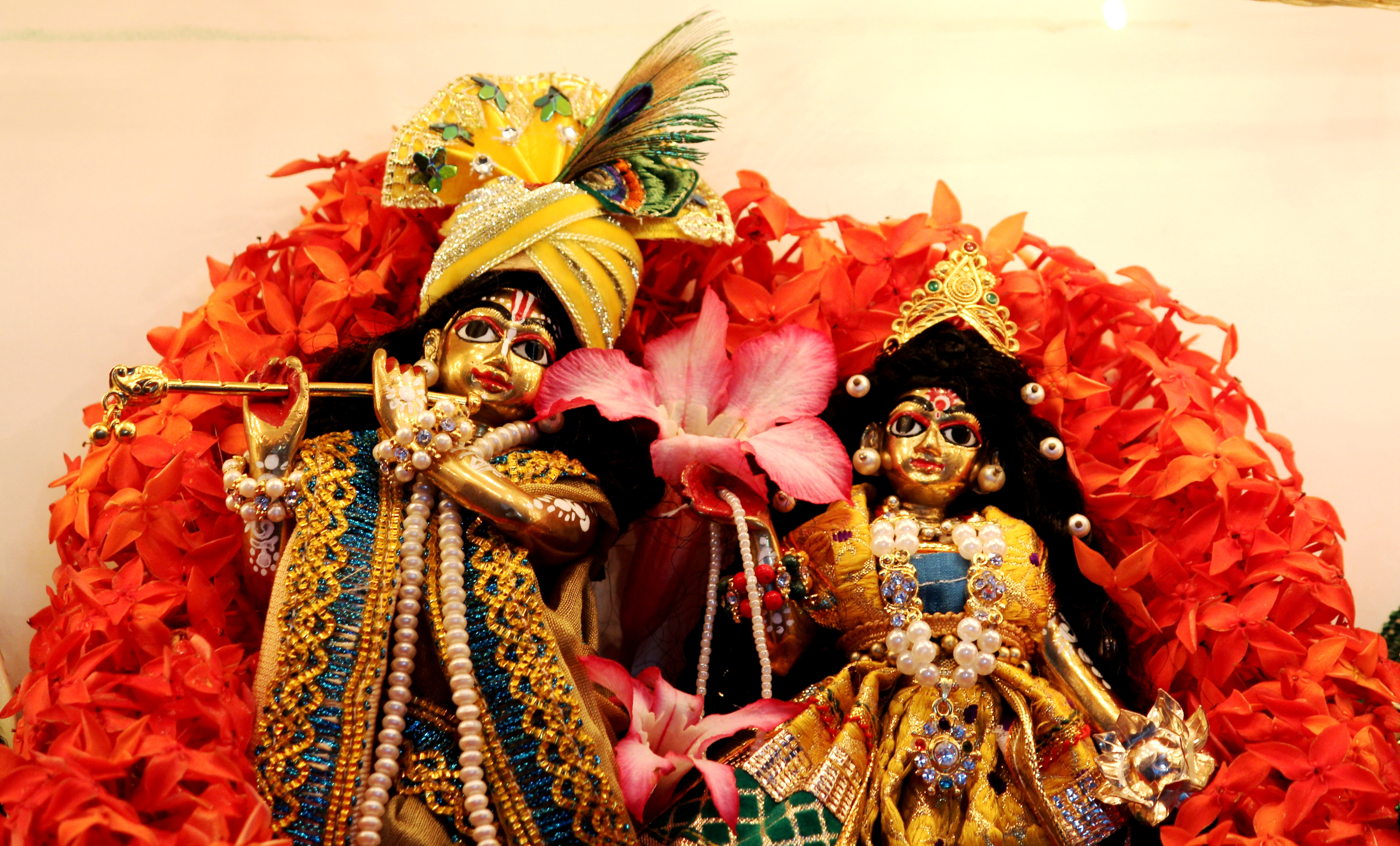
Idols of Radha Krishna decorated on Radhashtami

Radhashtami is celebrated in various temples associated with traditions - Radha Vallabh Sampradaya, Gaudiya Vaishnavism, Nimbarka Sampradaya, Pushtimarg and Haridasi Sampradaya. In the Radha Vallabh Temple, Vrindavan and Seva kunj, celebrations last for nine days. Rituals involve organizing a procession of Radha and Krishna, distribution of food and clothes, music and dance.

Traditionally, followers of Gaudiya Vaishnavism (which includes ISKCON devotees) and devotees of goddess Radha observe the Radha Ashtami Vrat (fast). Devotees usually follow a half-day fast on this day. But, like ekadashi, some devotees observe this fast for full day and some even without water. In ISKCON temples mahabhishek (a bathing ritual) of Radharani is done on this day.

Radhashtami is ceremoniously celebrated in the Braj area. On Radhashtami, Radha Krishna idols are traditionally dressed entirely in flowers. Additionally, Radhashtami is the only day on which devotees may receive darshan (viewing) of Radha's feet. On all other days, they remain covered.

Radhashtami begins with a ritual bath. In homes and temples, idol of goddess Radha is bathed with panchamitra - a combination of five different food mixes of milk, ghee, honey, sugar/jaggery and yogurt and then she is dressed in new attire. Braj cuisines like Panchamrit are also prepared as an offering. She is then offered bhog (food). On this day, devotees sing devotional songs in praise of the divine couple Radha Krishna and their pastimes. Later, feast is served as prasada to celebrate this day.

The mantras which are chanted on Radhashtami are: Aum Vrashbahnujaye Vidmahe, Krishnapriyaye Dheemahi Tanno Radha Prachodaya (Radha Gayatri Mantra) and Radhe Radhe.

== Significance ==
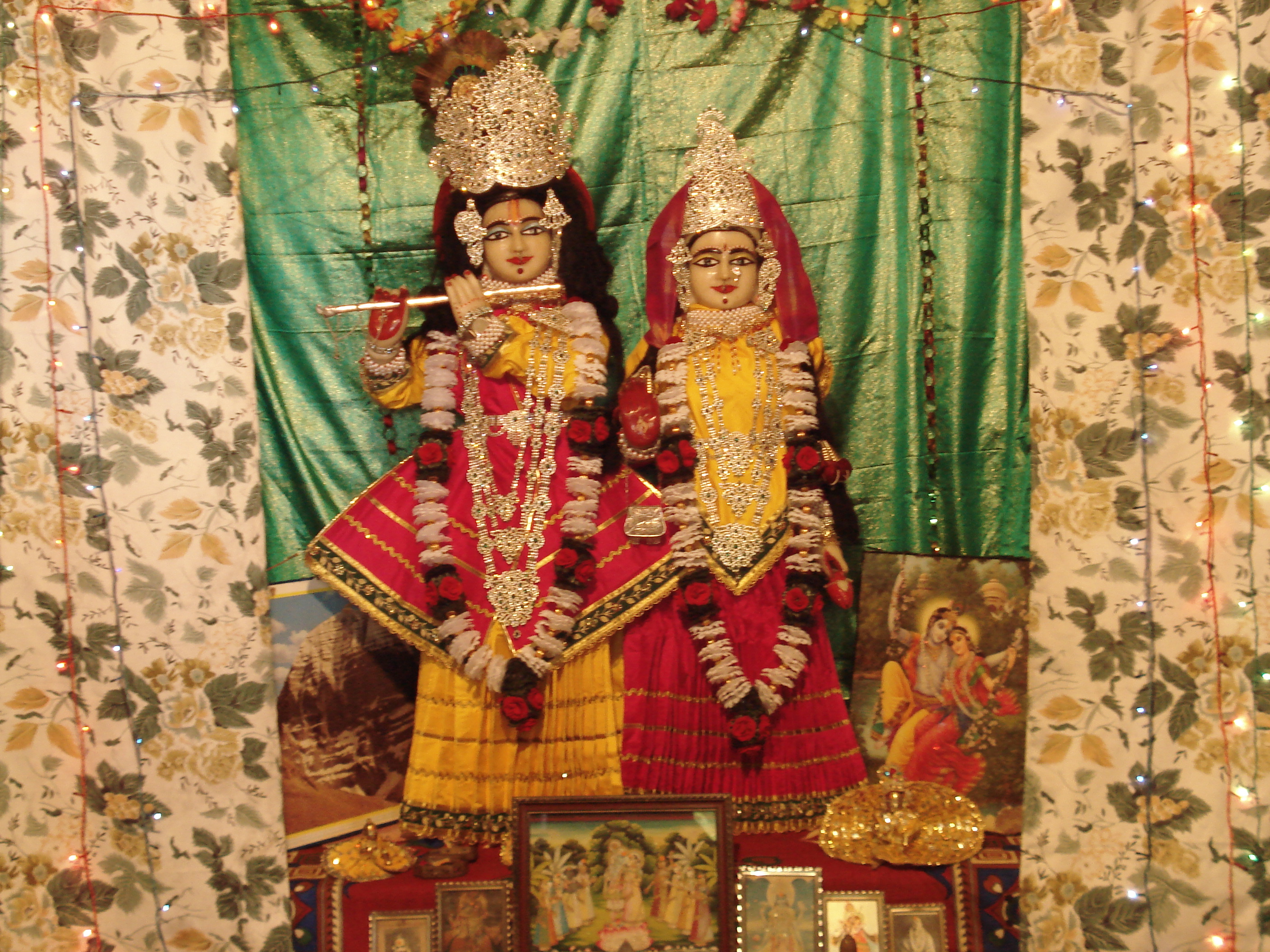
Radha Krishna idols on Radhashtami in temple of Vrindavan

Radhashtami is particularly important for the holy pilgrimage to Manimahesh Lake, called Manimahesh Yatra, which is sponsored by the Government of Himachal Pradesh. It is preceded by the "holy chhari", (holy stick carried by the pilgrims on their shoulders). The pilgrims barefooted, singing and dancing to the hymns of God Shiva, undertake this trek of 14 kilometres (8.7 mi) from the nearest road point of Hadsar, to the Manimahesh Lake. The Manimahesh Yatra that starts from Krishna Janmashtami, ends after fifteen days with Radhashtami.

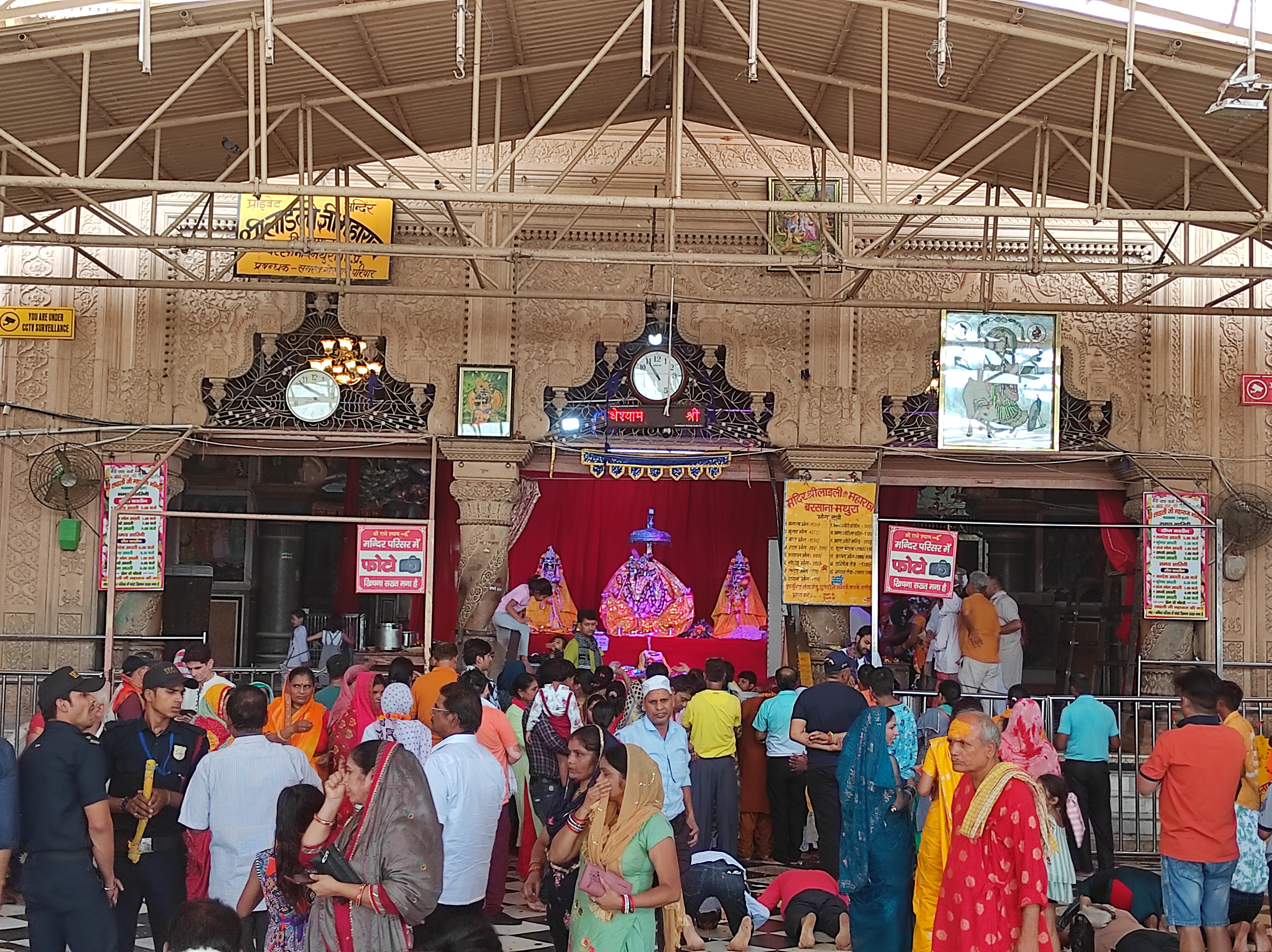
Inside view of Radharani temple, also called Shreeji temple, Barsana.

== See also ==
- Krishna Janmashtami
- Radha Rani Temple
