= Radha Rani Temple =

Hindu temple dedicated to Radha Krishna in Barsana

Shri Radha Rani Temple
- Shreeji Temple, Shri Laadli Lal Temple
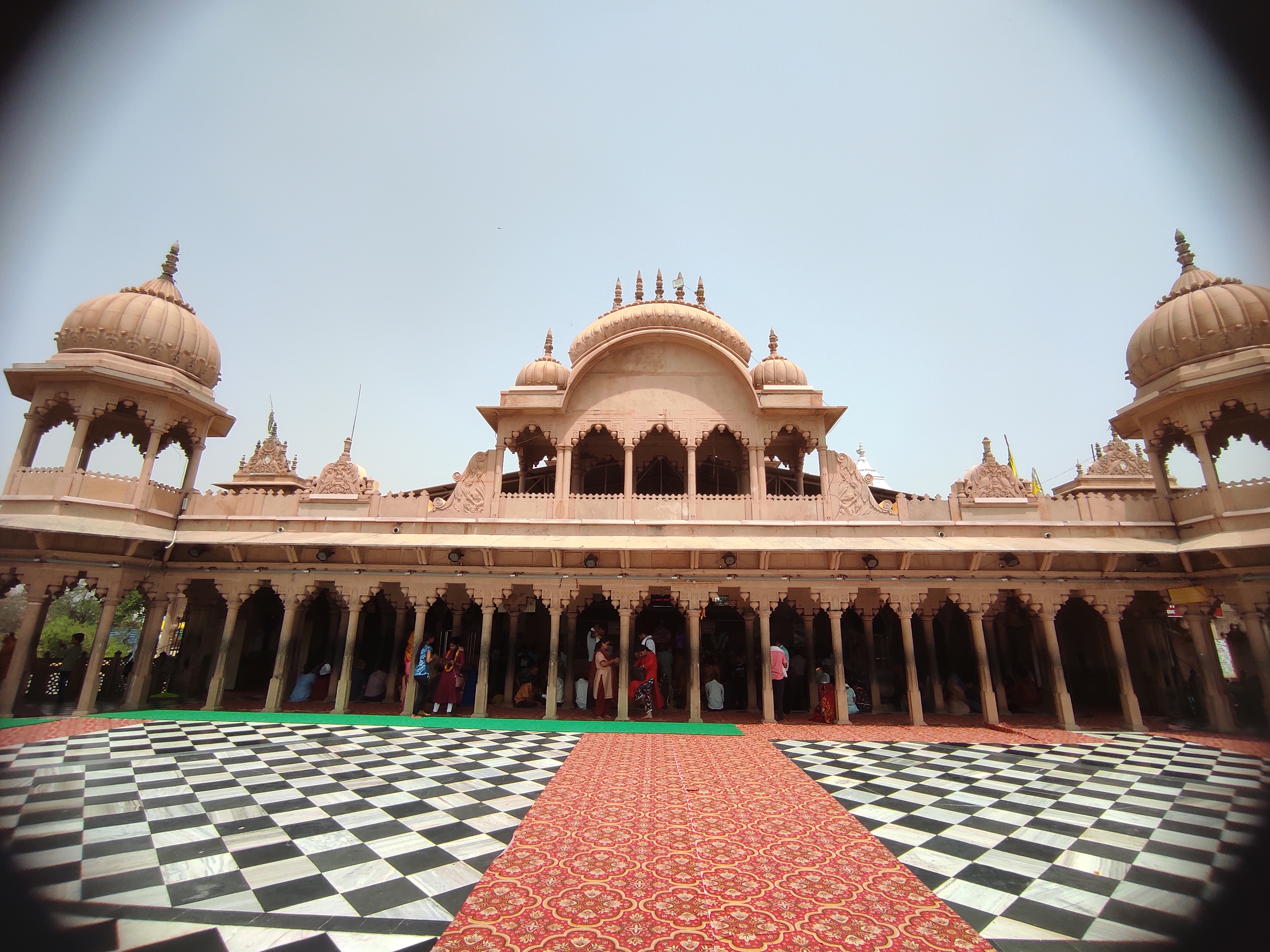
- Radharani Temple, Barsana

- Location in Uttar Pradesh

Religion
- Affiliation: Hinduism
- District: Mathura
- Deity: Radha Krishna
- Festivals: Radhashtami, Janmashtami, Lathmar Holi, Holi, Sharad Purnima, Kartik Purnima

Location
- Location: Barsana
- State: Uttar Pradesh
- Coordinates: 27°39′01″N 77°22′25″E

Architecture
- Founder: Raja Bir Singh Deo, Narayan Bhatt, Raja Todarmal, King Vajranabh
- Completed: 1675 AD
- Elevation: 250 m (820 ft)

Website
- radharanimandir.com

Shri Radha Rani Temple, is a historical Hindu temple, located in Barsana in Mathura district, Uttar Pradesh, India. The temple is dedicated to the goddess Radha. The main deities of the temple are Radha Krishna who are worshiped together in the form of Shri Laadli Lal, which means the beloved daughter and son of the town.

The temple is stretched on the top of Bhanugarh hills, which is about 250 meters in height. It attracts huge crowd of devotees and tourists visiting temple from across the world for its most popular festivals - Radhashtami and Lathmar Holi.

== History ==
Radha Rani Temple is originally believed to be established by King Vajranabh (great-grandson of Krishna) around 5000 years ago. The temple is said to be in ruins; the icons were rediscovered by Narayan Bhatt (a disciple of Chaitanya Mahaprabhu) and a temple was built in 1675 AD by Raja Bir Singh Deo. Later, the present structure of temple was built by Narayan Bhatt with the help of Raja Todarmal, one of the governors in the Akbar's court.

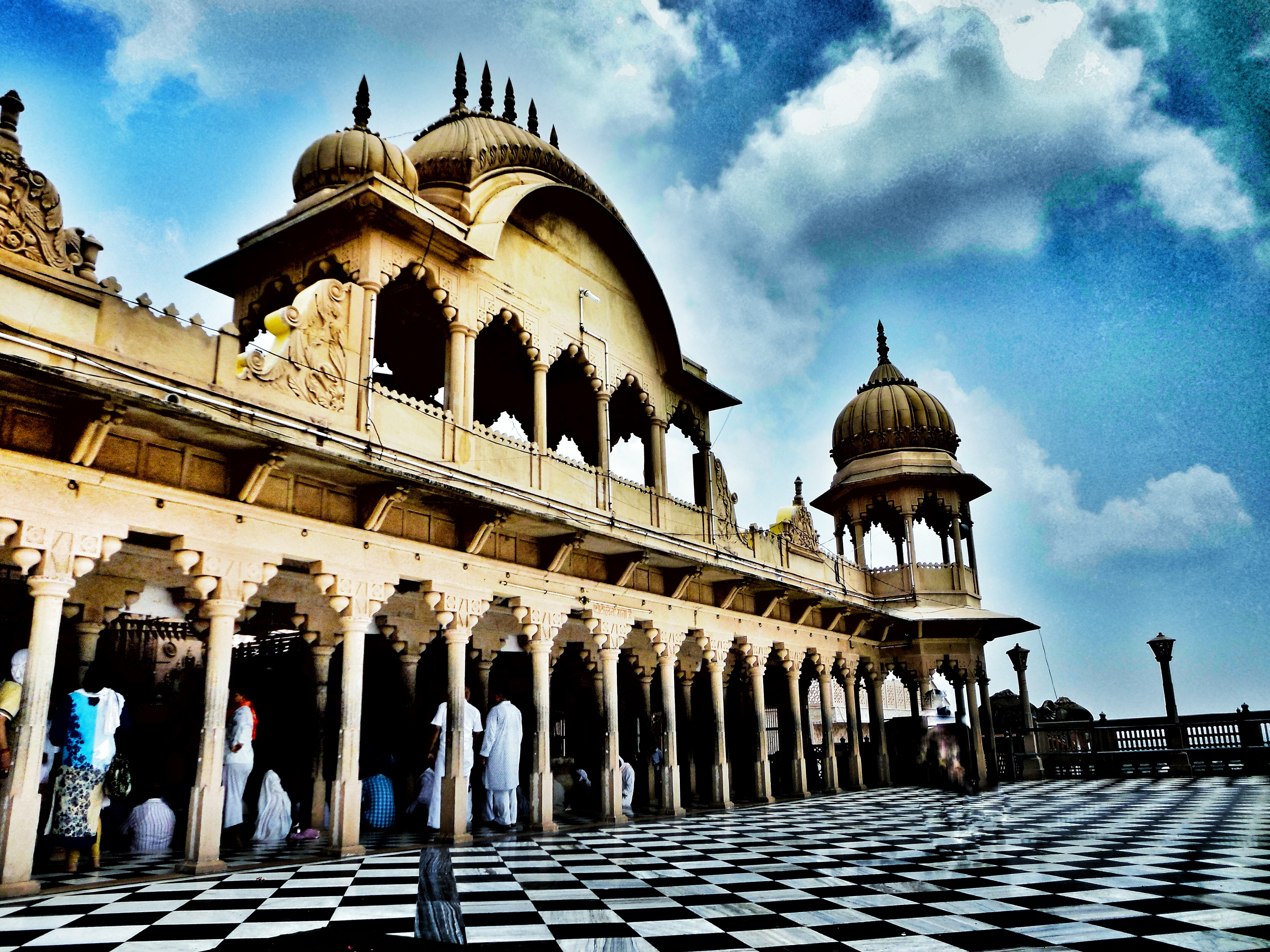
Radha Rani Temple, Barsana

There is also a popular legend associated with the temple. According to it, Krishna's father Nanda and Radha's father Vrishbhanu were close friends. While Nanda was head of Gokula, Vrishbhanu was head of Rawal. However, fed up with the atrocities of Mathura's king Kamsa, both of them with their people shifted to Nandgaon and Barsana. Nanda made Nandishvar hill his home and Vrishbhanu made Bhanugarh hill his permanent abode, which also ultimately became the abode of Radha. Presently, in both the twin towns of Barsana and Nandgaon, there stands the historical temples dedicated to Radha and Krishna on the peak of Nandishvar and Bhanugarh hills respectively. While Nandgaon temple is called the Nand Bhawan, Barsana temple is named after Radha, called Radha Rani temple or Shriji (Shreeji temple).

== Architecture ==
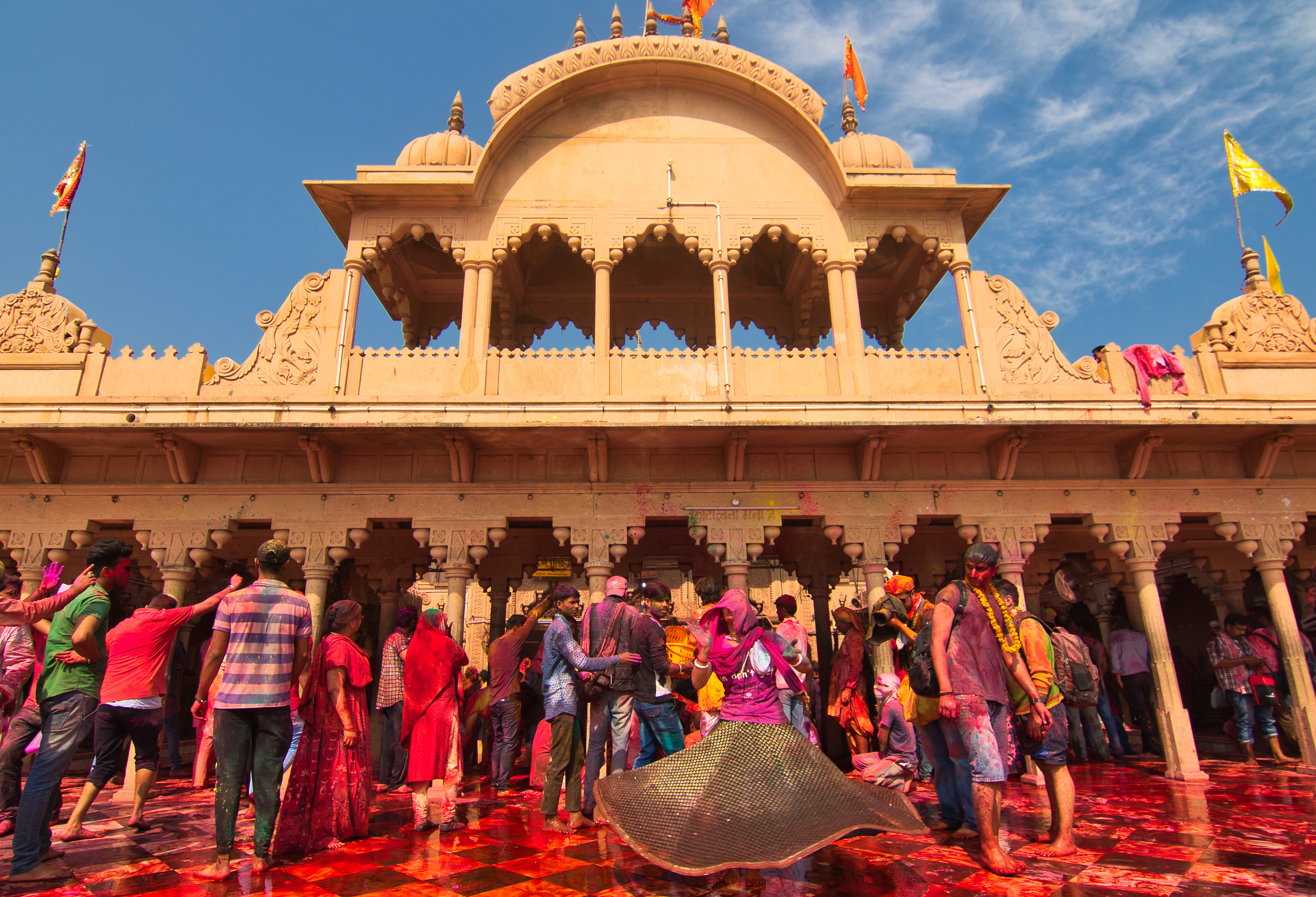
Shreeji Temple

Shreeji Temple, with its arches, pillars and red sandstone, appears to be a structure dating back to the Mughal era. This popular temple in Barsana is a classic example of the Rajput architecture prevailing during that time. The temple is made up of red sandstone and adorned with intricate hand carvings, arches, domes and paintings on its inner walls and ceilings. Red and white stones have been used for the construction of the temple, which are considered to symbolize the love of Radha and Krishna.

There are more than 200 stairs which leads to the main temple from ground. At the foot of the steps that lead to this temple is the palace of Vrishabhanu Maharaj where there are idols of Vrishabhanu Maharaj, Kirtida, Shridama (Sibling of Radha) and Shri Radhika. Near this palace is the temple of Brahma. Also, close by, there is Ashtasakhi temple where Radha along with her principal sakhis (friends) are worshiped. As the temple is on the peak of hill, the whole Barsana can be seen from the temple's premises.

== Festivals ==
Radhashtami and Krishna Janmashtami, birthdays of Radha and Krishna, are the chief festivals of the Radha Rani temple. On both of these days, the temple is decorated with flowers, balloons and lights. The deities are dressed in new dresses and jewellery sets. After performing "Aarti", 56 types of dishes, also called "Chappan Bhog" is offered to Radha Krishna which later gets distributed to the devotees as "Prasada".

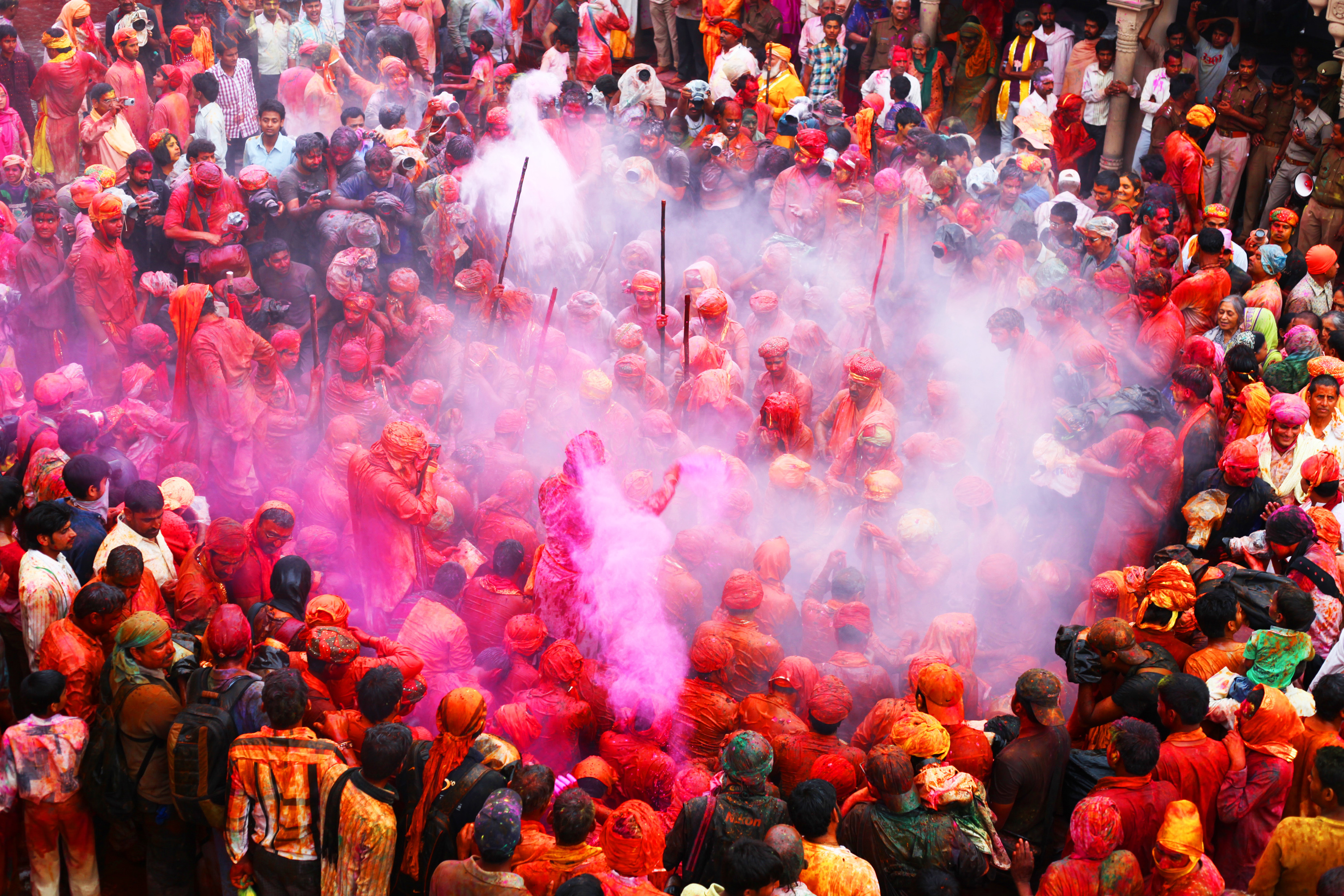
Barsana Holi festival inside Radha Rani Temple premises

Besides Radhastami and Janmashtami, Lathmar Holi is also one of the significant festivals of the temple. To celebrate Lathmar Holi, devotees and tourists visit the temple. The Holi in Barsana starts a week before the actual day of the festival and lasts till Rang Panchami.

== Timings ==
The time zone (UTC+05:30) observed through India by the priest.

Summer Timings - Morning 05:00 am to 02:00 pm and Evening 05:00 pm to 09:00 pm.

Winter Timings - Morning 05:30 am to 02:00 pm and Evening 05:00 pm to 08:30 pm.

== Gallery ==
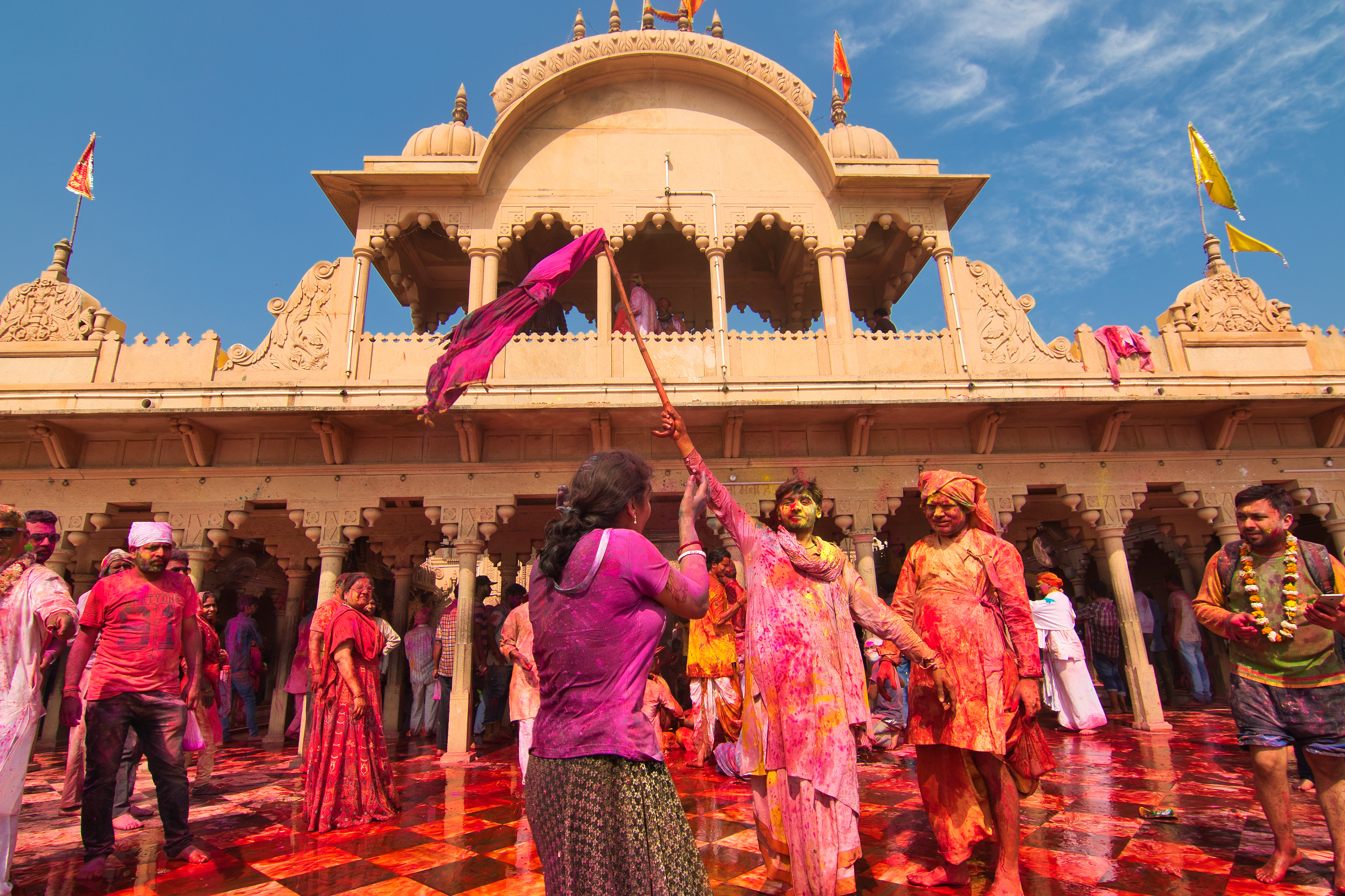
Front view of temple

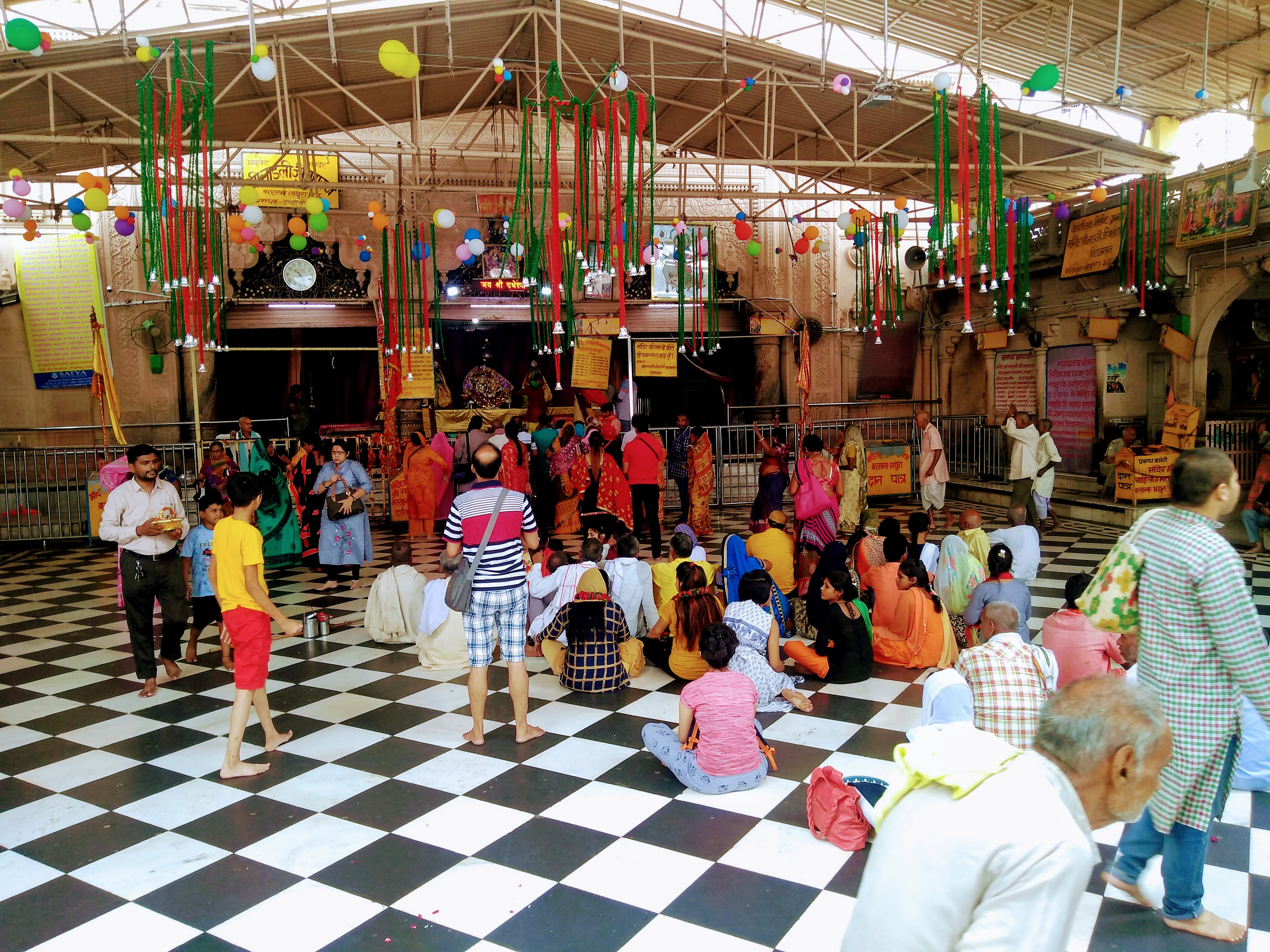
Inside premises of Radha Rani Temple

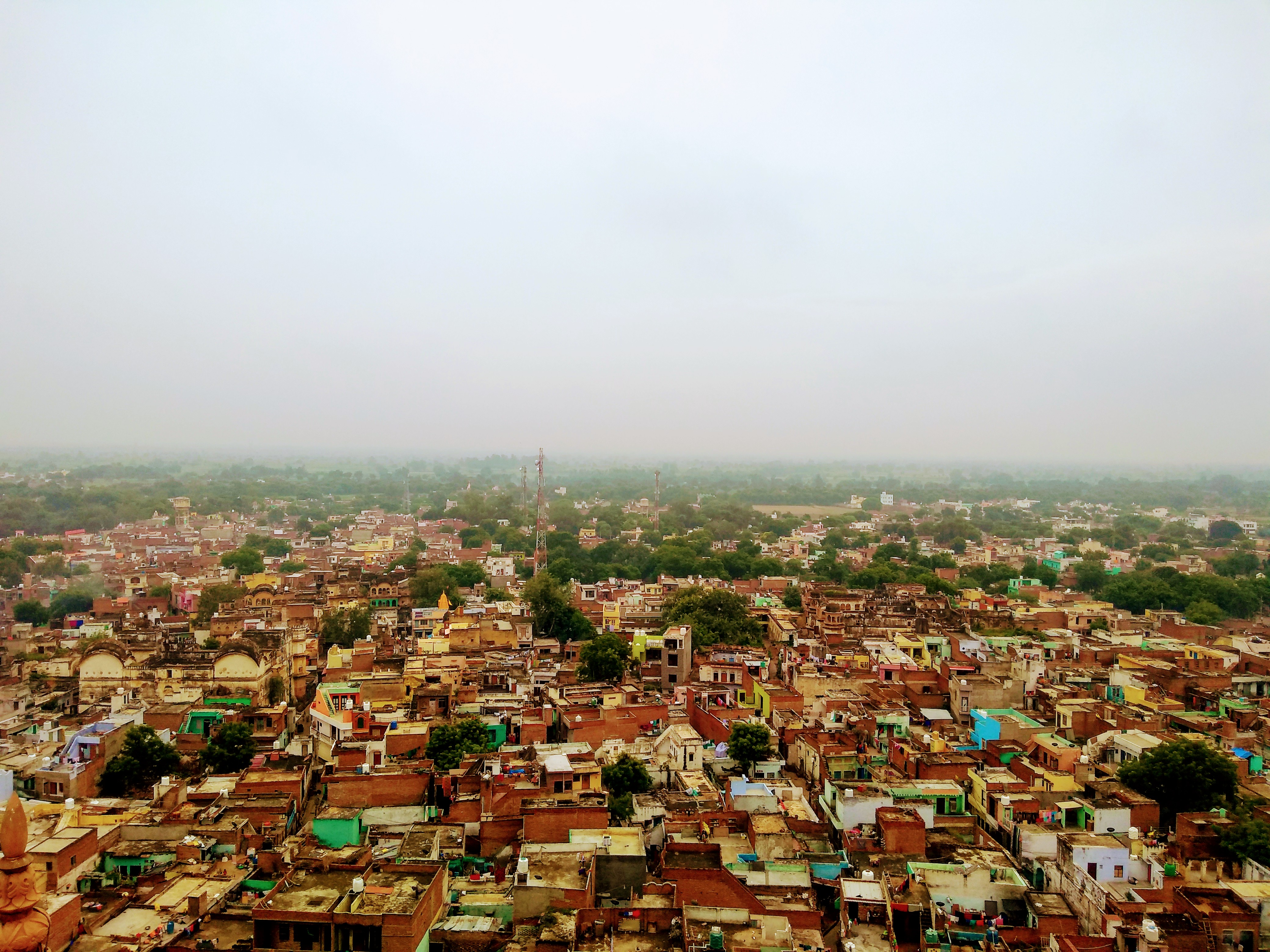
Top View of Barsana from Radha Rani Temple

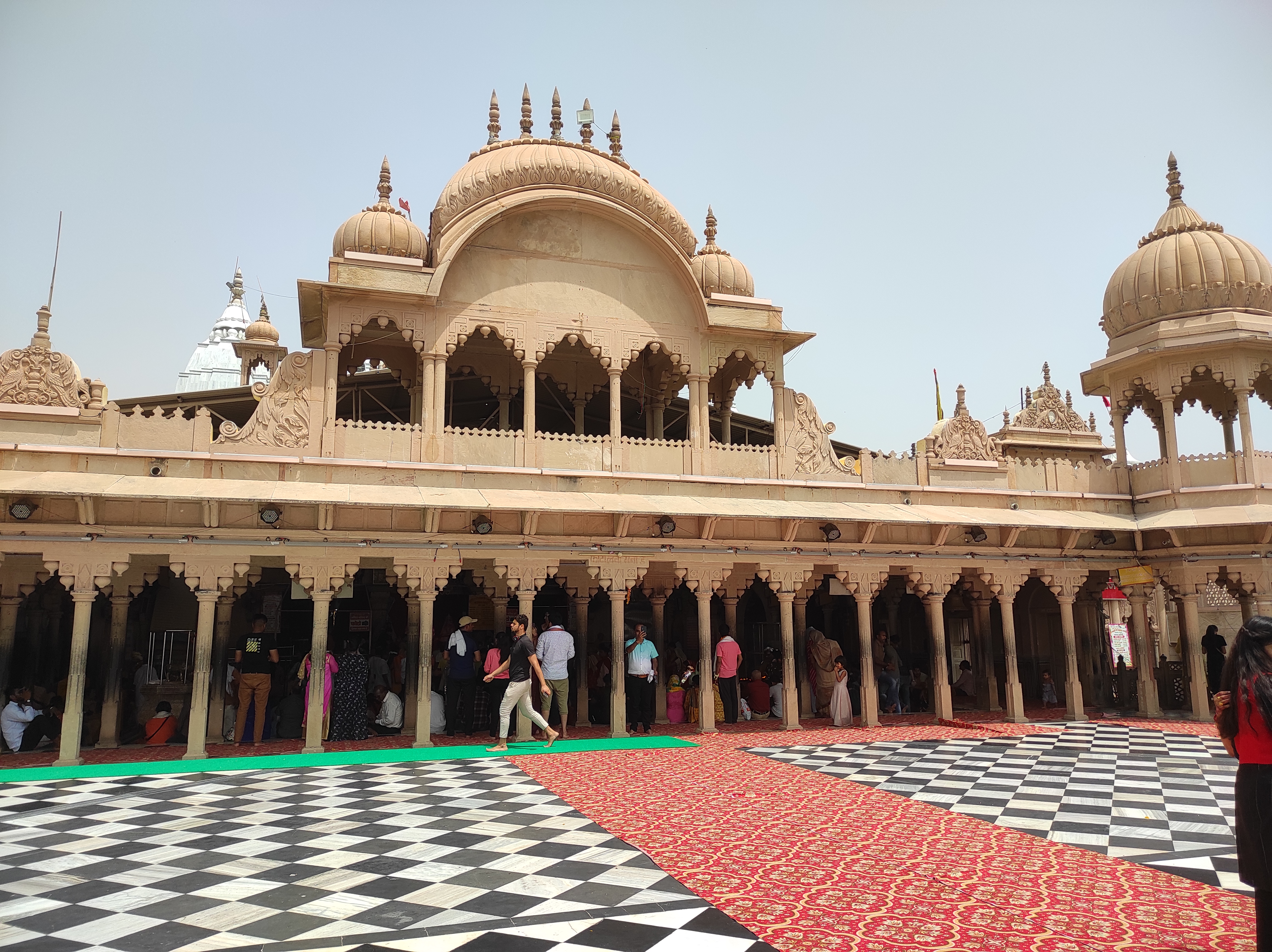
Side view of Temple

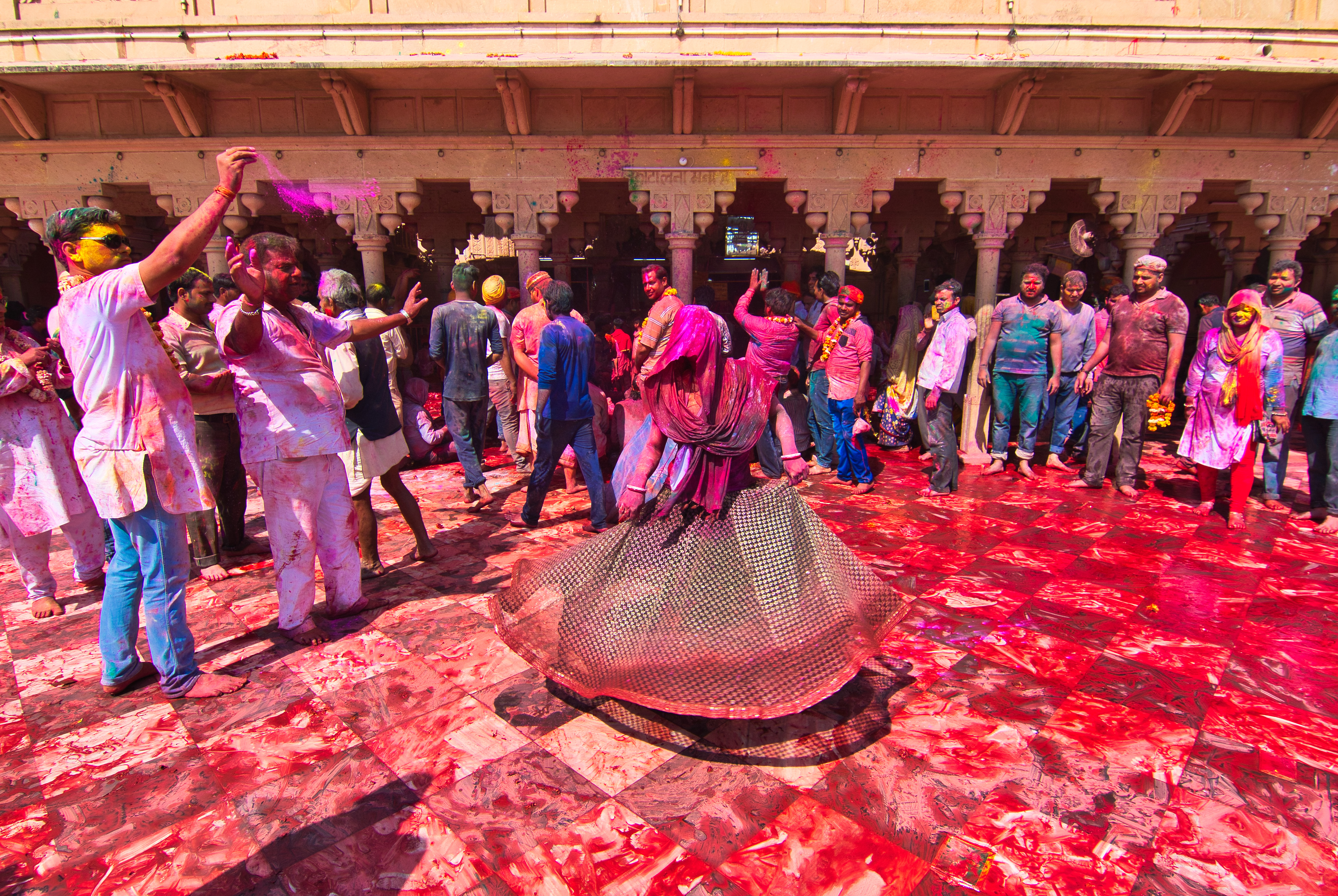
Holi celebration inside the Temple

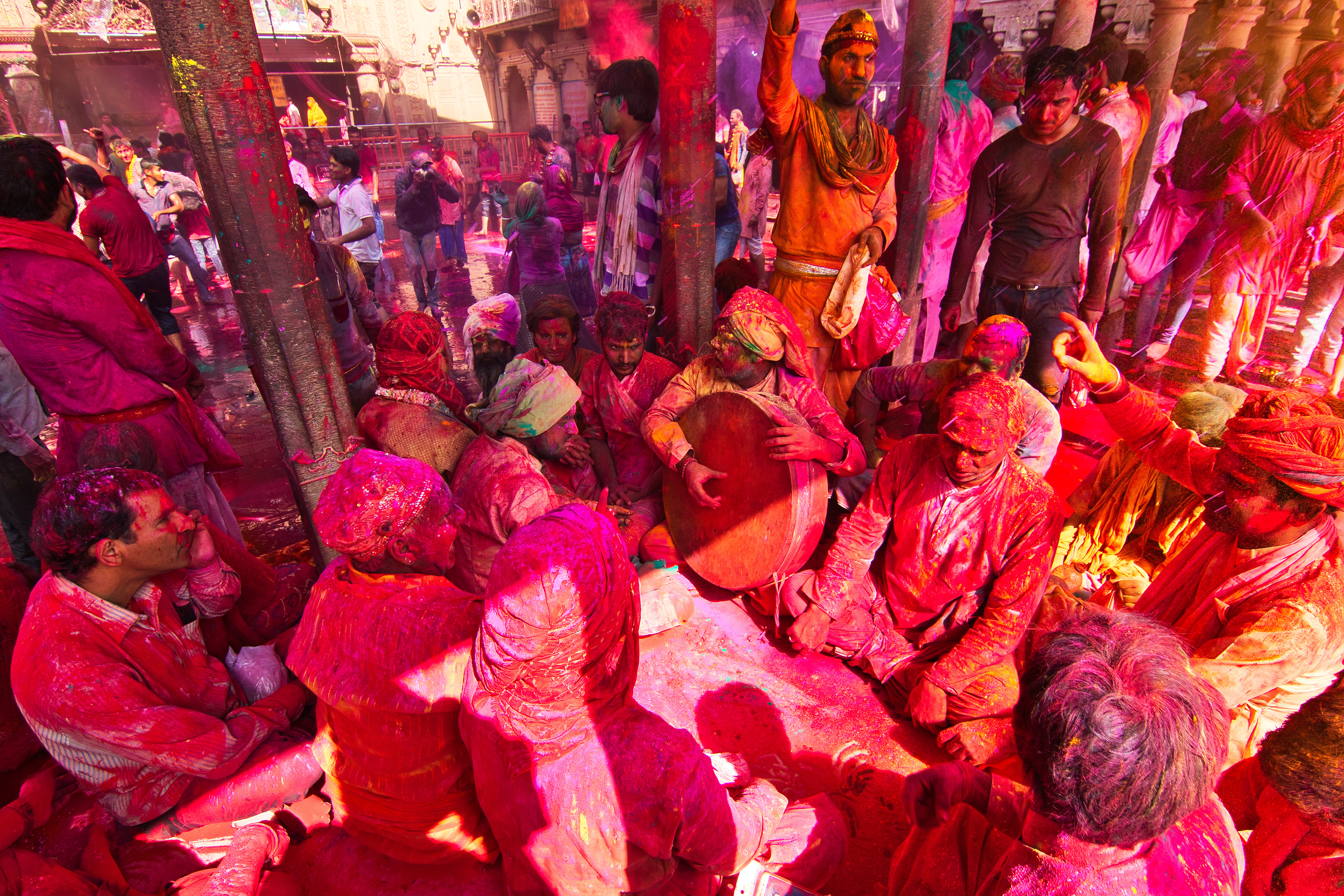
Gathering of devotees on the occasion of Holi in Temple premises

== Nearby attractions ==
- Rangeeli Mahal Barsana, also called Kirti Temple, named after Radha's mother Kirtida and dedicated to Goddess Radha.
- Maan Mandir, temple dedicated to Radha Krishna.
- Mor Kutir, temple dedicated to peacock forms of Radha and Krishna.
- Khadri Van.
- Sankari Khor Barsana.
- Pili Pokhar, also called Priya Kund dedicated to Goddess Radha.
- Radha Bagh.
- Shri Kushal Bihari, Jaipur Temple, Barsana.
- Shri Chitra Sakhi Temple.

== See also ==
- Banke Bihari Temple
- Radha Kund
