= Bhojakata =

Bhojakata was the capital of Rukmi a Bhoja-Yadava king of Vidarbha Kingdom. Rukmi wanted his sister Rukmini to be married by the Chedi king Shishupala, but she was in love with Vasudeva Krishna. Krishna abducted Rukmini against the will of Rukmi. Then king Rukmi left the capital of Vidarbha, viz Kundinapuri and chased Krishna. He pledged that he will not return to his capital without Rukmini. But he was defeated by Krishna's army. Rukmi kept his promise by constructing another capital for Vidarbha, to the west of Kundinapuri called Bhojakata. Since then he started ruling from this new capital. He never returned to Kundinapuri.

Bhojakata can be identified with present-day Bhatkuli village west of Amravati to the western boundary of Vidharbha region of Maharashtra state of India.

== See also ==
- Bhojas of Goa
