= Nandgaon, Uttar Pradesh =

Nandgaon
- Town
- Location in Uttar Pradesh, India Nandgaon (India)
- Coordinates: 27.72°N 77.38°E
- Country: India
- State: Uttar Pradesh
- District: Mathura
- Named for: Nandi

Government
  - Type: Nagar Panchayat(Shri Mati Manju Devi is chairman from May-2023)
- Elevation: 184 m (604 ft)

Population (2001)
  - Total: 9,956

Languages
  - Official: Hindi
  - Native: Braj Bhasha dialect
- Time zone: UTC+5:30 (IST)
- Vehicle registration: UP 85
- Website: up.gov.in

Nandgaon is a historical town and a nagar panchayat in Mathura district in the Indian state of Uttar Pradesh. Nandgaon is a religious centre in Braj region.

The town is named after Nandi, the bull of Shiva, and was formerly called Nandigrāma. The hill in the town was formerly known as Nandīśvar or Rudraparvata, and was considered to be Śiva-svarūpa (Shiva's own form). Before the sixteenth century, the town was not associated with Krishna. Since then, due to its proximity to Barsana (birthplace of Radha) and a false etymology linking the town to Nanda, Krishna's father, the town has become associated with Krishna.

The Nandarāyajī kā Mandira at the peak of the hill houses identical images of Krishna and Balarama flanked by Nanda and Yashoda. The current temple was built in the mid-eighteenth century by Rūp Siṁh, a Sinsinwar Jat. Surrounding the town are several tanks and ponds associated with events from Krishna's life.

== Geography ==
Nandgaon is located at 27.72°N 77.38°E, and has an average elevation of 184 metres (603 feet). Within Nandgaon lies the ancient water body Paawan Sarovar. The ancient site has been restored by the Braj Foundation.

== Demographics ==
As of the 2001 Census of India, Nandgaon had a population of 9956. Males constitute 54% of the population and females 46%. Nandgaon has an average literacy rate of 45%, lower than the national average of 59.5%: male literacy is 59%, and female literacy is 29%. In Nandgaon, 19% of the population is under 6 years of age.

== See also ==
- Krishna Janmasthan Temple Complex
- Ram Janmabhoomi, Rama's birthplace
- Janakpur Dham, Sita's birthplace in Nepal
- Punaura Dham, Sita's birthplace in India
- Kundinapuri, Rukmini's birthplace
- Kaundinyapur, near Nagpur and associated with Rukmini's birthplace Kundinapuri
- Raval, Mathura, Radha's birthplace
- Parikrama
- Yatra
