= Vidarbha kingdom =

Ancient Indian kingdom

Kingdom of Vidarbha
- unknown (?~1100 BCE)–unknown (?~500 BCE)
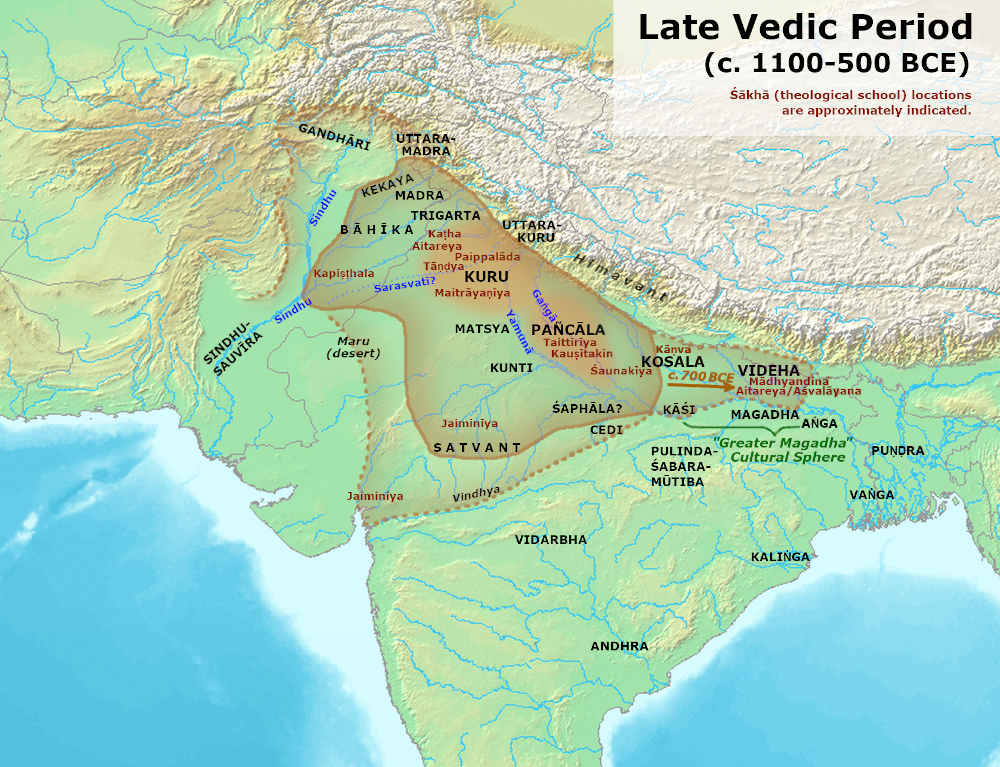
- Vidarbha and other kingdoms of the late Vedic period
- Capital: Kaundinyapur; Bhojakata
- Religion: Historical Vedic religion
- Government: Monarchy
- Maharaja (Great King)
- Historical era: Iron Age
  - Established: unknown (?~1100 BCE)
  - Disestablished: unknown (?~500 BCE)
Succeeded by
Vajjika League

The Vidarbha kingdom in the Sanskrit epic Mahabharata is among the many kingdoms ruled by Yadu kings (Bhoja Yadavas). It was situated in the region still known as Vidarbha in what is now Maharashtra in central India.

Indumati, the grandmother of Rama and mother of King Dasharatha was also a princess of Vidarbha kingdom. Kundinapuri was its capital, which is identified as Kaundinyapur in the eastern Maharashtra. Rukmini's brother Rukmi founded another kingdom with capital Bhojakata, close to Vidarbha proper. During the Kurukshetra War, when all other kingdoms participated in the battle, Vidarbha under Rukmi stayed neutral, because his army was rejected by both Pandavas and Kauravas who were the two parties engaged in the war. It is not clear if any other king from Vidarbha participated in the war. There is a mention at MBh 6:51, that a Vidarbha army sided with Kauravas under the generalissimo Bhishma.

== Bhojas of Goa ==
Bhojas of Goa who ruled Goa and parts of Konkan and some part of Karnataka from at least 3rd century AD to the 6th century AD are believed to have descended from the Bhojas of Vidarbha who migrated southwards and founded a kingdom in South Konkan(Goa). Goa came under the political sway of the Bhojas who ruled this territory in feudal allegiance to the emperor of Pataliputra or perhaps under Satavahanas. The Bhoja seat of power was located at Chandrapura or Chandraura (Modern Chandor) in Goa.

== See also ==
- Bhojas of Goa
- History of Maharashtra
