= Devaraja (Bhoja dynasty) =

Founder of Bhoja dynasty

- Successor: Asankita
- Dynasty: Bhoja dynasty

Devaraja (also known as Devaraj) was the founder of the Bhoja dynasty, which ruled over the region of Goa and other parts of western India from the 3rd to the 6th century CE.

== History ==
The King Devaraja was the first known ruler who established the Bhoja dynasty in Chandrapur, dating back to the 3rd or 4th century AD ¹.During his reign, he expanded his kingdom through conquests and strategic alliances. The Siroda plate and three copper plates provide valuable information about his reign. These ancient texts feature inscriptions in Sanskrit, with some expressions in Prakrit, indicating Sanskrit's dominance during that period. Circular seal with a relief figure of a swan (though each ruler may have had their own symbol) and Ratification of gifts made by Prabhu Naga Bhogikamatya for spiritual salvation. Interestingly, other rulers, like Ashankit, had different symbols - his was an elephant, as seen on three copper plates. Devaraja is credited with establishing a well-organized administrative system, which facilitated trade, commerce, and cultural exchange. He also patronized Hinduism and encouraged the construction of temples and other public works.

The earliest recorded Bhoja ruler in Goa, King Devaraj, is mentioned in a 3rd- or 4th-century AD inscription found in South Goa. This southern Brahmi script plate, issued from Chandrapur, grants tolls and land to Brahmins Govindswami and Indraswami. The Bhoja rulers of Chandrapur controlled areas beyond Goa's west coast, with records of grants found in Ponda taluka and surrounding Konkan regions.

The Chalukya period began with Pulakesi II (AD 610). Following Dantidurga's establishment of the Rashtrakuta dynasty (AD 753), the Chalukyas became feudatories, remaining so until AD 980. Later, the Silaharas and Kadambas also became Rashtrakuta feudatories.

=== Successors and Decline ===
Devaraja was succeeded by Asankita who continued to rule over the Bhoja kingdom for several centuries. However, the dynasty declined in the 6th century CE, eventually giving way to other ruling powers.
