= Drn (Prague) =

Coordinates: 50°05′N 14°25′E

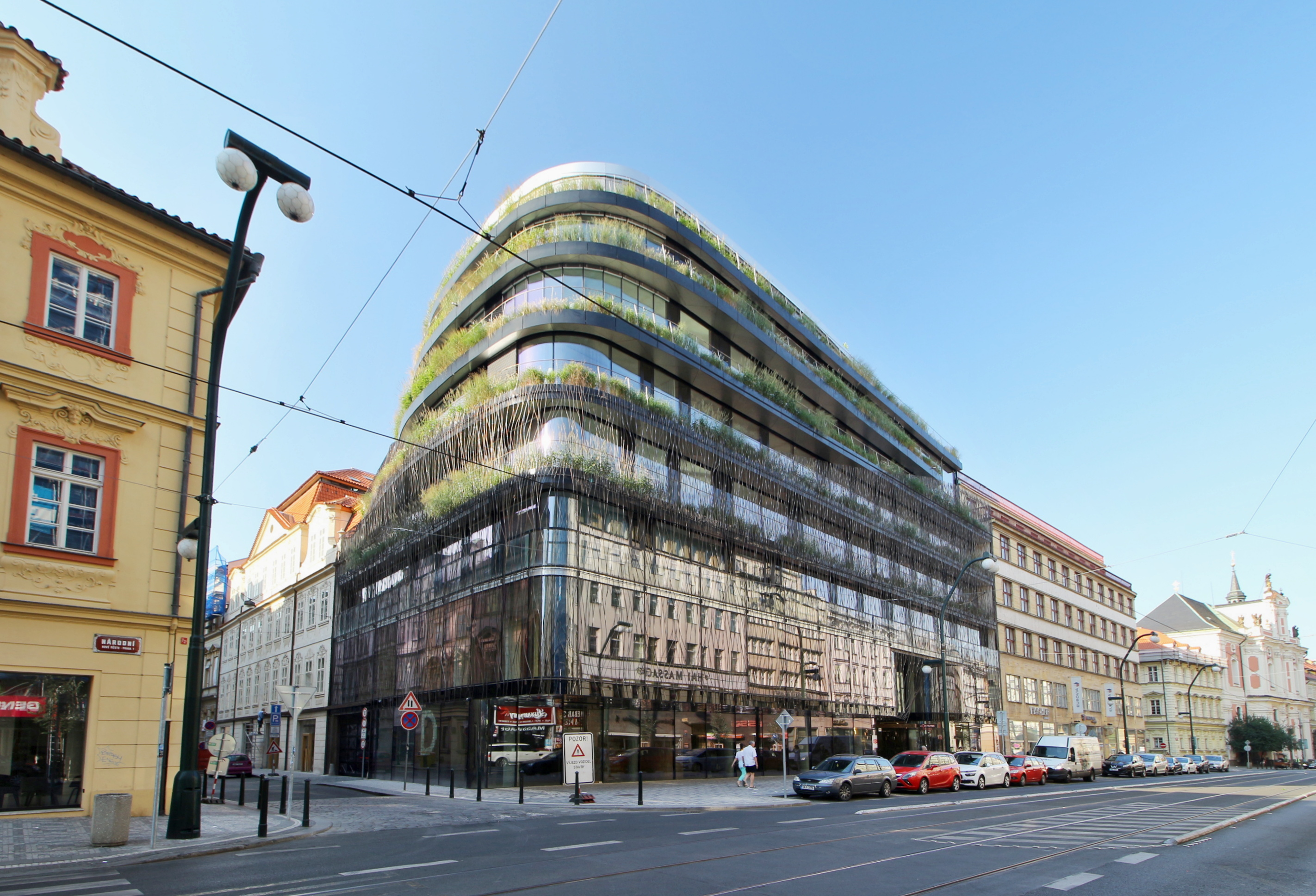
- Drn in 2018 from the Národní street
- Interactive map of the Drn area

General information
- Location: Prague, Czech Republic
- Construction started: 2012
- Completed: 2017
- Owner: KGAL (2020)

Design and construction
- Architect: Stanislav Fiala

Drn (translated as a turf from Czech) is a polyfunctional building located on the corner of streets Národní and Mikulandská in the New Town of Prague, Czech Republic. It contains the most expensive offices in the city and also some shops and restaurants. The building was designed by Stanislav Fiala is an example of 21st century modern and sustainable Czech architecture. It was built between 2012 and 2017 on the site of a car park. It has four underground and eight floors above ground, topped with a green roof. The organic shaped façade is made from glass and steel. The name of the building comes from the greenery, which is growing on galleries of the building. The baroque Schönkirchovský palác is connected to the building from the back.
