= Disaster Resource Network =

The Disaster Resource Network (DRN), an initiative of the World Economic Forum, was the first non-governmental organization to donate to the United Nations' CERF. The UN CERF is a fund created to aid regions threatened by starvation and disasters, particularly African nations. DRN organizes and mobilizes business sector resources to provide assistance in response to disasters around the world.
