= Bhoja dynasty =

Dynasty based in south-west India (3rd to 6th-century)

Bhoja dynasty also known as Bhojas of Goa, were a dynasty that ruled Goa, parts of Konkan, and some parts of Karnataka from at least the 3rd century AD to the 6th century. They were feudatories to the Mauryas of Konkana, and possibly to the Chalukyas of Vatapi who expelled the Mauryas. The Bhoja seat of power was located at Chandrapura or Chandraura (modern Chandor) in Goa.

== History ==
The earliest reference to Bhojas is found in rock edits of Ashoka as well as Bhavishya Purana. They are connected to the Yadavas of Vidarbha and Dwaraka, and are believed to have descended from them. Though their history is very obscure, copper-plates and other literary historical sources shed light on their history. While ruling Chandramandala area from Chandraura, their territory might have extended Goa, parts of North Canara and Belgaum districts of Karnataka. Some sources say that they might have been feudatories of the Satavahana. They were known for overseas trade, and the organisations of traders were highly ordered. Egyptian geographer Ptolemy, and the unknown author of Periplus of the Erythraean Sea has named this tract of the Bhojas as Arieke (Sodon). Their territory is also mentioned as a pirate coast of Satavahanas as well.

== Genealogy ==
A number of Copper-plates found in Goa assigned to 4th to 7th century A.D. reveal names of Bhoja Kings. The relationship between these rulers and the names of earlier rulers are not known. The names are as follows:

- Devaraja
- Asankita
- Asankitavarman
- Kapalivarman
- Prithvimallavarman
- Chetasadevi (Prithvimallavarman's mother)
- Shatrudamana (Prithvimallavarman's brother)

== See also ==
- Vidarbha Kingdom
