= Kundinapuri =

Kundinapuri was the capital of Vidarbha kingdom, ruled by king Bhima. It was also ruled by king Bhishmaka and his son Rukmi, a Bhoja-Yadava. However, king Rukmi created another capital for Vidarbha called Bhojakata. Two famous ladies mentioned in the Mahabharata epic, Damayanti and Rukmini, lived here. They were both well known Vidarbha princesses. Damayanti was the daughter of king Bhima and the wife of the Nishadha prince Nala. Rukmini was the daughter of Bhishmaka and the sister of Rukmi. She was the first wife of Vasudeva Krishna of Dwaraka.

Kundinapuri was the gateway for the ancient travellers from north India to southern India. It was well connected to northern cities of ancient India like Ayodhya. This ancient route is mentioned in Mahabharata. It was also connected to kingdoms like Avanti and Nishadha.

Kundinapuri is identified to be the modern day town of Kaundinyapur (also spelt Kaundanyapur) in Amravati district in Maharashtra state of India.

== See also ==
- Ram Janmabhoomi, Rama's birthplace
- Janakpur Dham, Sita's birthplace in Nepal
- Punaura Dham, Sita's birthplace in India
- Krishna Janmasthan Temple Complex, Krishna's birthplace
- Kaundinyapur, near Nagpur and associated with Rukmini's birthplace Kundinapuri
- Rawal, Uttar Pradesh, Radha's birthplace
- Parikrama
- Mithila Madhya Parikrama
- Sitamarhi Dham Parikrama
- Yatra
