= Vrishabhanu =

Father of Hindu goddess Radha

- Texts: Padma Purana, Brahma Vaivarta Purana, Garga Samhita
- Gender: Male
- Region: Vraja

Genealogy
- Parents: Surabhānu (father)
- Spouse: Kirtida
- Children: Radha
- Dynasty: Yaduvamsha-Chandravamsha

Vrishabhanu (Sanskrit: वृषभानु; IAST: Vṛṣbhānu), also spelled as Brushabhanu Gop , is a chieftain featured in Hindu scriptures. He is described as the father of the goddess Radha, who is the chief consort of god Krishna and also regarded as the incarnation of the goddess Lakshmi in Dvapara Yuga.

According to the Padma Purana, Vrishbhanu was the Yadav chief of Barsana, and the owner of 10 lakh cows. In his previous birth as King Suchandra, Vrishabhanu is stated to have received a divine boon from Brahma to become the father of goddess Lakshmi in the Dvapara Yuga.

According to the Sri Radhika vivaha varnana of Garga Samhita “She, the daughter of King Vrishabhānu is Goddess Lakshmi.” - Text 23, Chapter 16.

== Legend ==
=== Boon ===
In his previous birth, Vrishbhanu was named as Suchandra and was married to Kalavati, the grand-daughter of Daksha Prajapati. After enjoying conjugal relations with Kalavati for a long time, Suchandra retired from his family life and went to the ashrama of sage Agastya. When Kalavati started crying because of being abandoned by her husband, Brahma granted a boon to her that she would reborn with her husband in her next life, and that both of them would be blessed with goddess Lakshmi (Radha) as their daughter.

=== Father of Radha ===
As per the boon of Brahma, King Suchandra was reborn in the Dvapara Yuga as King Vrishbhanu in the land of Vraja. He married Kirtida (The rebirth of Kalavati), and goddess Lakshmi (Radha) was born as their daughter.

According to a different legend, the birth story of Radha is similar to Sita, who was also an avatar of Lakshmi. When King Vrishbhanu went to take a bath in a pond, he saw a baby girl on a lotus flower in the pond, and took her to his home. The baby girl was named as Radha, and was accepted as the daughter of Vrishbhanu and Kirtida.

== See also ==
- Bhishmaka
- Janaka
- Nanda (Hinduism)
