= Kaundinyapur =

Kaundanyapur Kaundinyapur
- village
- Location in Maharashtra, India
- Coordinates: 20.98°N 78.14°E
- Country: India
- State: Maharashtra
- Region: Vidarbha
- District: Amravati

Government
  - Type: Panchayati raj (India)
  - Body: Gram panchayat

Population (2011)
  - Total: 935

Languages
  - Official: Marathi
- Time zone: UTC+5:30 (IST)
- Telephone code: +91-0721
- Vehicle registration: MH27 (Amravati)

Kaundanyapur is a village in Tiosa Tahsil in Amravati District in the state of Maharashtra, India, thought to be the site of Kundinapuri, ancient capital of the legendary Vidarbha Kingdom.

== History ==
Kaundanyapur is the capital of the Vidarbha Kingdom mentioned in the Mahabharata. It is believed that the incident of Rukmini Haran happened here. Shri Krishna rested here for a while and drank water from the Wardha River (the present name of the River Vardayini). There is a famous temple of Vitthal and Rukhmini. The state archaeological department conducted excavations at Kaundanyapur to "ascertain its antiquity". The dig revealed traces of the rampart of the ancient city. "The stone, foundation and brick walls of what appeared to be a palatial building, probably of the 14th or 15th century AD, have also been discovered," the report adds.

An information board at the temple also says that remains from the Copper Age and Stone Age are believed to have been found at Kaundanyapur. The ancient nature of the site also finds mention in the Hyderabad Gazette. Its ancient Vitthal Rukmini temple, situated on a hillock, overlooks the perennially flowing Wardha River. Some believe that in the month of Kartik, Rukmini used to come back to her maternal home in Kaundanyapur. It is also believed that there is a tunnel from the Kaundanyapur temple to another temple of the goddess Amba Devi located close by. However, there is another Ambai temple in the city of Amravati. The telling and retelling of the story has resulted in some confusion regarding the Ambai temple from where Rukmini is believed to have eloped with Lord Krishna.

== See also ==
- Ram Janmabhoomi, Rama's birthplace
- Janakpur Dham, Sita's birthplace in Nepal
- Punaura Dham, Sita's birthplace in India
- Krishna Janmasthan Temple Complex, Krishna's birthplace
- Kundinapuri, Rukmini's birthplace
- Raval, Uttar Pradesh, Radha's birthplace
- Parikrama
- Mithila Madhya Parikrama
- Sitamarhi Dham Parikrama
- Yatra
