= Deoranian =

- town
- Location in Uttar Pradesh, India Deoranian (India)
- Coordinates: 28°37′35″N 79°28′52″E
- Country: India
- State: Uttar Pradesh
- District: Bareilly
- Elevation: 177 m (581 ft)

Population (2001)
  - Total: 17,463

Languages
  - Official: Hindi
- Time zone: UTC+5:30 (IST)
- Vehicle registration: UP
- Website: up.gov.in

Deoranian is a town and a nagar panchayat in Bareilly district in the state of Uttar Pradesh, India.

== Geography ==
Having an average elevation of 177 metres (580 feet), Deoranian is located on the Nainital Road, about 35 kilometres (22 mi) north of Bareilly and 20 kilometres (12 mi) south of the state border.

== Demographics ==
As of 2001 India census, Deoranian had a population of 17,463. Males constitute 52% of the population and females 48%. Deoranian has an average literacy rate of 39%, lower than the national average of 59.5%: male literacy is 50% and, female literacy is 27%. In Deoranian, 19% of the population is under 6 years of age.
