= Barsana =

Town in Mathura, Uttar Pradesh, India

Barsana Barsana Dham
- Town
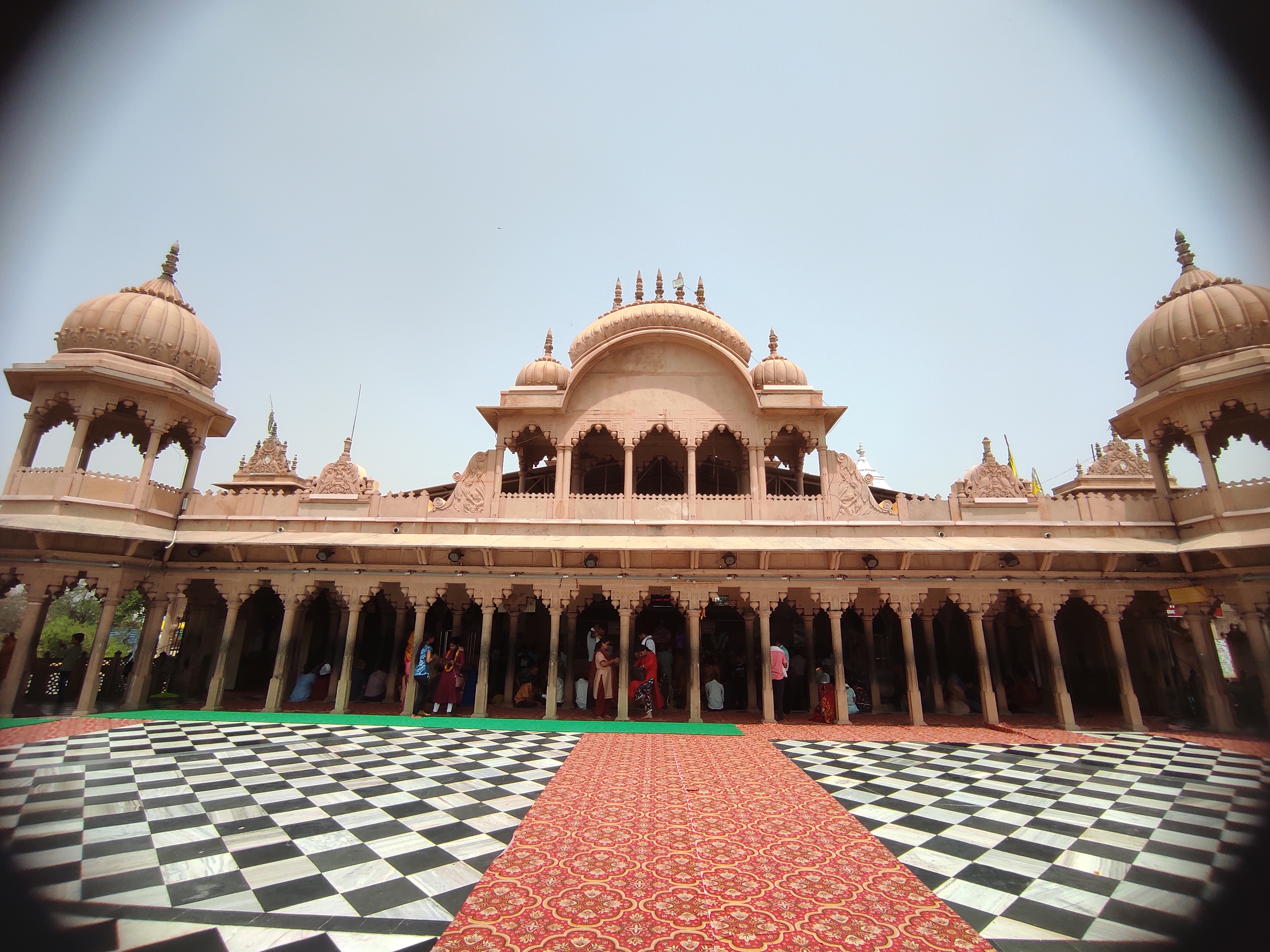
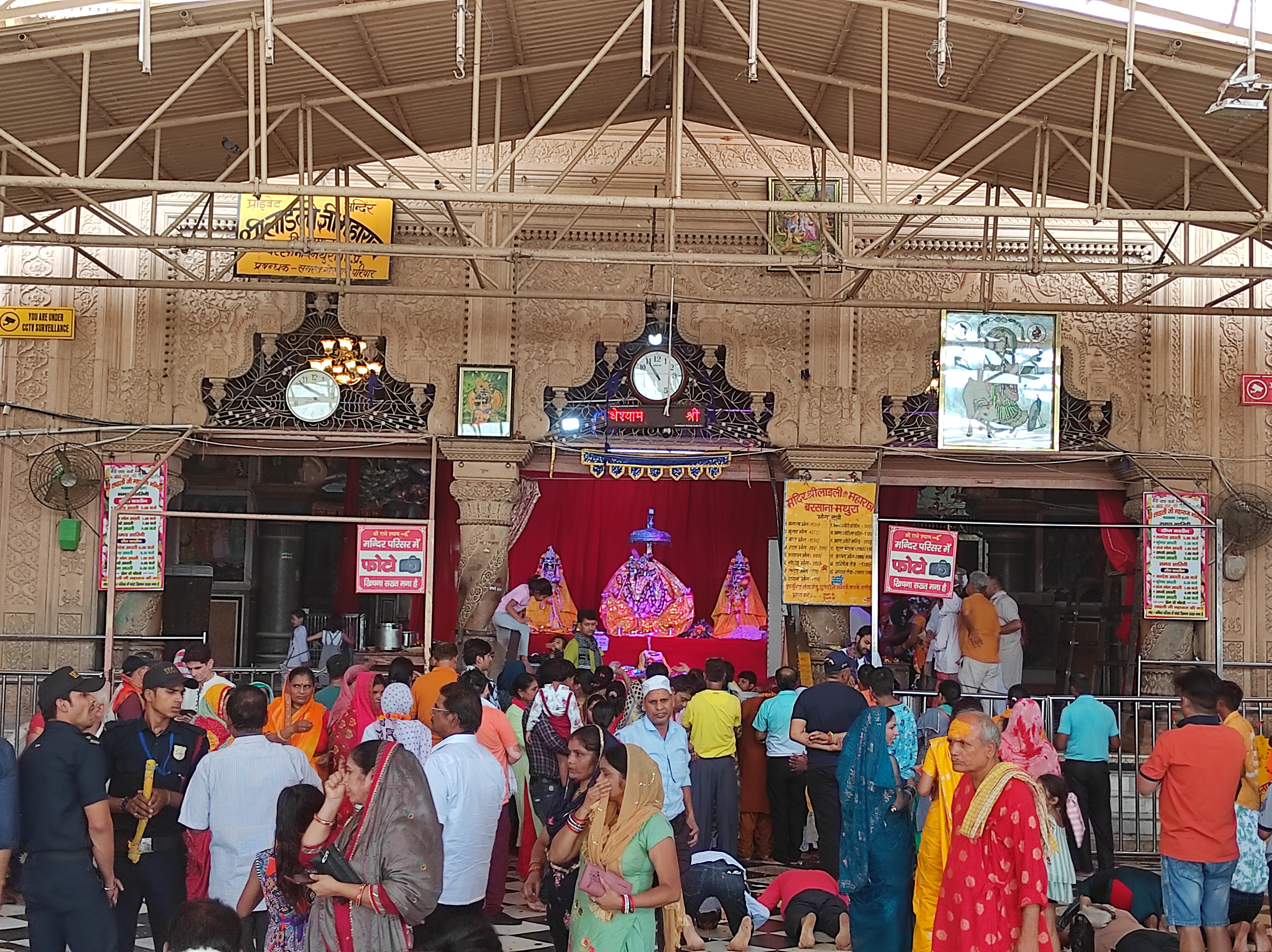
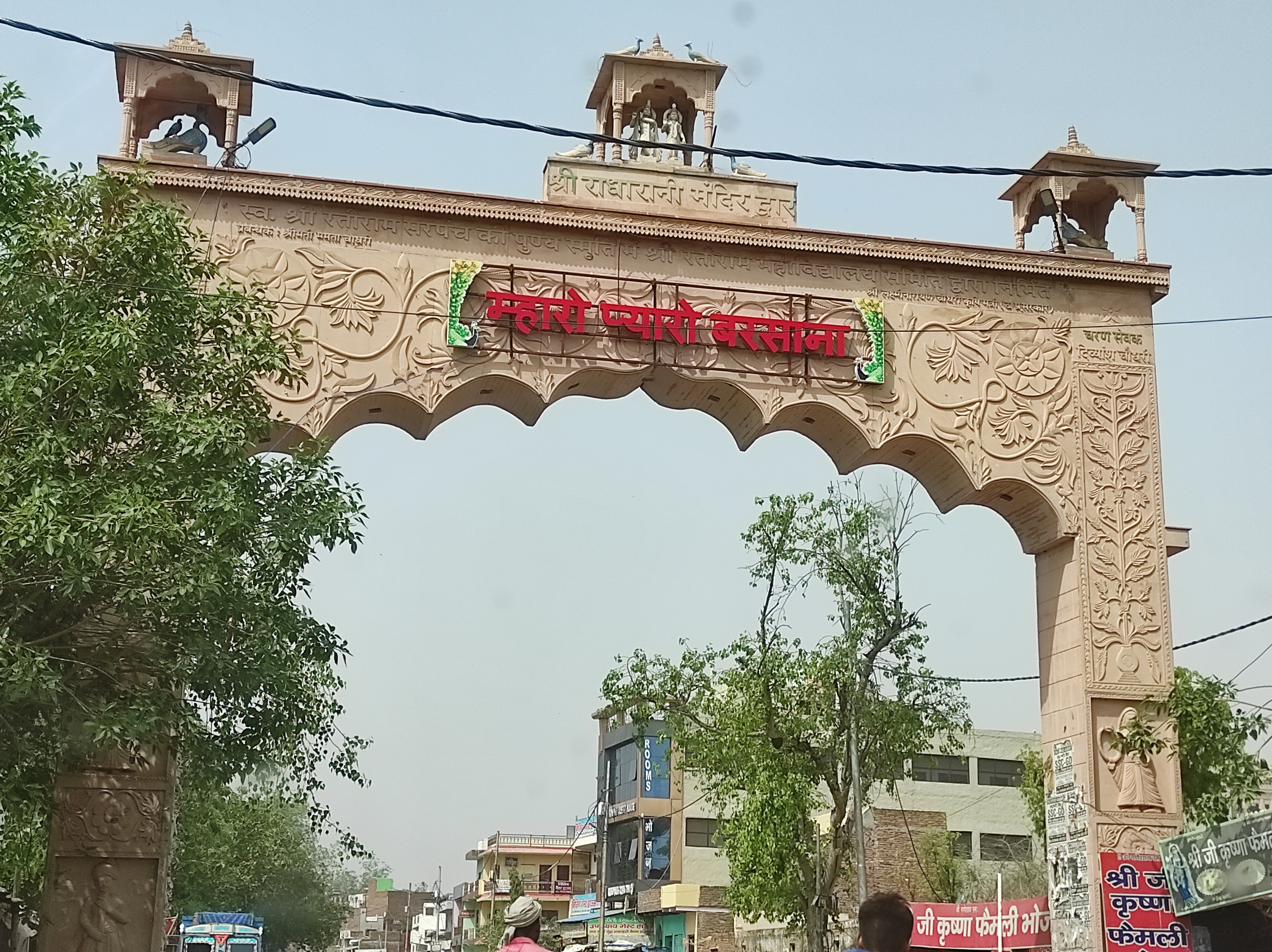
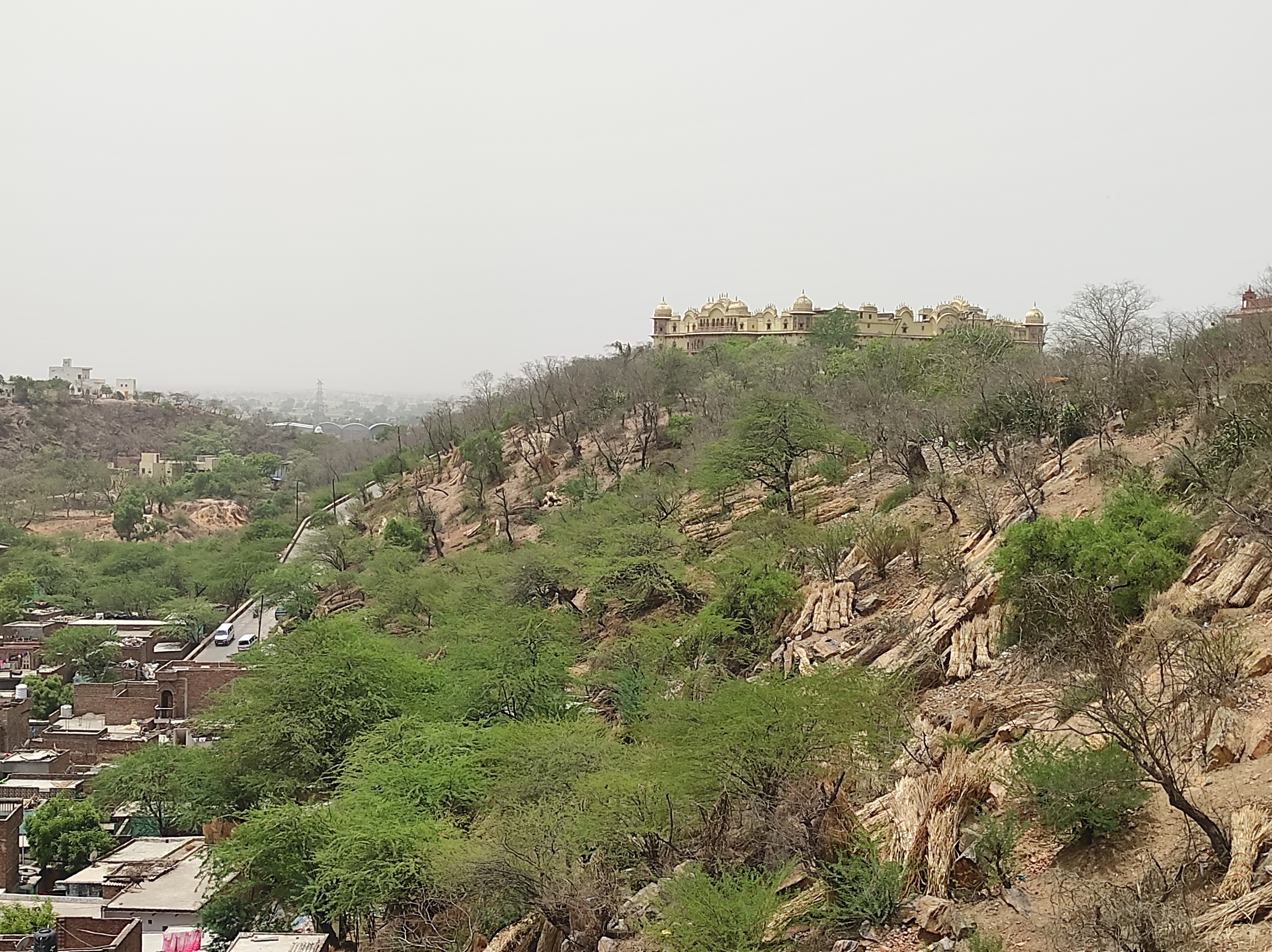
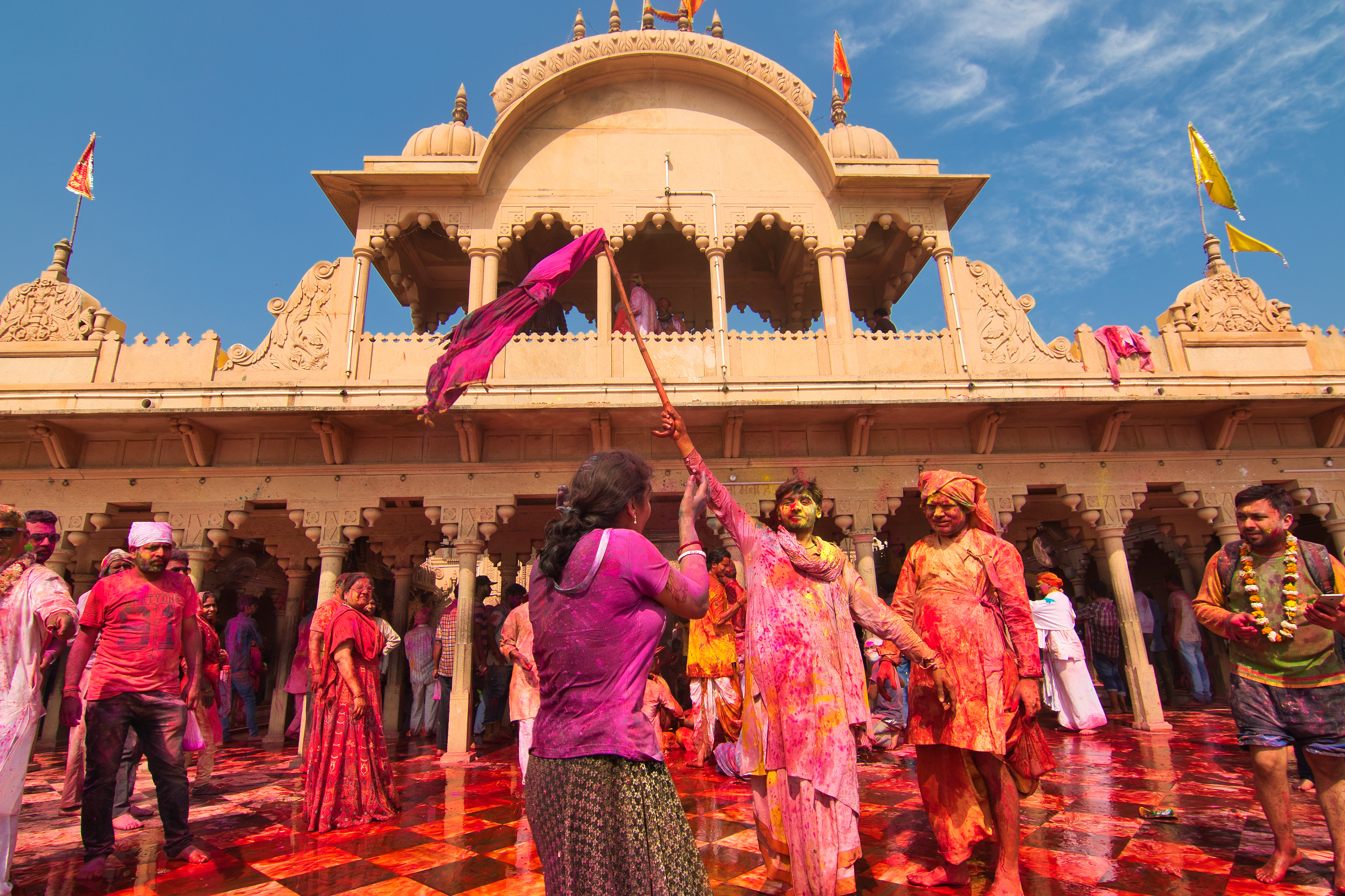
- Clockwise from top: : Outer view of Radha Rani Temple, Inside view of Radharani Temple, Entrance gate of Barsana, Brahmamchal Hill and Holi celebration at Shreeji Temple
- Nickname: The Birthplace of Goddess Radha
- Location in Uttar Pradesh, India
- Coordinates: 27°38′56″N 77°22′44″E
- Country: India
- State: Uttar Pradesh
- District: Mathura
- Elevation: 182 m (597 ft)

Population (2001)
  - Total: 9,215

Languages
  - Official: Hindi
  - Native: Braj Bhasha dialect
- Time zone: UTC+5:30 (IST)
- Vehicle registration: UP-85

Barsana is a historical town and nagar panchayat in the Mathura district of the state of Uttar Pradesh, India. The town holds cultural and religious significance as the birthplace of Hindu goddess Radha, the chief consort of Krishna. Barsana is situated in the Braj region. The main attraction of the town is the historical Radha Rani Temple which attracts huge number of devotees throughout the year.

Barsana is an integral part of the Krishna pilgrimage circuit which also includes Mathura, Vrindavan, Govardhan, Kurukshetra and Dwarka.

== Demographics ==
As of 2001 India census, Barsana had a population of 9215. Males constitute 53% of the population and females 47%. Barsana has an average literacy rate of 53%, lower than the national average of 59.5%; with 66% of the males and 34% of females literate. 19% of the population is under 6 years of age.
