= Ranchhodraiji Temple =

Hindu temple in Dakor, Gujarat, India

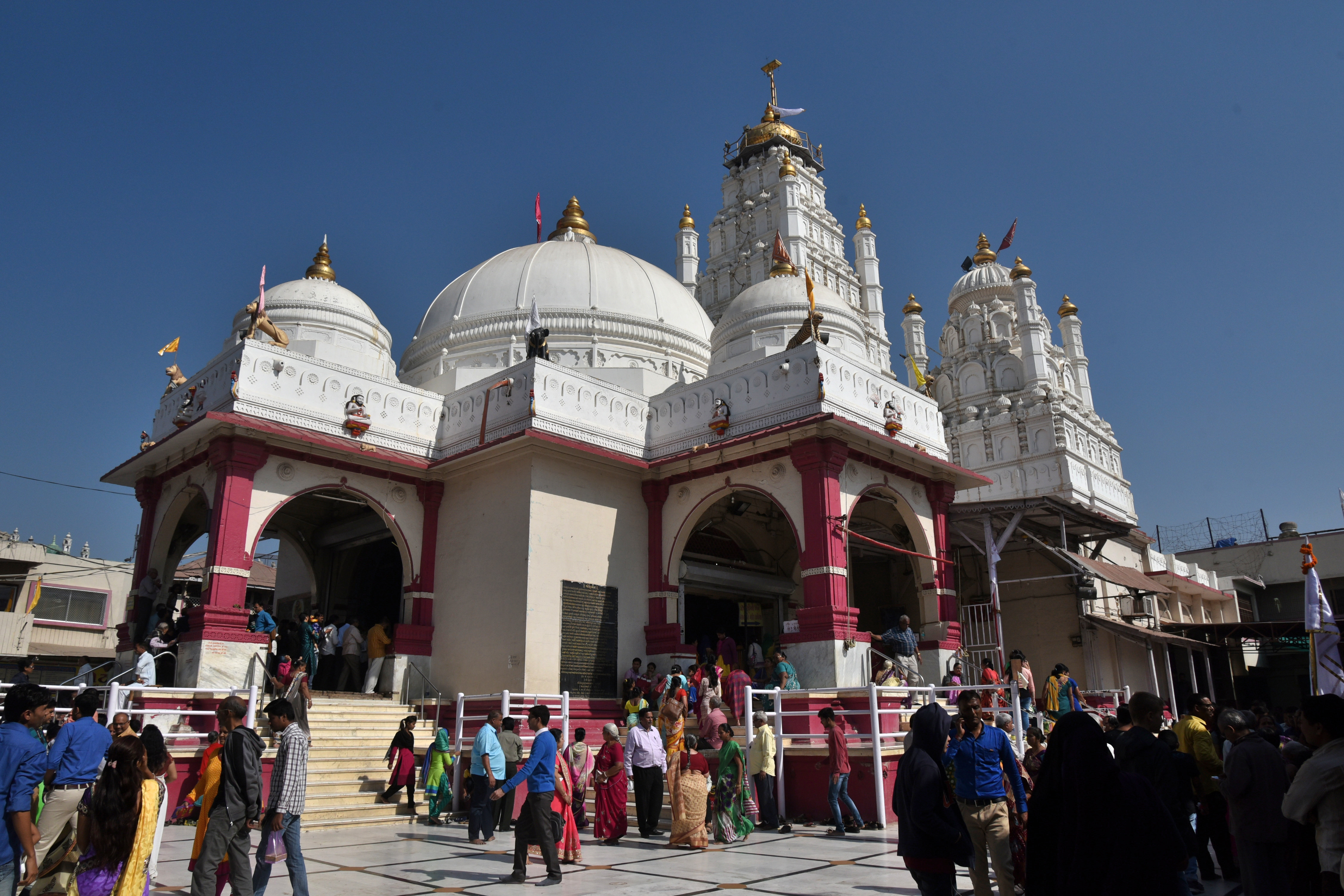
Raṇchoḍrāyjī Temple

The Ranchhodraiji Temple is a Vaishnava Hindu temple located in Dakor, Gujarat, India. According to tradition, the temple contains the original murti from the Dwarkadhish Temple in Dwarka, Gujarat. The temple is of regional significance within Gujarat and takes influence from, but is not formally affilliated with, the Pushtimarga Sampradaya.

== History and Temple ==
The temple of Raṇchoḍrāyjī houses a mūrtī of the Trivikrama form of Viṣṇu idols. Trivikrama idols are standing and have four hands ("caturbhuja"). Each hand holds an item: the cakra (discus), śaṅkha (conch), padma (lotus), and gadā (mace) in that order beginning at the upper left hand and ending in the upper right hand. The name "Raṇchoḍ" refers to the incident when Kr̥ṣṇa fled the battlefield by running away from Jarāsandha to Dvārakā. In Gujarat and Rajasthan, all Trivikrama idols of Viṣṇu are known as "Raṇchoḍ". The Raṇchoḍrāyjī idol at Ḍākor in particular has had a small golden flute placed in the lower right hand in order to convey that Raṇchoḍ (a Trivikrama idol of Viṣṇu) and Kr̥ṣṇa-Gopāl are identical. Mallison notes a broader trend in Gujarat where Viṣṇu-Trivikrama-Raṇchoḍ idols are considered identical with Kr̥ṣṇa by locals (as seen at the Dvārakādhīśa temple in Dvārakā, Śāmalājī, and Tulsīśyām), which she considers a representation of the increased popularity of the Kr̥ṣṇa-Gopāl cult in Gujarat over Viṣṇu-Trivikrama.

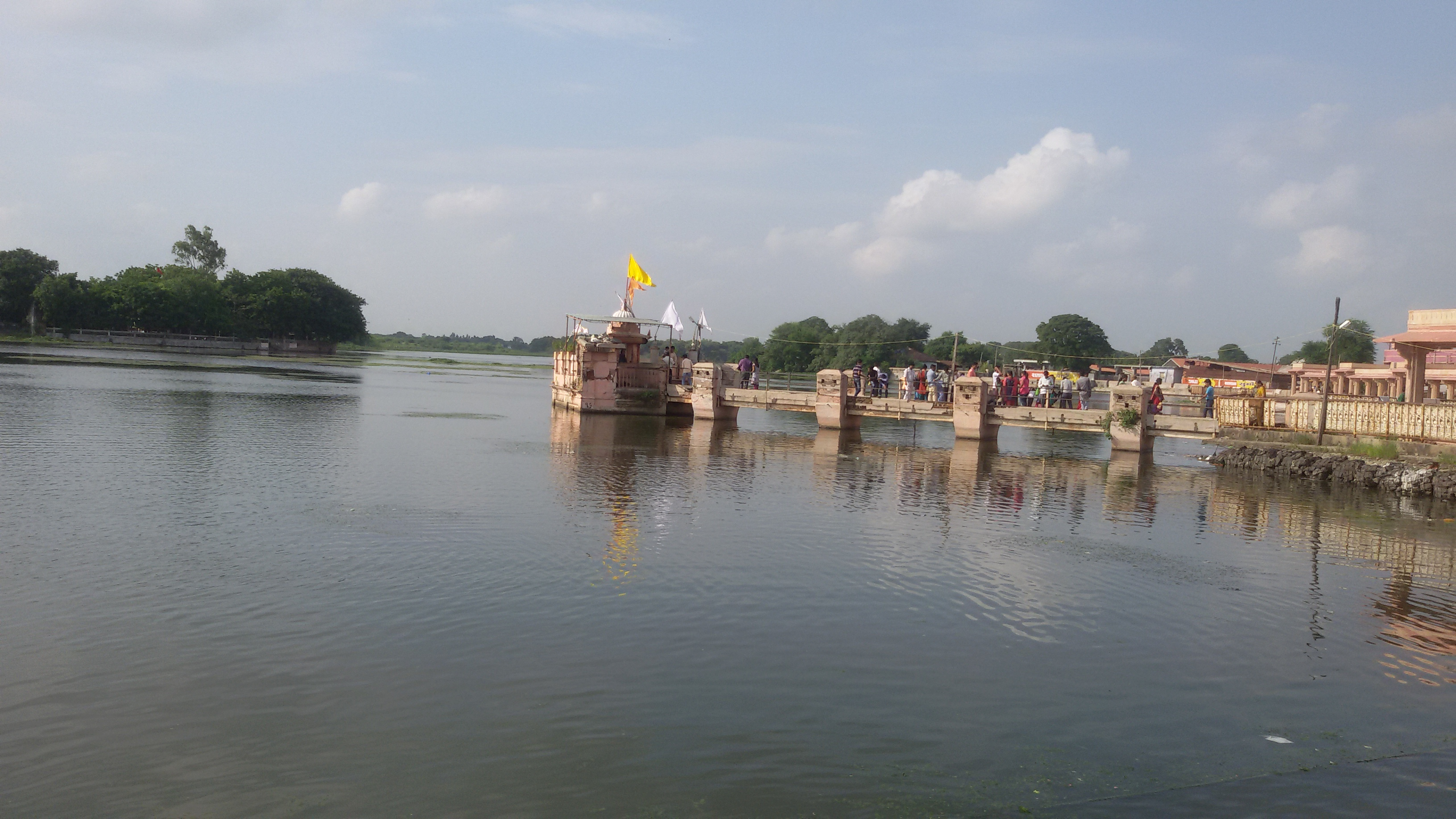
Gomati Ghat

According to the Ḍākor-māhātmya, a Rajput named Boḍāṇo aka Vijayasiṁha used to visit Dvārkādhīś at Dvārkā, but lived in Ḍākor. In 1151, when Boḍāṇā reached the age of eighty years, God told Boḍāṇā that he would join him in Ḍākor. Boḍāṇā borrowed a cart and bullocks from a local cowherd and sold his utensils to feed them, and made for Dvārakā. When he reached Dvārakā, the Gugalīs (temple priests of Dvārakā) suspected his intentions and put additional locks on the temple. However Dvārkānāth now named Raṇchoḍ himself slipped out of the temple and awoke Boḍāṇā and told him to drive away with him. When they left the city gates Raṇchoḍ himself drove the cart while Boḍāṇā slept. When the Gugalīs awoke in the morning to find Dvāraknāth missing, they chased Boḍāṇā back to Ḍākor, where he had hidden Raṇachoḍ in the Gomatī reservoir. Raṇchoḍ told Boḍāṇā to meet the Gugalīs and give them presents of curds, but the Gugalīs threw a lance at him. According to the mahātmya the lance instead landed on Raṇachoḍjī whose blood bloodied the waters of the Gomatī and revealed his location. The Gugalīs then tried to remove the image from the waters but were unsuccessful. The Gugalīs became repentant and began fasting to try remove their guilt. Boḍāṇā's wife Gaṅgā could not bear to see this sight, so when she was giving Raṇchoḍ his daily evening roṭalā, she offered to give him lāḍus if he bestowed grace on the Gugalīs and to not give him anything he did not. Raṇachoḍ told her that the Gugalīs were not missing him, but the gold and money his presence brought them. He told Gaṅgā to ask the Gugalīs if they would accept his weight in gold, and proceeded to gobble all the lāḍus. The Gugalīs agreed to this contract, but it was miraculously discovered that Gaṅgā's gold nose-ring weighed more Raṇchoḍ, following which the Gugalīs left. The mūrti in Dvārkā was replaced miraculously. The Ḍaṅka Purāṇa or Ḍaṅkapura-māhātmya was written at the end of the 17th century.

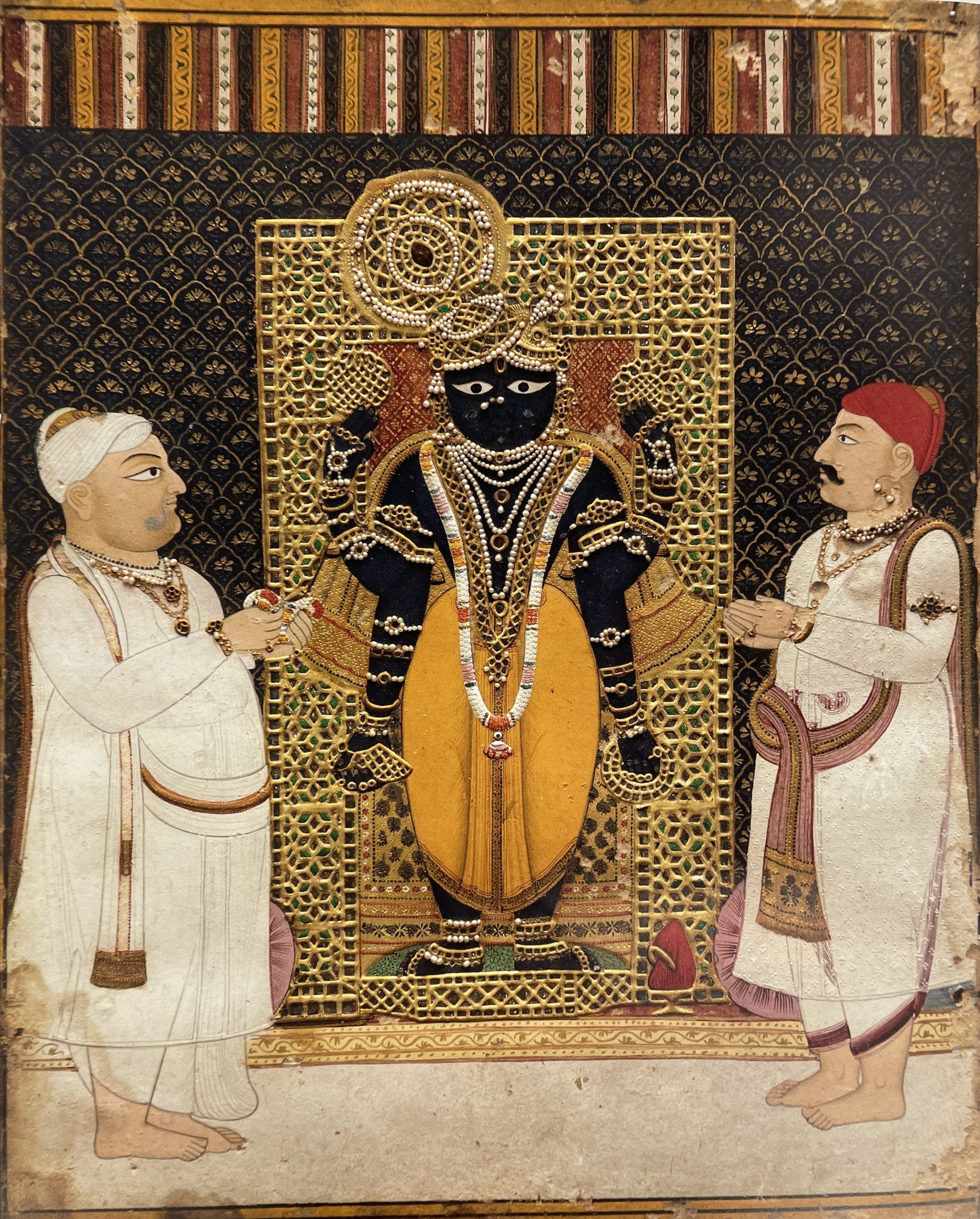
Raṇachoḍarāya with Patrons

In 1625, Dakor was visited by Harirāyjī, who reformed the sevā in the temple and ordered a group of Śrīgoḍ-Mevāḍā and Kheḍāvāl Brahmins to perform Vallabhite rituals at the temple. Ever since the visit whenever a Vallabhite Maharaj is present in the temple he becomes the acting sevak of the temple. Formerly the priests were Tapodhan Brahmins who used to attend to Śiva Ḍaṁkanāth before the arrival of Ḍākorajī.

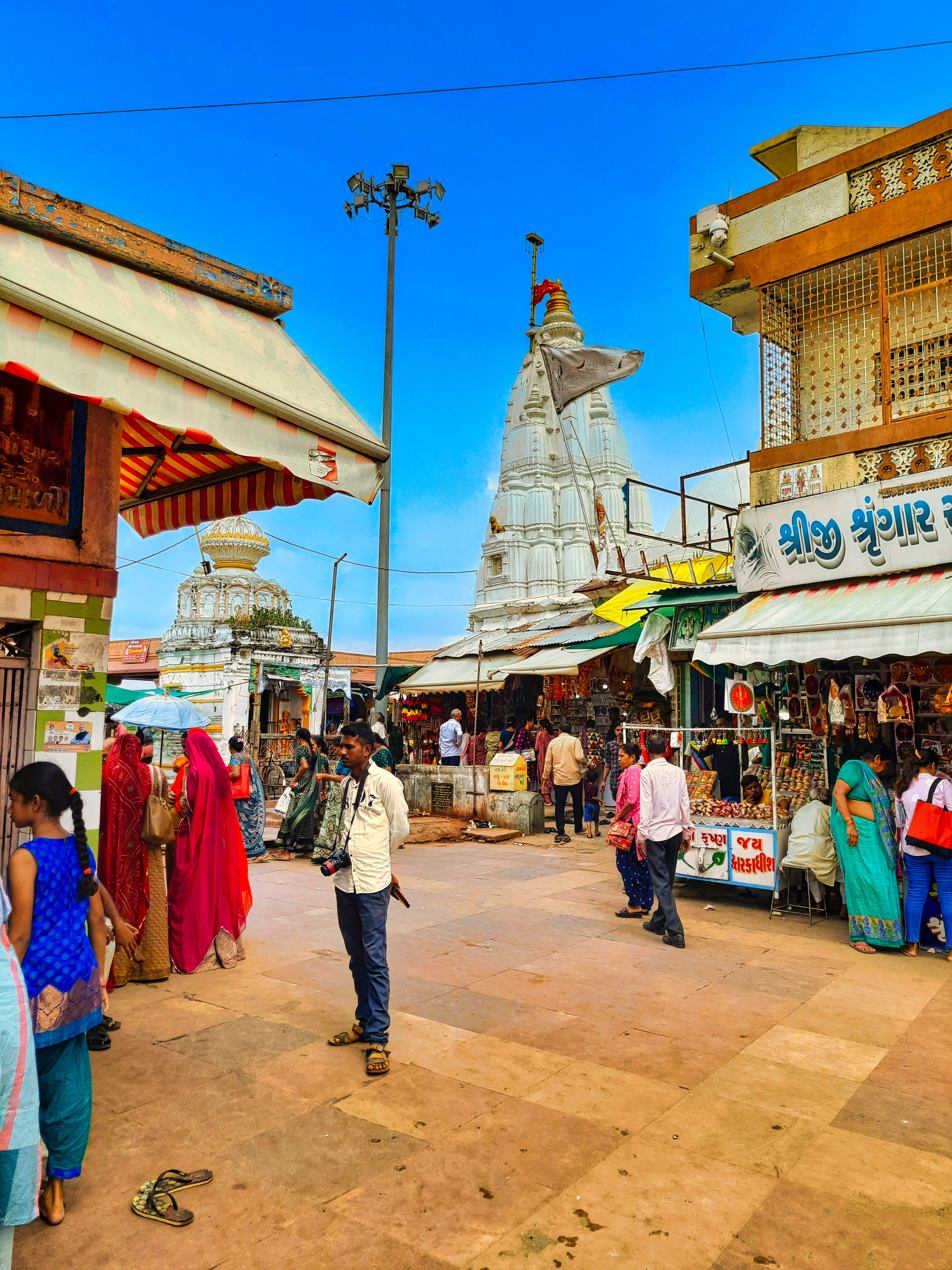
Ḍaṅkanātha temple (center)

According to the Ḍākor-māhātmya, a Bania named Nandana built a temple for Raṇchoḍjī now known as Lakshmiji's temple. The image of Raṇachoḍ was moved by a descendant of Boḍāṇā named Dīpasing. According to other accounts in 1734, Ratan Singh, vajir of the rāja of Mārwār Abhai Singh had Raṇchoḍjī installed in a new temple. Majmudar posits that the Ratan Singh was the true builder of the temple, but Ḍākor-māhātmya gave an alternative account because the author of māhātmya disliked Abhai Singh on account of his having ordered the assassination of Pilaji Gaekwad in Dakor in 1732.

In 1740, Momin Khan, viceroy of Gujarat under the emperor Muhammad Shah, issued documents ordering Mutasiddidār/Thāṇdār of Ṭhāsrā to not persecute the servants of Raṇchoḍjī nor appropriate their income from devotees, as well as assuring the servants of his protection.

The Mirāt-i-Ahmedi (compiled between 1750 and 1760) by Muhammad Ali Khan, the final Mughal Diwan of Gujarat, describes the legend of the removal of Raṇchoḍ from Dwarka to Ḍākor by Boḍāṇā.

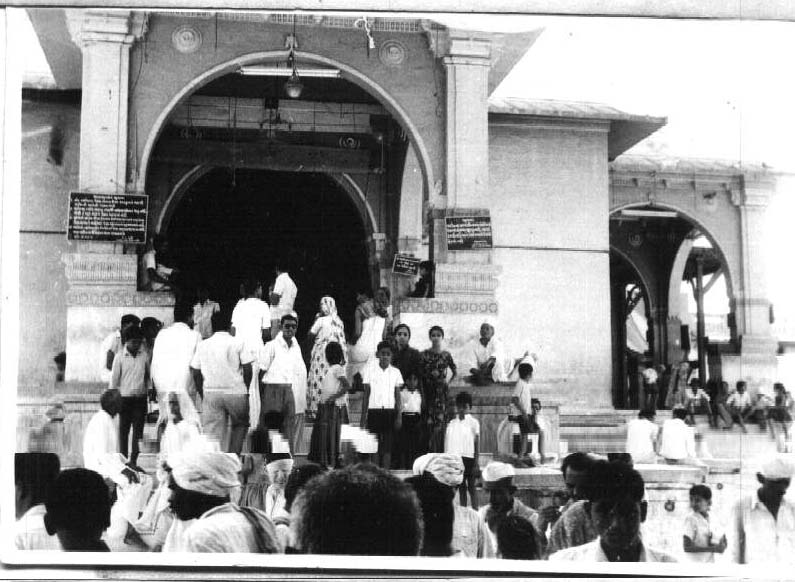
Ranchhodarai Temple, Dakor, 1957

The current temple was built by Gopāl Tāṁbvekar, a Dakṣiṇī Brahmin from Poona, who was a devotee of Veṅkaṭeśa. Construction began in AD 1769–70 and Raṇchoḍjī was moved into the new temple by Rāmasing, descendant of Boḍāṇā in 1770–71. Tāṁbvekar also was granted Dakor by Peśvā Mādhava Rāō. According to tradition when the temple was built Raṇachoḍ told Lakṣmī that the original temple should remain inhabited by her, and that he would visit her every Ekadaśī and Friday in the form of Bāla-Kr̥ṣṇa. Accordingly, on those days the icon of Gopāla Lāl is taken on elephant or carriage from the (current) Nija temple to Lakṣmījī's temple. The current Nija temple also contains images of Lakṣmī, Satyabhāmā, and Gopāla Lāl, the three of which are taken to the Sajjā temple at night.

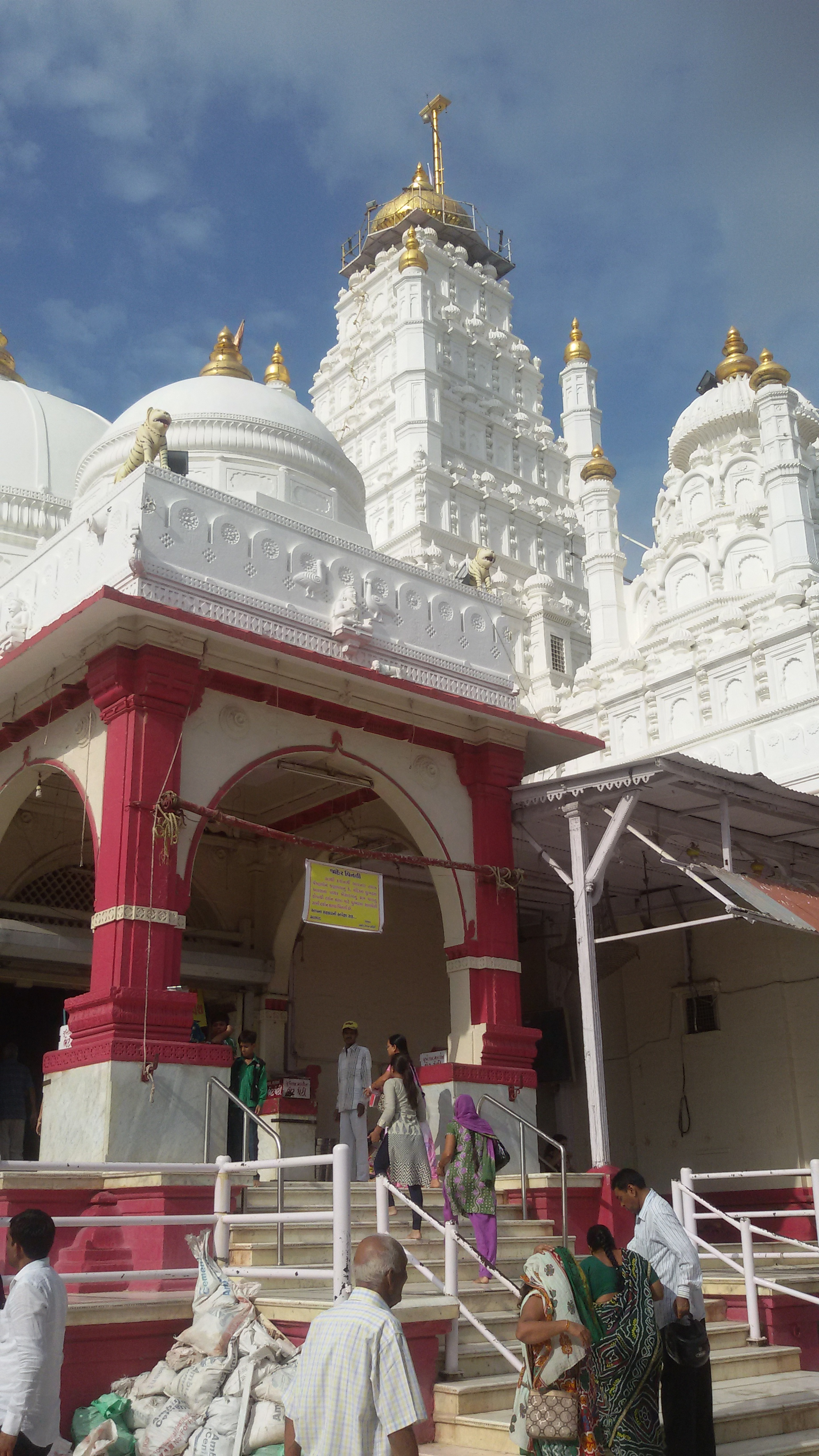
Ranchhodarai Temple, Dakor

The śikhara of the temple can be seen to have some Islamic influence, likely due to the use hired Muslim craftsmen from Pune. On Parvatī Hill in Pune there exists an older temple built for the wife of Mādhava Rāō, whose śikhara the Ḍākor temple imitated. Both of these śikharas bear resemblance to the parade coffins built for Muharram. The temple has 4 major śikharas which are capped in gold and 7 domes. The temple is surrounded by fort-like walls, and in the front are two towers which can be lit with lamps. The temple's maṇḍapa is on a raised platform twelve stairs up, such that the idol's āratī is visible from the highest ghāṭ on the Gomatī lake. The siṁhāsana ("throne [of the idol]") is made out of gold and was donated by the Gāyakavāḍa dynasty worth 1.25 lakh rupees at the time. Recently, paintings of scenes from the Bhāgavata Purāṇa, Mahābhārata, and Rāmāyaṇa were added to the walls of the central maṇḍapa. There also exists a Sanskrit inscription with the date of construction of the temple. Some 15 years after the construction of the current temple, a close imitation was built in the village of Sārasā near Anand, Gujarat which is currently used as the samādhi of Kuveradāsa.

After the region came under the control of the Gaekwads of Baroda, the rulers patronized the temple and its sevaks.

During English rule the temple's ownership of the village of Ḍākor was confirmed. In the 1860s and 1870, Vaiṣṇava Mahārājas Bhaṭṭajī and Maṭujī visited Dakor and served Raṇāchoḍarāy and patronized the temple. Much wealth was owned in the name of Raṇachoḍarāy and managed by the sevaks, including a banking firm called Gopāla Lālajī and cows. The sevaks in that era played a keen interest in the maintenance of prosperity of the temple through gifts, as well as maintaining orthodox beliefs, such as when a police commissioner named Hykoop was assaulted for trying to enter the temple which would have been considered ritual defilement.

=== Vaiṣṇava Style of Worship ===
Hariraya's visit to Ḍākor altered the worship performed to Raṇachoḍarāya to conform to the elaborate style of sevā ("service") proscribed by the Puṣṭimārga Vaiṣṇava sect. The Puṣṭimārga was founded by Vallabha in the early 16th century and placed particular theological importance on the bāla līlās ("child exploits") of Bāla Kr̥ṣṇa of Gokula. The sect found a highly receptive audience in Gujarat (particularly the merchant class) where Viṣṇu bhakti ("Viṣṇu devotion") had already reached a peak in the 15th century under the influence of the Bhāgavata Purāṇa, Gītā Govinda, and poems of Narasiṁha Mahetā. Vallabha's son Viṭṭhalanātha developed the sect's elaborate sevā rituals in which Kr̥ṣṇa idols would be offered sumptuous meals, kīrtanas, art, and dress during 8 fixed darśana times. According to the Caurāsī Baiṭhaka, Harirāya (a great-grandson of Viṭṭhalanātha) was in Ḍākor when he received a dream from Raṇachoḍarāya who informed Harirāya that he was currently in a hut and was being served by Brahmins (the Tapodhans) who bathed him, and ordered Harirāya to install him in a proper temple. Harirāya then enlisted Kheḍāvāḷ Brahmins to perform the bathing rites, and as compensation to the Tapodhans let them keep half the income the idol received. According to Giridharalālajīke 120 Vacanāmr̥ta Raṇachoḍarāya was lying upside down on a wall before Harirāya had the idol straightened and installed in a temple, and mentions the institution of Śrīgauḍ-Mevāḍ and Kheḍāvāḷ Brahmins alongside the Tapodhans. Despite the institution of Puṣṭimārga rites for the idol, the temple has continued to remain asectarian. The Tapodhan Brahmins are considered to be somewhat degraded because they consume the offerings devotees give to Śiva. The Śrīgauḍ-Mevāḍ Brahmins were instead given the duties of food preparation and waving of the āratīs and the Kheḍāvāḷs the duties of preparing and putting on Raṇachoḍarāya's clothes.

Festivals celebrated by the Raṇachoḍarāya temple
Month and Tithi	Festival
Kāratak sud 1	Annakūṭa / Govardhana Pūjā
Kāratak sud 8	Gopāṣṭamī
Kāratak sud 11	Devaūṭhī Ekādaśī
Kāratak sud 15	Devadivāḷī and the day Raṇachoḍarāya arrived in Ḍākor.
Māgasar sud 7	Gokulanātha's birthday
Māgasar vad 9	Viṭṭhalanātha's birthday
Mahā sud 5	Vasaṁta Paṁcamī
Mahā vad 5	Raṇachoḍarāya's Pāṭotsava, the day Raṇāchoḍarāya was installed in the current temple
Phāgaṇ sud 11	Kuṁja Ekādaśī, a Kr̥ṣṇa idol goes on horseback to Lakṣmī's temple
Phāgaṇ sud 15	Hoḷi
Phāgaṇ vad 1	Ḍolotsava
Caitra sud 1	Samvatsarī Utsava
Caitra sud 9	Rāma Navamī
Caitra vad 11	Vallabha's birthday
Vaiśākh sud 3	Akhātrīj
Vaiśakh sud 14	Nr̥siṁha Jayaṁtī
Jeṭh sud 10	Gaṁgā Daśāhāra / Yamunā Utsava
Jeṭh sud 15	Jaḷa Yātrā Utsava / Mahākesara Snāna
Āṣāḍh sud 2	Ratha Yātrā Utsava / Gomatī Pradakṣinā / an idol rides on an elephant
Āṣāḍh sud 11	Deva Śayanī Ekādaśī
Āṣāḍh vad 11	Hiṁḍoḷā swinging begins for a month
Śrāvaṇ sud 3	Ṭhakarāṇī Trīja, a Kr̥ṣṇa idol swings on a glass hiṁḍoḷā.
Śrāvaṇ sud 12	Pavitra Ekādaśī
Śrāvaṇ sud 15	Rakṣā Baṁdhana
Śrāvaṇ vad 2–3	Hiṁḍoḷā Visarjana, hiṁḍoḷā month ends
Śrāvaṇ vad 8	Janmāṣṭamī
Śrāvaṇ vad 9	Nanda Mahotsava
Bhādaravā sud 12	Vāmana Jayaṁtī
Āso sud 10	Vijaya Daśamī
Āso sud 15	Śarada Pūrṇimā Rāsotsava
Āso vad 11	Ramā Ekādaśī
Āso vad 12	Vāgha Bārasa
Āso vad 13	Dhana Terasa
Āso vad 14	Kāḷī Caudasa, Rūpa Caturadaśī, Abhyaṁga Snāna
Āso vad 30	Dīvāḷī

== Sources ==
- Majmudar, M.R. (1947). "Dwārkā Image of Raṇchhoḍjī and the temple at Ḍākore". Journal of the University of Bombay. 16.
- Majamudāra, Maṁjulāla Ra. (1984). Vaiṣṇavatīrtha Ḍākora. Śrī Sayājī Sāhityamāḷā, puṣpa 362 (in Gujarati). Vaḍodarā: Prācyavidyā Mandira, Mahārāja Sayājīrāva Viśvavidyālaya.
- Mallison, Françoise (1983). "Development of early Krishnaism in Gujarāt: Viṣṇu – Raṇchoḍ – Kr̥ṣṇa". In Thiel-Horstmann, Monika (ed.). Bhakti in current research, 1979-1982 : proceedings of the Second International Conference on Early Devotional Literature in New Indo-Aryan Languages, St. Augustin, 19-21 March 1982. Collectanea Instituti Anthropos. Vol. 30. Berlin: Dietrich Reimer Verlag.
