= Heidi Pauwels =

Belgian literary scholar

- Occupation: Literary scholar
- Awards: Guggenheim Fellowship (2011)

Academic background
- Education: KU Leuven (BA and MA); University of Washington (PhD)
- Thesis: Harirām Vyās's Rās-pañcādhyāyī and Mãn kī śrikhalā: A Critical Interpretation (1994)
- Doctoral advisor: Alan Entwistle

Academic work
- Sub-discipline: Hindu studies; Hindustani literature
- Institutions: School of Oriental and African Studies; University of Washington

Heidi Rika Maria Pauwels is a Belgian literary scholar. A 2011 Guggenheim Fellow, she has written and edited several books, including The Goddess as Role Model: Sītā and Rādhā in Scripture and on Screen (2008). She is a Professor and South Asian Program Coordinator at the University of Washington.

== Biography ==
Pauwels obtained her BA and MA (both in Eastern philology and history) at KU Leuven in 1983 and 1986 respectively. After spending a year as a Indo-Belgian Cultural Exchange student at the Vrindaban Research Institute (1987-1988) and a German Academic Exchange Service PhD student at the University of Cologne (1989-1990), she obtained her PhD in Asian languages and literature at the University of Washington in 1994. Her doctoral dissertation Harirām Vyās's Rās-pañcādhyāyī and Mãn kī śrikhalā: A Critical Interpretation was supervised by Alan Entwistle.

After working as a lecturer in Hindi at the School of Oriental and African Studies since 1994, Pauwels returned to UW in 1996 to become a visiting assistant professor. In 1997, she became a faculty assistant professor. She was promoted to associate professor in 2002 and full professor in 2009.

Pauwels specializes in fields like Hindi literature and Hinduism. She has written and edited several books within these fields, including The Goddess as Role Model (2008). She has also co-edited special issues of Journal of the Royal Asiatic Society and South Asian History and Culture. In 2011, she was awarded a Guggenheim Fellowship. In 2020, she received a National Endowment for the Humanities Fellow for her book The Voice of India’s 18th-Century Mona Lisa. In addition to Hindi and Urdu literature, she has taught courses on pop music, as well as specialized courses on the Mahabharata, the Ramayana, and the theme of love and war in Indian literature.

== Works ==
=== Monographs ===
- Krishna's Round Dance Reconsidered: Harirām Vyās’s Hindi (1996)
- In Praise of Holy Men: Hagiographic poems by and about Hariram Vyas (2002)
- The Goddess as Role Model: Sītā and Rādhā in Scripture and on Screen (2008) (Note: Reviews of this book:)
- Cultural Exchange in Eighteenth-Century India: Poetry and Paintings from Kishangarh (2015)
- Mobilizing Krishna’s World: The Writings of Prince Sāvant Singh of Kishangarh (2017)
- The Voice of the Indian Mona Lisa: Gender and Culture in Rajasthan (2023)
- (with Purnima Dhavan) Vali Dakhani and the Early Rekhtah Networks: Sharing Poetry’s Pleasures (2025)

=== Edited books ===
- Kṛṣṇa's Round Dance Reconsidered: Harirām Vyās's Hindī Rāspañcādhyāyī (1996)
- (with Alan Entwistle, Carol Salomon, and Michael Shapiro) Studies in Early Literature in New Indo-Aryan Languages: proceedings of the sixth international conference on Early Literature in New Indo-Aryan languages (1999)
- Indian Literature and Popular Cinema: Recasting Classics (2007)
- Patronage and Popularisation, Pilgrimage and Procession: Channels of Transcultural Translation and Transmission in Early Modern South Asia (2009)
- (with Monika Horstmann) Indian Satire in the Period of First Modernity (2012)
