= Vallabha =

Hindu philosopher (1478–1530)

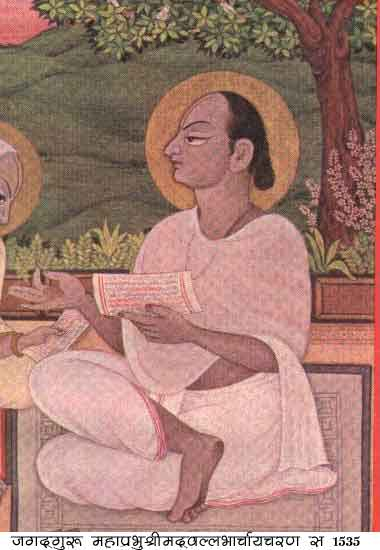

Personal life
- Born: May 7, 1478 (Note: All Vikram Samvat life event dates in this article have been converted into the Gregorian calendar using https://www.harysdalvi.com/calcalc .)
- Died: July 7, 1530 (aged 52) Vārāṇasī (now in Uttar Pradesh, India)
- Spouse: Mahālakṣmī (m. 1502)
- Children: Gopīnātha; Viṭṭhalanātha
- Parents: Lakṣmaṇa Bhaṭṭa (father); Illammāgārū (mother)

Religious life
- Religion: Hinduism (Vaishnavism)
- Order: Vedanta
- Founder of: Puṣṭimārga
- Philosophy: Śuddhādvaita

Vallabha, also known as Vallabhācārya or Vallabha Dīkṣita (Note: "Vallabha calls himself just 'Dīkṣita'") (May 7, 1478 – July 7, 1530 CE), was the founder of the Kr̥ṣṇa-centered Puṣṭimārga sect of Vaishnavism, and propounded the philosophy of Śuddhādvaita.

His biography is depicted in several sectarian Puṣṭimārga hagiographies. Born into a Telugu Brahmin family, Vallabha studied Hindu philosophy from an early age, then traveled throughout the Indian subcontinent, particularly the Braj (Vraja) region, for over 20 years. He became one of the leading figures of the devotional Bhakti movement. He won many philosophical debates against the followers of Advaita Vedānta. He began the institutional worship of Śrī Nāthajī on Govardhana Hill. He acquired many followers in the Gangetic plain and Gujarat. After his death, the leadership of his sampradāya passed to his elder son Gopīnātha.

Vallabha's philosophy promoted the householder lifestyle over asceticism, suggesting that through loving devotion to the deity Kr̥ṣṇa, any householder could achieve salvation. He authored many texts including Aṇubhāṣya (his commentary on the Brahma Sutras), Ṣoḍaśa Grantha or sixteen tracts and several commentaries on the Bhāgavata Purāṇa.

== Life ==
=== Sources and Dating ===
Events from Vallabha's life are recounted in several sectarian Puṣṭimārga texts. Among the Braj Bhasha sources are the Caurāsī Vaiṣṇavan kī Vārtā, Śrī Nāthajī Prākaṭya kī Vārtā, and Caurāsī Baiṭhak Caritra. According to Barz, the most important Sanskrit source is the Śrīvallabhadigvijaya.

According to Alan Entwistle, the Caurāsī Baiṭhak Caritra is a post-early 18th century text, due to internal references to other sectarian texts. According to Saha and Hawley, the Caurāsī Baiṭhak Caritra dates to the mid-18th century. Ṭaṁḍana, Bachrach, and several Puṣṭimārga leaders state the work was composed in the 19th century. Ṭaṁḍana also considers the Gharu Vārtā, Nija Vārtā, and Śrī Ācāryajī kī Prākaṭya Vārtā to be 19th century texts which were based on the older Caurāsī Vaiṣṇavana kī Vārtā and Do Sau Bāvana Vaiṣṇavana kī Vārtā. Bhatt states the Nija Vārtā is "full of interpolations and shows the lack of historical sense", and if it was in fact originally the work of the traditionally accepted author, Vallabha's grandson Gokulanātha, it was far removed from the original text. The Caurāsī Baiṭhak Caritra (attributed to Harirāya) enumerates the 84 baiṭhaks ("seats") of Vallabha across India where he sat and preached Puṣṭimarga tenets. According to Saha, the text seeks to promote Vallabha as an exceptional philosopher and miracle worker who acquires converts wherever; the text does this by portraying Vallabha as a digvijayin ("world-conqueror") who establishes the superiority of his philosophy in the Char Dham.

The Śrī Nāthajī kī Prākaṭya Vārtā in its current form was likely written in the 1860s, although its contents were orally known prior to the 19th century. The Vallabha Digvijaya or Yadunātha Digvijaya claims to have been composed in 1610, however modern scholars state the text was composed around the turn of the 20th century.

Other Sanskrit texts include Gadādhara Dviveda's Sampradāya-Pradīpa (colophon states A.D. 1552–53, but according to Hawley, actually from the latter half of the 1600s), Muralīdharadāsa's Śrīvallabhācāryacarita (c. 1573), Prabhucaritaciṁtāmaṇi (attributed to Devakīnaṁdana, which is baseless according to Bhatt), and the Gujarati poem Vallabhākhyāna by Gopāladāsa (c. 1580). Another Braj Bhasha work, Saṁpradāyakalpadruma, which is claimed to be composed by Viṭṭhalanātha Bhaṭṭa (a grandson of Viṭṭhalanātha's second daughter Yamunā) cannot be considered to be of ancient origin according to Śāstrī. Other texts by Gokulanātha's followers include Kalyāṇa Bhaṭṭa's Kallola, Keśavadāsa's Gujarati Vallabhavela, and Gopāladāsa Vyārāvāḷā's Gujarati Prākaṭya-Siddhāṁta.

According to scholars, the life of Vallabha as depicted in traditional sources contains many miracles, supernatural events, and "patently implausible features". Vallabha is considered by followers of the Puṣṭimārga to be an ideal divine incarnation who was born for a supernatural purpose, and his hagiographies mean to portray a living intimate relationship with Kr̥ṣṇa to serve as an example to devotees. Barz (1992) gives biographical account of Vallabha which includes these traditional elements. His biography has been criticized by Vaudeville for relying solely on English and Hindi Vallabhite sources and a lack of critical analysis of them typical of a Western Indologist. Śāstrī, commenting on the presence of miracles in Vallabha's biographies, notes that the texts authored by the followers of Gokulanātha, a grandson of Vallabha, contain no mention of miracles in relation to Vallabha and his second son Viṭṭhalanātha (Gokulanātha's father) making them valuable sources. This is due to the fact that these followers instead consider Gokulanātha to be God in human form, with Vallabha and Viṭṭhalanātha only being revered ācāryas. No single text contains a full biography of Vallabha, and different sources contain inconsistent and contradictory information, likely due to internal fragmentation of the religious community from the 17th to 19th centuries.

=== Childhood ===
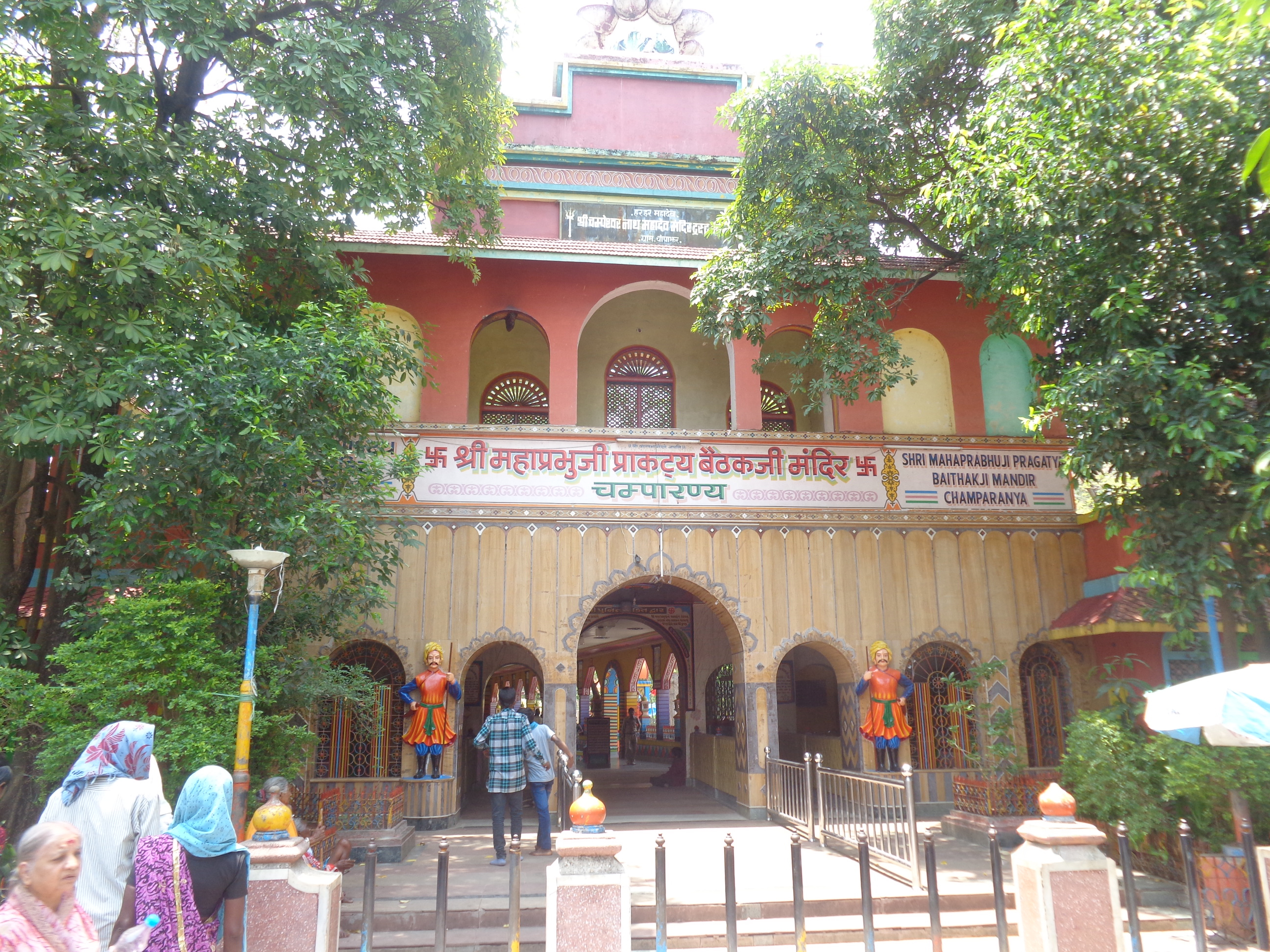
Site worshipped as the birthplace of Vallabha in Campāraṇya, identified in the late 19th century.

According to tradition, Vallabha's family was Velanāṭa or Vellanāḍu Telugu Brahmins who belonged to the Bhāradvāja gotra and the Taittirīya branch of the Yajurveda. Their ancestral village was Kāṅkaravāḍa on the southern bank of the Godāvarī River. Keśvararāma Kāśīrāma Śāstrī identifies the village of Kāṁkara (Kanker, Chhattisgarh) with Kāṁkarapāṁḍhu or Kāṁkaravāḍa.

According to some sources such as the Śrīvallabhadigvijaya, Vallabha's birth occurred in the forests of Campāraṇya, due to his parents fleeing Vārāṇasī in fear of Muslim invasion. These sources depict his birth as miraculous, with his parents initially leaving the seemingly still-born infant beneath a śamī tree, before being recalled by a supernatural voice to see Vallabha alive and surrounded by fire. According to other hagiographies such as Śrī Nāthajī Prākaṭya kī Vārtā, Vallabha appeared in the Agnikuṇḍ ("Pool of Fire") in Mathurā.

Most hagiographies date Vallabha's birth to Vaiśākha vada 11, 1535 V.S. (May 7, 1478 CE). Though conversion of this date into the Gregorian calendar is disputed among scholars (with some putting Vallabha's birth in 1478 and some in 1479), Hawley confirms the year 1478 after adjusting for the calendar used in Braj. The followers of Gokulanātha, one of Vallabha's grandsons, consider Vallabha's year of birth to be 1473 CE. G.H. Bhatt, on comparing the two dates, states that the year 1473 CE is correct. In his view, the sources mentioning 1473 CE are older and more authentic than those mentioning 1478 CE.

Soon after Vallabha's birth his family moved back to Vārāṇasī. His education consisted of learning Sanskrit texts such as the Upaniṣads, Vedas, and Purāṇas.

According to the Śrī Govardhananāthajī ke Prākaṭya kī Vārtā (19th century), Mādhavendra Purī (c. 1420–1490) taught Vallabha in Varanasi, however this is considered "highly improbable" by Entwistle due to the dates of Vallabha's birth and Mādhavendra's death. When asked what he would like as a fee for teaching Vallabha, Mādhavendra asked to serve Śrī Nāthajī, as he had a premonition that Vallabha would establish the formal worship of the deity. When Mādhavendra Purī arrived at Govardhan Hill, the image was being already being worshipped as a snake deity by the local villagers, and as Kr̥ṣṇa by Saddu Pāṇḍe. Mādhavendra Purī adorned Śrī Nāthajī with a garland and turban decoration, and offered him milk (he was told by Śrī Nāthajī that he would only accept solid food when Vallabha arrived). The text also claims that Mādhavendra was appointed mukhiyā of the Bengali priests, which is also considered unlikely by Entwistle since the Śrī Nāthajī temple was built after his lifetime. Mādhavendra Purī later went to South India to get sandalwood, from which he never returned. Other Puṣṭimārga texts and the Gauḍīya Vaiṣṇava tradition posit contrasting narratives surrounding the identity of Mādhavendra Puri's students and the establishment of the Kr̥ṣṇa image on Govardhana Hill.

=== First pilgrimage ===
Nearing the end of his life, Lakṣmaṇa Bhaṭṭa decided to take his wife and 10-year-old son along on a pilgrimage to southern India. They first stopped at the Vaishnava temple of Jagannātha in Purī in 1489. The local ruler was sponsoring a great philosophical debate where four questions were posed to scholars: "What is the foremost scripture? Who is the foremost deity? Which is the most effective mantra? What is the easiest and best action?", to which Vallabha responded with the Bhagavad Gītā, Kr̥ṣṇa, any of Kr̥ṣṇa's names, and sevā (service) to Kr̥ṣṇa, whereupon Jagannātha wrote a śloka in support of his response and condemning the supporters of Advaita Vedānta.

In 1490, they reached the temple of Veṅkaṭeśvara at Tirupati, where Lakṣmaṇa Bhaṭṭa died, and Illammāgārū began to live with her brother in Vijayanagara.

=== Grand victory at Vijayanagara ===
When Vallabha was living in his ancestral village of Kāṅkaravāḍa, he heard of a philosophical debate (śāstrārtha) being held in at the court of King Kr̥ṣṇadevarāya of Vijayanagara, and that the Vaiṣṇava schools of thought were being beaten by Advaita Vedānta philosophers. Vallabha immediately went to Vijayanagara to join the debate, and entered the Vaiṣṇava camp led by Vyāsatīrtha of the Mādhva school. Vallabha through his erudition and debate skills defeated the Advaita philosophers, and was rewarded by Kr̥ṣṇadevarāya with large amounts of gold (most of which he distributed among Brahmins).

Vallabha was also offered the prestigious title of ācārya from the Mādhva sampradāya and the Viṣṇusvāmī sampradāya. Vallabha chose to become ācārya of the Viṣṇusvāmī school. Very little is known of the Viṣṇusvāmī school, and by Vallabha's time its followers were few. The majority view among sectarian followers is that Vallabha chose to become ācārya of that school in order to make his own doctrines more prestigious, and that there is likely no real connection between the ideas of Viṣṇusvāmī and Vallabha. A minority of followers believe there is a connection between the philosophies of Viṣṇusvāmī and Vallabha. Modern scholars hold there is no legitimate connection between the two philosophies. According to Keśvararāma Kāśīrāma Śāstrī, Vallabha himself did not claim to belong to Viṣṇusvāmī's school. He notes that in the Subodhini, Vallabha claims Viṣṇusvāmī's devotional path belongs to the tamāsa guṇa, while his own is nirguṇa. Only later writers such as Gosvāmī Puruṣottama, Yogī Gopeśvara, and Gadādharadāsa link Vallabha's and Lakṣmaṇa Bhaṭṭa's philosophical school to Viṣṇusvāmī. It is also stated in traditional biographies that Bilavamaṁgala (a scholar of Viṣṇusvāmī's school) waited 700 years for Vallabha to take his seat. Rather Vallabha himself states that despite Bilvamaṁgala's Māyāvāda tendencies, through his devotion he can achieve mokṣa.

According to sectarian literature, this debate occurred shortly after Lakṣmaṇa Bhaṭṭa's death in 1490 when Vallabha was only 13 years old; however, Kr̥ṣṇadevarāya only became king of Vijayanagara in 1509.

The debate is mentioned in the Caurāsī Baiṭhak Caritra and but is not found in independent historical sources. According to Saha, the Vijayanagara episode is meant to portray "the image of a victorious Vallabha winning the subcontinent for Kr̥ṣṇa". It is also mentioned in the Sampradāya-Pradīpa, whose narrative is described as "clearly counterfactual" by Hawley who posits the episode was written for the purpose of furthering the interests of the Puṣṭimārga in the late 17th century.

=== Reception of the Brahmasambandha mantra and installation of Śrī Nāthajī ===
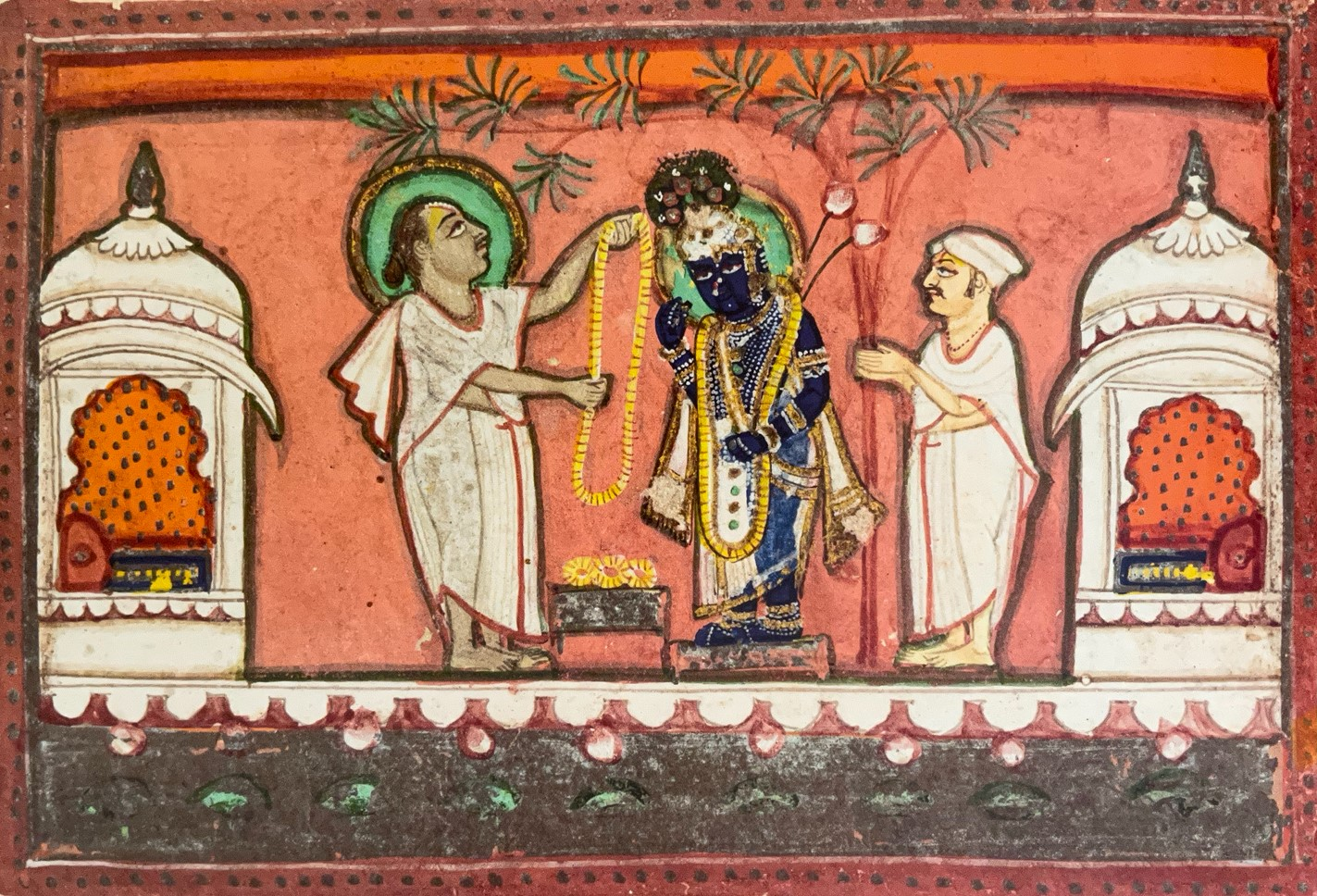
Vallabha giving Kr̥ṣṇa a sacred thread after receiving the Brahmasambandha mantra. Dāmodaradāsa Harasānī on the right.

In 1493, Vallabha is said to have had a dream where Kr̥ṣṇa ordered him to go to Govardhana Hill and establish proper service (sevā) to his image (svarūpa) that had appeared there years ago. When he arrived in Gokula in 1494, Vallabha had a vision where Kr̥ṣṇa appeared before him and bestowed upon him the Brahmasambandha mantra, which was to be used to clean the flaws of a human soul. The next morning, Vallabha administered the mantra to his companion Dāmodaradāsa Harasānī, who became the first member of the Puṣṭimārga (Vallabha Sampradaya). Most sources state these events occurred in Gokula, except the Śrī Nāthajī Prākaṭya kī Vārtā which states it happened in Jharkhand.

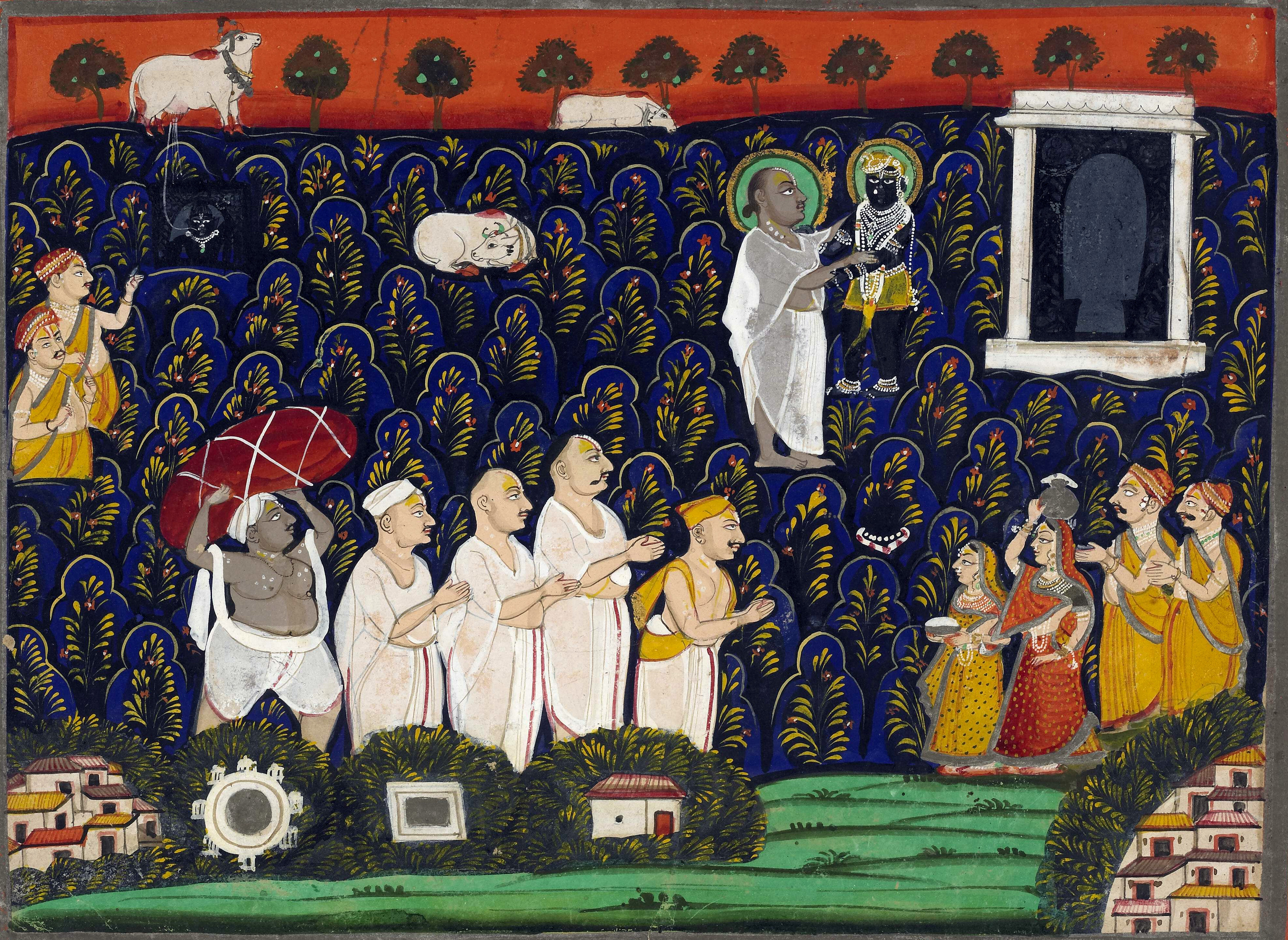
The discovery of Śrīnāthajī by Saddū Pāṇḍe (far left) and Vallabha's later meeting with the company of followers (dressed in white) and local Braj folk (bottom right).

When Vallabha came to Govardhana Hill, he went to the house of Saḍḍu Pāṇḍe. Saḍḍu Pāṇḍe had received a vision from Kr̥ṣṇa years earlier that told him a stone that had appeared on Govardhana Hill was his own svarūpa and that he should give offerings to it. The image was known as Devadamana; Vallabha announced that it was actually the svarupa of Śrī Govardhananāthajī (shortened to Śrī Nāthajī) and initiated an ascetic named Rāmdās Chauhān to perform the regular worship. In 1499 a wealthy merchant from Ambālā named Pūrṇamalla Khatrī began building a temple for Srī Nāthajī.

=== Personal life ===
Vallabha may have intended to remain a lifelong celibate brahmacārī, but during his second pilgrimage of India between 1501 and 1503, he had gone to Paṁḍḥarapura to view the god Viṭṭhala or Viṭhobā (a form of Kr̥ṣṇa). There Vallabha was ordered by Viṭṭhala to marry. Some sectarian sources assert this was because Viṭṭhala wanted to take birth as his son, and others say it was to create a line of descendants to preserve and promote Vallabha's version of bhakti-mārga. This episode is mentioned in the Vallabhākhyāna, Nija Vārtā, and Sampradāya Kalpadruma and according to Entwistle is a later myth.

Following his caste traditions and practices, Vallabha married Mahālakṣmī (aka Akkājī) sometime between 1502 and 1504, a Vārāṇasī girl of his own caste who began living with him upon maturity c. 1510–1512. Vallabha had two houses, one at Aṛaila on the Yamunā river across Prayāgarāja, and at Caranāṭa near Vārāṇasī. According to Saha, the location of his home provided a central location which allowed him to access to preach and acquire disciples throughout northern and central India.

His first son, Gopīnātha, was born in 1512 at Aṛaila and according to sectarian tradition was the avatāra of Balarāma, elder brother of Kr̥ṣṇa. His second son, Viṭṭhalanātha, was born in 1515 at Caranāṭa, and is considered the avatar of Viṭṭhala.

=== Pilgrimages and preaching tours of India ===
Vallabha made three pilgrimages throughout India which are documented in later sectarian sources. These pilgrimages are stated to have taken place between 1479 and 1530, although Saha doubts the accuracy of the dates. At pilgrimage sites such as Dvārakā, Kannauja, Purī, Mathurā, Gokula, and Govardhana, Vallabha had theological debates and attracted followers and devotees. He made extensive conversion campaigns in the Gangetic Plain and Gujarat, where he attracted converts from various castes including Bhumihars, Rajputs, Gurjars, Ahirs, Kurmis, and Vaniyas, Bhatias, Kanbis, and Patidars respectively. In the Caurāsī Vaiṣṇavan kī Vārtā, the lives of eighty-four of Vallabha's most notable devotees are narrated. Of the 84 devotees, 39 were Brahmins, 36 were mercantile or landowning Kshatriyas, 5 were Vaishyas, and 6 were Shudras.

Only scholarly theory for why Vallabha's theology was attractive to these groups was that of social mobility. For agrarian castes, particularly in Gujarat, the emphasis on purity gave higher status. For mercantile castes, purity as well as the emphasis on restraint and frugality in daily life elevated their status, while wealth could then be funnelled toward religiously meritorious sevā to Kr̥ṣṇa.

Another reason was that Vallabha promoted a househoulder life-affirming, socially conservative view that appealed to castes that depended on social and political stability for their livelihoods, notably in the context of splintering Muslim sultanates in India.

=== Death ===
In 1530, Vallabha took a vow of renunciation and withdrew to the banks of the Gaṅgā river in Vārāṇasī. After a month, he summoned his sons Gopīnātha and Viṭṭhalanatha, and designated the 18 or 19 year old Gopīnātha as his successor. According to sectarian accounts, he walked into the Gaṅgā and vanished in a flash of light. This event is said to have occurred on Āṣāḍha suda 3, 1587 V.S. (July 7, 1530).

== Works ==
Vallabha composed several texts during his lifetime (all in Sanskrit) most notable of which are:

- Aṇubhāṣya, a partial commentary on the Brahma Sūtra-s up to III.23
- Subodhini, a partial commentary on the Bhāgavata Purāṇa (full commentary on skandhas 1-3 and 10, and partial commentary on skandhas 4,7, and 11)
- Tattvārthadīpanibandha, a text interpreting existing Hindu scriptures through Vallabha's philosophy of Śuddhādvaita
- Tattvārthadīpanibandhaprakāśa, a partial commentary on the Tattvārthadīpanibandha (full commentary for parts 1-2 and partial for part 3)
- Ṣoḍaśagrantha, sixteen treatises on important facets of Śuddhādvaita and theology of the Puṣṭimārga

There are also other texts attributed to Vallabha some of which are considered to be either lost or not actually composed by him. These include Jaiminīyasūtrabhāṣya, Pātrāvalambanam, Śrīpuruṣottamanāmasahasram, Trividhanāmāvalī, Premāmr̥tam, Parivr̥ddhāṣṭakam, and Madhurāṣṭakam. Smith notes that it is possible for Vallabha's work to have been lost in the first twenty years after his death, as his family became embroiled in disputes until Viṭṭhalanātha's final accession as head of the family and sect after the deaths of Gopīnātha and his son Puruṣottama.

=== Aṇubhāṣya ===
In the Aṇubhāṣya Vallabha provides formal philosophical proof for Śuddhādvaita; the text is highly intellectual in nature. Vallabha argues that the jīva ("individual soul") is inseparable from akṣarabrahman ("the absolute all-encompassing universe") yet dependent on God's grace. He argues that jīvas due to their svabhāva ("personal nature") and adhikāri ("eligibility") are either attracted to the religious path of knowledge or of devotion. He states the fruit of knowledge is mokṣa, union with an abstract, absolute, impersonal akṣarabrahman. In contrast, the higher fruit of devotion is entrance into nityalīlā (both in life or after death), which is the state of observing and participating in God's spontaneous and creative nature.

=== Tattvārthadīpanibandha ===
This text is divided into three sections: Śāstrārtha, Sarvanirṇaya, and Bhāgavatārtha. In the Śāstrārthaprakaraṇa, Vallabha gives his view on the contents of the Bhagavad Gītā, which he considers to be highest śāstra due to it embodying the words of Kr̥ṣṇa. He discusses various topics including the nature of the universe and God and argues that bhakti ("devotion") is based on knowledge of Kr̥ṣṇa as depicted in the Bhagavad Gītā and Bhāgavata Purāṇa. In the Sarvanirṇayaprakaraṇa, Vallabha surveys the philosophies of rival schools and asserts the superiority of his own views on devotion and the nature of souls to the universe. In the Bhāgavatārthaprakaraṇa, Vallabha gives his view on the Bhāgavata Purāṇa as an entire text, its skandhas ("canto"), prakaraṇas ("topical division"), and adhyāyas ("chapter").

=== Subhodinī ===
This commentary on the Bhāgavata Purāṇa is Vallabha's most esoteric work, and provides commentary on the text at a deeper level than the Bhāgavatārthaprakaraṇa down to the vākya (sentence"), pada ("word"), and akṣara ("syllable"). In this text Vallabha uses Alaṃkāraśāstra (classical Indian aesthetic theory) to analyze devotional experiences.

=== Śoḍaśagrantha ===
This text has 16 short treatises.

1. Yamunāṣṭakam: esoteric hymn to the river goddess Yamunā which is recited daily by followers
2. Bālabodha: explains the puruṣārtha (four goals of a human life) according to rival schools of thought
3. Siddhāntamuktāvalī: explains the value of Kr̥ṣṇa sevā on the terrestrial, spiritual, and celestial planes as well as different types of worship depending on an individual's ability
4. Puṣṭipravāhamaryādābheda: describes the three types of jīvas: puṣṭi, maryādā, and pravāha
5. Siddhāntarahasya: Vallabha's account of Kr̥ṣṇa's instructions to him on Brahmasambandha
6. Navaratna: a hymn in which Vallabha urges devotees to shun distresses as they distract from Kr̥ṣṇa sevā and to treat them as a part of līlā
7. Antaḥkaraṇaprabodha: Vallabha urges his own heart to be free of worry and have singleminded devotion to Kr̥ṣṇa
8. Vivekadhairyāśraya: summarizes Vallabha's views on discrimination, patience, and divine refuge
9. Catuḥślokī: four verse hymn that explains the puruṣārtha as devotional acts appropriate to the Puṣṭimārga
10. Śrīkr̥ṣṇāśraya: explains why Kr̥ṣṇa should be the sole refuge for devotees, why he is superior to other deities, and why devotion to him is the only salvation from Kali Yuga, which it also describes
11. Bhaktivardhinī: explains the how devotion silently increases through various stages and explains the different qualities of lifestyles with respect to devotion
12. Jalabhedha: classifies the 20 kinds of devotees who differ based on bhāva ("emotional disposition") and spiritual capabilities by using water as an analogy
13. Pañcapadyāni: classifies the different kind of listeners to Kr̥ṣṇa's stories and praises
14. Saṃnyāsanirṇayaḥ: Vallabha explains the conditions for renunciation of worldly life and how renunciates dedicated to bhakti differ from those dedicated to jñāna
15. Nirodhalakṣaṇa: describes the concept of nirodha, living disengagement from wordly life and single minded dedication to Kr̥ṣṇa, which Vallabha states he has achieved
16. Sevāphalam: describes the (post-death) rewards of Kr̥ṣṇa devotion, with a description of the otherworldly gifts that allow love of Kr̥ṣṇa to flourish in a graced mortal body

== Philosophy ==
Within the comparative framework of Vedāntic schools, Vallabha's affirmation of the world as a real and untainted manifestation of Brahman — as opposed to Śaṅkara's doctrine of māyā — places his system in the dualist-non-dualist spectrum alongside Nimbarka's bhedābheda, while remaining distinct from both through its emphasis on devotional union (puṣṭi) as the sole path to liberation. Vallabha formulated the philosophy of Śuddhādvaita, in response to Śaṅkara's Ādvaita Vedānta, which he called Maryādā Mārga or Path of Limitations. Vallabha asserted that religious disciplines focusing on Vedic sacrifices, temple rituals, puja, meditation, and yoga held limited value. Additionally, Vallabha rejected the concept of Māyā, stating that the world was a manifestation of the Supreme Absolute and could neither be tainted nor change. The school rejects the ascetic lifestyle and cherishes the householder lifestyle, wherein followers see themselves as participants and companions of Kr̥ṣṇa, viewing their daily lives as an ongoing raslila.

=== Brahman ===
According to Vallabha, Brahman consists of existence, consciousness, and bliss (sat-cit-ānanda), and when manifested completely, as Kr̥ṣṇa himself. The purpose of this tradition is to perform sevā (selfless service) out of love for Kr̥ṣṇa. According to Vallabha, through single minded religiosity, a devotee would achieve awareness that there is nothing in the world that is not Kr̥ṣṇa.

=== Puṣṭi ===
According to Vallabha there are three kinds of souls: puṣṭi, maryāda, and pravāha. The puṣṭi and maryāda souls are divine souls that have potential of upliftment or salvation. The puṣṭi ("complete" or "well-nourished") souls rely on Kr̥ṣṇa's grace as the sole effective means to achieve devotion, and other efforts are insignificant without God's grace.

Vallabha distinguishes between two aspects of devotion: the maryāda and the puṣṭi. Maryāda followers rely on their actions and God's judgment for spiritual rewards, aligning with scriptural injunctions. In contrast, Puṣṭi followers rely solely on God's grace, prioritizing complete devotion and surrender without personal effort, embodying unconditional love and faith towards God. Vallabha also emphasizes that the path of pusti is open to all, regardless of caste or gender. He cautions against seeing this path as too focused on pleasure, saying it is about pure, divine devotion without being attached to worldly desires.

=== Jagat ===
Vallabha viewed the world (jagat) as intricately linked to the belief that the world is an expression and manifestation of Brahman. He accepts the idea that Brahman manifested itself as both the individual souls (jivas) and the world. Vallabha argued that Brahman desired to become many to express His playful nature (lila) and hence created the world. Vallabha emphasizes that the world is not illusory but as real as Brahman itself, which manifests by temporarily suppressing its attributes of bliss and consciousness. When jivas, through ignorance, misunderstand or misinterpret the world as distinctly real and plural, they fall into the trap of samsara, which is unreal.

== Postage stamp ==
The Indian postal department of the Government of India issued a commemorative stamp bearing the image of Vallabhācārya on April 14, 1977.

== See also ==
- Bhagavata
- Vyasa
- Champaran (Chhattisgarh)
- Krishna
- Shrinathji
- Para Brahman
- Pushtimarg
- Ramanuja
- Madhvacharya
- Nimbarka
- Shuddhadvaita
- Brahma Sutras

== Sources ==
=== English ===
- Barz, Richard K. (1992) [1976]. The Bhakti Sect of Vallabhācārya. New Delhi: Munshiram Manoharlal.
- Barz, Richard (2018). "Vallabha". In Jacobsen, Knut A.; Basu, Helene; Malinar, Angelika; Narayanan, Vasudha (eds.). Brill's Encyclopedia of Hinduism Online. Brill.
- Entwistle, Alan W. (1987). Braj, Centre of Krishna Pilgrimage. Groningen: Egbert Forsten. doi:10.1163/9789004646599. ISBN 978-90-6980-016-5.
- Hawley, John Stratton (2013). "How Vallabhacharya Met Krishnadevaraya". In Verghese, Anila (ed.). Krishnadevaraya and His Times. Mumbai: K R Cama Oriental Institute.
- Hawley, John Stratton (2015). A Storm of Songs: India and the Idea of the Bhakti Movement. Harvard University Press. ISBN 978-0-674-18746-7.
- Marfatia, Mrudula I. (1967). The Philosophy of Vallabhācārya. Delhi: Munshiram Manharlal. ISBN 978-81-215-0406-5.
- Saha, Shandip (2004). Creating a Community of Grace: A History of the Pusti Marga in Northern and Western India (1493–1905) (Thesis). University of Ottawa.
- Shastri, Arunchandra D. (1961). Puruṣottamajī: A Study (PhD thesis). Maharaja Sayajirao University of Baroda. hdl:10603/59207.
- Smith, F.M. (2022). "Vallabhācārya". In Long, J.D.; Sherma, R.D.; Jain, P.; Khanna, M. (eds.). Hinduism and Tribal Religions. Encyclopedia of Indian Religions. Dordrecht: Springer. pp. 1698–1707. doi:10.1007/978-94-024-1188-1_813. ISBN 978-94-024-1187-4.

=== Gujarati ===
- Śāstrī, Keśavarāma Kāśīrāma (1977). Śrīvallabhācārya mahāprabhujī : aitihyamūlaka jīvanī. Śrī Sayājī Sāhityamāḷā (in Gujarati). Vaḍodarā: Prācyavidyā Mandira, Mahārājā Sayājīrāva Viśvavidyālaya.
