= Shodasha Grantha =

Hindu religious texts

Ṣoḍaśa Grantha, also spelled Shodasha Grantha (Sanskrit: षोडशग्रंथ, romanized: ṣoḍaśa-grantha, lit. 'Sixteen books'), is a collection of sixteen books (or doctrines) written by the Hindu philosopher Vallabha. They are the main doctrine of Pushtimarg, a sect of Vaishnavism in Hinduism. The works discuss the worship of the Hindu deity Krishna through service (seva) and contemplation (smāraṇa).

== Books ==
The sixteen books are:

1. Śrī-yamunāṣṭaka: "Eight stanzas to goddess Yamuna"
2. Bāla-bodha: A guide for beginners on the path of devotion
3. Siddhānta-muktāvalī: "Necklace of the Doctrine"
4. Puṣṭi-pravāha-maryada-bheda: The different characteristics of the different types of souls
5. Siddhānta-rahasya: "The secret of the Doctrine"
6. Navaratna: "Nine jewels of instructions"
7. Antaḥkaraṇa-prabodha: "Awakening of the heart"
8. Viveka-dhairyāśraya: "On discernment, steadfastness, and surrender to God"
9. Śrī-kṛṣṇāśraya: "Surrendering to Krishna"
10. Chatuḥślokī: "Four Verses"
11. Bhakti-vardhinī: "Growing devotion"
12. Jalabheda: Nineteen types of orators
13. Pañca-padyāni: Three types of listeners
14. Sannyāsa-nirṇāya: "Deciding on renunciation"
15. Nirodha-lakṣaṇā: Identifying characteristics of detachment
16. Seva-phala: "Reward of serving God"
