= Nandotsava =

Hindu observance

Nandotsava (Sanskrit: नन्दोत्सव, romanized: Nandotsava) is a Hindu festival celebrated on the ninth day of the waning moon during the Hindu month of Bhadrapada, occurring the day after the festival of Krishna Janmashtami. This corresponds to late August to early September in the Gregorian calendar. It honours Nanda, the foster-father of the deity Krishna. According to legend, following the deity's birth, his father, Vasudeva, carried the infant to the house of his cousin Nanda and Yashoda to the settlement of Gokulam, where he was raised.

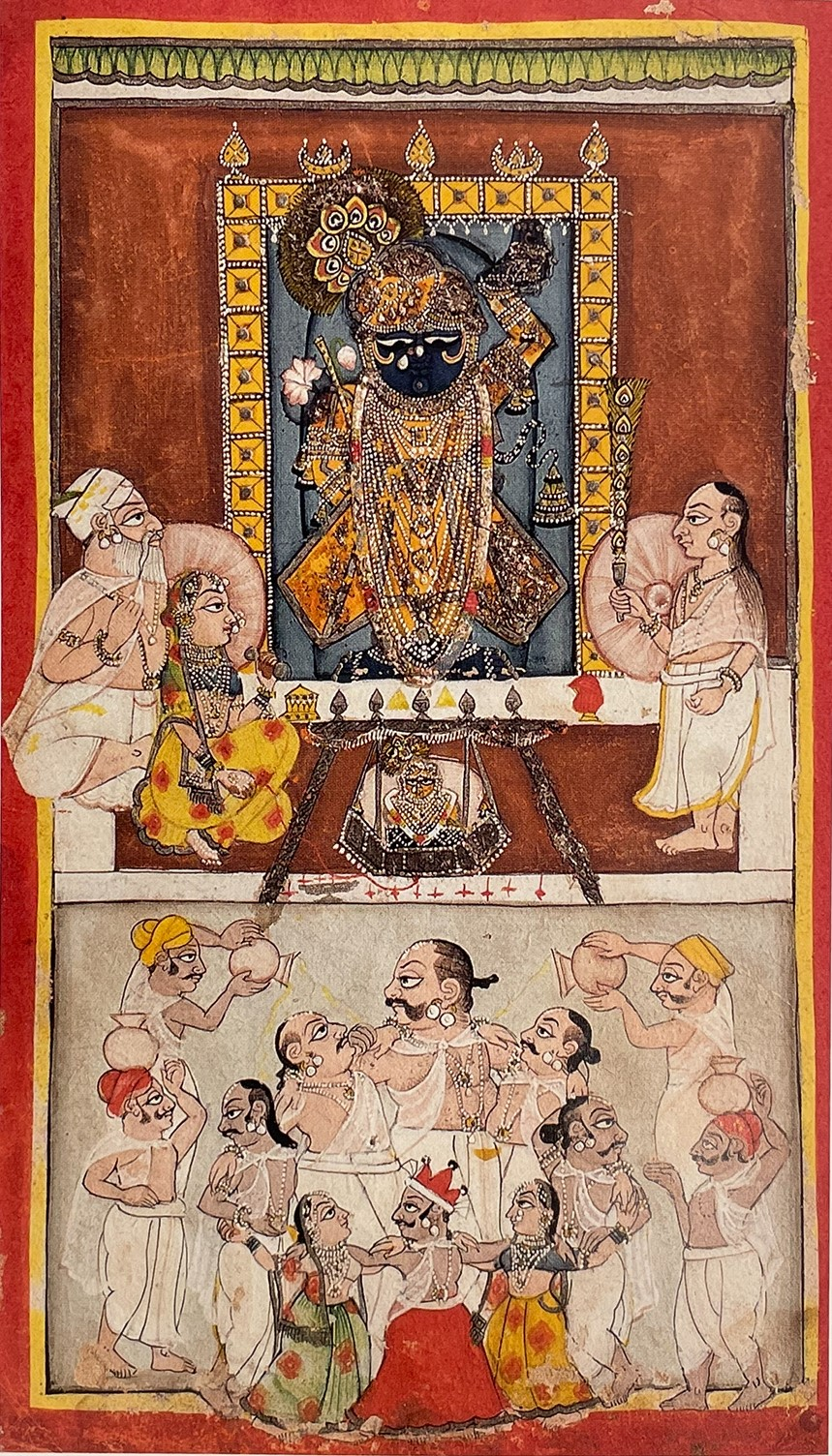
Nanda Mahotsava in Nathdwara (18th century)

== Literature ==
According to regional literature, Nanda is regarded to have organised festivities to celebrate the birth of Krishna. He is described to have invited the people of the region of Vraja to the occasion, including the village headsmen and the married and unmarried women of Vrindavan, notably the gopis. Drummers were invited to play music on the occasion and Brahmanas bathed the deity while chanting mantras. Yashoda is stated to have showered flowers upon the child while Rohini offered a feast to the guests.

== Religious practices ==
In Vrindavan, this festival is celebrated in various temples of Krishna.

The rituals of panchamrita abhisheka and arati are performed in honour of the deity. Some devotees form small groups and break pots of butter tied to ropes on high-rise buildings.

== Sources ==
- Packert, Cynthia. The Art of Loving Krishna: Ornamentation and Devotion. Indiana University Press, 2010. Print.
