= Gokulanatha =

Indian religious scholar (1551 - 1640 or 1647)

Gokulanātha
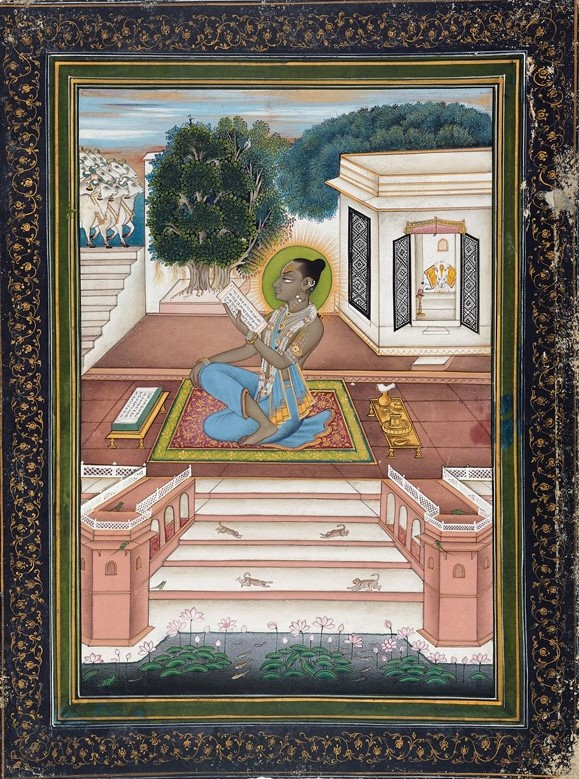
- Gokulanātha reading a manuscript (early 19th century)

Personal life
- Born: December 14, 1551 (Note: All Vikram Samvat life event dates in this article have been converted into the Gregorian calendar using https://www.harysdalvi.com/calcalc. Here the Gregorian date is given on conversion of the Indian calendar date given by Puṣṭi records.)
- Died: February 4, 1641 (aged 89)
- Spouse: Pārvatī (m. 1567)
- Children: Gopāla; Viṭṭhalarāya; Vrajaratana; 3 daughters
- Parents: Viṭṭhalanātha (father); Rukmiṇī (mother)
- Region: Indian philosophy

Religious life
- Religion: Hinduism
- Creed: Hindu philosophy, Shuddhadvaita, Pushtimarg, Vedanta

Gokulanātha (December 14, 1551 - February 4, 1641) was an Indian religious figure of the Puṣṭimārga sect of Vaishnavism. Gokulanātha was the fourth son of Viṭṭhalanātha, and was the founder of the fourth house of the Puṣṭimārga. He wrote several theological works in Sanskrit, and is considered the progenitor of the sampradāya's Vārta tradition in the vernacular Braj Bhasha language.

== Life ==
Gokulanātha was born on Mārgaśīrṣa suda 7, 1608 V.S. (December 14, 1551 CE) in the village of Adel, the fourth son of Viṭṭhalanātha, head of the Puṣṭimārga sampradāya. Viṭṭhalanātha's father Vallabha had founded the sampradāya. At the age of sixteen Gokulanātha married an eight-year-old girl named Pārvatī. Gokulanātha had six children, the last three of which were boys: Gopāla, Viṭṭhalarāya, and Vrajaratana, of which only Viṭṭhalarāya had any male issue. Viṭṭhalanātha, before his death, distributed seven deities or svarūpas of Kr̥ṣṇa amongst his sons, of which Gokulanātha received the deity Gokulanātha, which had previously been worshiped by the family of Vallabha's wife. After their father's death, Gokulanātha's eldest brother Giridhara ordered the splitting of the family's residences. Gokulanātha had to live separately, and took custody of his youngest brother Ghanaśyāma and nephew Kalyāṇarāya (son of Govindarāya). Gokulanātha once made a journey to Gujarat where he engaged in preaching and conversion at several sites.

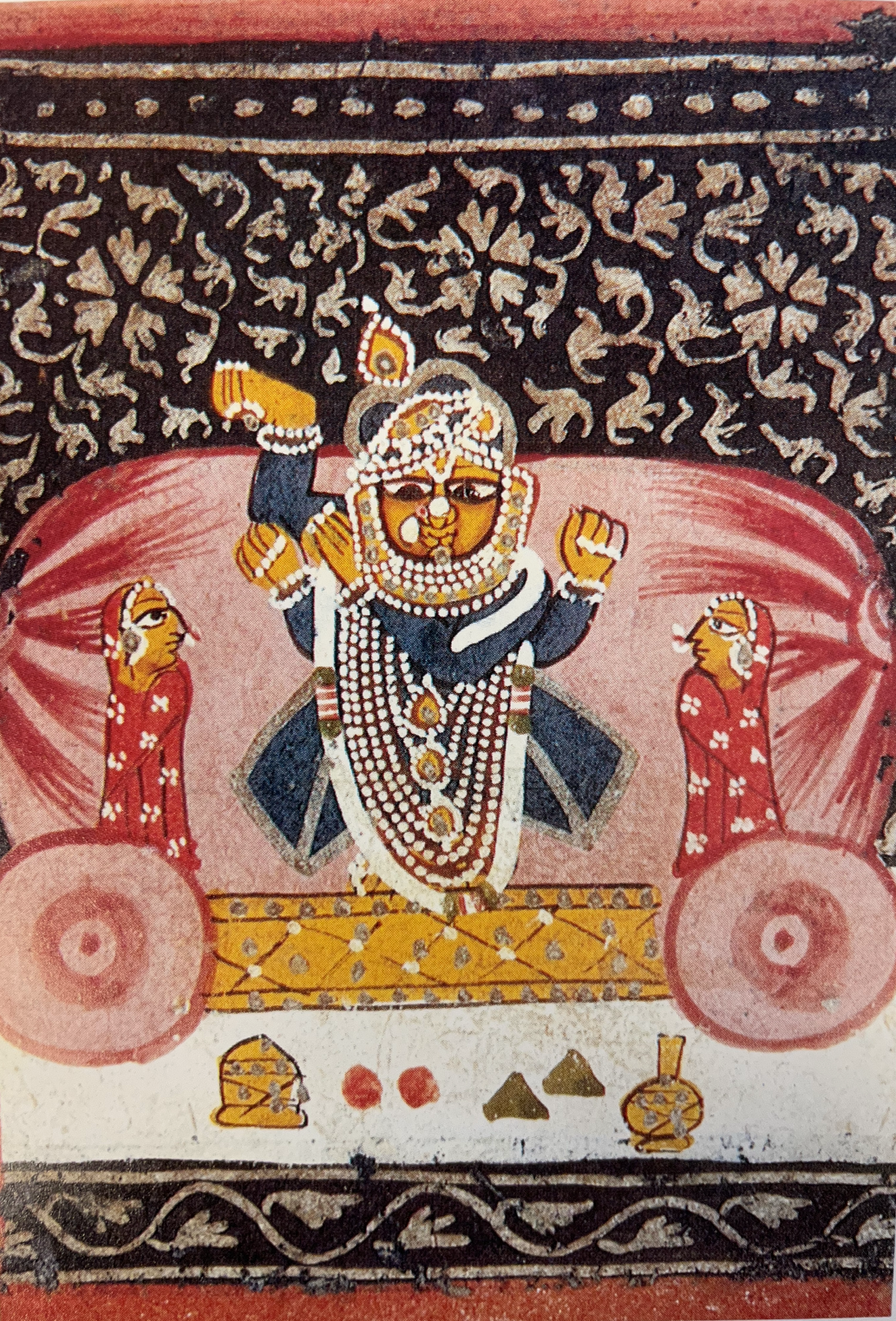
Mid 19th century painting of the svarūpa Gokulanātha flanked by Rādhā and Candrāvalī.

According to sectarian sources, Gokulanātha defended the right of members of the Puṣṭimārga to wear their sectarian tilakas and tulasī mālās from a Shaiva-Tantric ascetic named Jadrup or Cidrūpa who exerted great influence over the emperor Jahangir. This incident is considered to be of doubtful historicity by modern scholars.

Gokulanātha was also involved in the dispute between his nephews Dvārakeśa (son of Bālakr̥ṣṇa) and Madhusūdana (son of Yadunātha) over the deity Bālakr̥ṣṇa. Bālakr̥ṣṇa's service had been entrusted to Yadunātha by Viṭṭhalanātha, however the deity was jointly worshiped with Dvārakānātha by Yadunātha and his elder brother Bālakr̥ṣṇa. Yadunātha's son Madhūsūdana later wished to worship the deity separately, however Dvārakeśa refused to give Bālakr̥ṣṇa away. Gokulanātha acknowledged Madhusūdana's right to worship the deity separately, but within a year Madhūsūdana wanted to give Bālakr̥ṣṇa back to Dvārakeśa. Gokulanātha then had the cousins sign a contract resulting in Dvārakeśa's custody of Bālakr̥ṣṇa and Madhusūdana's of an alternate idol.

Gokulanātha initiated his grandnephew Harirāy (son of Kalyāṇarāya) into the Puṣṭimārga sect.

Puṣṭi records state that Gokulanātha died on Māgha vada 9, 1608 V.S. (February 4, 1641 CE) at the age of 89. Entwistle places his death in 1640 or 1647 CE.

== Literary works ==
=== Sanskrit ===
Gokulanātha wrote several works in Sanskrit, however lists of his work tend to be incomplete and incorrect. Among his original works include Tilakanirṇaya, Vijñāpti, and Śrīvallabhācārya Bhaktānāṁ Nāmāvalī, however his authorship of these works is doubted by modern historians. He also wrote commentaries on the works of Vallabha and Viṭṭhalanātha, mantras, and other subjects:

- Ṭīkā on Vallabha's Antaḥkaraṇaprabodha
- Bhāṣya on Vallabha's Bhaktivardhinī
- Bhāṣya on Vallabha's Nirodhalakṣaṇa
- Bhāṣya on Vallabha's Puṣṭipravāhamaryādā
- Bhāṣya on Vallabha's Saṃnyāsanirṇaya
- Bhāṣya on Vallabha's Sevāphala
- Bhāṣya on Vallabha's Siddhāntamuktāvalī
- Bhāṣya on Vallabha's Siddhāntarahasya
- Bhāṣya on Vallabha's Vivekadhairyāśraya
- Vivaraṇa on Viṭṭhalanātha's Vallabhāṣṭaka

=== Braj Bhasha ===
A series of discourses by Gokulanātha was recorded and compiled by his disciple Kalyāṇ Bhaṭṭ called Śrī Gokulnāthjī ke Caubīs Vacanāmr̥ta. This work details Gokulanātha's speeches which reemphasized Vallabha's teachings in terms of what it means to be a servant or Kr̥ṣṇa and how to perform proper service to him.

==== Vārtā Literature ====
All the prose vārtā literature in Braj Bhasha is generally attributed to Gokulanātha. The most important vārtās are the Caurāsī Vaiṣṇavana kī Vārtā ("Stories of the 84 Vaishavas") and Do Sau Bāvana Vaiṣṇavana kī Vārtā ("Stories of the 252 Vaishnavas), which depict the lives of the disciples of Vallabha and Viṭṭhalanātha, respectively. According to Entwistle, while it is possible some of the stories were composed by Gokulanātha, they were revised, expanded, and commented upon by Harirāy.

== Descendants and Disciples ==
=== Descendants ===
The haveli of the svarūpa Gokulanātha currently in is in Gokul, Uttar Pradesh. Gokulanātha is a small four-armed metal image. Two of Gokulanātha's arms play a flute, the third is held in the air, and the fourth holds a conch. The image is flanked by icons of Rādhā and Candrāvalī. The haveli is maintained by Gokulanātha's descendants, who form the fourth house of the Puṣṭimārga. During the reign of Aurangzeb the Vaishnav deities of Braj left the region, and Gokulanātha was eventually installed in Jaipur in the late 1700s, along with the deities Gokulacandramā and Madanamohana of the fifth and seventh houses of the Puṣṭimārga. At some point Gokulanātha was then taken back to Gokul.

=== Disciples ===
Gokulanātha's followers repeat the phrase "Jai Jai Gokuleś" and wear a different tilak than the other Six Houses. The disciples of Gokulanātha are split into two divisions, the Bharucīs and Nīmaḍīās, The Nīmaḍīās do not differ much from the other six houses and seek initiation from their gosvāmī's seat in Gokul. Unlike the other six houses, the Nīmaḍīā's temples are managed by the devotees themselves rather than the gosvāmī in Gokul. The Bharucīs differ vastly from the other six houses and the Nīmaḍīās, and consider Gokulanātha to be the supreme deity and Vallabha and Viṭṭhalanātha to be his incarnations. They do not attend any Puṣṭimārgīya temples, pay respect to gosvāmīs, worship Kr̥ṣṇa idols, or worship portraits of Gokulanātha. Their objects of worship are Gokulanātha's pādukās: i.e. items that have been touched by Gokulanātha, e.g. his garments, letters, or hair. Some also worship Yamunā in a pitcher.

==== Notable Disciples ====
Among his disciples include the poet Haridāsa Vaiṣṇava of Bharuch, who authored Virahagītā, Anubhavānanda, Bhaktasukhamaṁjarī, and some dhoḷas and kīrtanas.
