= Shuddhadvaita =

Philosophy propounded by Vallabhacharya

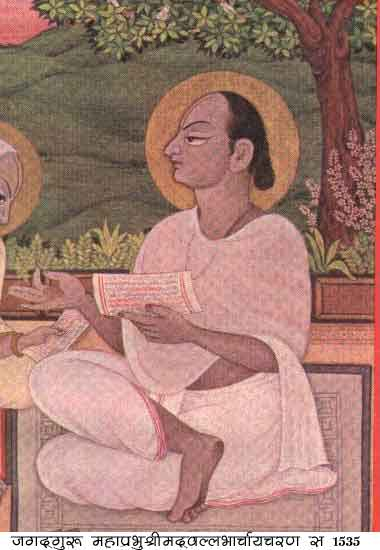
Vallabhacharya, who propounded the philosophy of Shuddadvaita

Shuddhadvaita (Sanskrit: शुद्धाद्वैत, IAST: śuddhādvaita, "pure non-dualism") is the "purely non-dual" philosophy propounded by the Hindu philosopher Vallabha (1479–1531 CE), the founder of Puṣṭimārga ("The path of grace"), a Vaishnava tradition focused on the worship of the deity Krishna.

The Shrinathji temple at Nathdwara, and compositions of eight poets (aṣṭasakha), including Surdas, are central to the worship by the followers of the sect.

== History ==
Shuddhadvaita, or "pure non-dualism", is a Vedantic philosophy. It identifies the original Absolute Truth as the personal Supreme Being, Krishna, who manifests the universe through his own nature for divine play (lila). The tradition recognizes Vallabhacharya as its primary philosopher. It also acknowledges an Acharyatrayi (three founding authorities) consisting of Vallabhacharya, his elder son Shri Gopinathji, and his younger son Shri Vitthalnathji (Gusainji), who further systematized the sect's liturgy. Vallabhacharya is known as the early founder of the Rudra sampradaya, one of the four main traditions of Vaishnavas. He revived it in the 15th century, composing a partial commentary on the Brahma Sutras (Anubhashya) and a full commentary on the Bhagavata Purana (Subodhini). After Vallabhacharya's death, his son Vitthalanatha completed the commentary on the Brahma Sutras.

Central to this path is the Brahmsambandh initiation. In this ritual, the devotee performs Atmanivedan (self-dedication), offering their body, mind, and wealth (tan-man-dhan) to Krishna. This is believed to remove the soul's fundamental ignorance and defects. A distinction in this theology was clarified following the Maharaj Libel Case (1862). The dedication is directed solely to the personal God. Vallabhacharya's descendants are regarded as a Gurudwaar (the gateway or instrument of the original teacher), not as the Absolute itself.

In the early 20th century, figures such as Mulchand Teliwala and Ranchhoddas Patwari led a scholarly revival. They published critical editions of the original Sanskrit commentaries. This work, according to the tradition, aimed to preserve the philosophy from versions presented during the colonial era that were considered distorted or misinterpreted. This scholarship contributed to the status of Shuddhadvaita as a Vedantic system of Sakara Brahmavada (the doctrine of Brahman with form).

Later scholarly work expanded the Shuddhadvaita philosophy. Purusottama (1668–1781), Vallabhacharya's seventh descendant, wrote commentaries on the Anubhashya (known as Prakasha), the Subodhini, and the Vidvan Mandana. His adopted son Gopesvara (1780–1830) further wrote a commentary on the Prakasha called Rashmi.

== Central topics ==
In the ancient Vedic tradition of knowledge and comprehension of reality, the central theme is considered to be experiencing the Supreme Entity or Brahman. The Vedas primarily contain references to the non-dual (advaita) nature of Brahman. However, depending on how a scholar perceives those verses, they might see duality—a dvaita aspect as well. This ambiguity has led to several philosophical traditions in the Indian history, such as:

- Advaita vāda of Adi Shankaracharya
- Vishistadvaita vāda of Ramanujacharya
- Dvaita vāda or Bhedavāda of Madhvacharya
- Dvaitadvaita vāda of Nimbarkacharya
- Shuddhadvaita vāda of Vallabhacharya
- Achintya Bheda Abheda vāda of Chaitanya Mahaprabhu

== Vallabhacharya ==
Vallabhacharya was a devotional philosopher who founded the Pushti sect in India. He earned the title of acharya by traveling and debating advaita scholars from a young age.

In 1493–94, Vallabhacharya is said to have identified an image of Krishna at the Govardhan hill at Braj. This image, now called Shrinathji and located at Nathdwara, Rajasthan, is central to the worship of Vallabha followers.

=== Initiating mantra ===
According to the Vallabha tradition, one night in 1494, Vallabhacharya received the Brahmasambandha mantra (the mantra that binds one with Brahman, or Krishna) from Krishna himself (hence the name mukhāvatāra) at Gokula. The eight-syllable mantra, śri kṛṣṇaḥ śaraṇaṃ mama (Lord Krishna is my refuge), is passed on to new initiates in the Vallabha sampradaya. It is believed that the divine name has the power to cleanse the recipient of all impurities of the soul (doṣas).

== Philosophy ==
=== Metaphysics ===
Vallabha's school of 'in-essence monism' or 'purified non-dualism' sees equality in "essence" of the individual self with God. There is no real difference between the two (like the analogy of sparks to fire). However, unlike Shankara's Advaita, Vallabha does not deny God as the whole and the individual as the part. According to Vallabha, the individual soul is not the Supreme (Satcitananda) clouded by the force of avidya, but is itself Brahman, with one attribute (ananda) rendered imperceptible. The soul is both a doer and enjoyer. It is atomic in size, but pervades the whole body through its essence of intelligence (just as sandalwood makes its presence felt through its scent even if it cannot be seen).

Unlike in Advaita, the world of maya is not regarded as unreal, since maya is nothing else than a power of Ishvara. Ishvara is not only the creator of the universe but is the universe itself. In support of this, Vallabha cites Chandogya Upanishad sections 6.1–6.4, that Brahman desired to become many and became the multitude of individual souls and the world. Although Brahman is considered unknowable, He is known when He manifests Himself through the world.

As is customary in Vaishnavism, bhakti is the means of salvation, though jnana (knowledge) is also useful. Karmas (understood as daily and occasional ritual acts) precede knowledge of the Supreme, and are present even when this knowledge is gained. The liberated perform all karmas. The highest goal is not mukti or liberation, but rather the eternal service of Krishna and participation along with His activities in His divine abode of Vrindavana. Vallabha distinguishes the transcendent consciousness of Brahman as Purushottama. Vallabha lays a great stress on a life of unqualified love and devotion towards God. Devotees are to serve God without any personal motives.

Philosophical traditions commonly describe how the Supreme Entity Brahman is related to humanity and the world. In Shuddhadvaita, otherwise known as Brahmavaad, the One, secondless Ultimate Reality is the only category. Every other thing has proceeded from it at the time of creation, is non-different from it during creation, and merges into it at the time of dissolution. The two other well known categories namely the animate souls and the inanimate objects are respectively its parts and modifications. The animate souls are its parts because they retain to some extent the essential qualities thereof namely consciousness and joy. The inanimate objects are its modification because the above said qualities are absent therein.

=== Moksha (liberation) ===
In Shuddhadvaita philosophy, the concept of moksha (liberation) is categorized based on a hierarchy of bliss and the qualification of the soul. In Advaita Vedanta, liberation is described as the merging into the impersonal Absolute (Brahmanand).

Shuddhadvaita texts, however, describe this as trivial (tuccha) compared to Bhagavat-prapti (attaining the personal Lord). In the Kali Yuga, it is believed that the forms of bhakti mentioned in the scriptures are nearly impossible to practice, so the followers of Vallabhacharya recommend pushti bhakti – which is the end itself and not a means to an end, giving moksha, joy, and oneness with Shree Krishna. Pushti bhakti asserts that oneness with Shree Krishna can be achieved merely by having true belief and love for Shree Krsna and recitation of the Brahmasambandha mantra.

Vallabhacharya established that liberation is only possible due to God's grace.

=== Everything is Krishna's Leela ===
According to the version of Vaishnava theology that Vallabhacharya espoused, Krishna in His "Satcitananda" form is the Absolute, Svayam Bhagavan. He is believed to be permanently playing out His sport (lila) from His seat in the Goloka, which is even beyond the divine Vaikuntha, the abode of Vishnu, Satya-loka, the abode of Brahma the Creator, and Kailas, the abode of Shiva. Creation is His sport.

=== Bhakti ===
A devotee is said to not be obsessed with liberation, but focused on offering service to Krishna and Radha. The highest form of devotion is considered that through which one gives up the body, heart and soul to the cause of God. It is considered to be the fullest expression of what is known as Atma-nivedana (= giving-up of oneself) among the nine forms of bhakti (Navadha Bhakti). It is the bhakti of the devotee who worships God not for any reward or presents but for His own sake. Such a devotee goes to Goloka after leaving this body and lives in eternal bliss enjoying the sports of the Lord. The classical example of this complete self-effacement is that of the cow-herdesses towards Krishna. They spoke no word except prayer and they moved no step except towards Krishna. Their supreme-most meditation was on the lotus-feet of Krishna.Thus it is by God's grace alone that one can obtain release from bondage and attain Krishna's heaven, Goloka.

=== Ashta-chhaap ===
In V.S. 1602 (1545 CE), Vallabhacharya's son Vitthalnath, also known as Gusainji, established the eight-fold system of singing the name and glory of Shrinathji (Kirtana). He entrusted this responsibility to eight poet-disciples of Vallabhacharya and his own. They are called the ashta-chhaap, or Eight Seals, after the eight divine services to Shrinathji from morning until he is put to sleep. Foremost among them was Surdas, the blind poet of Agra.

These are Surdas, Krishna Das, Paramanand Das, Kumbhan Das, Chaturbhuj Das, Nand Das, Chhitswami, and Govind Das. The first four poets and singers were Vallabhacharya's disciples, while the other four were Gusainji's.

== Shuddhadwait Martand ==
Shuddhadwait is defined more thoroughly in verse 27–28 from Shuddhadwait Martand:

शुद्धाद्वैतापदे ज्ञेय: समास: कर्मधारय: I

अद्वैतं शुद्धयो: प्राहुः षष्ठी तत्पुरुषं बुधा: II

मायासंबंधरहितमं शुद्धमित्युच्यते बुधै: I

कार्यकरणरूपमं हि शुद्धं ब्रह्म न मायिकम़् II

"It is Karmdharay samaas : Shuddham ch tat adwaitam (The Pure and its non-dualism). Or, it is the Shashti Tatpurush samaas Shuddhyoh adwaitam (The Non-dual is pure). In this system, the combination of Maya with Brahm is done away with; therefore the cause of this world is not Brahm covered by Maya. But the pure Brahm and only pure Brahm is the effect and cause of this world."

The Shuddhadvaita philosophy has also been explained by various scholars of the sect, such as Devarshi Ramanath Shastri, who has enunciated the tenets of this philosophy in his books Shuddhadvait Siddhantasaar (Hindi and Gujarati) and Shuddhadvaita Darshan.

== Traditions following Suddhadvaita ==
Vallabhacharya founded the Krishna-centered Pushti-Marga sect of Vaishnavism in the Braj(Vraj) region of India.

In modern times followers of Shuddadvaita are concentrated in the states of Rajasthan and Gujarat.

== Sources ==
- Beck, Guy L. (1993). Sonic theology: Hinduism and sacred sound. Columbia, S.C: University of South Carolina Press. ISBN 0-87249-855-7.
- Flood, Gavin (Ed) (2003), Blackwell companion to Hinduism, Blackwell Publishing, ISBN 0-631-21535-2
