= Vitthalanatha =

Indian philosopher (1515–1586)

Viṭṭhalanātha
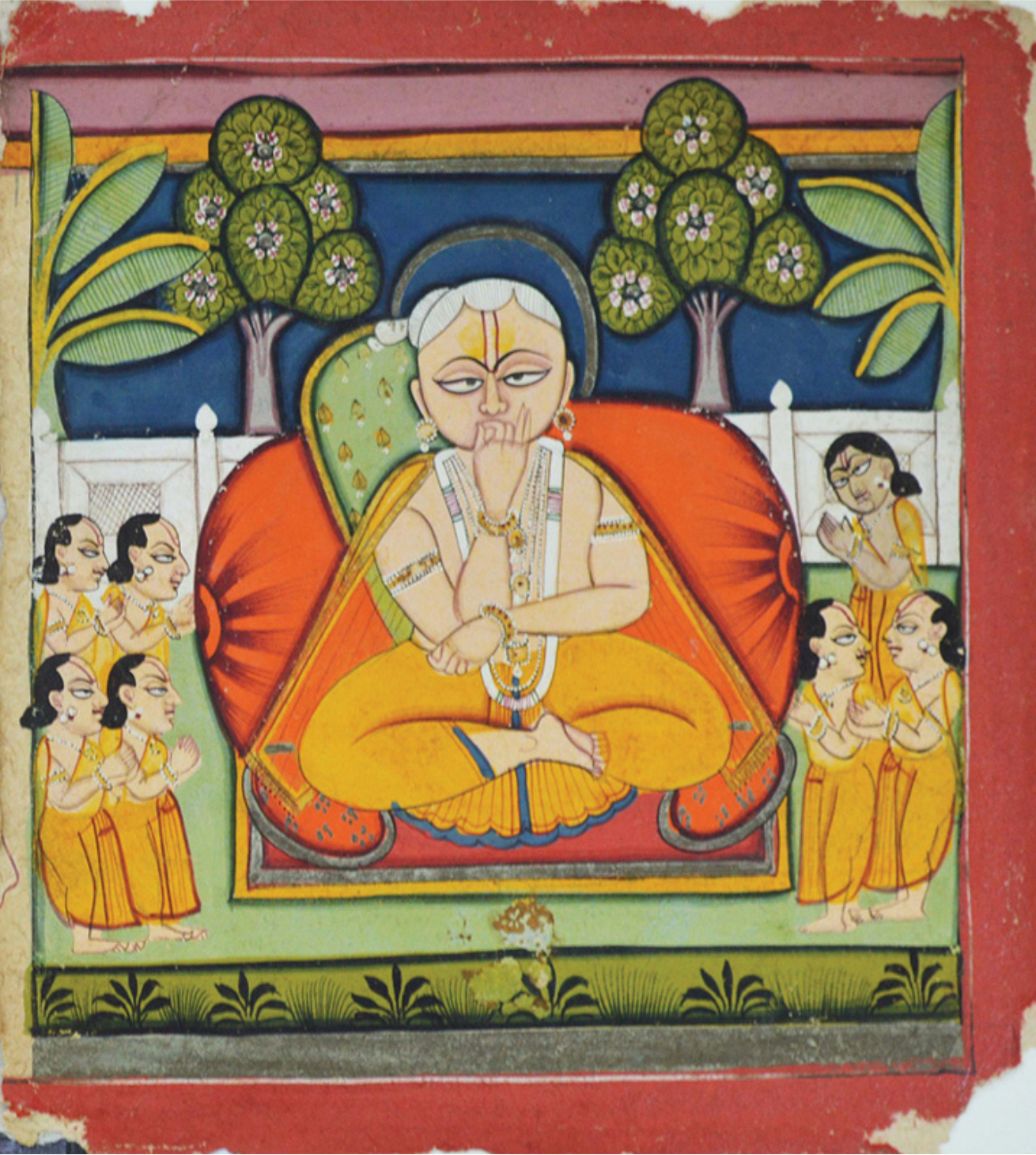
- Viṭṭhalanātha and his seven sons (c. 1750 CE)

Personal life
- Born: 10 December 1515 (Note: All Vikram Samvat life event dates in this article have been converted into the Gregorian calendar using https://www.harysdalvi.com/calcalc. Here the Gregorian date is given on conversion of the Indian calendar date given by Puṣṭi records.) Charanat near Varanasi, India
- Died: 10 February 1586 (aged 70)
- Spouse: Rukmiṇī (m. 1533) Padmāvatī (m. 1568)
- Children: Giridhara; Śobhā Beṭījī; Govindarāya; Kamalā Beṭijī; Devakā Beṭījī; Bālakr̥ṣṇa; Gokulanātha; Raghunātha; Yamunā Beṭījī; Yadunātha; Ghanaśyāma
- Parents: Vallabhācārya (father); Mahālakṣmī (mother)
- Era: Ancient philosophy
- Region: Indian philosophy

Religious life
- Religion: Hinduism
- Creed: Hindu philosophy, Shuddhadvaita, Pushtimarg, Vedanta

Viṭṭhalanātha (Devanagari: विट्ठलनाथ, IAST: Viṭṭhalanātha; 10 December 1515 – 10 February 1586), popularly known as Gusaijī, was an Indian philosopher. He was the younger son of Vallabha, who founded the Puṣṭimārga Sampradāya of Hinduism.

== Names ==
Apart from Viṭṭhalanātha, his other names include Viṭṭhaleśvara, Viṭṭhala Dīkṣita, or Agnikumāra. In addition, he is known by the title Gosvami (Gosai-ji or Gusai-ji).

== Early life ==
Puṣṭimārga records state that Viṭṭhalanātha was born on Mārgaśīrṣa vada 9, 1572 V.S. (December 10, 1515 CE), as the second son of the religious scholar Vallabha. However, some scholars place his birth around 1516 CE or between 1515 and 1518.

His devotees consider him an incarnation of the god Vithoba (Vitthal) of Pandharpur. He was brought up by Vallabha until the age of 15, and subsequently, by Vallabha's disciple Dāmodara-dāsa.

He studied Nyāya at Navadvipa and was proficient in the Vedas, the Brahma Sūtras, and the Mīmāṃsā philosophy.

== Religious activities ==
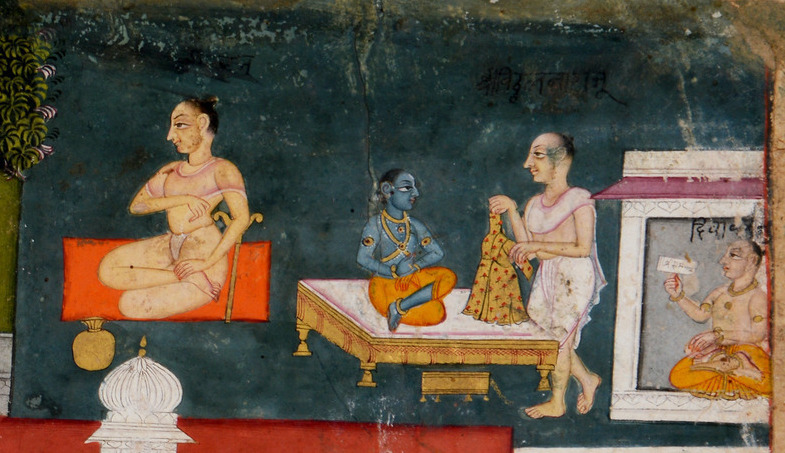
Śrīviṭṭhalanātha Jū, the son of Vallabhācarya, the founder of the Puśṭimārg, Bhaktamal illustration, Bundelkhand, circa late 18th century

In 1540, the Gauḍiyas (Bengalis) were expelled from the Śrī Nāthajī temple by followers of the Puṣṭimārga. As consolation, Viṭṭhalanātha gave them the image of Madanmohan, which they took to Vrindavan. To replace them, Viṭṭhalanātha hired Sanchora Brahmins from Gujarat to perform the worship of Śrī Nāthajī.

After the death of his father Vallabha (c. 1530), Viṭṭhalanātha's elder brother Gopinātha became the leader of the sect. However, when Gopinātha died in 1542 with his son Puruṣottama still a minor, Viṭṭhalanātha emerged as the main leader of the religious sect established by his father. Six years later, he faced a challenge by Puruṣottama and his family, who were backed by Kr̥ṣṇadāsa Adhikāri, the first temple manager of the Śrī Nāthajī Temple.

Kr̥ṣṇadāsa often had controversial relationships with women; he once allowed a wealthy kṣatriya woman named Gaṅgābāī Kṣatrānī to be present during the private offerings of food to Śrī Nāthajī. This was ritually prohibited, and Viṭṭhalanātha banned the woman from the temple premises. However, in retaliation, Kr̥ṣṇadās had Viṭṭhalanātha banned from the temple for six months. Rāmdās Cauhān was a supporter of Viṭṭhalanātha, and daily brought him caraṇāmr̥ta, garlands, and messages for Śrī Nāthajī. Viṭṭhalanātha's eldest son, Giridhara, then petitioned the local Mughal authorities (specifically identified as Bīrbal), who had Kr̥ṣṇadāsa arrested. However, Viṭṭhalanātha demanded that Kr̥ṣṇadāsa be released, and the two reconciled, with Viṭṭhalanātha reinstated as head of the sect and Kr̥ṣṇadāsa as temple manager. Puruṣottama would later die at a young age. This account is found in the vārta of Kr̥ṣṇadāsa; however, it is unlikely that Bīrbal himself took part in these events, which likely took place c. 1548–1549.

From 1543 through 1581, Viṭṭhalanātha went on six fundraising tours that focused primarily on Gujarat, visiting the cities of Dvarka, Surat, Khambat, Ahmedabad, and Godhra. He was successful in converting large portions of Gujarati merchants (Lohanas, Bhatias, Banias), agriculturalists (Kanbis), and artisans. When visiting Ahmedabad he used to stay in the house of Bhāīlā Koṭhārī in Asārvā. The house now contains Viṭṭhalanātha's baiṭhak. Bhāīlā Koṭhārī's son-in-law Gopāḷdās (also a devotee of Viṭṭhalanātha) composed the Vallabhākhyān by 1577, which praises the family of Vallabha, and was one of the earliest to establish the divinity of Vallabha, Viṭṭhalanātha, and their descendants.

Viṭṭhalanātha was successful in securing royal and political patronage, such as with Rāṇī Durgāvatī, who arranged his second marriage and gifted him land and the Sātgharā mansion in Mathura. According to sectarian sources he also initiated Āsakarana, the ruler of Narwar.

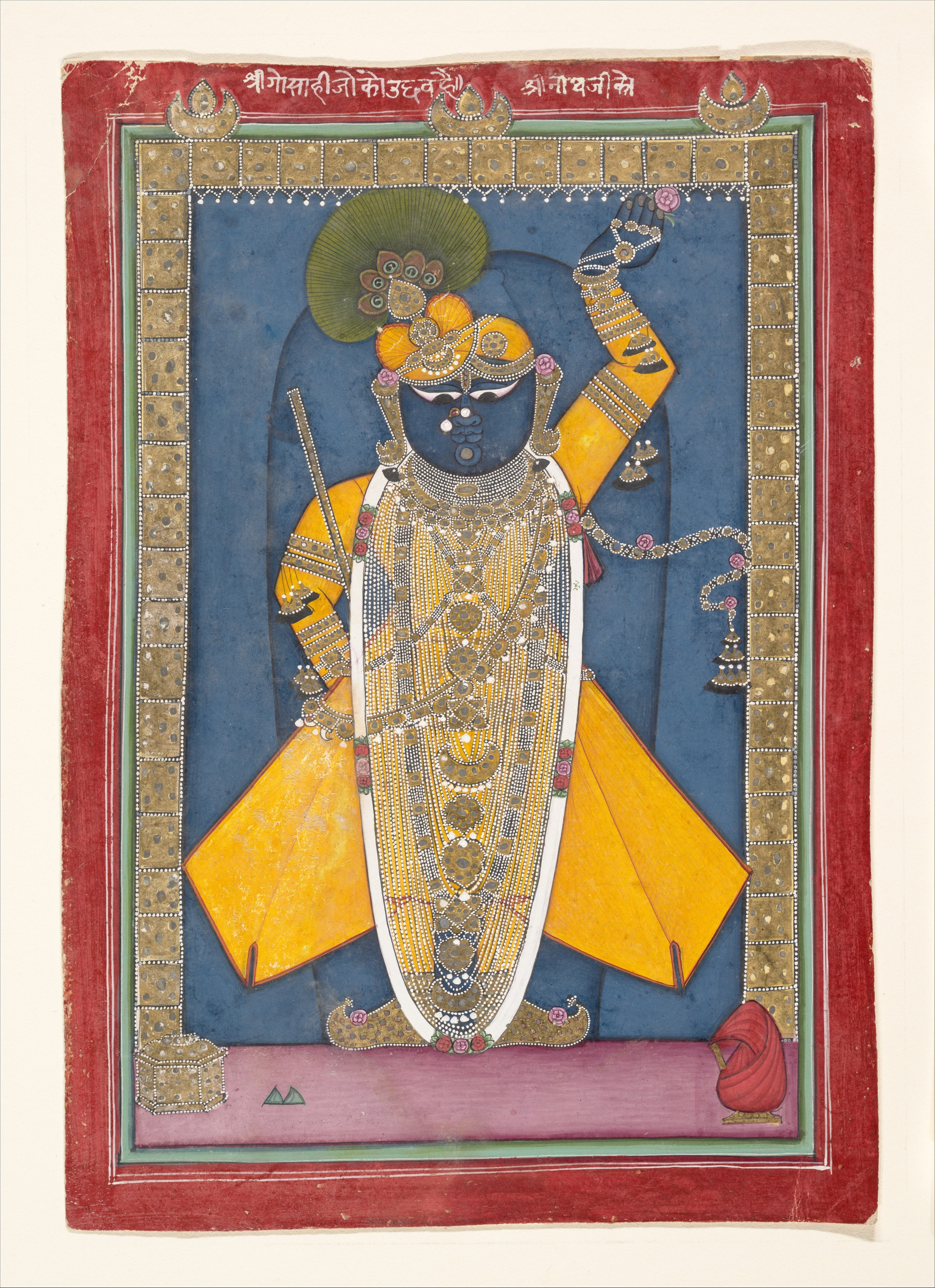
Śrīnāthajī wearing attire similar to those Viṭṭhalanātha wore on his birthday when he met Akbar.

After moving to Gokul, he also secured Mughal patronage. In 1577, a grant was issued in the name of the emperor Akbar that Viṭṭhalnātha and his family would be exempt from tax and that his land in Gokul would be protected by the state. In 1581, a grant was issued that allowed Puṣṭi Mārga cows to roam freely through Gokul, including on state property and Mughal nobles' estates. In 1581, another grant was issued in the name of Hamida Begum that Puṣṭi Mārga cows could roam freely throughout the entirety of Braj. In 1588, Bahadur Khan issued a grant affirming the same right, as well as detailing that the cows could not be harassed by Mughal officials for herding or tax purposes. In return for the imperial Mughal patronage, the Puṣṭi Mārga was required to pray for the continual welfare of the Mughal Empire. According to sectarian literature, Viṭṭhalanātha met Akbar in Braj, initiated Akbar's wife Taj Bibi, and was gifted a diamond, which was then embedded into the chin of Śrī Nathajī. These two claims are unattested outside of sectarian literature, which seek to show Viṭṭhalanātha's spiritual authority as greater than the worldly power of Akbar. In 1593, he was granted a firmān confirming his purchase of tax-free land in Jatipura, where he built gardens, workshops, cowsheds, and buildings for the worship of Śrī Nāthajī. The same year another grant was issued stating his lands in Gokul and Guzar Ghat were tax-exempt in perpetuity. However, according to Saha these grants were issued to Viṭṭhalanātha's grandson Viṭṭhalarāya.

Vitthalanatha propagated the teachings of his father and established a religious centre at Gokul.

Viṭṭhalanātha lived at his father's house in Adail, and later moved to Braj during the reign of Akbar and lived in Sātgharā.

Viṭṭhalanātha expanded the rituals of the Puṣṭi Mārga by transforming the simple rituals of his father's time into a complex, aesthetically pleasing ritual experience. During his time, he reformed the sevā rituals to recreate the daily routine of Kr̥ṣṇa, in which he was offered expensive clothing, jewelry, perfumes, and sumptuous meals. Painting and poetry were also added to rituals to enhance their appeal.

After a long life of service to his sect, he died on Mahā vada 7, 1642 V.S. (10 February 1586). One sectarian source for his death, Saṃpradāya Kalpadruma, gives the date of Phālguna suda 11, 1644 V.S., differing from tradition. However, since his descendants celebrate his anniversary on Mahā vada 7, it is more widely accepted that the 1642 V.S. date is correct.

== Family ==
Most traditional and academic accounts state that Viṭṭhalanātha had eleven children. He had six sons and 4 daughters from his first wife Rukmiṇī, and one son from his second wife Padmāvatī. However, some hagiographies do go as far as to claim that he had 9 sons and 9 daughters from his first wife. He distributed nine major svarūpas of Kr̥ṣṇa that were worshipped by the Puṣṭimārga among his seven sons. Each son founded a lineage that served as leaders of the sampradays. The sons of Viṭṭhalanātha, their svarūpas, and his daughters are listed below:

- By Rukmiṇī Bahujī m.1589 V.S.):
1. Giridharajī, whose descendants serve Śrī Nāthajī, Navanītapriyājī, Mathuresájī, Śrī Dvārakādiśajī and Śrī Śrī Lālajī Prabhu.
2. Śobhā Beṭījī
3. Govindarāyajī, whose descendants serve Viṭṭhalanātha and Ćatūrbhuja Madanamohanajī
4. Kamalā Beṭijī
5. Devakā Beṭījī
6. Bālakr̥ṣṇajī, who descendants serve Dvārakānātha
7. Gokulanātha, whose descendants serve the deity Gokulanāthajī
8. Raghunāthajī, whose descendants serve Gokulacandramājī
9. Yamunā Beṭījī
10. Yadunāthajī, whose descendants serve Kalyānarayaji, Bālakr̥ṣṇajī and Mukundarāyajī
- By Padmāvatī Bahujī (m. 1624 V.S.):
1. Ghanaśyāmajī, whose descendants serve Madanamohanaji

Viṭṭhalanātha also had an adopted son named Tulasīdāsa. Tulasīdāsa or Tulasīrāma was a Sārasvata brahmin from Sindh whose father had been appointed to fetch water from the Yamuna for Śrī Nāthajī's service. However, Tulasīdāsa's parents died when he was young, and so he was raised in Viṭṭhalanātha's household and became known as Lālajī. Later in life Viṭṭhalanātha bestowed the deity Gopīnāthajī to him and told him to go to Sindh and convert the people there.

== Literary works ==
The texts and commentaries attributed to Viṭṭhalanātha include:

- Adhikaraṇasaṃgraha
- Aṇubhāṣya (continuation from 1.21)
- Ārya
- Āvirbhāvatirobhāvavimanā/Āvirbhāvatirobhāvavarṇanā
- Bhaktihaṃsa
- Bhaktihetunirṇaya
- Bhāṣya on Vallabha's Siddhāntarahasya
- Gītagovinda-prathamaṣṭapadī (vivṛtti)
- Hetunirṇaya (vivaraṇa on the Bhagavadgītā)
- Janmāṣṭamīnirṇaya
- Kṛṣṇapremāmṛta
- Nyāyadeśavivaraṇabodha (vivaraṇa on Vallabha's Nyāsadeśa)
- Prabhañjana
- Prabodhavivaraṇa
- Prameyapradīpa
- Premāmṛta (bhāṣya)
- Samayapradīpa
- Saptasloki
- Sarvottamasūtra
- Svatantralekhana
- Tāratamyastava
- Tātparya (vivaraṇa on the Bhagavadgītā)
- Vallabhāṣṭaka
- Vidvanmaṇḍana
- Vidyāmaṇḍana
- Viṭṭhalāṣṭaka
- Vivaraṇa on Vallabha's Madhurāṣṭaka
- Vivaraṇa on Vallabha's Parivṛdhāṣṭaka
- Vivaraṇa on Vallabha's Puṣṭipravāhamaryādā
- Vivaraṇa on Vallabha's Saṃnyāsanirṇaya
- Vivṛti on Vallabha's Navaratna
- Vivṛti on Vallabha's Siddhāntamuktāvalī
- Vivṛti on Vallabha's Yāmunāṣṭaka
- Śikṣāpātra
- Śṛṇgārarasamaṇḍanam
- Ṭippaṇī on Vallabha's Subodhinī
- Ṭīkā on Vallabha's Jalabheda
- Ṭīkā on Vallabha's Vivekadhairyāśraya

=== Vallabhāṣṭaka ===
In eight stanzas, Viṭṭhalanātha eulogies Vallabha as the Divine Fire and essentially Kr̥ṣṇa himself.

== Sources ==
- Barz, Richard (1992) [First edition 1976]. The Bhakti Sect of Vallabhācārya (3rd ed.). Munshiram Manoharlal.
- B. K. Bhatt (1980). Vallabhacharya. Abul Kalam Azad Oriental Research Institute. OCLC 567834413.
- Roshen Dalal (2014). Hinduism: An Alphabetical Guide. Penguin Books. ISBN 978-81-8475-277-9.
- G. V. Devasthali, ed. (1977). Śr̥ṅgāra-rasa-maṇḍanam. Bhandarkar Oriental Research Institute. OCLC 644448135.
- Entwistle, A.W. (1987). Braj: Center of Krishna Pilgrimage. Egbert Forsten Groningen.
- Saha, Shandip (2004). Creating a Community of Grace: A History of the Puṣṭi Mārga in Northern and Western India (1493-1905) (PhD thesis). University of Ottawa.
