= Alan Entwistle =

English academic

Alan Entwistle (March 10, 1949 – March 28, 1996) was a scholar of the Hindi language. He was a professor at the University of Washington.

== Early life and education ==
Entwistle was born on March 10, 1949, in Weymouth, England. He completed his undergraduate education with an honors Bachelor of Arts in French language at the University of Southampton in 1971. He then moved on to the School of Oriental and African Studies at the University of London, completing a Master of Arts in South Asia Area Studies in 1975. In 1982 he completed his PhD in Hindi, writing a dissertation The Rasa mana ke pada of Kevalarama, a medieval Hindi text of the Eighth Gaddi of the Vallabha Sampradaya. He was supervised by Professor J. C. Wright, Dr. R. D. Gupta and Dr. R. S. McGregor.

== Career ==
From 1980 to 1985, Entwistle held the post of Universitair Docent at the University of Groningen in the Netherlands where he taught Hindi and courses on Indian civilization, iconography, religion and literature. He joined the faculty of the Department of Asian Languages and Literature at the University of Washington in Seattle in 1986. He was promoted to associate professor with tenure in September, 1990. Entwistle gained a reputation as an effective and dedicated teacher of Hindi language and literature, as well as lecturing on courses about Indian devotional literature, Hinduism, iconography, and a postgraduate seminar on Religion in Comparative Perspective. Aside from his work within his department, Entwistle also worked within Washington's South Asia and Comparative Religion programs in the Jackson School of International Studies.

Entwistle's scholarly works on the study of India and Indian religions were marked by close attention to both philological linguistic issues of translation of texts and a broad emphasis upon the context of the material. Entwistle's research was dependent on a thorough linguistic and literary training which formed the bedrock of his close attention to both philological issues of text and cultural context. In 1981, along with H. T. Bakker, he coedited Vaisnavism: The history of the Krishna and Rama cults and their Contribution to Indian pilgrimage, authoring chapters on the history of Vaishnavism as well as an appendix "Notes on the Hindu Calendar and Vaisnava Festivals." In 1983 he published The Rasa mana ke pada of Kevalarama: a medieval Hindi text of the Eighth Gaddi of the Vallabha sect and Devi: the worship of the goddess and its contribution to Indian pilgrimage, which incorporated his essay Varieties of Devi.

In 1987, Entwistle published a multidimensional study of medieval Indian cultural history entitled Braj: Centre of Krishna Pilgrimage. Jack Hawley opined that:

It earns him a place in The Great Annals, wherever they are kept. It's not just the scope of the work, which is wonderful, but the trustworthiness of all of it-those dense footnotes, which serve as the best meeting place for scholarship and thought about Braj over the course of the last 50 years, perhaps 100. It is a remarkable thing to have accomplished-and it is made the more remarkable by the way in which he has accomplished it: not self-effacingly, surely, but with a smile and quietly and without calling particular attention to the magnitude of what he was doing.

In 1994, Entwistle coedited the Studies in South Asian Devotional Literature: Research Papers 1988-91.

== Later life ==
In 1986, Entwistle was diagnosed with a terminal brain tumor. He underwent severe radiation and chemotherapy and experienced a remission that allowed him to engage in almost ten further years of research and teaching. In late 1995, he took up a Senior Fellowship of the American Institute of Indian Studies during a long postponed study leave in India, but showed symptoms that the remission had ended. His deteriorating health forced him to return to Seattle in January 1996. He died on March 28, 1996.

At the time of his final illness, he was working on a piece in Readings in Medieval Rajasthani (Dingal) for the SOAS South Asian Texts series and a critical edition and translation of Acaldas Khici ri vacanika (The Tale of Acaldas Khici), a 15th-century historical ballad from Rajasthan.

Entwistle was survived by his sister Janice Mary Entwistle. 1942-2013.

== Books by ==
The Rasa mana ke pada of Kevalarama (1982)

Braj: Centre of Krishna Pilgrimage (1987)

Studies in South Asian Devotional Literature: Research Papers, 1988-1991, 599 pages, (1994)

Studies In Culture, Linguistics & Speechology: Essays On Culture, Language, Literature, Linguistics, Speechology, And Several Aspects Of Human Thinking
