= Gokul =

- Town
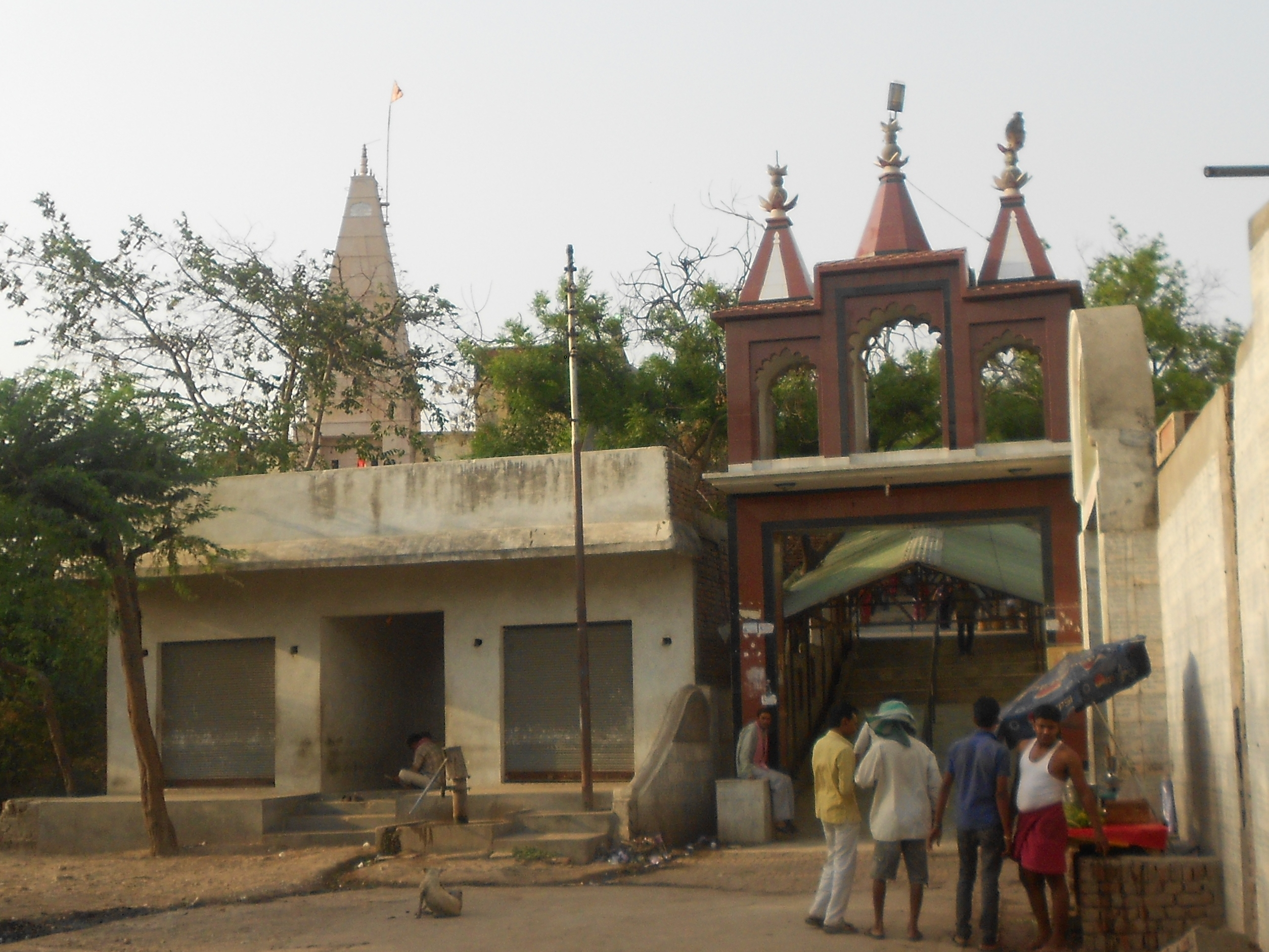
- A temple in Gokul

- Location in Uttar Pradesh, India
- Coordinates: 27.45°N 77.72°E
- Country: India
- State: Uttar Pradesh
- District: Mathura
- Elevation: 163 m (535 ft)

Population (2001)
  - Total: 4,041
- Demonym: Gokul wasi

Languages
  - Official: Hindi
  - Native: Braj Bhasha dialect
- Time zone: UTC+5:30 (IST)
- Vehicle registration: UP-85

Gokul is a town in the Mathura district of the Indian state of Uttar Pradesh. It is located 15 kilometres (9.3 mi) south-east of Mathura.

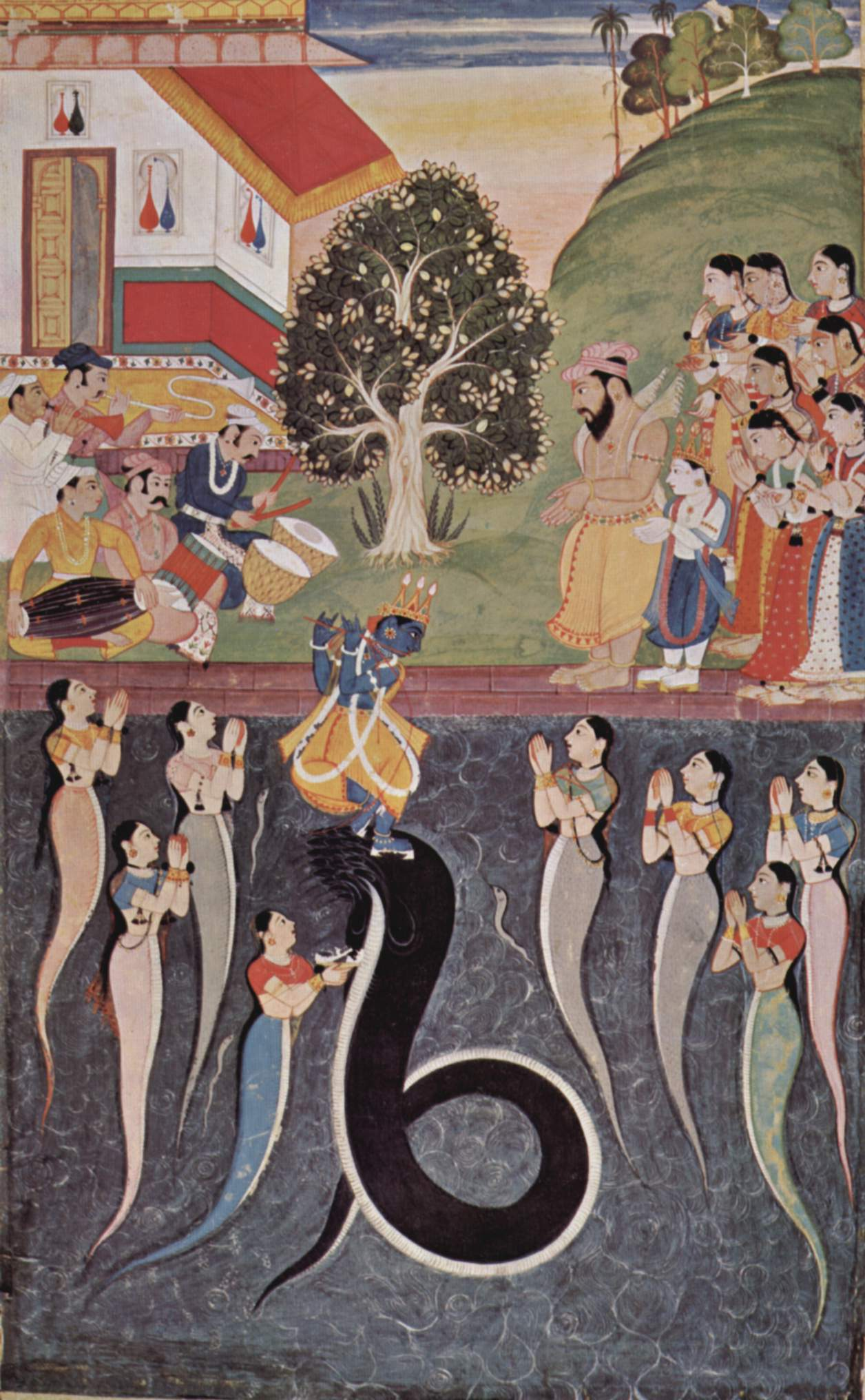
Krishna dances over the subdued Kaliya Naag in river Yamuna, while seen on the banks are people of Gokula, Krishna's father Nanda Baba and his brother Balarama

== History ==
In the Viṣṇu Purāṇa and Bhāgavata Purāṇa, the term "gokula" does not refer to any specific location, but rather simply a "cattle herd" or a temporary cowherd camp. According to the Bhāgavata Purāṇa, Gokula is where Kr̥ṣṇa performed most of his childhood līlā.

In pre-sixteenth century texts Mahāban and Gokul are identical, but starting in the late sixteenth century the two places became distinct. According to the vārtas of the Pushtimarg, in 1550 Vallabha arrived in Braj and unsuccessfully searched for Gokul and Mahāban, which were at the time considered lost/disappeared locations. There the goddess Jamna appeared before Vallabha and pointed out to him the lost site of Gokula next to a Chomkar/Shami tree.

Vallabha's son Viṭṭhalanātha set up his residence in Gokul, and expanded the town and established it as a religious center. He received imperial firmans in the name of Akbar that made Viṭṭhalanātha's landholdings in Gokul tax-exempt with state protection, and granted his cows the freedom to roam through state property and nobles' estates. Gokul was formerly the home of Navanitpriya and the seven Pushtimarg svarups.

== Transportation ==
Gokul is conveniently located ten kilometers from Mathura, a known Hindu pilgrimage site. The pilgrimage site is well connected to every significant Indian city by air, train, and road.

=== Road ===
Gokul has excellent road connections. Numerous buses are run by the Uttar Pradesh State Road Transport Corporation to and from Mathura and Gokul. Additionally, the town has a decent network of state and federal highways that pass close to Gokul, including the Yamuna Expressway and Taj Expressway.

=== Rail ===
Mathura, which is 7 km from the town, has the closest railway station. From the train station, you can reserve a cab to take you to Gokul. Other Indian cities including Delhi, Lucknow, and Mumbai are easily accessible from the Mathura railhead.

=== Air ===
Agra, which is 54 kilometers away from Gokul, has the closest airport. To go to Gokul from the Agra airport, you can arrange a taxi. With fewer flights, the air connection of the Agra airport is not the finest. As an alternative, you can travel 232 kms from the airport in Jaipur or 186 km from the Indira Gandhi International Airport in Delhi to get here. To get to Gokul from either airport, you can reserve a cab.

== Demographics ==
According to the 2001 census of India, Gokul had a population of 4041. Males constituted 55% of the population and females 45%. The average literacy rate was 60%, higher than the national average of 59.5%: male literacy was 68%, and female literacy was 49%. 18% of the population was under 8 years of age.

== Notable sites ==
=== Govind ghat aka Thakurani ghat ===
Govind Ghat is the main ghat of Gokul and is the baiṭhak where Vallabha initiated his first disciple.

=== Gokulanātha Haveli ===
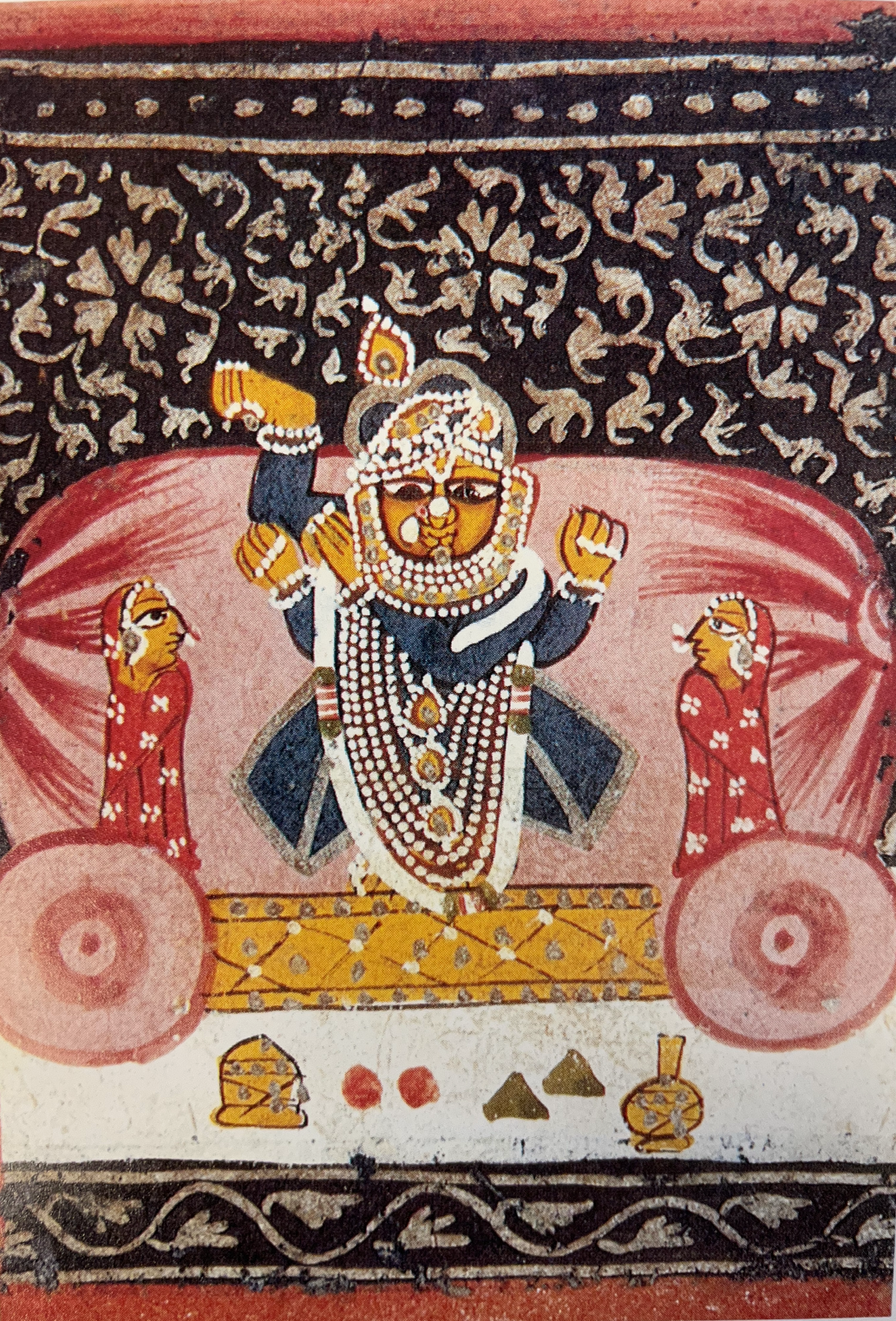
Mid 19th century painting of the svarūpa Gokulanātha flanked by Rādhā and Candrāvalī.

The haveli of the svarūpa Gokulanātha is in Gokul. The haveli is maintained by the fourth house of the Puṣṭimārga (the descendants of Gokulanātha, son of Viṭṭhalanātha). The deity Gokulanātha was originally worshipped by the family of Vallabha's wife, and was bestowed upon Gokulanātha by Viṭṭhalanātha. During the reign of Aurangzeb the Vaishnav deities of Braj left, and Gokulanātha was eventually installed in Jaipur in the late 1700s, along with the deities Gokulacandramā and Madanamohana of the fifth and seventh houses of the Pushtimarg. At some point Gokulanātha was then taken back to Gokul.
