= Pichhwai =

Hindu painted pictures portraying Krishna

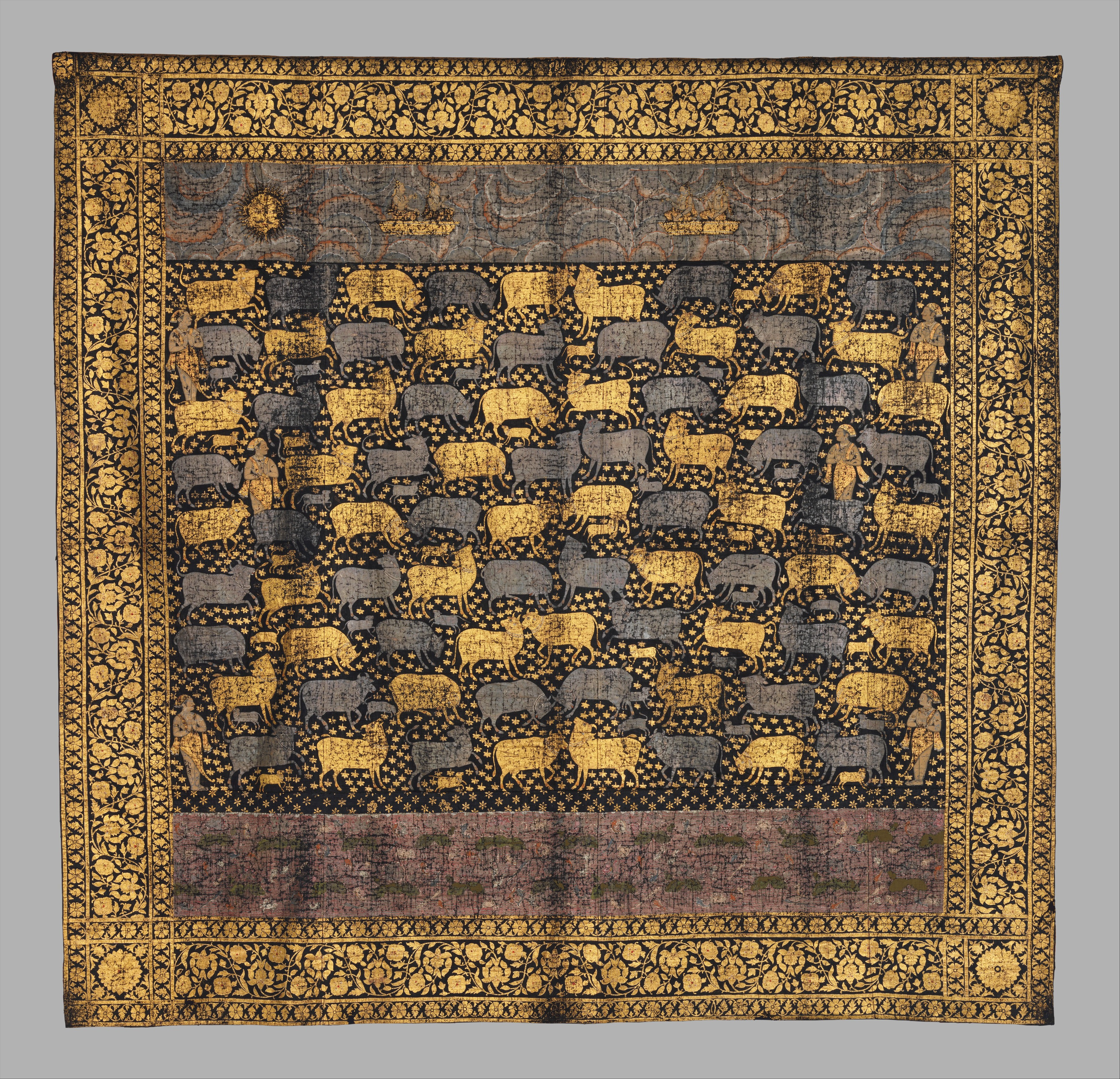
Pichhwai for the Festival of Cows, late 18th century, Aurangabad(?), painted and printed gold and silver leaf and opaque watercolor on indigo-dyed cotton, 97 5/8 x 103 1/8 inches (248 x 262 cm)

Pichhwai (also pichwai, pichhavai, pichhvai, pechhavai etc), literally meaning 'that which hangs from the back' from the Sanskrit words "Pichh" means back and "wais" means hanging, are large devotional Hindu painted pictures, normally on cloth, which portray Krishna. They are mainly made to hang in Hindu temples of the Pushtimarg devotional tradition, especially the Shrinathji Temple in Nathdwara, Rajasthan, built around 1672. They are hung behind the idol of Shrinathji, a local form of Krishna and the centre of Pushtimarg worship, to depict his leelas. Aurangabad was another area associated with them. The purpose of pichhwais, other than artistic appeal, is to narrate tales of Krishna to the illiterate. Temples have sets with different images, which are changed according to the calendar of festivals celebrating the deity.

Nathdwara painting covers these and similar works in other genres, especially Indian miniature paintings. Like the Pushtimarg tradition, they originated in the Deccan, but are now mainly associated with Western India.

== Style of Painting ==
=== Iconography ===
The main image portrayed in Pichhwai paintings is Shrinathji. This 700+ years old form of Krishna, is the presiding deity worshipped at the Shrinathji Temple with many paintings showing the rituals and worship offered to the deity in the temple. Modern pichhwais may also portray other forms of Krishna worshipped in the Pushtimarg tradition such as Dwarkadish, the presiding deity at the Dwarkadish Temple. Whilst these paintings focus on Shrinathji, paintings often depicts other deities in the tradition such as Yamunaji, Goswamis such as Vallabhacharya and other priests.

=== Themes ===
Pichhwais have two main functions within the Pushtimarg Sampradaya. Ones used as backdrops on the inner sanctums in the shrines, they are changed daily and are designed in accordance to the season, festival and rituals of that day. Other pichhwais are artists documentation of the worship in the faith. Each festival and ritual within the faith is an elaborate affair with a pichhwai showcasing the adornment, emotions, mood, music, food and dancing that encompasses the worship. With daily worship of Shrinathji having 8 different formal viewings, pichhwais may often depict the eight different adornments associated with each viewing. Festivals such as Govardhan Puja, Sharad Purnima, Raslila, Holi alongside other prominent festivals in Pushtimarg are depicted with vivid detail on the modes of worship and the items used. These Pichwais often also as a historical documentation on how and who participated in these festival throughout the doctrine's history.

== History of Production ==
=== 16th - 19th Century ===
In 1672 CE when the Shrinathji temple was established, Vitthalnath the chief priest and son of the Pushitmarg sect founder Vallabhachrya, employed artisans under the temple administration to create pichhwais. These were traditionally made by the artisans only on commission by the chief priest for religious worship and ceremonies. However in the coming centuries, as the sect grew to various part of India such as Gujarat, and Mathura, the art styles reached those places as well. Pichhwais were made to be taken by pilgrims from Shrinathji temple but were also commissioned by wealthy families. The heavy and intricate nature of this art also led to its favour by theatre companies, with production companies commissioning as backdrops for productions.

=== 19th Century ===
The start of the century had westernised art school painting forms gaining more preferability to the Indian business and upper classes compared to traditional styles such as pichhwai. To increase pichhwai demand, artisans started to make slight shifts in their painting techniques. Pichwais were made both in the traditional style, but also started to incorporate western influences such as using oil paints and using realism rather than the traditional stylistic approach. One example is that the feet drawn in these paintings, particularity that of Shrinathji, were drawn with the western art technique of Foreshortening rather than the traditional portrayal of feet being sideways. However, this time period also had heavy influence from political movements such as the Swadeshi movement, where traditional Indian art, cultures and music was encouraged to be support. This, alongside the religious nature of the art form led artists to favour the traditional art styles and most artisans stayed with using traditional techniques in their own style.

=== Modern Day Production ===
Pichhwai have become the main export of Nathdwara and are in much demand among foreign visitors. The artists live mostly in Chitron ki gali (Street of paintings) and Chitrakaron ka mohallah (colony of painters) and are a close community with constant interaction. Often a pichhwai painting is a group effort, where several skilful painters work together under the supervision of a master artist.

There has also been a push by other artists and designers to preserve and showcase this art form to a wider, international audience. Designers have utilised the traditional colours, printing techniques and pattern styles associated pichhwai, in clothing attires and showcase them on international platforms such as Lakmé Fashion Week.

==== Artisans ====
Whilst little is known before the 19th century, the pichhwai artisans in Nathdwara come from three main sub-castes, the Adi Gaur who claim to have migrated from Udaipur, the Jangirs were migrated from Jaipur and Jodhpur, and the lesser known Mewaras.

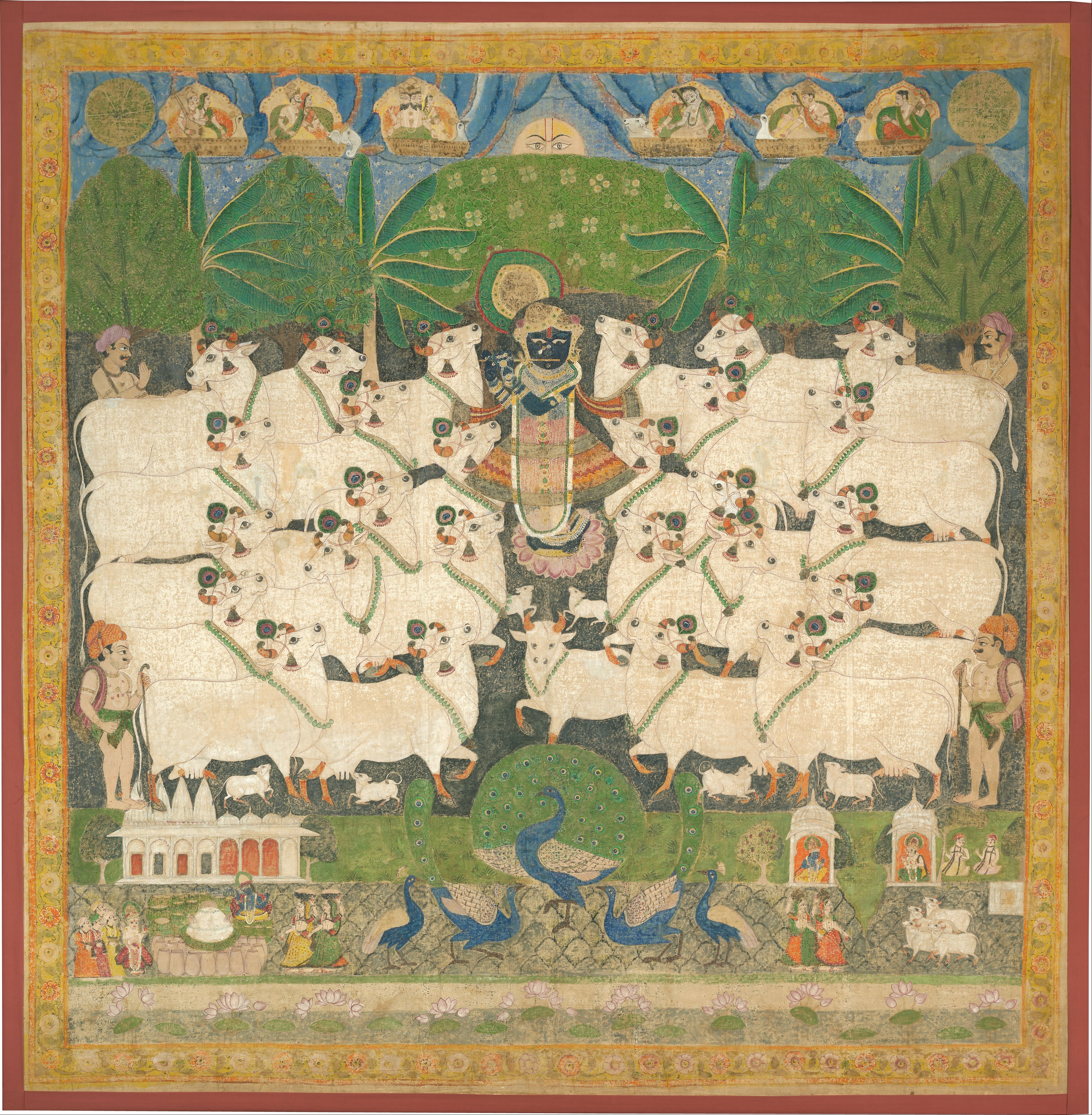
Festival of the Cattle (Gopashtami); shrine hanging, 19th century, 223 cm (87.79″) x 220 cm (86.61″)

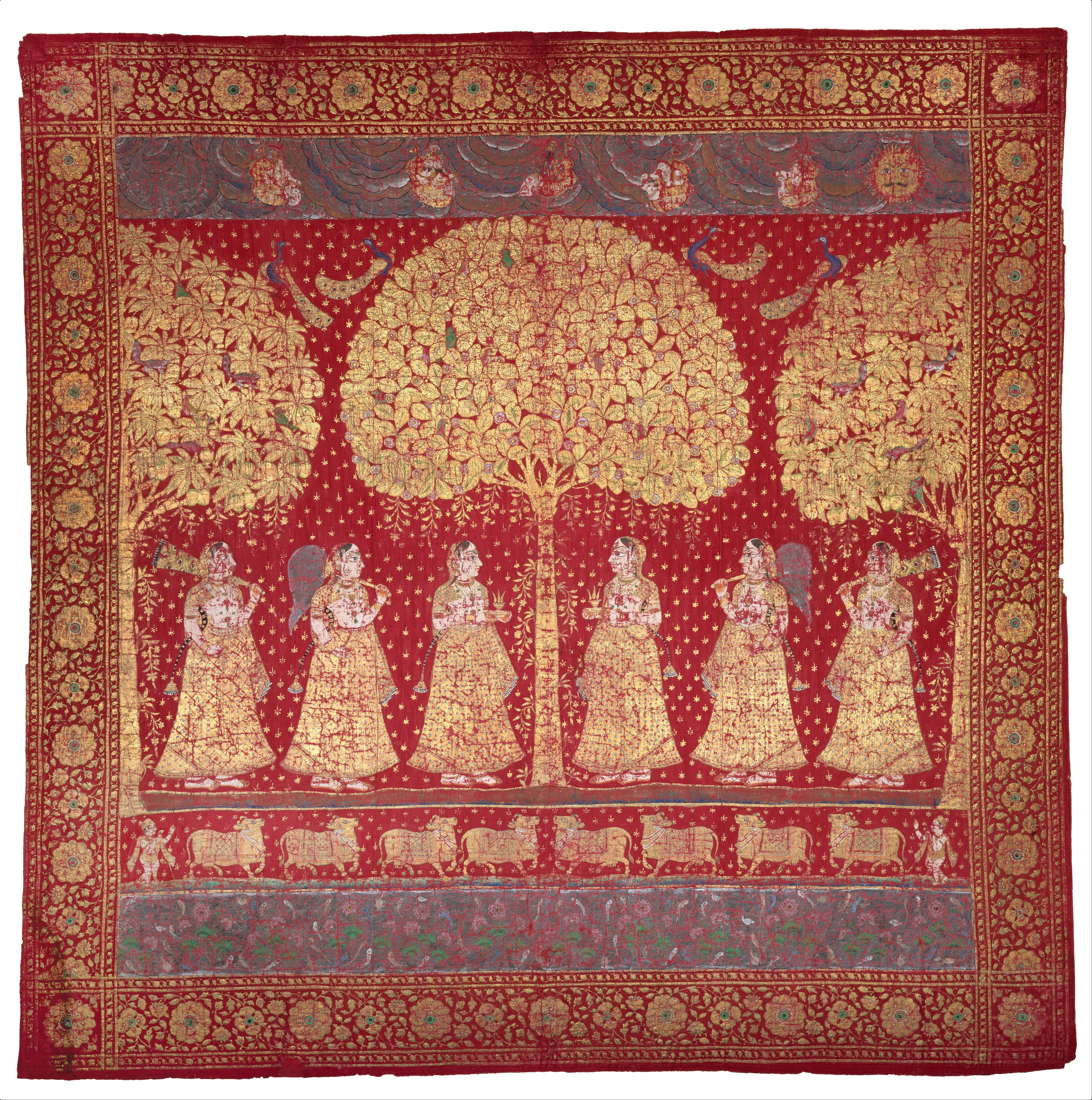
Gopis and cows, late 18th century, cotton plain-weave, dyed and painted with opaque watercolors, gold and silver, 244 cm (96.06″) x 254 cm (100″)

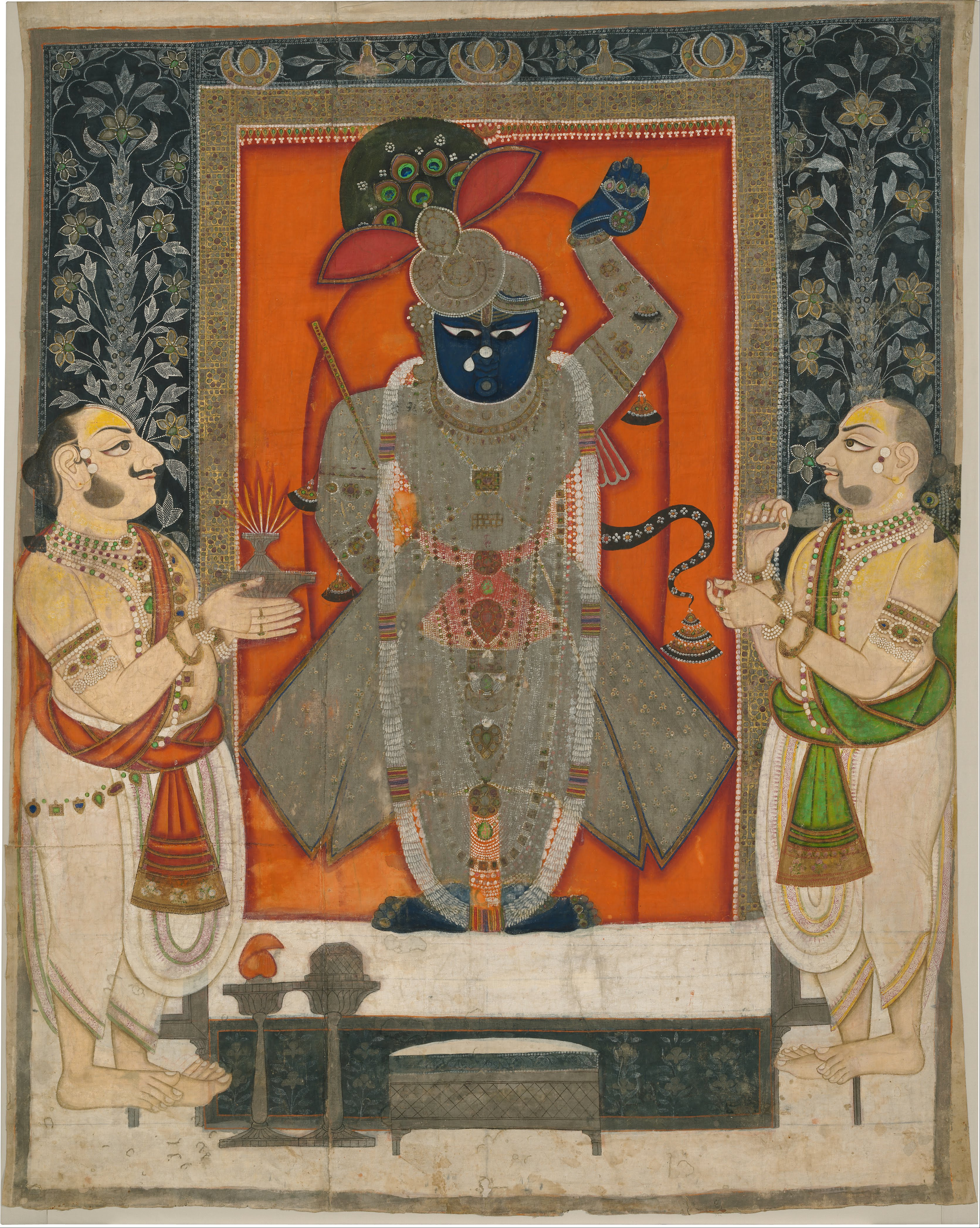
Kota school, Rajasthan, "Priests worshipping Krishna as Shrinathji for Mountain of Food festival (Annakuta utsava), c. 1840, 188.5 cm (74.21″) x 144.5 cm (56.88″)

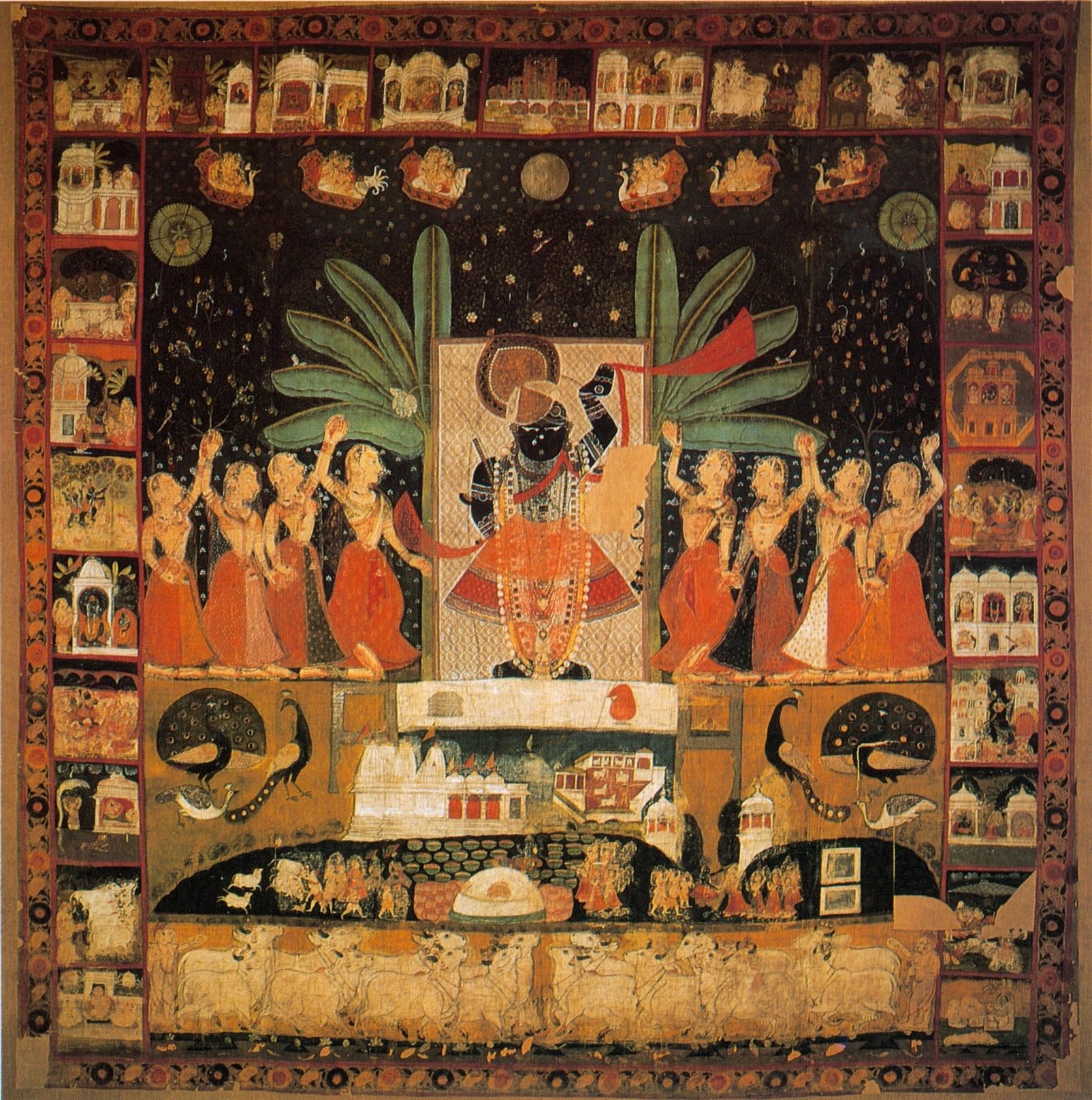
Krishna as Shrinathji and the Dancing Gopis, from the temple of Nathdvara, 19th century

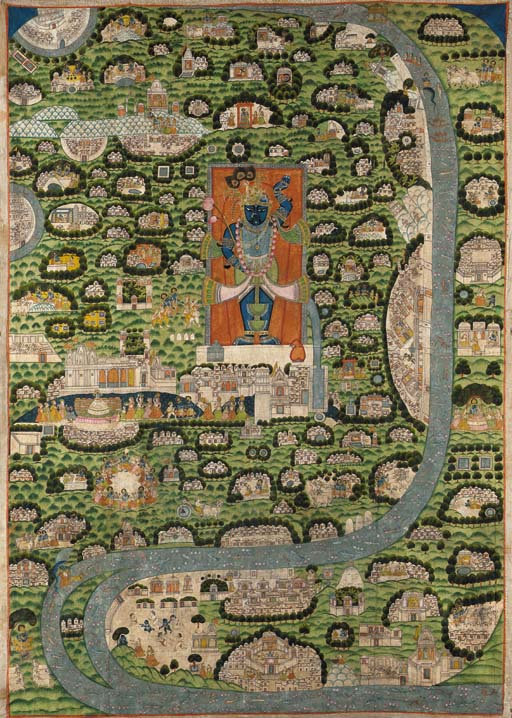
Unusual pichhwai showing the Vraj Parikrama, a circular pilgrimage route around the locations of Krishna's life, 65¾ x 47 in. (168 x 120 cm.), 19th century.
