= Shrinathji Temple =

Hindu temple in Nathdwara, Rajasthan

Coordinates: 24.9289935°N 73.8150981°E

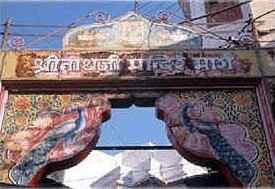
- Gate of the temple

Religion
- Affiliation: Hinduism
- District: Rajsamand
- Deity: Shrinathji (form of Krishna)
- Festivals: Krishna Janmashtami, Holi

Location
- Location: Nathdwara
- State: Rajasthan
- Country: India
- Interactive map of Shrinathji Temple

Architecture
- Type: Heveli architecture inspired by Mewar
- Creator: Maharana Raj Singh of Mewar
- Completed: 1672

Website
- https://www.nathdwaratemple.org/

The Shrinathji Temple is a Hindu temple dedicated to Shrinathji (a form of Krishna) located in Nathdwara. It is considered an important pilgrimage centre by Vaishnavas.

== Legend and history ==
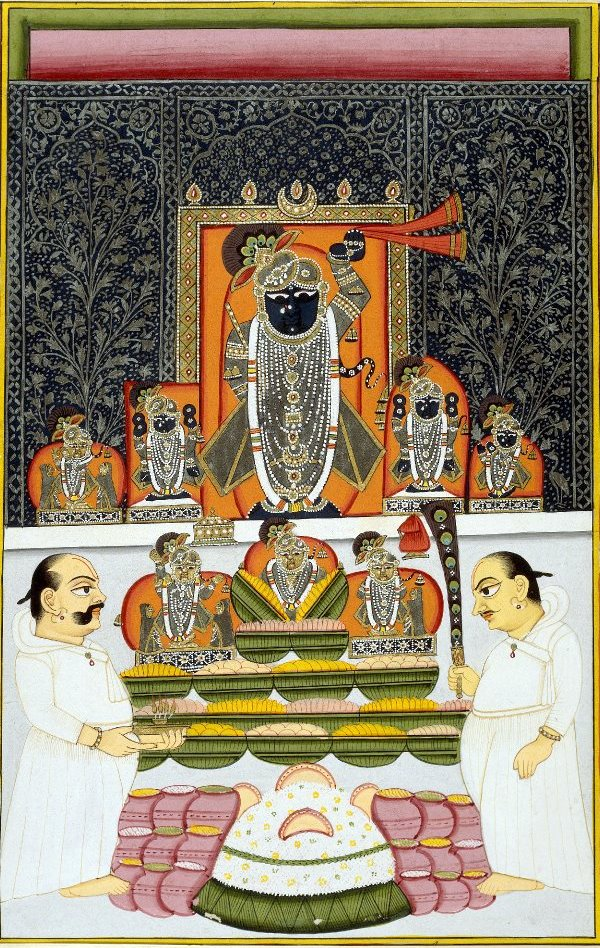
Nathdwara Shrinathji at the autumn Annakuta Festival. Pichvai-style background. Late 18th century.

The svarupam, the divine form of Shrinathji, is said to be self-manifested. According to legends, Krishna self-manifested from a stone and emerged from the Govardhan Hills. In 1466, a Braj resident went to Govardhan Mountain to search for his lost cow when he saw the raised left arm of Shri Govardhanathji. He called other Braj residents to show this to them.

Then, an old Braj resident said: "Lord Shri Krishna protected the Braj residents, the cows of Braj, and Braj itself from the wrath of Indra by carrying Giriraj Govardhan on the finger of his left Consequently, the people of Braj worshipped his left arm. He is standing in the Lord Kandara and now only his left arm is being shown. No one should try to extract the form of God by digging a mountain. His form will be visible only when he wishes." For the next 69 years, the people of Braj used to bathe this upper arm with milk and worship it. An annual fair started being held there on Naga Panchami.

In 1535, a supernatural incident happened in the afternoon of Vaishakh Krishna Ekadashi. Amongst thousands of cows belonging to Saddu Pandey of Anyor village, near Govardhan Mountain, one belonged to the cow dynasty of Nandarayji, called Dhoomar. Every day at 3:00 p.m. she reached where the left arm of Shri Govardhan Nathji had appeared. There was a hole in which the cow returned a stream of milk from its udder. Pandey suspected the cowherd milked the Dhoomar cow in the afternoon, as the cow did not give milk in the evening. One day, he followed the cow to observe the situation; he saw the cow stood at Govardhan Hill and milk started flowing from its udders. Pandey was surprised; when he went near him, he saw the Mukharvind of Shri Govardhan Nathji. On the same day, Shri Vallabhacharya appeared in Champaran, Chhattisgarh. Shri Govardhannathji said to Pandey - "My name is Devdaman, and my other names are Indradaman and Nagdaman." Pandey's wife, Bhavani, and daughter, Naron, used to go to Devdaman daily to get the milk of Dhoomar cow, for healing.

Historically, the image of Shrinathji was first worshipped at Govardhan hill, near Mathura. The image was moved from Mathura in 1672 CE along the river Yamuna and was retained at Agra for almost six months to safeguard it from the Mughal ruler Aurangzeb. Subsequently, the image was transferred further south via chariot to a safer place, to protect it from destruction by Aurangzeb. When the deity reached the spot at village Sihad, the wheels of the bullock cart in which the deity was being transported sank axle-deep in mud and could not be moved any further. The accompanying priests realised that this place was the Lord's chosen spot and thus, a temple was built there under the rule and protection of the then Maharana Raj Singh of Mewar. Shrinathji Temple is also known as 'Haveli of Shrinathji' (mansion). The temple was built by Goswami Damodar Das Bairagi in 1672.

=== Holkar's attack and Shrinathji's rescue by Maharana ===
In 1802, Jaswant Rao Holkar moved to Mewar after being defeated by Daulat Rao Sindhia and advanced towards Nathdwara to plunder the town and the temple. News of Holkar's march was received in Nathdwara and Goswamiji asked Maharana Bhim Singh for help. An escort was sent of Thakurs of Delwara, Kunthwa, Argya, Mohi, Kothariya to escort the deity to Udaipur. Goswamiji reached Udaipur with the image of Shrinathji, Navin Priyaji, and Vitthal Nathji on 29 January 1802. At Unawas, Thakur Vijay Singh of Kothariya and his men fought with Holkar's army and were killed in battle. Holkar's army soon reached Nathdwara. Holkar's men first plundered the town mercilessly and then demanded 10 Lakh rupees. With the mediation of Seth Balachand, the amount was brought down to 1 Lakh. Singhvi Motichand was sent to negotiate further, but Holkar arrested him, broke the locks of the temple, and looted the valuables. Holkar's army then plundered the entire district before marching to Banera.

Later, Shrinathji temple at Ghasiyar was built, where the deity was shifted from Udaipur. After a few years, the deity was returned to Nathdwara. The temple of Shrinathji at Ghasiyar is still open.

In the 1870s the temple became the object of a prolonged confrontation between its hereditary head, Tilkayat Giridhar, and the darbar of Mewar. In 1875 the Regency Council governing Mewar during the minority of Maharana Sajjan Singh, chaired by the British officer Colonel Herbert, resolved to depose Giridhar, and on 8 May 1876 the darbar's troops seized him at Nathdwara in a bloodless operation and escorted him to Udaipur, installing his minor son Govardhanlal (r. 1876–1934) as tilkayat. Govardhanlal was made to acknowledge the suzerainty of the maharana; the administrative and judicial authority previously exercised by the tilkayat was revoked, and the darbar appointed a manager to supervise the temple's affairs and revenues, leaving the performance of seva to Shrinathji under Govardhanlal's supervision.

In 1934, an order was issued by the Udaipur King, Darbar, by which, among other things, declared that all property dedicated, presented, or otherwise coming to the deity Shrinathji was property of the shrine. The Tilkayat Maharaj and the manager and trustee of the property were merely custodians at the time; the Udaipur Darbar had absolute right to supervise that the 562 properties dedicated to the shrine were used for legitimate purposes.

=== Legend ===
According to the hagiography of the Pushtimarg, Shrinathji travelled to Mewar to play chaupar (an antecedent to pachisi) with a princess called Ajab Kunvari. She was upset whenever Shrinathji would go back to Braj and asked him to stay with her in the palace. Shrinathji said that one day, when the time was right, he would re-locate to Rajasthan.

Presently, Shrinathji's worship is performed by direct male descendants of Vallabha in a haveli (lit. palatial home) in Nathdwara, Rajasthan.

Economy and livelihoods in Nathdwara town revolve around the haveli, the term used for the temple as it was situated in a fortified mansion, or haveli, once a royal palace of the Sesodia Rajput rulers of Mewar.

Shrinathji was popular with other medieval devotees as there were preachers who founded Shrinathji temples in present-day Pakistan (Dera Ghazi Khan). This was done by Shri Lal Maharaj Ji and his deity of Shri Gopi Nath Ji and Shri Dau Ji of Dera Ghazi Khan, earlier a part of undivided India and not far from here. Shrinathji was even worshiped as far away as Volga, Russia, and other places on the Central Asian trade routes.

== Structure and design ==
The temple is designed in the lines of Nanda (Krishna's foster-father) temple, in Gokul. Therefore, it is also known as Nanda Bhavan or Nandalaya (the House of Nanda).

Structurally, a kalasha on the shikhara marks the top of the temple, on which seven flags are flown along with the Sudarshana Chakra and each flag has its own representation of a specific Sakha (boyfriend) or Sakhi (girlfriend) of Shrinathji and the Shyam (Black) colour represents Shrinathji. The temple is popularly called Shrinathji ki Haveli (House of Shrinathji). With the mood of worship in Pushti Marg, Shrinathji is not seen as an impersonal God so worship is not done in a temple. Shrinathji is seen as Thakorji, or lord of the House, or Haveli and seva (service) is offered, rather than worship. Like a regular household, it has a chariot for movement, a storeroom for milk (Doodhghar), a storeroom for betel (Paanghar), a storeroom for sugar and sweetmeats (Mishrighar and Pedaghar), a storeroom for flowers (Phoolghar), a functional kitchen (Rasoighar), a jewellery chamber (Gahnaghar), a treasury (Kharcha bhandaar), a stable for horses of chariot (Ashvashala), a drawing room (Baithak), and a gold and silver grinding wheel (Chakki). The chariot is the same one in which Shrinathji was brought to Singhar.

The Nathdwara temple has subsidiary temples dedicated to the deity Madan Mohanji and Navneet Priyaji, located in the main complex.

== Image of Shrinathji ==
Shrinathji symbolises a form of Krishna, when he lifted the Govardhan hill, with one arm raised. The image is made of black marble, where the image is revealed with his left hand raised and the right hand forming a fist at the waist, with a large diamond placed beneath the lips. The deity is carved in bas-relief out of a monolithic black marble stone, with images of two cows, one lion, one snake, two peacocks, and one parrot engraved on it, with three sages placed near it.

The iconography at the temple has given birth to Nathdwara Paintings.

== Festivals and rituals ==
Devotees fill the shrine during occasions like Janmashtami, Holi, and Diwali. The deity is treated like a living image, and is attended with daily functions, like bathing, dressing, meals called "bhog", and resting in regular intervals. Since the deity is believed to be the infant, special care is taken. The priests in all Havelis are Brahmins under Gurus who are the kula (descendants) of Vallabha, the founder of this deity's image at Govardhan hill, near Mathura.

The main attractions are the Aartis and the Shringar, i.e. the dressing and beautifying of the deity of Shrinathji, which is changed seven times daily and treated as a living person. It is adorned with the clothes appropriate for the time of day or night. The intricately woven shaneels and silk cloth have original zari and embroidery work on them, with large quantities of precious jewellery. The formal prayers are offered with veneration ceremony (aarti), flowers (Malaji), fruit (Hari Mewā) and other offerings (Sakhdi, Anasakhdi, Doodhghar Samagria and etc), with local instruments and devotional songs of the Shrinathji, according to the demand of the time and occasion. The view of the deity after the parda (curtain) is removed is called jhakhi.

== Administration ==
The temple has been administered since 1959 under the Nathdwara Temple Act, a law of the Rajasthan legislature. The Act vests ownership of the temple and all its endowments, including offerings, in the deity Shrinathji, and entitles a statutory body, the Nathdwara Temple Board, to their possession; the administration of the temple and its endowments vests in the board. The Goswami, the hereditary occupant of the gaddi of Tilkayat Maharaj, serves as ex-officio president of the board if not disqualified and willing to serve, while day-to-day management rests with a chief executive officer appointed by the state government, who must be a person professing the Hindu religion.

The Nathdwara Temple Act was challenged by Tilkayat Govindlalji, the temple's traditional spiritual head, as an infringement of Articles 25 and 26 of the Constitution of India, on the ground that the temple was privately owned and managed by him as head of the Vallabha denomination. In Tilkayat Shri Govindlalji Maharaj v. State of Rajasthan (AIR 1963 SC 1638), the Supreme Court of India upheld the Act, holding that the Tilkayat was "merely a custodian, manager and trustee of the temple" and giving particular weight to a 1934 firman issued by the ruler of Udaipur declaring the royal court's right to supervise the temple and its property.

== See also ==
- Shrinathji Temple, Bahrain
