= Shrinathji =

Form of Krishna, manifest as a seven-year-old child

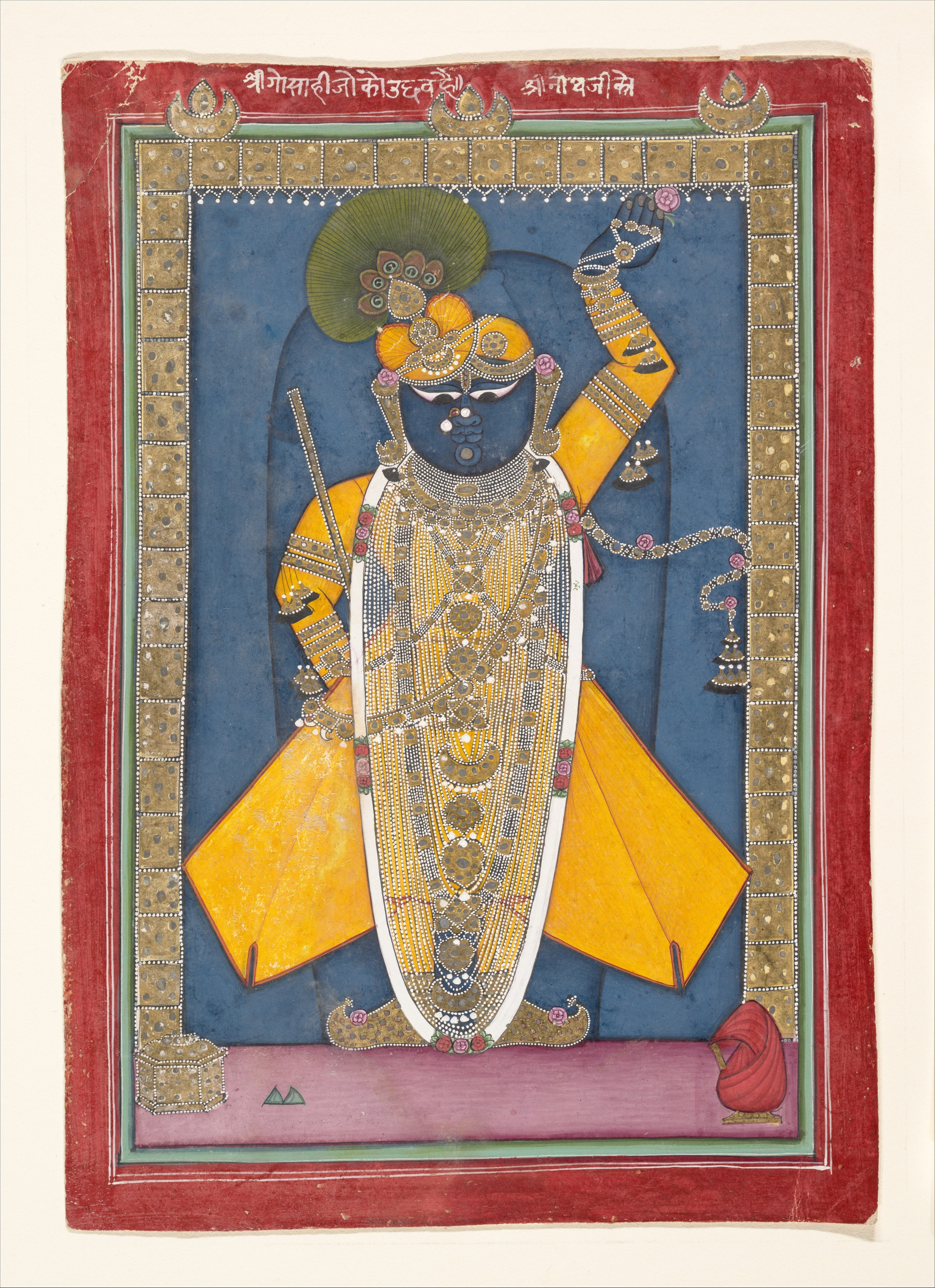
- Painting of Shrinathji, c. 1840
- Venerated in: Pushtimarg
- Affiliation: Krishnaism-Vaishnavism
- Region: Nathdwara
- Temple: Shrinathji Temple

Shrinathji is a form of Krishna, manifested as a seven-year-old child. Shrinathji is the central presiding deity of the Vaishnava sect known as Pushtimarg (the way of grace) or the Vallabha Sampradaya, established by saint Vallabhacharya.

Shrinathji is worshipped mainly by followers of Bhakti Yoga and the Vaishnavas in Gujarat and Rajasthan, as well as the Bhatias among others.

Vitthal Nathji, son of Vallabhacharya institutionalised the worship of Shrinathji at Nathdwara. On account of the popularity of Shrinathji, Nathdwara city itself is referred to as ‘Shrinathji’. People also call it Bava's (Shreenathji Bava) Nagri. Initially, the child Krishna deity was referred to as Devadāman ("the conqueror of Gods", referring to the overpowering of Indra by Krishna in the lifting of Govardhan hill). Vallabhacharya named him as Gopala and the place of his worship as ‘Gopalpur’. Later, Vitthal Nathji named the deity as Shrinathji. Shrinathji's seva is performed in 8 parts of the day. The principal shrine of Shrinathji is the Shrinathji Temple in the temple city of Nathdwara, 48 kilometres north-east of Udaipur city in Rajasthan, India.

== History ==
According to the legend, the icon of Shrinathji self-manifested from stone and emerged from Govardhan Hill. Historically, the image of Shrinathji was first worshipped at Govardhan hill, near Mathura. The image was initially shifted from Mathura in 1672 A.D. along river Yamuna and was retained at Agra for almost six months, to safeguard it from, according to legend, the Mughal ruler Aurangzeb, who wanted to destroy the idol. Subsequently, the image was transferred further south on a chariot to a safer place to protect it from the iconoclasm of Aurangzeb. When the icon reached the spot at village Sihad or Sinhad in Mewar, the wheels of the chariot are said to have sunken into the mud and could not be moved any further. The accompanying priests realized that the place was the Shrinathji's chosen spot and, accordingly, the icon was installed in a temple there under the rule and protection of the then Maharana Raj Singh of Mewar. No other Hindu ruler was ready to take the image into his kingdom, as it would mean opposing Aurangzeb, who was the most intolerant man in India at that time.

In the anomical environment of the late 18th and early 19th centuries, the temple of Shrinathji was attacked by the Medas and the Pindaris. Accordingly, the icon was shifted again and was protected at Udaipur and Ghasiyar under the patronage of Maharana Bheem Singh of Mewar.

== Nathdwara Temple or Haveli ==
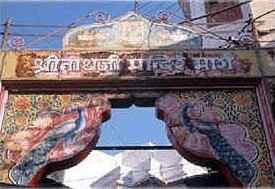
Gate of the Shrinathji Temple

The Nathdwara temple was built in the 17th century. The temple is popularly called Shrinathji ki Haveli (House of Shrinathji). Like a regular mansion, it has a chariot for movement (the original chariot in which Shrinathji was brought to Singhar), a store room for milk (Doodhghar), a store room for betel (Paanghar), a store room for sugar and sweets (Mishrighar and Pedaghar), a store room for flowers (Phoolghar), a functional kitchen (Rasoighar), a jewellery chamber (Gahnaghar), a treasury (Kharcha bhandaar), a stable for horses of the chariot (Ashvashala), a drawing room (Baithak), a gold and silver grinding wheel (Chakki).

Nathdwara is known as the "Vraj" of western India. Over 100,000 Hindus visit Nathdwara in a year.

== Icon at Nathdwara ==
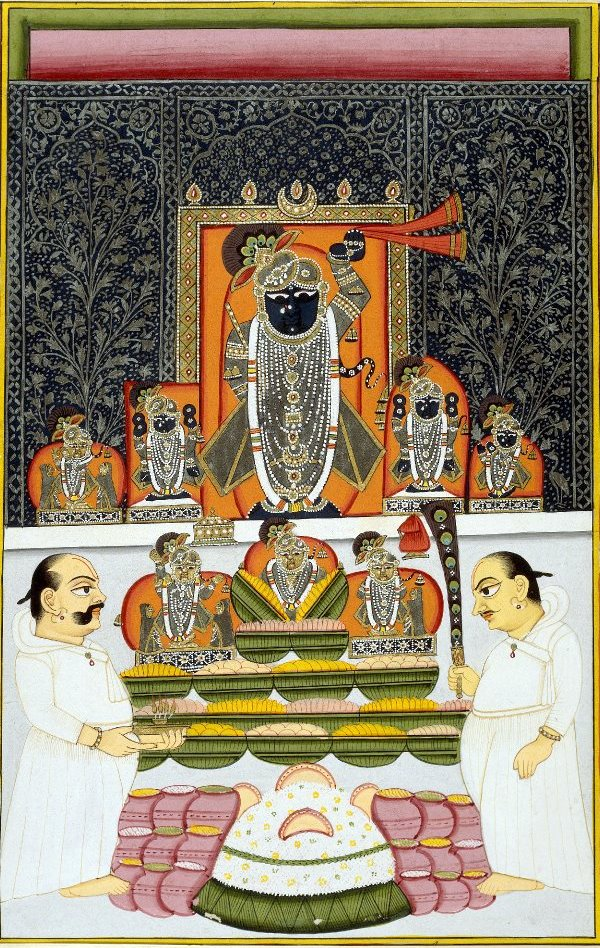
Nathdwara Srinathji at representing the autumn Annakuta Festival. Late 18th century.

The icon is carved in bas-relief out of a monolithic black marble stone, with images of two cows, one lion, one snake, two peacocks, and one parrot engraved on it and three sages placed near it. The icon of Shrinathji wears exquisitely worked jewels, some dating back to the pre-Mughal period.

Shrinathji is adorned with intricately woven shaneels and silk clothes having original zari and embroidery works. The icon changes its clothes (vastra) eight times a day. During festive days like Janmashtmi, Holi, and Diwali, the icon wears dresses which are woven with gold wires and diamond-studded embroidery. Once worn, the clothes are not reused, but given to devotees.

== Festivals and rituals at the temple ==
The Shrinathji temple at Nathdwara celebrates, on average, three festivals in a week. As regards daily routine, the inner sanctum is opened 8 times a day for devotees to undertake sacred darshan of the deity. Very elaborate and complex rituals have emerged around the worship of Shrinathji due to confluence and inter-mixing of bhakti of Krishna as well as that of Pushti Margi Shri Vallabhacharya.

The main attractions of Shrinathji are the Aartis and the Shringar, i.e., the dressing and beautifying of the icon of Shrinathji, treating it as a living child, adorning it with the appropriate dresses commensurate with the time of day or night. The formal prayers are offered with diya, flowers, fruit, and other offerings, with local instruments and devotional songs of the Shrinathji, according to the demand of the time and occasion. The view of the icon after the parda (curtain) is removed is called jhakhi.

The gadipatis and acharyas in the Havelis of Shrinathji are believed to be from the kul (descendants) of Shri Mahaprabhuji, Vallabhacharya, the founder of this deity's icon at Govardhan hill, near Mathura. Presently, Shrinathji is worshipped by priests from this kul (genealogical descendants) of Vallabh Acharya. In the rest of the world, a Gurjar of a special sect who has initiation and agya (permission) performs the worship of Shrinathji.

Devotees throng to the shrine in large numbers during occasions of Janmashtami, Radhashtami, Sharad Purnima, Holi, and Diwali. The deity is treated like a living image, and is attended with daily normal functions, like bathing, dressing, meals called "Prasad", and resting times in regular intervals. Since the deity is believed to be a child form of Krishna, special care is taken and attention is given to the deity, in the same way a mother would to her child.

Krishna Janmashtami, the birth anniversary of Krishna, is celebrated with the salute of cannons and guns at Nathdwara temple of Shrinathji in Rajasthan.

People not only from the internal regions of Rajasthan but also from Gujarat and Maharashtra visit Nathdwara to witness Krishna's seraphic festival. Here, important arrangements are made by the temple trust for security at the police and administrative levels. The temple is decorated with attractive lighting for the festival. The entire city of Nathdwara reverberates owing to the melodious sound of the drum, trumpet, and clarinet at the main entrance of the temple. A series of congratulatory exchanges began pouring in a month earlier, from the Ashtami of Shravan of the Krishna. According to the confirmation order, Shri Krishna Janmotsav is not celebrated as a public exhibition at night, but on the second day, as the Nandamahotsav, that is, by affirming 'Nand Gher Anand Bhayo, Jai Kanhaiya Lal ki’ in the presence of Tilakayat Maharaj Shree and his family, Brajvasi Sevakgan (Brigadian staff), Mukhiyaji (Headman), and Shrinathji along with spattering of milk and curd while dancing in front of them.

=== Daily ritual of 8 darshans ===
==== Legend ====
The gopikas of Vraj used to love the Lord so much, they would be at Yashoda's door at all hours, finding any excuse to see their beloved Nanda Gopal. Mother Yashoda was very protective of her darling child. Concerned that with all these adoring gopis hanging around her house at all hours of the day, her darling child will never get any time to rest or play properly with his friends. So she decided that all those who wish to visit her beloved Bala Gopal could do so after he had finished a snack or a meal, and was resting before going out again.

==== Ritual ====
Taking a legend as his cue, Mahaprabhu Vallabhacharya decided to open the haveli, his own version of the Nandalay (House / Palace of Nanda, foster father of Krishna), at specific times of the day only. Acharya set aside eight times of the day when the doors of the inner sanctum would be left open for the people to catch a glimpse ("jakhi") of the Lord. The rest of the time, the Lord was allowed to go out and play with His friends—gopas and gopies of Vraj.

The sequence of eight darshans is set out below.

1. Mangala: First darshan of the day. Lord, having woken up, has just had His breakfast and greets his devotees with the most "auspicious" darshan of the day. This darshan usually occurs at dawn.
2. Shringar: Having bathed and dressed her little darling, Mother Yashoda allows everyone to adore her baby. After this darshan, the Lord goes out to play with His friends.
3. Gval: Having had his mid-morning snack, the Lord is about to go out to herd the cows of Nandaji. Lord is worshipped by reciting His thousand names, and the sacred tulsi (basil) leaves are offered with each Name.
4. Rajbhog: After His mid-day meal, the Lord is resting in the comfort of Nanadalay. Lord is often most regal and resplendent for this darshan. Fresh garlands and lotuses are offered to the Lord. During the arti, the Lord plays chopat, an ancient board game or version of chess to while away the hot afternoon.
5. Utthanpan: The Lord has just woken up from His afternoon nap.
6. Bhog: Having had His afternoon snack, the Lord is about to go out to play again.
7. Sandhya: As the sun dips over the western horizon, the Lord returns with the herds of Nandaji, and the gopis come to see their beloved. Mother Yashoda wards off any evil that may have befallen her darling in the woods of Vraj, by doing an art, and the Lord bathes for the evening meal.
8. Shayan: Having had His dinner, the Lord is about to go off to his bedchamber. This is the last public darshan of the day.

The outline of darshans given above is a general layout. Over the centuries, different Goswamis have interpreted the "bhavas" and "lilas" differently, resulting in a mixture of oral and ritual traditions followed by the various havelies of Pushti Marg. For example, Shrinathji, having left His beloved Vraj, misses it so dearly that for six months of the year, He runs back to Vraj for the shayan darshan. So, from Mangala to Sandhya arti, the Lord is reckoned to be in Nathadwara. After the arti, He rushes over, in His spiritual form, to play with the gopis of Vraj. Hence, Shayan arti takes place at Mount Govardhan for the warm half of the year. During the cold months, running over to Vraj is not such a practical option, and hence the shayan darshan takes place at Nathadwara. Here, the bhava of Gopijan's viraha and Raasa-Rasika's unique lila are of paramount importance.

== In art and culture ==
Shrinathji followers have a significant influence on Hindu art in the form of the Pichhwais, which are intricate and colourful paintings on cloth, paper, walls, and temple hangings that portray Shrinathji. These are devotional textiles that centre on the image of Shrinathji. Nathdwara is the hub of the pichhwai art, Nathdwara Paintings.

Nathdwara is known for the Rajasthani style of the city, which is called "pichhwai Paintings." These pichhwai paintings have been painted on the wall around the Nathdwara temple by famous contemporary artists of Nathdwara.

== Worship at other places ==
Preachers have founded Shrinathji temples in present-day Pakistan (Dera Ghazi Khan), earlier a part of undivided India and not far from Nathdwara. This was done by Shri Lalji Maharaj, who was sent to Sindh by Shri Vithalnathji to spread Pushti Marg. Shrinathji is also worshipped at Russia (in the lower Volga region) and other places on the Central Asian trade routes. In the United States, there are eleven Shrinathji temples; New Haven, Connecticut, Parlin, New Jersey, Schuylkill Haven, Pennsylvania, Phoenix, Arizona, one in the midwest, Florida and California, Houston ( Texas), Lowell, Massachusetts Atlanta, Georgia Charlotte, North Carolina Baltimore, Maryland, Dallas (Texas) Shreenath Dham Haveli.

In 2013, the first Shrinathji haveli was inaugurated under the guidance of Shri Dwarkeshlalji (Kadi Kalol) in Melbourne, Australia. Vrajdham Haveli, located in Margao, Goa, was inaugurated in 2013 for the benefit of all the Vaishnavas residing in Goa.

There is a Shrinathji Temple in Bahrain, which was constructed in 1817 and is used by the Hindu community of Bahrain.

There is a shrine dedicated to Shrinathji in the Hindu Temple complex in Dubai, UAE.

== See also ==
- Dwarkadhish Ji
- Charbhuja
- Kankroli
- Sanwaliaji
