= Nathdwara painting =

Painting tradition that emerged in Western India

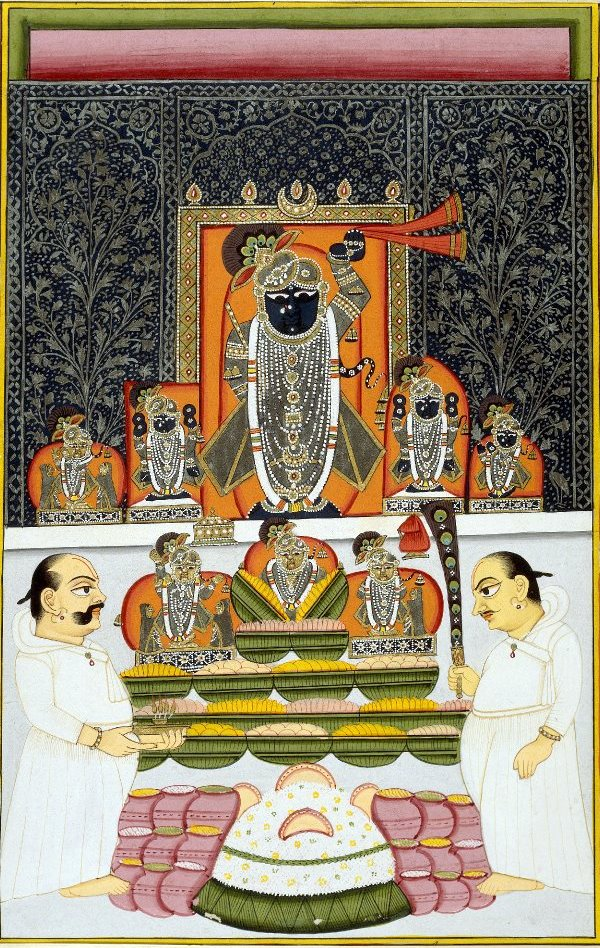
Annakuta Festival, unknown artist, late 18th century. This annual festival is observed by donating a mountain of food, usually rice, to the temple to symbolise the moment Krishna lifted Mount Govardhan to protect his villagers. British Museum

The head priest (Tilakayat) Govardhanlalji makes offerings to Shrinathji, by Ghasiram Sharma (1869-1931). Cleveland Museum of Art

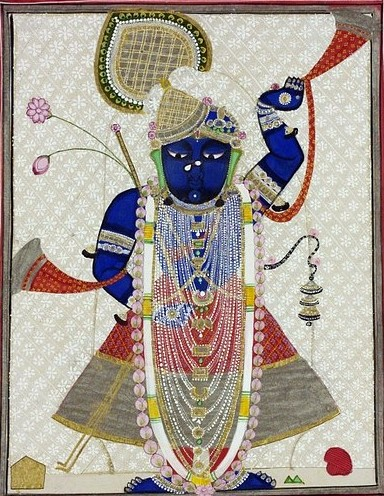
Krishna as Srinathji, unknown artist, late 19th century. Victoria and Albert Museum

Nathdwara Painting refers to a painting tradition and school of art that emerged in Nathdwara, a city in Rajsamand district in the Western state of Rajasthan in India. Inspired by the Thanjavur Painting, Nathdwara paintings are of different sub-styles of which Pichhwai paintings are the most popular. The word Pichwai derives from the Sanskrit words pich meaning back and wais meaning hanging. These paintings are cloth paintings hung behind the image of the Hindu god Shrinathji.

== Origin and area ==
The Nathdwara school is a subset of the Mewar school of painting and is seen as an important school in the 17th and 18th century miniature paintings. The sub-styles of Mewar painting include Udaigarh, Devgarh and Nathdwara as important centers of miniature painting art. The temple of Shrinathji is believed to have provided a boost to the art activities in the town. It is recorded that to avoid the oppression of the iconoclast Mughal emperor Aurangzeb, the image of Shrinathji, a child manifestation of Krishna was installed in Nathdwara in 1670 by Goswami priests from Mathura. After this, many artists, including the famous Acharya Gopinathji, motivated by religious fervor came and created paintings of Srinathji.

Pichhwai are intricate paintings which portray various aspects of Lord Krishna's life. This art has become an undivided part of the Nathdwara culture.

Pichhwais are used to visually narrate tales of Krishna. These paintings are distributed internationally.

These artists mostly live in Chitron ki gali (Street of paintings) and Chitrakaron ka mohallah (colony of painters) and make a close community with constant interaction. It is no wonder that many times a Pichhwai painting is a group effort, where several skillful painters work together under the supervision of a master artist.

== Themes ==
Most works produced in this style revolve around the figure of Shrinathji as a manifestation of Krishna and refer to the incident of him holding the Govardhan hill on his last finger. Each pichwai painting is considered a seva or an offering to the deity and hence personifies Shrinathji as a prince with jewels and luxuries, surrounded by the milkmaids, gopis. These seva themes are based on different seasons and paintings are made to depict different moods of the season. There are also paintings that show the Lord in different costumes celebrating different festivals. Other themes like Mata Yashoda, Nandlal and Balgopal figures are also painted in this style. Some of the paintings are gem-encrusted.

== See also ==
- Rajput painting
- Pichhwai
