= Pushtimarga Sampradaya =

Vaishnava tradition of Hinduism founded by Vallabha

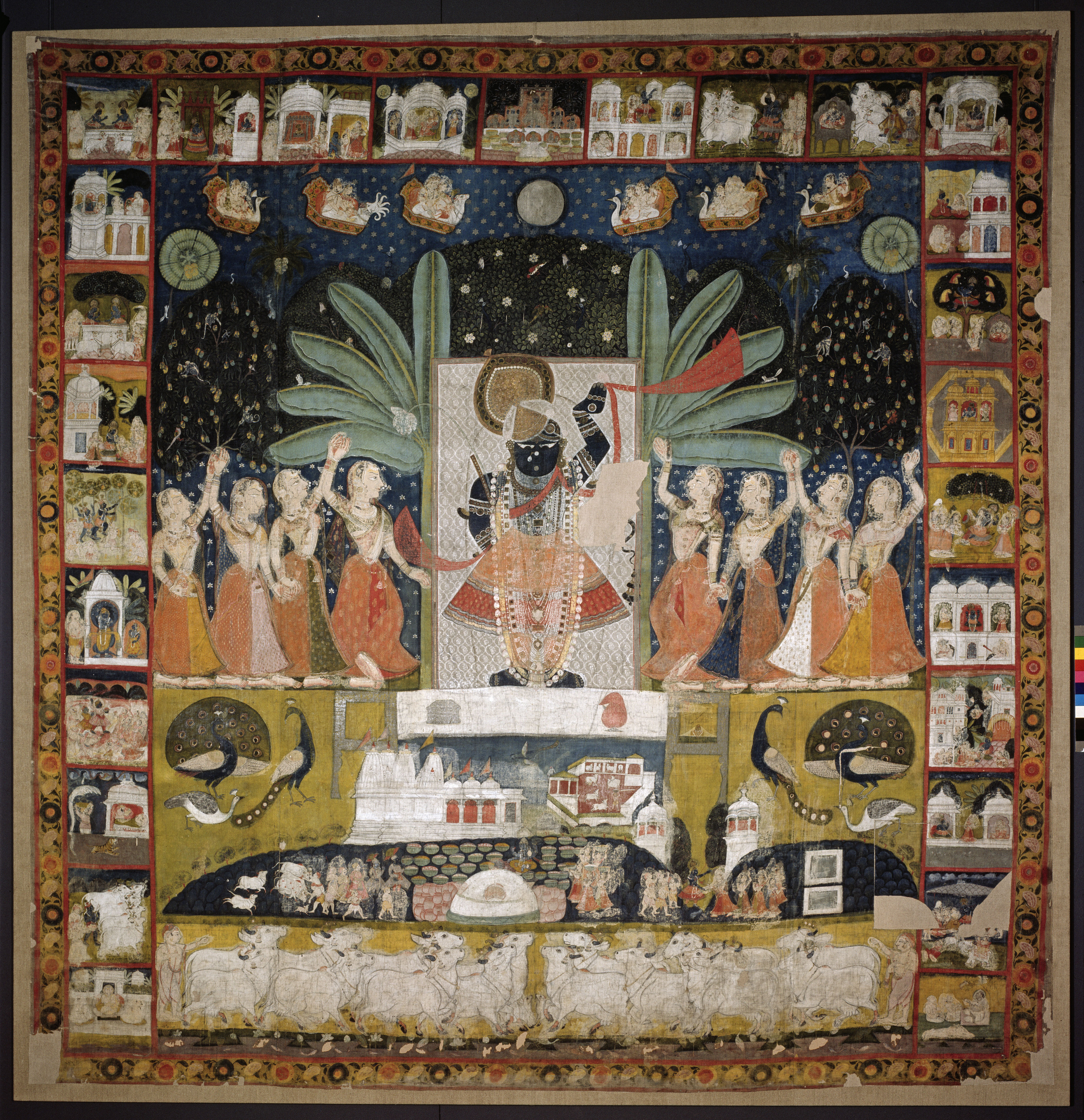
Pichhwai of Śrī Nāthajī (center) with Aṣṭa Sakhīs (top half) and Govardhana Pūjā (lower half)

The Puṣṭimārga, also known as Pushtimarg (Path of Nourishing or Flourishing) or Vallabha Sampradāya, is a Hindu Vaiṣṇava saṁpradāya. It was established in the early 16th century by Vallabha (1479–1530) and further developed by his descendants, particularly his son Viṭṭhalanātha. Followers of the Puṣṭimārga worship Kr̥ṣṇa and engage in devotional practices centered around the youthful Kr̥ṣṇa as depicted in the Bhāgavata Purāṇa, and the pastimes at Govardhan Hill.

The Puṣṭimārga sect follows the Śuddhadvaita philosophy of Vallabha. According to this philosophy, Kr̥ṣṇa is considered the supreme deity and the source of everything. The human soul is believed to be imbued with Kr̥ṣṇa's divine light, and spiritual liberation is thought to result from Kr̥ṣṇa's grace. The sect worships Kr̥ṣṇa through sevā, a practice in which his images or svarūpas ("self forms") are served and entertained with food, drink, music, and art, recreating his daily routine as a youth in Braj.

The followers of this tradition are known as Pushtimargis or Pushtimargiya Vaishnavas. This sect is prominent in the Indian states of Rajasthan and Gujarat, as well as in their regional diasporas around the world. The Shrinathji Temple in Nathdwara is the main shrine of Pushtimarg, with its origins dating back to 1669.

== History ==
=== Vallabha ===
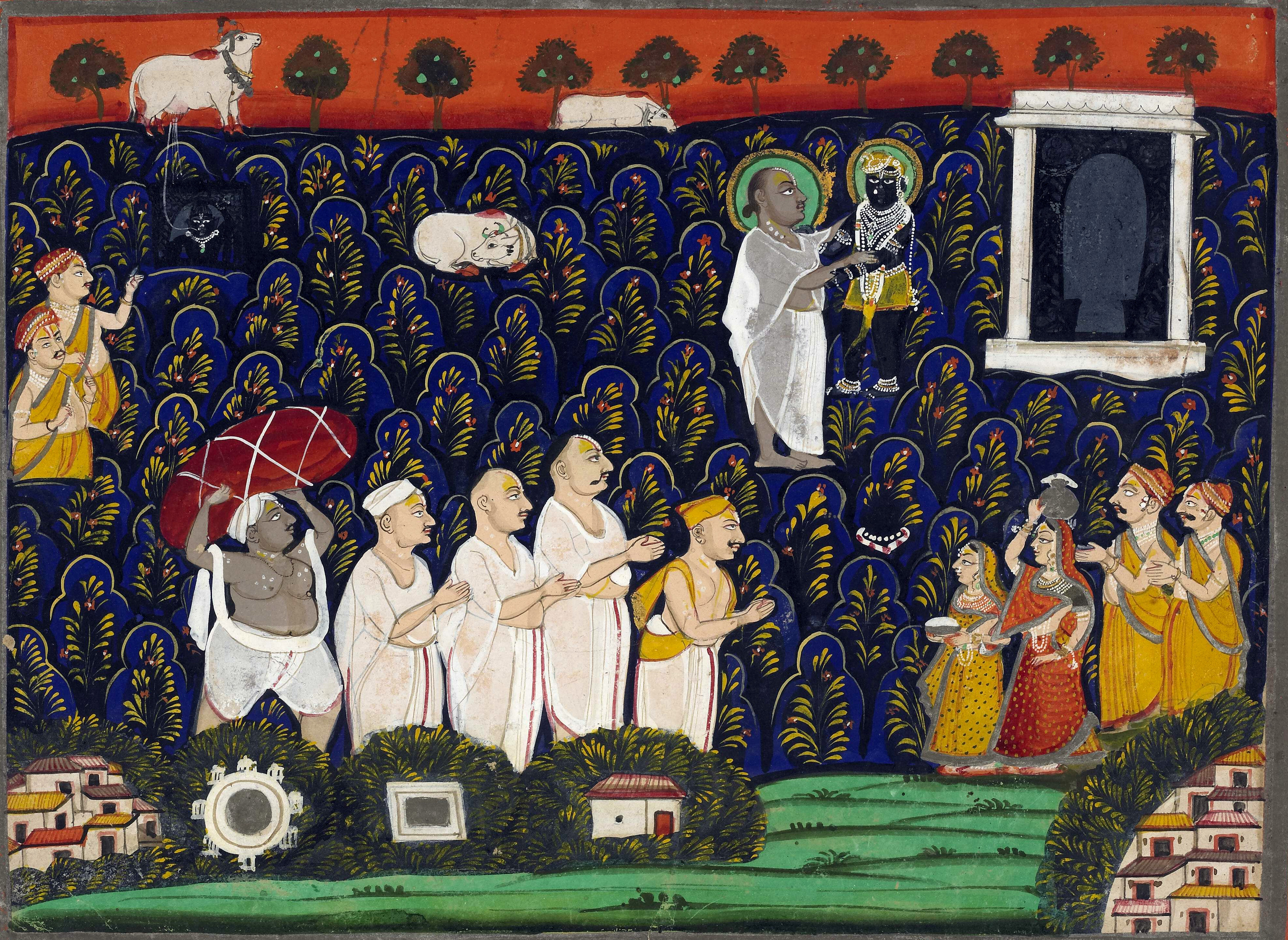
Painting of the discovery of Śrī Nāthajī and his meeting with Vallabha, 19th century

Vallabha was born into a Telugu Brahmin family in South India. He received a traditional education in Sanskrit scriptures and was a precocious student. In 1494, around the age of 15, he had a vision in which he acquired the Brahmasambandha mantra from Kr̥ṣṇa which was to be used to clean the faults of the human soul. He first bestowed the mantra on Dāmodardās Harsānī who would become the first member of the Puṣṭimārga. When he went to Govardhan Hill he declared that the stone being worshipped as Devadamana was the svarūpa of Śrī Nāthajī and instituted the formal sevā of the deity. He adopted the householder form of life and had two sons, Gopīnātha and Viṭṭhalanātha. Throughout his life he made three pilgrimage tours of India where he won converts mainly from the Gangetic plain and Gujarat, with converts tending to belong to mercantile or agricultural castes to whom Vallabha's ideals of socio-religious purity were appealing. He died in 1530, designating his elder son Gopīnātha as his successor.

=== Viṭṭhalanātha ===
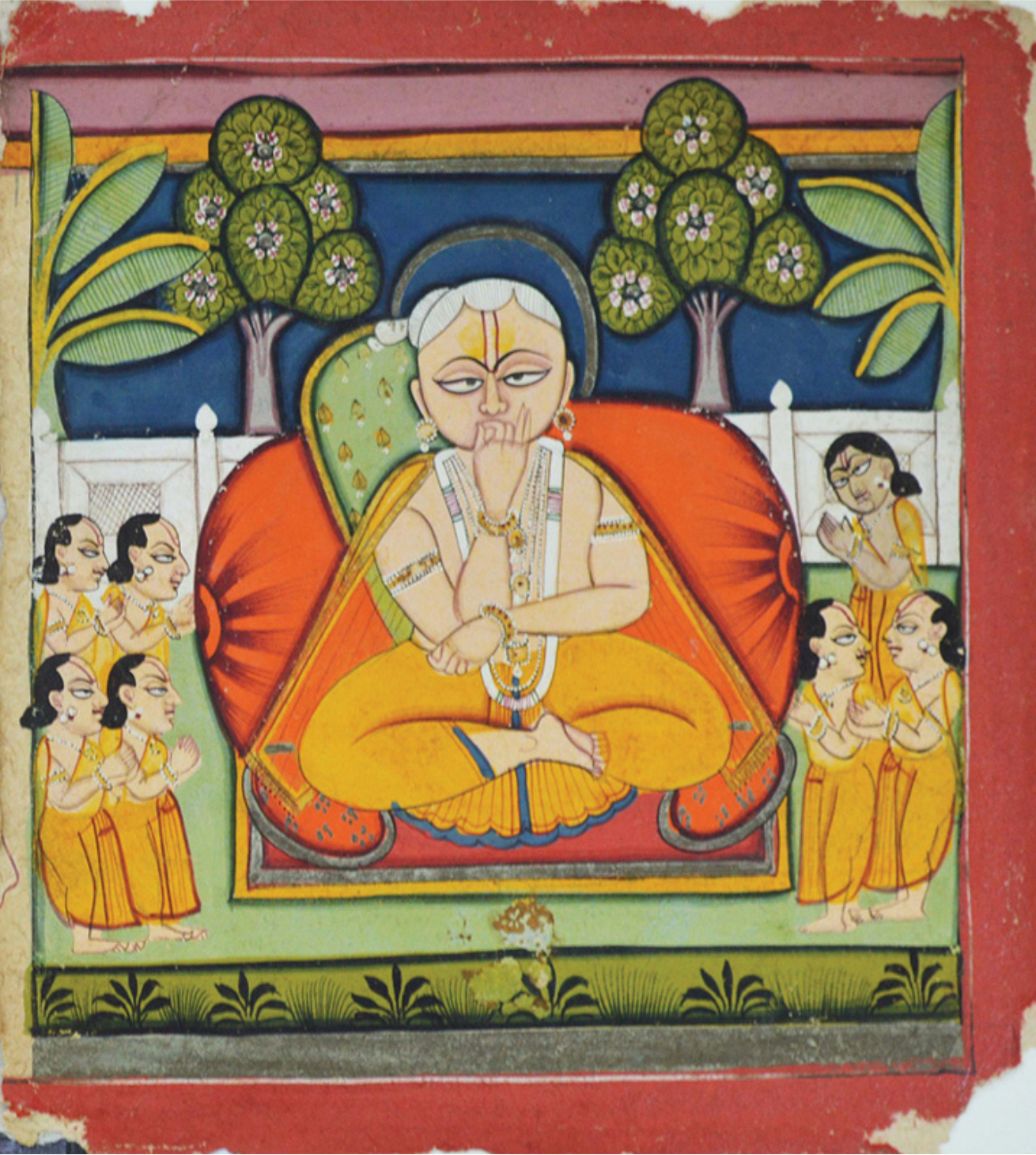
Painting of Viṭṭhalanātha and his seven sons, (c. 1750 CE)

In 1540, the Gauḍiya priests of Śrī Nāthajī, whom Vallabha hired, were expelled from Govardhan Hill which gave the Puṣṭimārga sole control over the deity's worship. In 1542, Gopīnātha died with his son soon dying as well, leaving Viṭṭhalanātha as the leader of the Puṣṭimārga. From 1543 to 1581 Viṭṭhalanātha went on fundraising tours to Gujarat where he converted many merchants, agriculturalists, and artisans. He also successfully obtained the royal Hindu and Mughal patronage for the sect. He heavily transformed the simple sevā of his father's time into a deeply aesthetic experience that sought to recreate the daily life of Kr̥ṣṇa in which he was offered expensive clothing, jewelry, perfumes, and sumptuous meals. The arts of paintings and poetry were also added to the rituals to enhance their appeal. Upon Viṭṭhalanātha's death the spiritual leadership of the sect was divided among his seven sons among whom he had distributed the major svarūpas of Kr̥ṣṇa and granted the sole right to bestow the brahmasambandha mantra, that is, to initiate new members. Thus, the Puṣṭimārga was divided into Seven Houses (Sāt Ghar) or Seven Seats (Sāt Gaddī), with all patrilineal male descendants of Vallabha having these rights. These descendants have the titles of mahārājā (Great King) or gosvāmi (Lord of Cows), and the chief mahārāja of the First House has the title of tilkāyat and is primus inter pares.

Since the division of guruship at the death of Vitthalanatha, the sampradaya has had no overall central authority. Leadership was divided among Vitthalanatha's seven sons as seven separate but equal centres, spiritual authority remaining confined to the male line of descent from Vallabhacharya, and each guru is the final authority among his own initiated followers. The eldest male-line descendants of the seven sons enjoy an enhanced status as custodians of the most revered svarupas; among them, the descendant of Giridhara, the eldest son, holds the greatest spiritual status as custodian of the original Shrinathji svarupa at Nathdwara, which attracts pilgrims from all centres of the sampradaya.

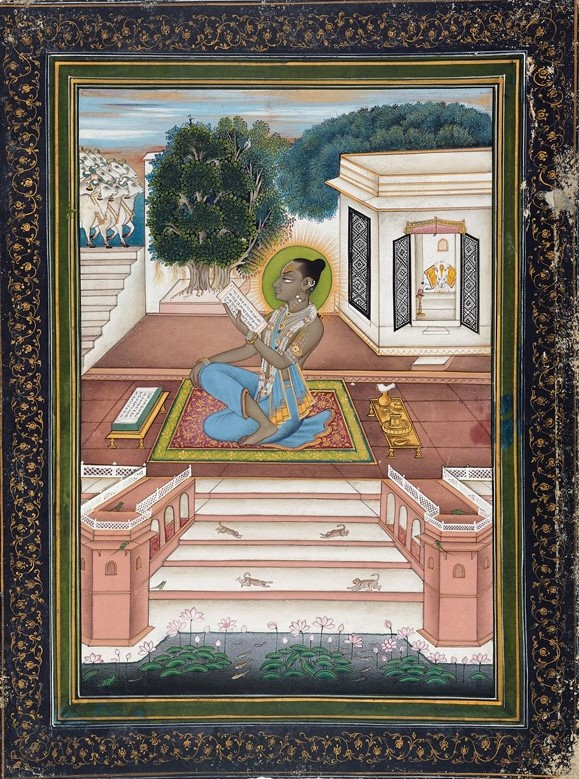
19th century depiction of Gokulanātha

=== Later history in Braj ===
Viṭṭhalanātha's sons continued obtaining patronage of the sect from Mughal emperors. Viṭṭhalanātha's son Gokulanātha authored many texts in Sanskrit and particularly in Braj Bhasha, which reemphasized the themes of Vallabha's works in a more accessible language. Gokulanātha is considered the most prominent Puṣṭimārga figure of the era, and according to sectarian sources he defended the sect's right to wear their sectarian tilaks and mala beads made from tulsi from a Shaiva-Tantric ascetic named Jadrup who exerted significant influence over the Mughal emperor Jahangir.

In the early 1600s, the houses had a dispute over the rights to perform worship to Śrī Nāthajī, and Jahangir sided with Tilkāyat Viṭṭhalarāy that the First House held precedence over the others. The Third and Sixth Houses were also in conflict through the century over the worship of the deity Bālakr̥ṣṇa, resulting the exodus of both Houses from Braj to Gujarat. The Third House eventually moved to the region of Mewar in Rajasthan where they were welcomed by the kings and granted refuge. In Braj, the Jāṭ rebellion under the reign of Emperor Aurangzeb caused many religious communities, including the remaining houses of the Puṣṭimārga, to flee to Rajasthan where they received protection. The First House, who was the custodian of Śrī Nāthajī, settled in a village in Mewar that would become Nāthadvārā.

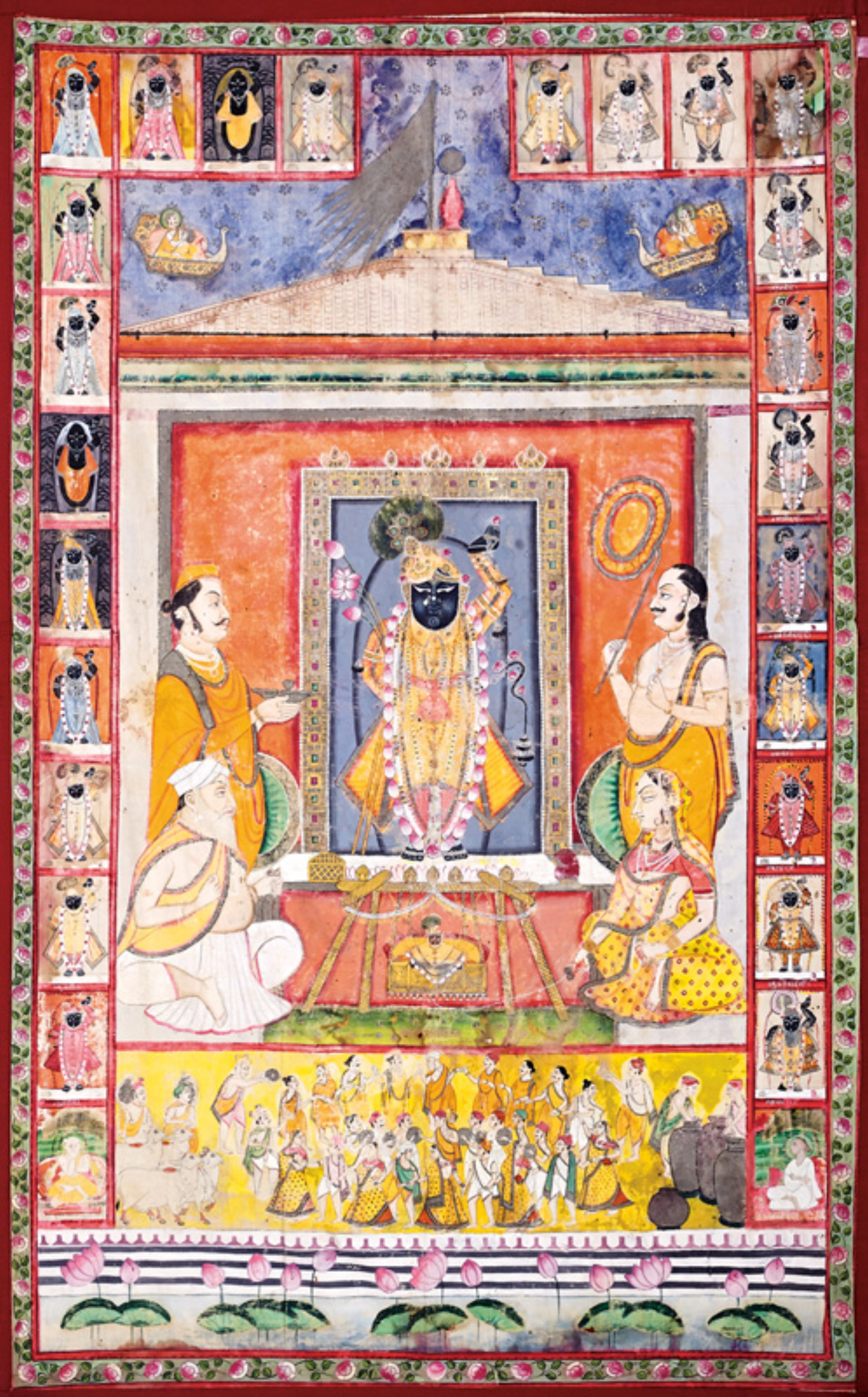
Nandmahotsava pichvai from c. 1900 with āratī performed by Govardhanalāl.

=== The Puṣṭimārga in Rajasthan ===
From their arrival in Rajasthan in the late 17th century to the late 19th century, Puṣṭimārga gosvāmīs served both as the gurus and jāgīrdārs of the Mewar darbār. The Mewar kingdom, which had defied the Mughal empire, sought to promote an image of themselves as protectors of Hindu dharma through their pre-existing theological commitment to and patronage of the Puṣṭimārga; in addition they sought to boost their economy through the pilgrimage traffic of the mercantile Gujarati Vaiṣṇava devotees. The Puṣṭimārga gosvāmīs in turn enjoyed the religious and financial support of the Mewar kingdom. The mahārājas became wealthy landowners who received state protection and privileges through their noble Rajput contacts and donations from Gujarati merchant devotees/

=== 19th century ===
The 1862 Maharaj Libel Case, in which a mahārājā from Surat named Jadunath Brizratanji sued the journalist Karsandas Mulji on charges of libel in the Supreme Court of Bombay, was widely publicized. In the paper Satya Prakāśa, Mulji had called the Vallabha Sampradāya a degenerate sect with false doctrines, and accused its mahārājās (including Jadunath Brizratanji specifically by name) of forcing female devotees to have sexual relations with them. The British judges sided with Mulji, and the Puṣṭimārga's reputation was tainted, and the sect was viewed negatively by Western scholars until the late 20th century.

The tenure of Tilakāyat Govardhanalāl (tilkāyat from 1876 to 1934) is often described as the "golden age" of both Nathdwara and the Puṣṭimārga.

=== 20th and 21st centuries ===
In the 20th century, the Pushtimarg prospered due to the acquired affluence of some of its members, primarily Gujarati merchants. The Gujarati diaspora founded important Pushtimarg centers in the United States, Canada, the United Kingdom, Australia, and New Zealand.

In the 21st century, the sect is not very well known in India. Since the latter half of the 20th century, the mahārājās no longer have the same level of religious and secular authority over their followers, and they are much more restrained in their public presence. While devotee families include those of great wealth, they do not draw attention to themselves either. The Puṣṭimārga does not actively seek converts in modern times.

== Key Tenets ==
=== Śuddhādvaita ===
According to Vallabha, the society of his time was ridden with ills such as bloodshed, barbarians, foreigners, the departing of gods from temples, an impure Ganges river, the presence of heterodox communities, ineffective religious rites, the disappearance of the caste system, and the prevalence of greed, hypocrisy, and impurity. In response, Vallabha formulated the philosophy of Śuddhādvaita, in opposition to the Ādvaita Vedānta of Śaṅkara, which he called Maryādā Mārga or Path of Limitations. Vallabha rejected the concept of Māyā, stating that the world was a manifestation of the Supreme Absolute and could not be tainted, nor could it change. According to Vallabha, Brahman consists of existence (sat), consciousness (cit), and bliss (ānanda), and manifests completely as Kr̥ṣṇa himself. In this philosophy, Kr̥ṣṇa, as Brahman, is considered the supreme and sole being, and that Brahma, Śiva, and Viṣṇu are his limited avatāras.

Vallabha states if someone forgets this truth about Kr̥ṣṇa and his nature, it is due to ignorance derived from material attachments. For certain individuals however this ignorance can be removed through divine grace (puṣṭi) that would move one to a path of devotion where one would rely on Kr̥ṣṇa's grace alone. Such people are admitted into the Path of Grace or Puṣṭimārga.

The purpose of this tradition is to perform sevā (selfless service) out of love for Kr̥ṣṇa. According to Saha, Vallabha stated that through single minded religiosity, a devotee would achieve awareness that there is nothing in the world that is not Kr̥ṣṇa. According to Barz, in Śuddhādvaita the concept of uddhāra or lifting a jīva out of ignorance is granted solely through the grace of Kr̥ṣṇa who may have seemingly unknowable reasoning. He further states that in Śuddhādvaita philosophy uddhāra may be granted to any jīva regardless of sectarian membership in the Puṣṭimārga or conduction of sevā, rather it is granted solely through Kr̥ṣṇa's independent will.

Vallabha stated that religious disciplines that focus on Vedic sacrifices, temple rituals, puja, meditation, and yoga had limited value. The school rejects the ascetic lifestyle and instead cherishes the householder lifestyle, wherein followers see themselves as participants and companions of Kr̥ṣṇa, and their daily life as an ongoing raslila.

=== Texts ===
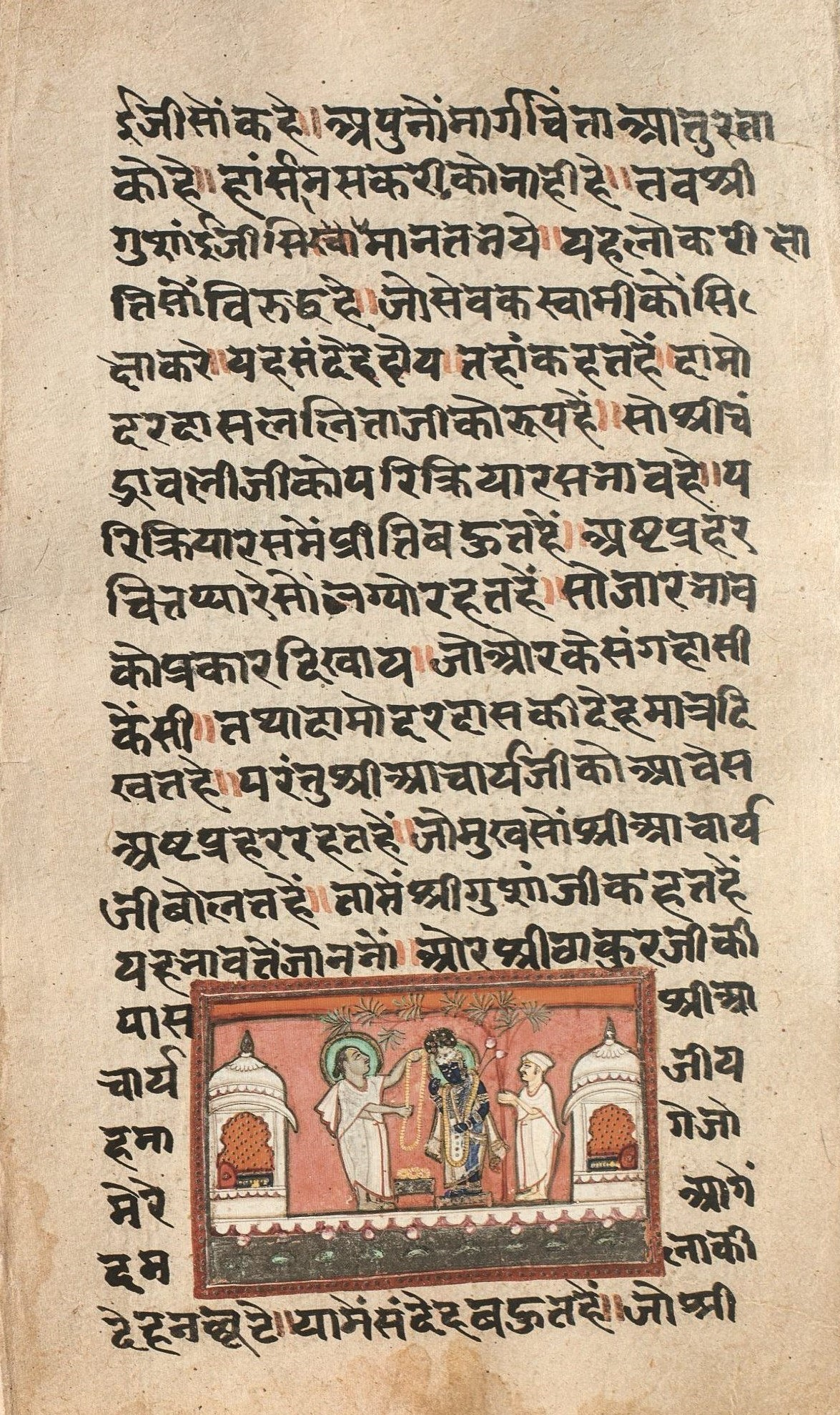
Illustrated 1702 manuscript of Caurāsī Vaiṣṇavana kī Vārtā. Painting dates to early 19th century.

Vallabha accepts four prior works as the major bases for his doctrines: the Vedas, the Bhagavad Gītā, the Brahma Sūtra, and the Bhāgavata Purāṇa. However, in practice the Vedas are not studied, whereas the Bhagavad Gītā and Bhāgavata Purāṇa are. Vallabha composed many philosophical and devotional books during his lifetime including:

1. Subhodinī, a partial commentary on the Bhāgavata Purāṇa
2. Aṇubhāṣya, a partial commentary on the Brahmasūtra of Bādarāyaṇa
3. Tattvārthadīpanibandha, a text interpreting existing Hindu scriptures through Vallabha's philosophy of Śuddhādvaita
4. Tattvārthadīpanibandhaprakāśa, a commentary on the Tattvārthadīpanibandha
5. Ṣoḍaśagrantha, sixteen treatises on the important facets of Śuddhādvaita and theology of the Puṣṭimārga

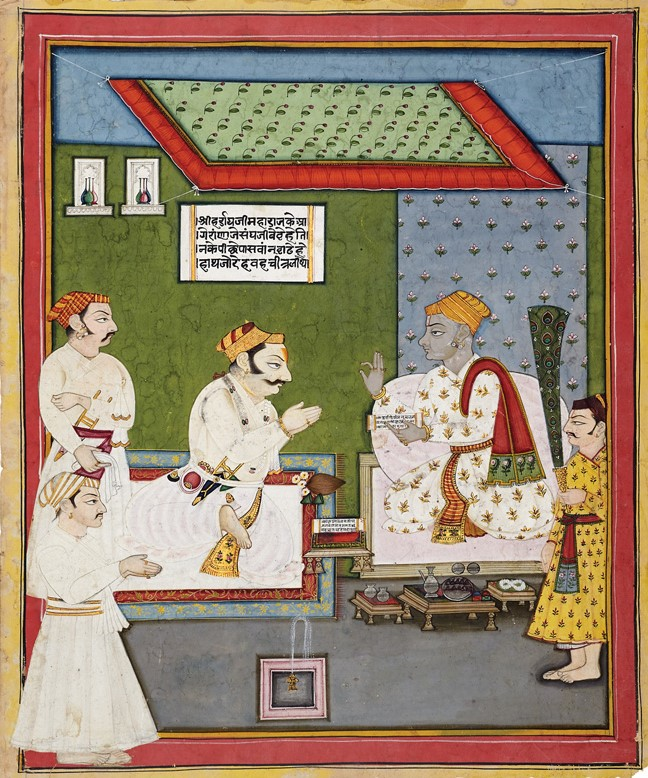
19th century depiction of an imagined meeting between Harirāya and Jai Singh of Mewar

Later figures authored prose texts in Braj Bhasha in the vārtā genre. The progenitor of the vārtā tradition was Vallabha's grandson, Gokulnāth, and Gokulnāth's grandnephew, Harirāy (1590–1715). The prose vārtās served as hagiographies about Vallabha, Viṭṭhalanātha, and their disciples, that could educate everyday devotees in Puṣṭimārga doctrine.

In terms of volume, Harirāy has the greatest literary output of the sect. There are hundreds of Sanskrit and Braj Bhasha prose works attributed to him, and over a thousand Braj Bhasha poems under various pen names. Pauwels and Bachrach compare Harirāy to Vyāsa of the Puranic tradition, to whom texts are by default attributed.

The Caurāsī Vaiṣṇavan kī Vārtā (the most notable vārtā text) details the accounts of 84 Vaiṣṇava devotees of the Puṣṭimārga who were disciples of Vallabhācārya. Complementing the text is the Do Sau Bāvan Vaiṣṇavan kī Vārtā by the same authors detailing the lives of 252 disciples of Viṭṭhalanātha. Gokulnāth is credited as the original collector of these accounts but they were likely not written down but rather collections of his discourses. His grandnephew Harirāy is credited as the final editor of the two texts. The Caurāsī Vaiṣṇavan kī Vārtā exists in two recensions, one without commentary and one with commentary written by Harirāy. The version with commentary is called the Tīn Janma kī Līlā and generally contains more episodes but is more concise than the version without commentary. The Do Sau Bāvan Vaiṣṇavan kī Vārtā was more likely composed by Harirāy's disciples and was completed at the end of the 17th century.

Harirāy is also the attributed author of the Braj Bhasha text Śrī Nāthajī Prākaṭya kī Vārtā which recounts the history of Śrīnāthajī from the svarūpa's appearance on Govardhan Hill until its removal to Nathadwara in 1672. Harirāy's authorship of this text is doubted, and the current text may only date to the 19th century. The Nijavārta and Śrī Ācāryajī ke Prākaṭya Vārta describe the life of Vallabha, while the Baiṭhaka Caritra describes Vallabha's travels around India. All three are dated to the 19th century. The Bhāvasindhu recounts information about the followers of Vallabha and Viṭṭhalanātha, while Viṭṭhalanātha has his own Nijavārta and Baiṭhaka Caritra.

Another important text is the Vallabhākhyān, a Gujarati poem by Gopāḷdās (a devotee of Viṭṭhalanātha) composed before 1577 that praises the family of Vallabha, and was one of the earliest texts to establish the divinity of Vallabha, Viṭṭhalanātha, and their descendants.

== Practices ==
=== Brahmsambandha and Initiation ===
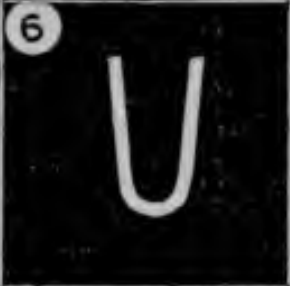
Vallabhachari tilak design that would be worn on the forehead

The formal initiation into the Pushtimarg is through the administration of the Brahmasambandha mantra. The absolute and exclusive rights to grant this mantra, in order to remove the doṣas (faults) of a jīva (soul) lie only with the direct male descendants of Vallabhācārya. According to Vallabha, he received the Brahmasambandha mantra from Kr̥ṣṇa one night in Gokula. The next morning, Vallabha administered the mantra to Damodaradāsa Harasānī, who would become the first member of the sampradāya.

In Vallabhācārya's time, an (adult) devotee to-be would ask Vallabha to admit him, and if Vallabha was willing to take the potential devotee, he would ask him to bathe and return. Vallabha would then administer the mantra, asking the devotee to use Kr̥ṣṇa's name and to devotee everything he had to Kr̥ṣṇa, after which Vallabha would begin the spiritual education on doctrines and texts.

In modern times, the majority of members of the sect are born into Pushtimarg families, with the administration of the mantra split into two ceremonies.

The first ceremony is known as śaraṇa mantropadeśa (or traditionally as nāma lenā and kaṇṭhī lenā). This occurs in the initiate's infancy or at any age if requested. The guru has the initiate repeat the aṣṭākṣara mantra ("śrī Kṛṣṇaḥ śaraṇaṃ mama") 3 times. The initiate is then given a kaṇṭhī made of tulasi.

The second ceremony is known as Brahma-sambandha (a state of union with Kṛṣṇa). This usually occurs before the initiate is married or as soon as they are considered mature enough to understand the significance of the ceremony. The initiate is made to fast the day prior, bathe, hold a tulasi leaf in the palm of the right hand and repeat the Ātmanivedana-mantra mantra (Note: The mantra is as follows: "सहस्रपरिवत्सरमितकालजातकृष्णवियोगजनिततापक्लेशानन्दतिरोभावोऽहं भगवते कृष्णाय देहेन्द्रियप्राणान्तःकरणानि तद्धर्मांश्च दारागारपुत्राप्तिवित्तेहापराणि आत्मना सह समर्पयामि दासोऽहं कृष्ण तवास्मि । (IAST: Sahasraparivatsaramitakālajātakṛṣṇaviyogajanitatāpakleśānandatirobhāvo'haṃ bhagavate kṛṣṇāya dehendriyaprāṇāntaḥkaraṇāni taddharmāṃśca dārāgāraputrāptivittehāparāṇi ātmanā saha samarpayāmi dāso'haṃ kṛṣṇa tavāsmi ।)" Part of this mantra has its origins in the Bhagavata Purana Canto 9 chapter 4 verse 65. Arney (2007) gives its English translation as follows: "For thousands of years and countless eons I have been lost in pain, grief, and sorrow caused by separation from Krishna. Together with my wife, home, children, elders, and all assets in this world and the next, I dedicate the functions of my body, senses, life, and soul to the Almighty, Lord Krishna. O Krishna, I am your servant!") after the guru. After this, the initiate places the tulasi leaf at the feet of the image of Kṛṣṇa. After this he or she is considered a proper member of the sampradāya. The mantra and initiation may only be performed by the direct male descendants of Vallabha.

=== Houses and Svarūpas in the Puṣṭimārga ===
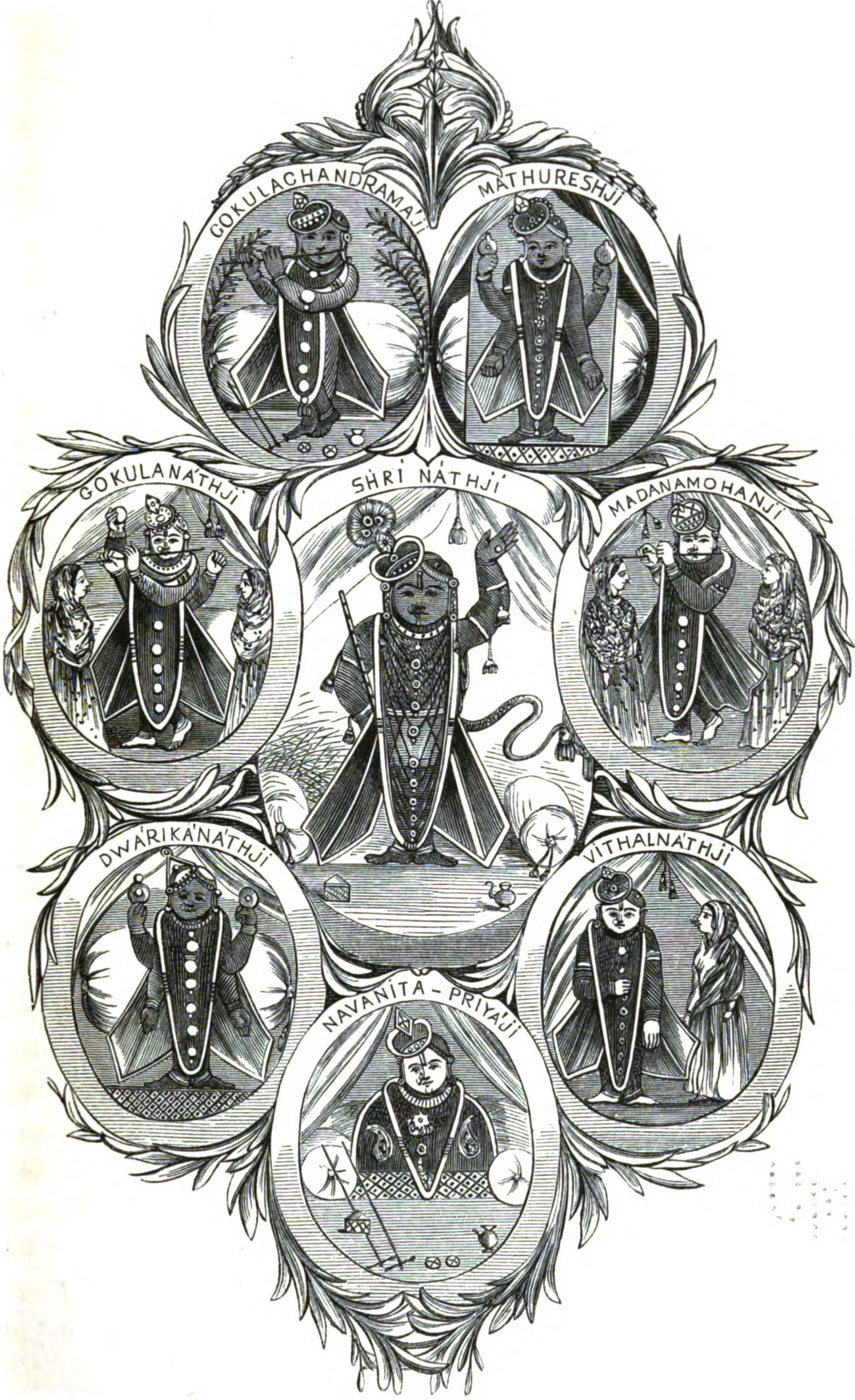
19th century print of almost all major svarūpas (missing Bālakr̥ṣṇa)

Viṭṭhalanātha had seven sons among whom he distributed nine major svarūpas of Kr̥ṣṇa that are worshipped by the Puṣṭimārga. Each son founded a lineage that served as leaders of each house or seat of the sampradāya. The sons of Viṭṭhalanātha, the svarūpas, and where they currently reside are:

1. Giridhara, whose descendants hold Śrī Nāthajī (Nāthadvāra, Rajasthan), Navanītapriya (Nāthadvāra, Rajasthan), and Mathureśa (Koṭā, Rajasthan)
2. Govindarāya, whose descendants hold Viṭṭhalanātha (Nāthadvāra, Rajasthan)
3. Bālakr̥ṣṇa, who descendants hold Dvārakānātha (Kāṁkarolī, Rajasthan)
4. Gokulanātha, whose descendants hold Gokulanātha (Gokula, Uttar Pradesh)
5. Raghunātha, whose descendants hold Gokulacandramā (Kāmabana, Rajasthan)
6. Yadunātha, whose descendants hold Bālakr̥ṣṇa (Sūrata, Gujarat) (Note: There is a succession dispute among the descendants of Yadunātha over the primacy of their svarūpas.)
7. Ghanaśyāma, whose descendants hold Madanamohana (Kāmabana, Rajasthan)

The nine svarūpas listed in Puṣṭimārga theology are considered svayambhu (self-born), sevya-svarūpa (having been offered sevā by Vallabha and Viṭṭhalanātha), and nava-nīdhi (nine receptacles of treasure).

The eldest gosvāmi of the First House (descendants of Giridhara) holds the title of tilakāyat, and is the custodian of Śrī Nāthajī. The tilakāyat is considered the highest authority in the Puṣṭimārga.

==== Other svarūpas and the eighth house ====
Yadunātha's descendants also hold Kalyāṇarāi (Baroda, Gujarat) and Mukundarāya (Vārāṇasī, Uttar Pradesh).

The eighth house was founded by Tulasīdāsa, also known as Lālajī, whose descendants hold Gopinātha (Br̥ndābana, Uttar Pradesh, until 1947 in Ḍerāgāzīkhāṁ, Sindh). Tulasīdāsa was an adopted son of Viṭṭhalanātha, and the svarūpa in his descendants' possession is less significant than the other svarūpas.

=== Sevā ===
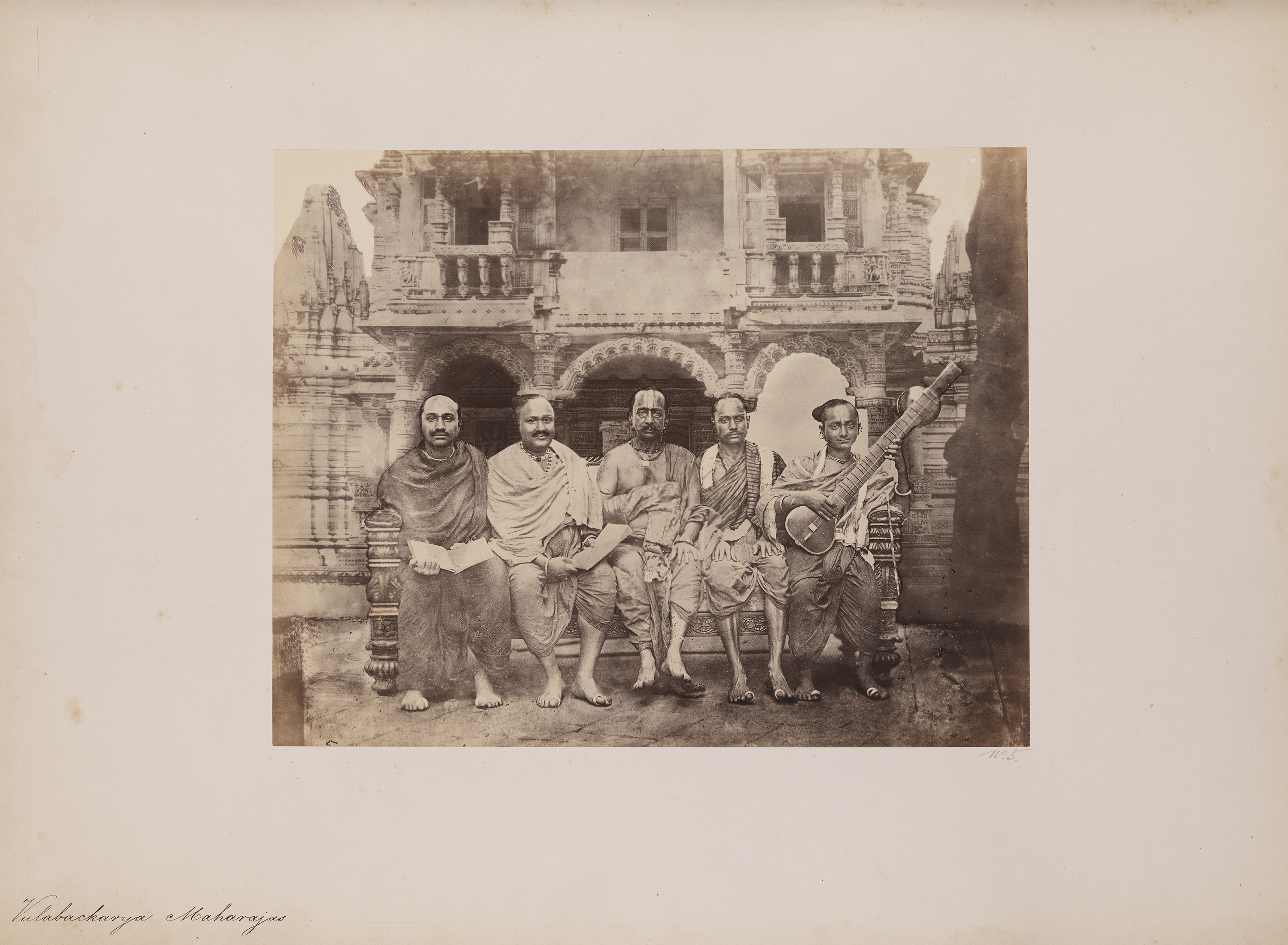
19th century photograph of a group of Vallabhacharya maharajas

The daily sevā and darśana periods are meant to portray a day in the life of Kr̥ṣṇa Gopāla, or Kr̥ṣṇa as Cow-protector. In the Pushtimarg, sevā is the unselfish worship of a svarūpa, under the doctrine that the svarūpa is sentient and appreciates refined food, clothing, and the arts. The themes of the sevā are based on the līlās (pastimes or play) of Kr̥ṣṇa as depicted in the Bhāgavata Purāṇa. Based on the līlā, appropriate pure and high quality food and clothing are offered to the svarūpa. The svarūpa is entertained by singers and poets, with paintings called pichvaīs being placed in the background to enhance the bhāva ("emotion") of the sevā.

Through sevā, members of the sampradāya are meant to experience bhāva in order to understand the rasa (essence) of Kr̥ṣṇa's līlās, through which a devotee experiences unselfish love for Kr̥ṣṇa. Sevā occurs privately in the home, but communal sevā in a haveli is also an important aspect. According to Barz, in the Puṣṭimārga, the icons of Kr̥ṣṇa are installed not in temples (mandir) but in mansions (havelī). Ho disagrees and states the temples have always been called mandirs, not havelis. Each mandir/havelī is considered to be the private dwelling of Kr̥ṣṇa and entrance is only granted at appointed darśana times.

==== Daily Darśanas ====
1. Maṅgalā, the awakening of the svarūpa in the morning and serving of light breakfast
2. Śr̥ṅgāra, the adorning of appropriate attire for the day
3. Gvāla, the grazing of cows in pasture
4. Rājabhoga, the eating of the main meal of the day, with the svarūpa being put to sleep afterwards
5. Utthāpana, the awakening from the afternoon nap
6. Bhoga, the eating of the light afternoon dinner
7. Sandhyārati, the evening worship with lighted lamps
8. Śayana, the putting to sleep of the svarūpa and closing of the havelī

==== Bhāva ====
There are four main types of bhāva: dāsya, sakhya, madhura, and most importantly vātsalya. Vātsalya bhāva treats Kr̥ṣṇa as if he were a child and the devotee is his caring mother or father. Specifically, devotees aim to model Yashoda, imparting tender love and concern to Kr̥ṣṇa. This bhāva manifests in acts of sevā through providing toys and blankets, and cooling Kr̥ṣṇa's meals before serving them. Madhura bhāva places the devotee in the role of a gopī (cowherd-girl of Braj) who takes part in the love-play of Kr̥ṣṇa's līlās in the nighttime. Sakhya bhāva places the devotee in the role of gopa (cowherd) as a friend of Kr̥ṣṇa's who takes part in games and cow herding activities in the daytime. Dāsya bhāva treats the devotee as a humble servant of Kr̥ṣṇa as a king who praises his master while demeaning himself. This bhāva has less presence in the Puṣṭimārga as Vallabha put a greater emphasis on the personal and emotional relationship on the first three bhāvas.

=== Emphasis on Householder Life ===
The Pushtimarg tradition is characterized by a strong emphasis on the householder lifestyle (gṛhastha) and generally regards traditional practices of ascetic renunciation unfavorably. This philosophical stance is derived from interpretations of the teachings of the tradition’s founder, Vallabhacharya (1479–1531), particularly the instruction encapsulated in the verse gṛhe sthitvā svadharmataḥ ("remain a householder and follow one’s own dharma"). This teaching requires that the devotee remain within the social network of their family whenever possible, rather than living removed from the social world. Consequently, the philosophical system is viewed as a means to help devotees balance religious obligations with worldly life, affirming that one cannot simply renounce all life duties. This ethos is intrinsically linked to the Pushtimarg’s focus on the domestic worship of Kr̥ṣṇa icons (svarūps).

==== Theological Basis ====
The theological justification for rejecting asceticism is detailed in Vallabhacharya’s treatise Saṃnyāsanirṇaya ("A Decision on Renunciation"). The text describes an episode involving a disciple named Narhar Sannyasi, who attempted to follow a path of renunciation through extreme austerities. Vallabhacharya corrected him, teaching that in the current degenerate age (Kali Yuga), traditional forms of renunciation can lead to pride and egotism rather than genuine devotion.

Modern hereditary leaders of the sect continue to reinforce this stance; the female leader Goswami Indirabetiji (d. 2016) stated that while marriage itself is not strictly required by scripture, "what is required is that the Vaishnava does not renounce the world."

However, scholars such as John Stratton Hawley have noted that Vallabhacharya himself was much more ambivalent about the value of householdership than his later followers. In his writings, Vallabhacharya had openly acknowledged the difficulties that a householder’s life places onto the path of pure devotion. Moreover, near the end of his life, Vallabhacharya himself had renounced the householder's life and its material attachments. Hawley suggests that the sharp anti-renunciation stance was amplified by the tradition only after Vallabhacharya’s death, likely to ensure the continuance of a lineage of male heirs (the Vallabha Kula) who could lead the denomination and secure its wealth.

=== Pilgrimage ===
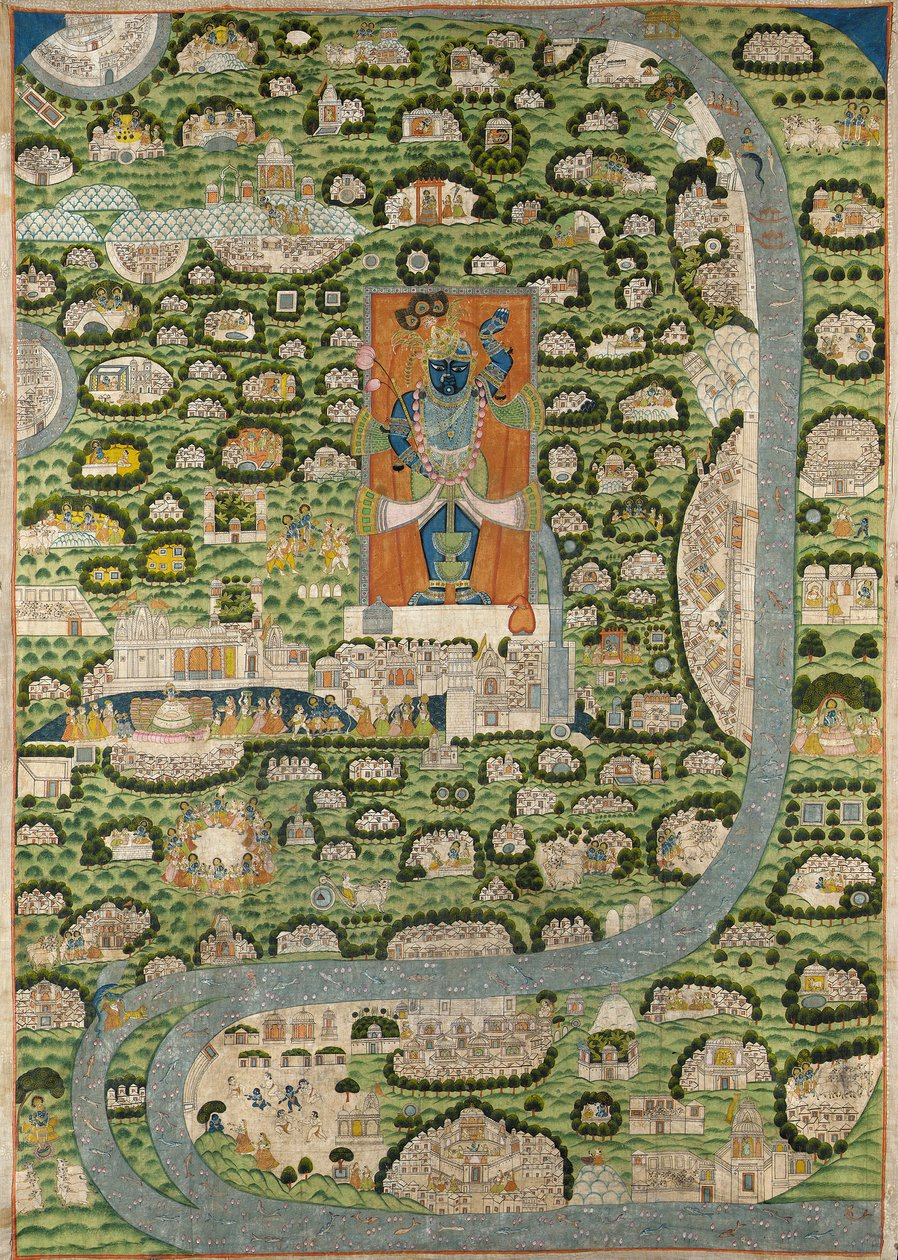
19th century painting map of the Vraj Parikrama pilgrimage

Baithak, literally "seat", is a site where a prominent Puṣṭimārga figure had taken a seat. These sites are spread across India but they are chiefly concentrated in Braj region in Uttar Pradesh and in western state of Gujarat. There are many Baithaks that are considered sacred; 84 connected to Vallabha, 28 to Viṭṭhalanātha, 4 to Giridhara, 13 to Gokulanātha, 1 each to Raghunātha and Ghanaśyāma, 7 to Harirāya, 2 to Dāmodaradāsa Harasānī, and 2 to Śrī Nāthajī. There also exist 10 caraṇa caukīs or pedestals on which Śrī Nāthajī was placed when being taken from Govardhana to Nathdwara.

Members of the Puṣṭimārga participate in the largest circumambulation of the Braj region called the baṛī yātrā. The pilgrimage lasts between six to seven weeks with several thousand participants and is led by a Maharaj. The pilgrimage starts in Mathura, and then travels to Jatipura (Govardhan), Kaman, Vrindavan, Barsana, Gokul, and other towns. The pilgrims are accompanied by pilgrimage priests called Chaubes.

=== Festivals ===
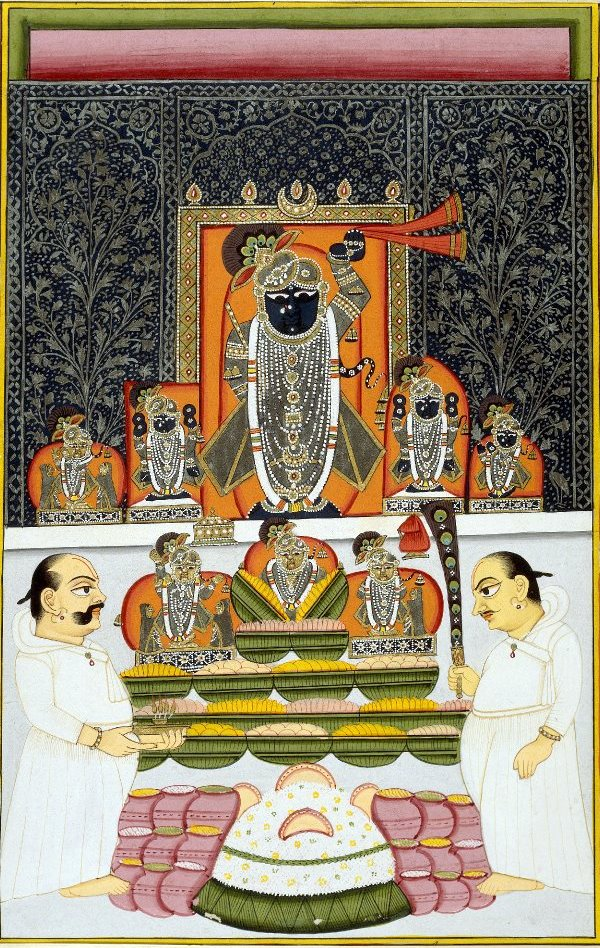
Gouache painting on paper from Nathdwara representing the autumn Annakuta Festival. This annual festival is observed by donating a mountain of food, usually rice, to the temple to symbolise the moment Kr̥ṣṇa lifted Mount Govardhan to protect his villagers. In Nathdwara the food is then given to the Bhils, the tribal peoples living in Mewar. The left arm of the god Srinathji, a form of Kr̥ṣṇa, is raised and the murti (idol) is positioned in front of a picchvai decorated with a stylised floral pattern. Two priests attend the god, positioned on either side of the offering.

In the Puṣṭimārga, several festivals are celebrated including Holī, Kr̥ṣṇa Janmāṣṭamī, Nāgapañcamī, and Annakūṭa. On festival days, the sevā is designed to match the bhāva of the holiday.

=== Music ===
Music plays a key role in sevā in the form of kīrtans. The aṣṭachāp, or group of eight poets who composed Braj Bhasha devotional poetry (kīrtans) are revered in the sect. According to sectarian sources, the eight poets were Kumbhanadāsa, Sūradāsa, Nandadāsa, Paramānandadāsa, Kr̥ṣṇadāsa, Caturbhujadāsa, Govindasvāmī, and Chītasvāmī. The most famous of the eight is Sūradāsa, whose relationship with the Puṣṭimārga is most tenuous, and some of the other members also had historically unclear relations to the sect.

In modern times, the musical liturgy contains nearly ten thousand padas by thirty to forty poets including the aṣṭachāp. The kīrtans are categorized into five major groups: Nitya (daily), Utsav (festival), Baddhāī (good wishes [used for birthdays]), Malhār (rainy season), and Dhamār (spring).

In Gujarat, lay devotees sing songs in the dhoḷ tradition. The dhoḷ originated as form of non-sectarian Gujarati folk song that later became identified with Vaishnavism as well as the Vallabhite sect in particular. In modern times, Mallison observed that only among the Vallabhans is the dhoḷ likely to survive. They are sung only by lay Gujarati devotees, particularly women, and are not part of the formal temple Braj liturgy. The authors of dhoḷs are generally not well known in literary circles except for Dayārām.

=== Society ===
==== Geographical Distribution ====
The Puṣṭimārga has the general reputation of having most of its followers in Gujarat, Rajasthan, and Mumbai. However, the sect also has a large presence in Delhi, Madhya Pradesh, and Uttar Pradesh. Prior to the Partition of India, there were also followers in Sindh and (West) Punjab who have since migrated to Delhi, Gujarat, and Maharashtra. The region of Braj is theologically the most important region and the homeland of the sect. There also exist outposts of the sect in eastern India, namely Varanasi and Champaranya. There is no presence of the sect in South India.

==== Caste Demography ====
The followers in Gujarat usually belong to the Bhatia, Lohana, Bania, Marwari, Kanbi/Patidar Patel (elite sections), and higher artisan castes (e.g. Soni, Kansara, Kayasth), almost all of whom reside in urban areas. There are only a small number of Gujarati Brahmins, mainly Shastris, who study and expound upon sectarian texts and perform specialized rituals. In sectarian temples, the Mukhiyas (chief priests), cooks, and water-carriers are all Brahmins from a handful of subcastes (Audichya, Girnara, and Sachora). According to Shah these Brahmins are initiated into the sect. However, it has been observed that many hired Brahmin sevaks in havelis are only nominally followers of the Puṣṭimārga and actually follow other local traditions. That said, the sect's hereditary religious leaders (Goswamis) and their families are Brahmins.

== Sources ==
=== Books ===
- Arney, Paul (2007). "The Bade Shikshapatra: A Vallabhite Guide to the Worship of Krishna's Divine Images". In Bryant, Edwin F. (ed.). Krishna: A Sourcebook (PDF). Oxford University Press.
- Bachrach, Emilia (2022). Religious Reading and Everyday Lives in Devotional Hinduism. Oxford University Press. ISBN 978-0-19-764859-9.
- Barz, Richard Keith (1992). The Bhakti Sect of Vallabhācārya (3rd ed.). New Delhi, India: Manoharlal Publishers Pvt Ltd.
- Barz, R.K. (1994). "The Caurāsī Vaiṣṇavan kī Vārtā and the Hagiography of the Puṣṭimārg". In Callewaert, Winand M.; Snell, Rupert (eds.). According to Tradition: Hagiographical Writing in India. Harrassowitz Verlag.
- Barz, Richard (2018). "Vallabha Sampradāya/Puṣṭimārga". In Jacobsen, Knut A.; Basu, Helene; Malinar, Angelika; Narayanan, Vasudha (eds.). Brill's Encyclopedia of Hinduism Online. Brill.
- Bennett, Peter John (1990). "In Nanda Baba's House: The Devotional Experience in Pushti Marg Temples". In Lynch, Owen M. (ed.). Divine Passions. Berkeley: University of California Press. pp. 182–205.
- Bennett, Peter John (1993). The Path of Grace: Social Organisation and Temple Worship in a Vaishnava Sect. Delhi, India: Hindustan Publishing Corporation. ISBN 978-81-7075-024-6.
- Bhatt, Govindlal Hargovind (2001) [1953]. "The School of Vallabha". In Bhattacharya, Haridas (ed.). The Cultural Heritage of India: Volume III - The Philosophies (PDF). Ramakrishna Mission Institute of Calcutta.
- Bryant, Edwin F. (18 June 2007). Krishna: A Sourcebook. New York: Oxford University Press. ISBN 978-0-19-972431-4.
- Doniger, Wendy (1999). Merriam-Webster's Encyclopedia of World Religions. Merriam-Webster. p. 781. ISBN 978-0-87779-044-0.
- Entwistle, Allan W. (1987). Braj: Centre of Krishna Pilgrimage. Groningen: Forsten. ISBN 978-90-69-80016-5.
- Growse, Frederic Salmon (1882). Mathura a District Memoir (Reprint (1979) ed.). New Delhi, India: J. Jetley.
- Harirāya, Shri (1972). 41 [i.e. Ikatālīsa] baṛe śikshāpatra: mūḷa śloka, ślokārtha, evaṃ vyākhyā sahita (in Hindi). Śrī Vaishṇava Mitra Maṇḍala.
- Jindel, Rajendra (1976). Culture of a Sacred Town: A Sociological Study of Nathdwara. Popular Prakashan. pp. 21–22, 34, 37. ISBN 978-8-17154-0402.
- Jones, Constance; Ryan, James D. (2006). Encyclopedia of Hinduism. Infobase. ISBN 978-0-8160-7564-5.
- Kim, Hanna H. (2016). "Review of Richardson, E. Allen, Seeing Krishna in America: The Hindu Bhakti Tradition of Vallabhacharya in India and Its Movement to the West". H-Asia, H-Review.
- Lochtefeld, James G. (2002). The Illustrated Encyclopedia of Hinduism. New York: The Rosen Publ. Group. ISBN 0-8239-3180-3.
- Mallison, Francoise (1994). "Early Kr̥ṣṇa Bhakti in Gujarat: The Evidence of Old Gujarati Texts Recently Brought to Light". In Entwistle, Alan W.; Mallison, Francoise (eds.). Studies in South Asian Devotional Literature: Research Papers 1981-1991. Paris: École Française d'Extrême-Orient. ISBN 978-81-7304-095-5.
- Pocock, D.F. (1973). Mind, Body, and Wealth: A Study of Belief and Practice in an Indian Village. Basil Blackwell. ISBN 978-0-631-15000-8.
- Richardson, E. Allen (2014). Seeing Krishna in America: the Hindu Bhakti tradition of Vallabhacharya in India and its movement to the West. Jefferson, North Carolina: McFarland & Company, Inc., Publishers. ISBN 978-0-7864-5973-5.
- Shukla, Chandrashankar Pranshankar (1947). Mandir Pravesh Ane Shastro (1st ed.). Ahmedabad: Navjivan Prakashan Mandir.
- Upādhyāya, Baladevajī (1993). "Puṣtimārgake Siddhānta Aura Unakā Udgamasthāna". In Poddar, Hanumanprasad (ed.). Kalyāṇa: Vedānta Āṃka (in Hindi). Gorakhpur: Gitapress. pp. 259–260.

=== Theses/Journals ===
- Bachrach, Emilia (2014). Reading the Medieval in the Modern: The Living Tradition of Hagiography in the Vallabh Sect of Contemporary Gujarat (PhD thesis). The University of Texas at Austin.
- Bennett, Peter John (1983). Temple Organisation and Worship Among the Puṣṭimārgīya Vaiṣṇavas of Ujjain (PDF) (PhD thesis). University of London. p. 129-134.
- Desai, Ankur Vijay (2011). Visions of Grace: Svarūpa Imagery and Veneration in the Puṣṭimārga Sampradāya (Master of Arts thesis). The Ohio State University. p. 45-46.
- Entwistle, Allan W. (1982). The Rāsa Māna ke Pada of Kevalarāma: A Medieval Hindi Text of the Eighth Gaddī of the Vallabha Sect (PhD thesis). University of London School of Oriental and African Studies.
- Gupta, Dīnadayālu (1970). Aṣṭachāpa aura Vallabha-Sampradāya (eka Gaveṣaṇātmaka Adhyayana) [Prayāga Virava-Vidyālaya kī Ḍī. Liṭ. Upādhi ke lie Svīkr̥ta Śodhagrantha] अष्टछाप और वल्लभ-सम्प्रदाय (एक गवेषणात्मक अध्ययन) [प्रयाग विरव-विद्यालय की डी० लिट्० उपाधि के लिए स्वीकृत शोधग्रन्थ] [The Eight Poets and the Vallabha sampradāya (An Explorative Study) [Approved Thesis for D. Litt. degree from Prayāga Virava-Vidyālaya]] (Thesis) (in Hindi) (2nd ed.). Hindī Sāhitya Sammelan. p. 1.
- Ho, Meilo (2006). The Liturgical Music of the Puṣṭi Mārg of India: An Embryonic Form of the Classical Tradition (Phd thesis). University of California Los Angeles. p. 197-205.
- Mallison, Françoise (1986). "Les chants dhoḷa au gujarāt et leur usage pour la dévotion vallabhite". Bulletin de l'École Française d'Extrême-Orient (in French). 75: 79–103. doi:10.3406/befeo.1986.1701.
- Mallison, Françoise (1996). Shah, J.B.; Kansara, N.M. (eds.). "Puṣṭimārgī Poetry in Gujarati: The Lord of Braj Travelled to Gujarat Twice". Sambodhi. 20. Ahmedabad: Lalbhai Dalpatbhai Institute of Indology: 24–31.
- Pauwels, Heidi; Bachrach, Emilia (July 2018). "Aurangzeb as Iconoclast? Vaishnava Accounts of the Krishna images' Exodus from Braj". Journal of the Royal Asiatic Society. Third Series. 28 (3). Cambridge University Press.
- Saha, Shandip (2004). Creating a Community of Grace: A History of the Puṣṭi Mārga in Northern and Western India (1493-1905) (PDF) (Thesis). University of Ottawa.
- Shah, A.M. (2006). "Sects and Hindu social structure". Contributions to Indian Sociology. 40 (2). SAGE Publications: 209–248. doi:10.1177/006996670604000203.
