= Fatehpur Sikri Lok Sabha constituency =

Lok Sabha Constituency in Uttar Pradesh, India

Coordinates: 27.1°N 77.67°E

Fatehpur Sikri UP-19
- Lok Sabha constituency
- Interactive Map Outlining Fatehpur Sikri Lok Sabha constituency

Constituency details
- Country: India
- Region: North India
- State: Uttar Pradesh
- Assembly constituencies: Agra Rural; Fatehpur Sikri; Kheragarh; Fatehabad; Bah
- Established: 2008-present
- Total electors: 17,98,836
- Reservation: None

Member of Parliament
- 18th Lok Sabha
- Incumbent Raj Kumar Chahar
- Party: BJP
- Alliance: NDA
- Elected year: 2024

Fatehpur Sikri Lok Sabha constituency (Hindi pronunciation: [ˈfətɛɦpʊɾ ˈsiːkɾiː]) is one of the 80 Lok Sabha (parliamentary) constituencies in the Indian state of Uttar Pradesh. This constituency in Agra district came into existence in 2008 as a part of the implementation of delimitation of parliamentary constituencies based on the recommendations of the Delimitation Commission of India constituted in 2002.

== Assembly segments ==
Presently, Fatehpur Sikri Lok Sabha constituency comprises five Vidhan Sabha (legislative assembly) segments. These are:

No	Name	District	Member	Party	2024 Lead
90	Agra Rural (SC)	Agra	Baby Rani Maurya	BJP	BJP
91	Fatehpur Sikri	Agra	Babulal Chaudhary	BJP	BJP
92	Kheragarh	Agra	Bhagvan Singh Kushwaha	BJP	INC
93	Fatehabad	Agra	Chotelal Verma	BJP	BJP
94	Bah	Agra	Rani Pakshalika Singh	BJP	INC

Kheragarh, Fatehabad and Bah assembly segments were earlier in erstwhile Firozabad Lok Sabha constituency, while Fatehpur Sikri assembly segment was earlier in erstwhile Agra Lok Sabha constituency.

== Members of Parliament ==
Year	Elected MP	Party
2009	Seema Upadhyay	Bahujan Samaj Party
2014	Choudhary Babulal	Bharatiya Janata Party
2019	Raj Kumar Chahar	Bharatiya Janata Party
2024	Raj Kumar Chahar	Bharatiya Janata Party

== Election results ==
=== General Election 2024 ===
2024 Indian general election: Fatehpur Sikri
Party	Candidate	Votes	%	±%
BJP	Rajkumar Chahar	445,657	43.09	▼21.23
INC	Ramnath Sikarwar	4,02,252	38.90	▲22.31
BSP	Ramniwas Sharma	1,20,539	11.66	▼4.54
Independent	Rameshwar Chaudhary	48,606	4.70	N/A
NOTA	None of the Above	7,793	0.75	▼0.28
Majority		43,405	4.20	▼43.53
Turnout		10,34,155	57.49	▼2.93
BJP hold		Swing		

=== 2019 ===
2019 Indian general elections: Fatehpur Sikri
Party	Candidate	Votes	%	±%
BJP	Rajkumar Chahar	667,147	64.32	
INC	Raj Babbar	1,72,082	16.59	
BSP	Shribhagwan Sharma	1,68,043	16.20	
NOTA	None of the Above	10,692	1.03	
Majority		4,95,065	47.73	
Turnout		10,38,460	60.42	
BJP hold		Swing		

=== 2014 results ===
2014 Indian general elections: Fatehpur Sikri
Party	Candidate	Votes	%	±%
BJP	Choudhary Babulal	426,589	44.06	+21.81
BSP	Seema Upadhyay	2,53,483	26.18	−4.01
SP	Rani Pakshalika Singh	2,13,397	22.04	+6.30
RLD	Amar Singh	24,185	2.50	+2.50
SSAD	Vijay Singh Kushwaha	5,223	0.54	+0.54
NOTA	None of the Above	2,677	0.28	+0.28
Majority		1,73,106	17.88	+16.44
Turnout		9,68,233	61.26	+9.70
BJP gain from BSP		Swing	+13.87	

=== 2009 results ===
2009 Indian general elections: Fatehpur Sikri
Party	Candidate	Votes	%	±%
BSP	Seema Upadhyay	209,466	30.19	
INC	Raj Babbar	1,99,530	28.75	
BJP	Raja Mahendra Aridaman Singh	1,54,373	22.25	
SP	Raghuraj Singh Shakya	1,09,240	15.74	
Independent	Sunder Singh	6,836	0.99	
Majority		9,936	1.44	
Turnout		6,93,904	51.56	
BSP win (new seat)				

== See also ==
- Agra district
- List of constituencies of the Lok Sabha
