= Chaudhary Badan Singh =

Indian politician and author (1925–2022)

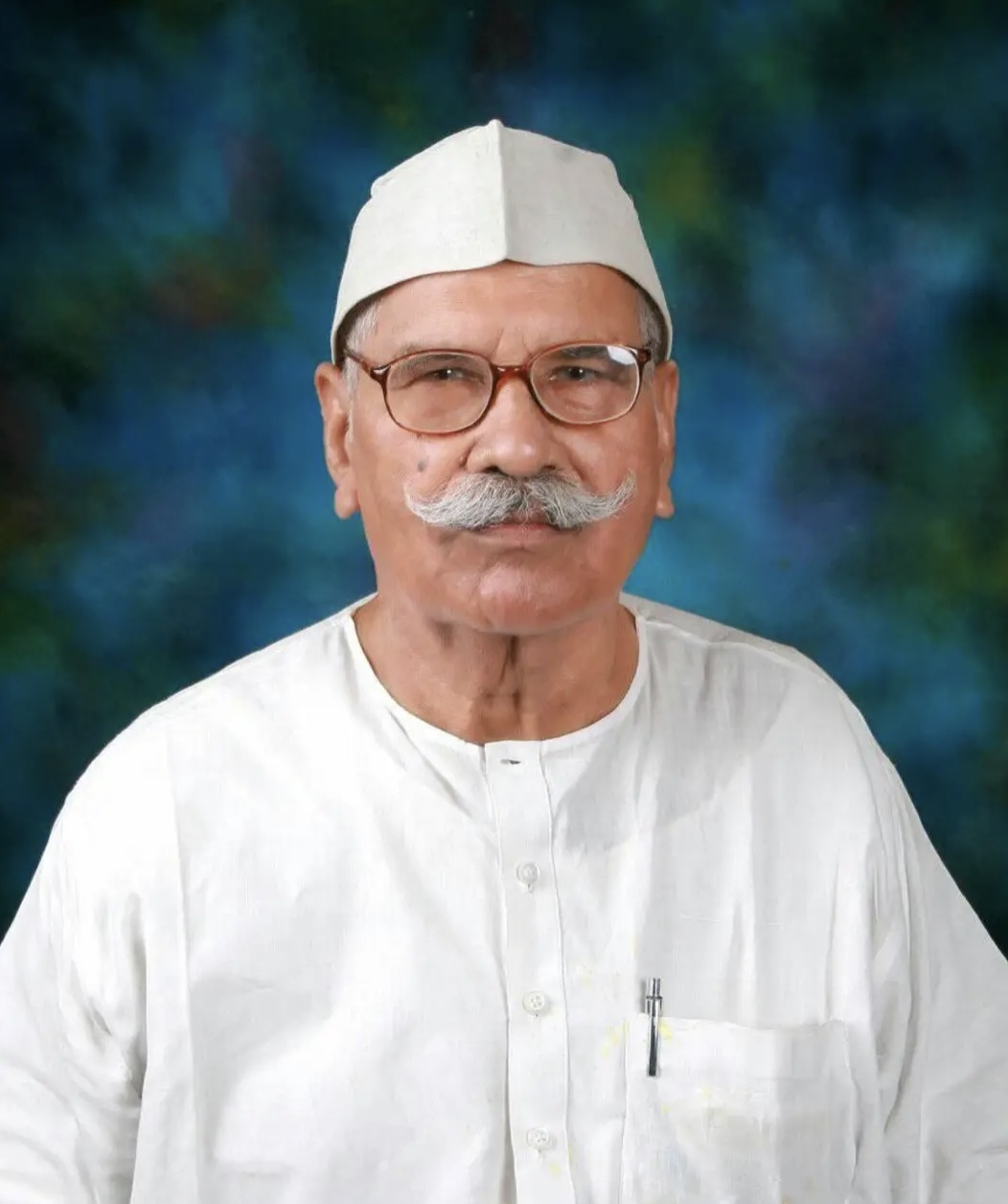

Member of the Uttar Pradesh Legislative Assembly
- In office 1977–1991, 1993–1995
- Constituency: Fatehpur Sikri, Uttar Pradesh

Personal details
- Born: 15 January 1925 Rithora, Kiraoli, Agra district, Uttar Pradesh
- Died: 1 December 2022 (aged 97)
- Party: Bharatiya Janata Party
- Other political affiliations: Janata Party, Lokdal, Janata Dal, Janata Party (Secular)
- Children: 6
- Profession: Politician and author

Chaudhary Badan Singh (15 January 1925 – 1 December 2022) was an Indian politician, independence activist, social activist and writer who served as a Member of the Uttar Pradesh Legislative Assembly (MLA) from the Fatehpur Sikri for five consecutive terms. Singh was known for his contributions to the Indian independence movement and his long political career spanning several decades. He was a disciple of Charan Singh, former prime minister of India and also known for his contribution to the Braj literature.

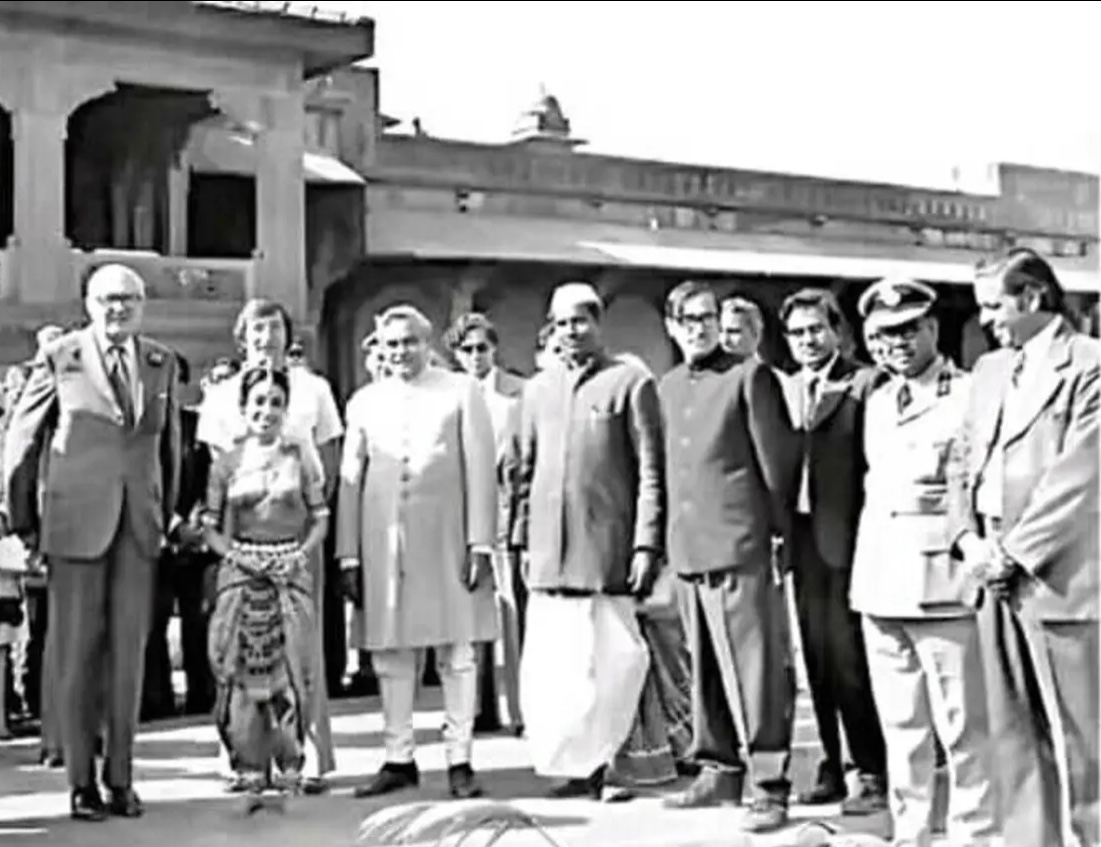
Ch. Badan Singh, Atal Bihari Vajpayee and James Callaghan in Fatehpursikri, 1977

== Early life ==
Singh was born on 15 January 1925 in Rithora, Fatehpur Sikri, Uttar Pradesh (United Provinces of Agra and Oudh). Singh pursued a Bachelor of Arts (BA) and a Licentiate in Teaching (LT). He worked as a teacher for 33 years at Chaharvati Inter College. His son, Dr. S.P. Singh, established Chaudhary Charan Singh Hospital in Fatehpur Sikri, contributing to healthcare services in the region.

== Recognition ==
Singh was widely regarded as the “Bhishma Pitamah” of Agra’s politics due to his long lasting impact. Singh was recognised for his contributions to the Braj literature, receiving the Braj Award in 2021 from Governor Anandiben Patel. He authored three books on Braj culture, highlighting his dedication to its preservation and promotion.

== Positions held ==
- 7th Vidhan Sabha (1977-1980): Elected as a member of the Janata Party in the post-Emergency elections.
- 8th Vidhan Sabha (1980-1985): Elected as a member of the Janata Party.
- 9th Vidhan Sabha (1985-1989): Elected as a member of the Lok Dal.
- 10th Vidhan Sabha (1989-1991): Elected as a member of the Janata Dal.
- 12th Vidhan Sabha (1993-1996): Elected as a member of the Bharatiya Janata Party.

== Death ==
Singh died on 1 December 2022 in Agra, Uttar Pradesh. He was cremated with state honours in his paternal village Rithora and received a ceremonial guard of honor.
