= Damodardas =

Damodardas may refer to:

- Narendra Damodardas Modi, Prime Minister of India since 2014
- Damodardas Harsani, Chronicles of the Eighty-Four Vaishnavas
