= Seema Upadhyay =

Indian politician

Member of Parliament, Lok Sabha
- In office 2009–2014
- Preceded by: Constituency Established
- Succeeded by: Choudhary Babulal
- Constituency: Fatehpur Sikri

Personal details
- Born: 4 September 1965 (age 60) Shastri Nagar, Meerut, Uttar Pradesh, India
- Other political affiliations: Bahujan Samaj Party
- Spouse: Ramveer Upadhyay (m. 1985)
- Children: 3

Seema Upadhayay is an Indian politician, belonging from the Bharatiya Janata Party. In the 2009 election she was elected to the Lok Sabha from Fatehpur Sikri constituency in Uttar Pradesh as a member of Bahujan Samaj Party.
