= Fatehpur Sikri Assembly constituency =

Constituency of the Uttar Pradesh legislative assembly in India

Fatehpur Sikri
- Constituency No. 91 for the Uttar Pradesh Legislative Assembly

Constituency details
- Country: India
- Region: North India
- State: Uttar Pradesh
- District: Agra
- Total electors: 3,57,817 (2022)
- Reservation: None

Member of Legislative Assembly
- 18th Uttar Pradesh Legislative Assembly
- Incumbent Babulal Chaudhary
- Party: Bharatiya Janata Party
- Elected year: 2022

Fatehpur Sikri Assembly constituency (Hindi pronunciation: [ˈfətɛɦpʊɾ ˈsiːkɾiː]) is one of the 403 constituencies of the Uttar Pradesh Legislative Assembly, India. It is a part of the Agra district and one of the five assembly constituencies in the Fatehpur Sikri Lok Sabha constituency. First election in this assembly constituency was held in 1957 after the "DPACO (1956)" (delimitation order) was passed in 1956. After the "Delimitation of Parliamentary and Assembly Constituencies Order" was passed in 2008, the constituency was assigned identification number 91.

== Members of the Legislative Assembly ==
#	Term	Name	Party	From	To	Days	Comments	Ref
Constituency not in existence
01	02nd Vidhan Sabha	Swami Visheshwaranand	Praja Socialist Party	Apr-1957	Mar-1962	1,800	-	
02	03rd Vidhan Sabha	Champawati	Indian National Congress	Mar-1962	Mar-1967	1,828	-	
03	04th Vidhan Sabha	R. Singh	Bharatiya Jana Sangh	Mar-1967	Apr-1968	402	-	
04	05th Vidhan Sabha	Raghunath Singh	Bharatiya Kranti Dal	Feb-1969	Mar-1974	1,832	-	
05	06th Vidhan Sabha	Champawati	Indian National Congress	Mar-1974	Apr-1977	1,153	-	
06	07th Vidhan Sabha	Badan Singh	Janata Party	Jun-1977	Feb-1980	969	-	
07	08th Vidhan Sabha	Badan Singh	Janata Party (Secular)	Jun-1980	Mar-1985	1,735	-	
08	09th Vidhan Sabha	Badan Singh	Lok Dal	Mar-1985	Nov-1989	1,725	-	
09	10th Vidhan Sabha	Badan Singh	Janata Dal	Dec-1989	Apr-1991	488	-	
10	11th Vidhan Sabha	Ummed Singh	Bharatiya Janata Party	Jun-1991	Dec-1992	533	-	
11	12th Vidhan Sabha	Badan Singh	Bharatiya Janata Party	Dec-1993	Oct-1995	693	-	
12	13th Vidhan Sabha	Babulal Chaudhary	Independent	Oct-1996	May-2002	1,967	-	
13	14th Vidhan Sabha	Babulal Chaudhary	Rashtriya Lok Dal	Feb-2002	May-2007	1,902	-	
14	15th Vidhan Sabha	Surajpal Singh	Apna Dal	May-2007	Mar-2012	1,762	-	
15	16th Vidhan Sabha	Surajpal Singh	Bahujan Samaj Party	March 2012	March 2017	1,829	-	
16	17th Vidhan Sabha	Chaudhary Udaybhan Singh	Bharatiya Janata Party	March 2017	Mar-2022	3534		
17	18th Vidhan Sabha	Babulal Chaudhary	Bharatiya Janata Party	Mar-2022	Incumbent	-		

== Election results ==
=== 2027 ===
2027 Uttar Pradesh Legislative Assembly election: Fatehpur Sikri
Party	Candidate	Votes	%	±%
NDA				
INC	Mukesh Dagur			
BSP				
NOTA	None of the above			
Majority				
Turnout				
gain from		Swing		

=== 2022 ===
2022 Uttar Pradesh Legislative Assembly election: Fatehpur Sikri
Party	Candidate	Votes	%	±%
BJP	Babulal Chaudhary	112,095	46.14	▼1.2
RLD	Brijesh Kumar Chahar	64,826	26.69	▲9.99
BSP	Mukesh Kumar	59,641	24.55	▲0.03
NOTA	None of the above	1,620	0.67	▼0.15
Majority		47,269	19.45	▼3.37
Turnout		242,922	67.67	▼0.14
BJP hold		Swing		

=== 2017 ===
2017 Assembly Elections: Fatehpur Sikri
Party	Candidate	Votes	%	±%
BJP	Chaudhary Udaybhan Singh	108,586	47.34	
BSP	Surajpal Singh	56,249	24.52	
RLD	Brijesh Kumar Chahar	38,307	16.7	
SP	Lal Singh	21,884	9.54	
NOTA	None of the above	1,864	0.82	
Majority		52,337	22.82	
Turnout		229,371	67.81	
BJP gain from BSP		Swing	▲14.64	

=== 2012 ===
2012 Assembly Elections: Fatehpur Sikri
Party	Candidate	Votes	%	±%
BSP	Surajpal Singh	67,191	33.09	Steady
Independent	Raj Kumar Chahar	61,568	30.32	Steady
RLD	Babulal Chaudhary	34,330	16.91	Steady
JaKP	Om prakash	15,503	7.63	Steady
BJP	Jitendra Fauzdar	6,927	3.41	Steady
SP	Dr Satya prakash	4,633	2.28	Steady
PECP	Ajaz Ahmad	3,372	1.66	Steady
RSMD	Madhusudan Sharma	2,836	1.40	Steady
	Remainder 8 candidates	6,706	3.30	Steady
Majority		5,623	2.77	Steady
Turnout		2,03,064	66.13	Steady
BSP gain from AD(K)		Swing		

== See also ==
- Agra district
- Fatehpur Sikri Lok Sabha constituency
- Sixteenth Legislative Assembly of Uttar Pradesh
- Uttar Pradesh Legislative Assembly
- Vidhan Bhawan
