= Braj literature =

Genre of northern Indian literature

Braj literature is literature in Braj Bhasha, one of the Western Hindi languages developed as a literary language during the 15th century, Bhakti Movement as a form of devotional songs in praise of Krishna. It is often mystical in nature, related to the spiritual union of people with God, because almost all of Braj poets were considered God-realised saints and their words are thus considered as emanating from a divine source. Much of the traditional Northern Indian literature shares this trait. It literary tradition is a celebration of Krishna. The Braj region has a rich legacy and the medium was mainly the literary vehicle for the poets viz. Surdas, Tulsidas, Acharya Ram Chandra Shukla, Raskhan, Amir Khusrau among others.

== History ==
Braj Bhasha gained wider literary popularity because of Krishnaism, poet compose poems that were revolve around of childhood playful and profound instances, called as Leela of their favoured lords and life in region of Vraja.

== Literary works in Braj Bhasha ==
Some major literary works in Braj Bhasha are:

- Yugala Shataka by Swami Sri Sribhatta Devacarya; known as the first 'Vani' book in Vraja Bhasha composed in the 14th century AD as a part of Nimbarka Sampradaya tradition of Radha Krishna worship.
- Vinaya Patrika by Tulsidas
- Sur Sagar by Surdas
- Buddha Charit by Acharya Ram Chandra Shukla
- Sufi poetry by Amir Khusro
- Eulogies by Kavi Bhushan
- Vrind Satsai by Vrind (1643 - 1723), court poet of ruler of Kishangarh
- Mahabharat Darpan by Gokulnath Kavi

== See also ==
- Braj Bhasha
