= Rajkumar Chahar =

Indian politician

Rajkumar chahar

Member of Parliament, Lok Sabha
- Incumbent
- Assumed office 23 May 2019
- Preceded by: Choudhary Babulal
- Constituency: Fatehpur Sikri, Uttar Pradesh

Personal details
- Born: 10 July 1967 (age 59) Kheragarh, Agra, Uttar Pradesh
- Party: Bharatiya Janata Party
- Spouse: Vijay Laxmi
- Children: Paramveer Chahar, Karamveer Chahar, Shoorveer Chahar, Arti Chahar,

Chahar (second from left) in 2019

Rajkumar Chahar (Hindi pronunciation: [ɾaːd͡ʒ.kʊmaːɾ t͡ʃaːɦəɾ]) is an Indian politician. He was elected to the Lok Sabha, lower house of the Parliament of India from Fatehpur Sikri, Uttar Pradesh in the 2019 Indian general election as member of the Bharatiya Janata Party. Chahar is from Jat community.
