= Braj Bhasha =

Indo-Aryan language

Braj
- Brij Bhasha
- ब्रजभाषा
- Native to: India
- Region: Braj
- Ethnicity: Brajwasi
- Native speakers: 1.56 million (2011 census); Census results conflate some speakers with Hindi.
- Language family: Indo-European: Indo-Iranian; Indo-Aryan; Central Indo-Aryan; Western Hindi; Braj
- Writing system: Devanagari

Language codes
- ISO 639-2: bra
- ISO 639-3: bra
- Glottolog: braj1242

Braj (Note: commonly called Braj Bhasha, also known as Vraj Bhasha or Brij Bhasha or Braj Boli) is a language within the Indo-Aryan language family spoken in the Braj region in western Uttar Pradesh centred on Mathura-Vrindavan, eastern Rajasthan centred on Bharatpur, Karauli, Deeg, and Dholpur, northern Madhya Pradesh centered on Morena, and southeastern Haryana centered on Palwal and Faridabad. It was one of the two predominant literary languages of North-Central India before gradually merging into and contributing to the development of standardized Hindi in the 19th century. It is spoken today in its unique form in many districts of western Uttar Pradesh, often referred to as 'Central Braj Bhasha'.

The language was historically used for Vaishnavite poetry dedicated to Krishna, whose life was associated with sites in the Braj region. There were also early prose works in terms of the hagiographical vārtā literature of the Vallabha sect.

Braj is considered by scholars to be a more conservative example of the Central Indo-Aryan languages compared to the Hindustani language, which has been influenced by Punjabi and intermediate dialects.

== Literature ==
Most Braj literature is of a mystical nature, related to the spiritual union of people with God, because almost all of the Braj Bhasha poets were considered God-realised saints and their words are thus considered as directly emanating from a divine source. Much of the traditional North Indian literature shares this trait. All traditional Punjabi literature is similarly written by saints and is of a metaphysical and philosophical nature.

Another peculiar feature of North Indian literature is that the literature is mostly written from a female point of view, even by male poets. This is because the saints were in a state of transcendental, spiritual love, where they were metaphorically women reuniting with their beloved. (In its inversion of the conventional genders of worshipper and worshippee, Maulana Da’ud's Chandayan departs from this tradition).

Important works in Braj Bhasha are:

- Pushtimargiya Kiratan of Ashtachhap.
- Yugala Shataka by Swami Sri Sribhatta Devacarya; known as the first 'Vani' book in Vraja Bhasha composed in the 14th century as a part of Nimbarka Sampradaya tradition of Radha-Krishna worship.
- Vinaya Patrika by Tulsidas
- Sur Sagar by Surdas
- Buddha Charit by Acharya Ramchandra Shukla
- Sufi poetry by Amir Khusro
- Eulogies by Kavi Bhushan
- Dasam Granth by Guru Gobind Singh
- Nayikabhed, Nakhshikh and Satasattak by Chhatrapati Sambhaji Maharaja.
- Vrind Satsai by Vrind (1643 - 1723), court poet of ruler of Kishangarh
- Caurāsī Vaiṣṇavan kī Vārtā by Gokulanātha, edited and compiled by Harirāy in the late 16th to early 17th century. An important Pushtimarg sacred biography of Vallabhācārya's exemplary devotees.
- Mahabharat Darpan by Gokul Nath Kavi, with his son Gopinath and his disciple Manidev finishing the last sections. The work was composed under the court patronage of Kingdom of Kashi, Maharaja Udit Narayan Singh in the late 18th to early 19th century. This is the first complete verse translation of the Mahabharata including the Harivamsa Purana in the literary Braj Bhasha.

== Phonology ==
Story of Camel and Jackal in Braj language

=== Consonants ===
Phonemes of Braj Bhasha
		Labial	Dental	Alveolar	Retroflex	Palatal	Velar	Glottal
Nasal		m		n				
Plosive/ Affricate	voiceless	p	t̪	ts	ʈ		k	
Plosive/ Affricate	voiceless aspirated	pʰ	t̪ʰ	tsʰ	ʈʰ		kʰ	
Plosive/ Affricate	voiced	b	d̪	dz	ɖ		ɡ	
Plosive/ Affricate	voiced aspirated	bʱ	d̪ʱ	dzʱ	ɖʱ		ɡʱ	
Fricative				s				ɦ
Flap				ɾ				
Approximant		ʋ		l		j		

== Geographical distribution ==
Braj Bhasha is spoken in the nebulous Braj region centred on Mathura, Agra, Aligarh, Hathras, Gautam Buddh Nagar, Bulandshahr in Uttar Pradesh and Bharatpur, Deeg, Karauli, and Dholpur in Rajasthan. It is the predominant language in the central stretch of the Ganges-Yamuna Doab.

In Rajasthan, it is spoken in the following districts:

- Bharatpur
- Deeg
- Karauli
- Dholpur

In Western Uttar Pradesh, it is spoken in the following districts:

- Mathura
- Hathras
- Farrukhabad
- Agra
- Aligarh
- Firozabad
- Mainpuri
- Etah
- Eastern parts of Etawah
- Southern parts of Budaun
- Parts of Bareilly
- Southern parts of Sambhal
- Southern parts of Gautam Buddh Nagar (areas of Jewar and Greater Noida)
- Southern parts of Bulandshahr (areas of Khurja, Shikarpur, Dibai and Aurangabad)

Some communities still speak Brajbhasha even near the southern part of Ghaziabad.

In Madhya Pradesh, it is spoken in the following districts:

- Morena
- Northern parts of Gwalior
- Eastern parts of Sheopur
- Western parts of Bhind

In Haryana, it is spoken in the following districts:

- Palwal
- Faridabad
- Eastern parts of Gurugram and Nuh

The area of South Delhi, which is connected to Faridabad, still has some communities that speak Brajbhasha.

== See also ==
- Hindi literature
- Brajavali dialect
- Brajabuli
- Awadhi language
