= Tikwapur =

Tikwapur Tivikrampur
- Village
- Nickname: Tikmapur
- Location in Uttar Pradesh, India Tikwapur (India)
- Coordinates: 26°00′0″N 80°0′0″E
- Country: India
- state: Uttar Pradesh
- District: Kanpur city

Government
  - Body: Gram Panchayat

Population
  - Total: 2,453

Languages
  - Official: Hindi
- Time zone: UTC+5:30 (IST)
- Postal code: 209206
- Vehicle registration: UP-78
- Nearest city: Kanpur

Tikwapur is an Indian village in Ghatampur tehsil of Kanpur district, Uttar Pradesh. It is also known by the name of Trivikrampur. Its corrupted name is Tikmapur.

== Geographical situation ==
It is situated in tehsil Ghatampur, district Kanpur of state Uttar Pradesh, India, on left bank of River Yamuna. Tikmapur village is 58 km from Kanpur and 2 km from Kanpur-Sagar National High Way towards west.

== Famous persons ==
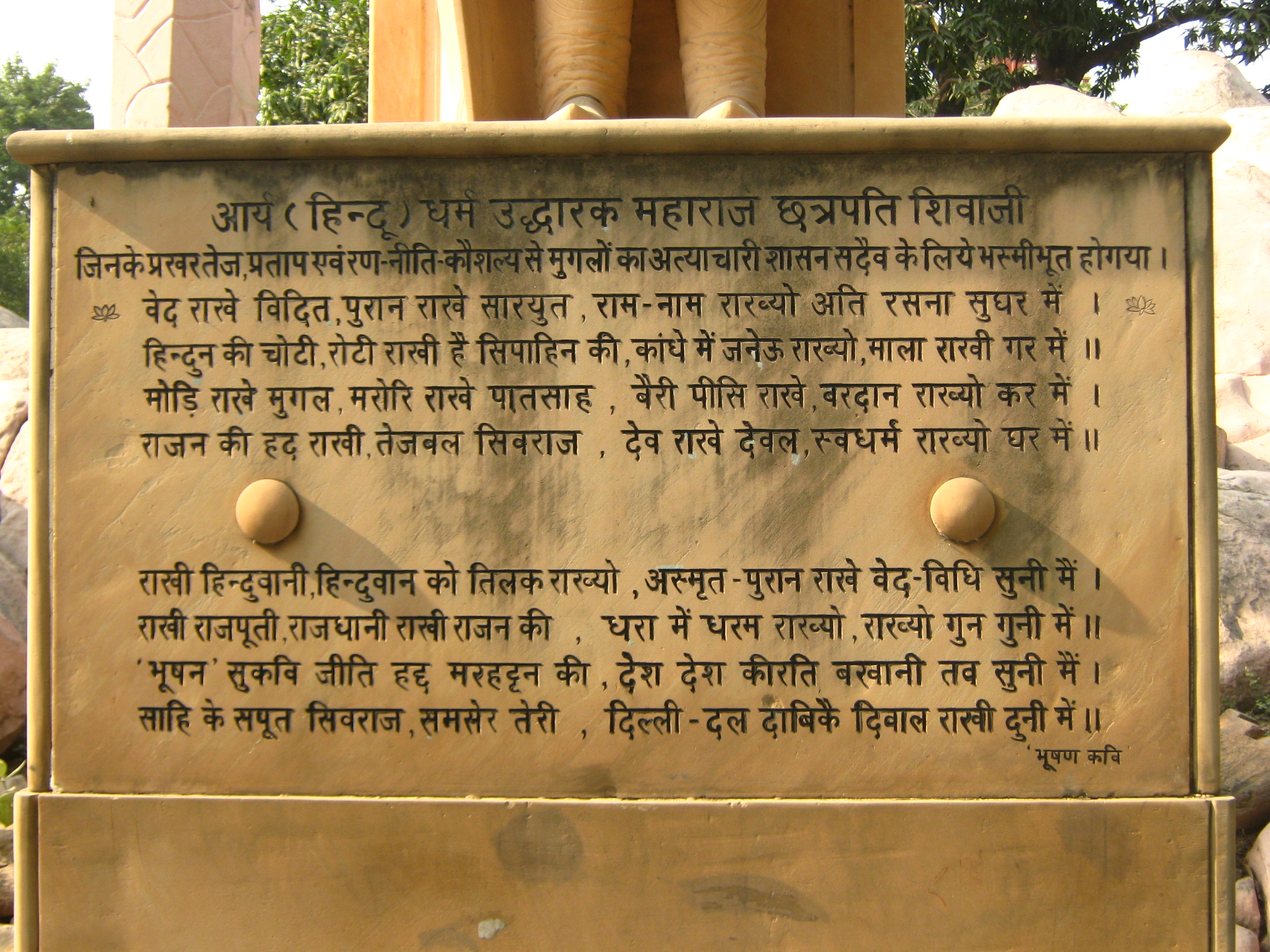
An inscription about one of Bhushan's poems about Shivaji, at the Birla Mandir, Delhi

- Kavi Bhushan, India's first national poet

== Historical Importance ==
Ratnakar Tripathi's family in the 17th century lived in this village. Three sons of Ratnakar Tripathi were famous for his poetry in medieval India:

- Kavi Bhushan
- Kavi Chintamani
- Matiram
