= Surajpal Singh =

Indian politician

MLA, Legislative Assembly of Uttar Pradesh
- In office March 2012 – March 2017
- Succeeded by: Chaudhary Udaybhan Singh
- In office May 2007 – March 2012
- Preceded by: Chaudhary Baboo Lal
- Constituency: Fatehpur Sikri

Personal details
- Born: 5 July 1960 (age 66) Agra district
- Party: Bahujan Samaj Party
- Other political affiliations: Apna Dal
- Spouse: Radha Devi (wife)
- Children: 3 sons & 1 daughter
- Parent: Pooran Singh (father)
- Education: Not available
- Profession: Farmer & politician

Surajpal Singh is an Indian politician and a member of the 16th Legislative Assembly of India. He represents the Fatehpur Sikri constituency of Uttar Pradesh and is a member of the Bahujan Samaj Party political party.

== Early life and education ==
Surajpal Singh was born in Agra district. He is educated till eighth grade and is a farmer by profession.

== Political career ==
Surajpal Singh has been a MLA for two terms. He represented the Fatehpur Sikri constituency and is a member of the Bahujan Samaj Party political party. Singh was earlier a member of Apna Dal political party.

He lost his seat in the 2017 Uttar Pradesh Assembly election to Chau Udaybhan Singh of the Bharatiya Janata Party.

== Posts held ==
#	From	To	Position	Comments
01	March 2012	March 2017	Member, 16th Legislative Assembly	
02	May 2007	March 2012	Member, 15th Legislative Assembly	

== See also ==
- Fatehpur Sikri (Assembly constituency)
- Sixteenth Legislative Assembly of Uttar Pradesh
- Uttar Pradesh Legislative Assembly
