= Chaudhary Udaybhan Singh =

Indian politician (born 1946)

Minister of State for Khadi and Villages Industries, Sericulture Industries, Textile, Micro, Small and Medium Enterprise, Export Promotion Government of Uttar Pradesh
- In office 2019–2022
- Chief Minister: Yogi Adityanath

MLA, 17th Legislative Assembly of Uttar Pradesh
- In office 2017–2022
- Preceded by: Surajpal Singh
- Constituency: Fatehpur Sikri, Agra

MLA, 12th Legislative Assembly of Uttar Pradesh
- In office December 1993 – October 1995
- Preceded by: Vijay Singh Rana
- Succeeded by: Seth Kishan Lal Baghel
- Constituency: Dayalbagh, Agra

Personal details
- Born: 31 December 1946 (age 79) Dhadhu Pura, Agra, Uttar Pradesh
- Party: Bharatiya Janata Party
- Spouse: Shanti Devi (m. 1966)
- Children: 5
- Parent: Nihal Singh
- Education: Agra University
- Occupation: MLA
- Profession: Politician

Chaudhary Udaybhan Singh (born 31 December 1946) is an Indian politician and a member of 12th and 17th Legislative Assembly of Uttar Pradesh of India. He represents the Fatehpur Sikri (Assembly constituency) in Agra district of Uttar Pradesh and is a member of the Bharatiya Janata Party. He is known best for his decision. Currently he is serving as Minister of State for Khadi and Villages Industries, Sericulture Industries, Textile, Micro, Small and Medium Enterprise, Export Promotion in Government of Uttar Pradesh.

== Early life and education ==
Chaudhary was born 31 December 1946 in Dhadhu Pura, Tajganj, Agra district of Uttar Pradesh to his father Than Singh and mother Kanchan Devi. His mother died a few moments later of his birth. Fufa Nihal Singh was a resident of village Mahrara, Sadabad, Mathura district. Nihal Singh was his religious father. He belongs to Jat community. In 1966, he married Shanti Devi, they have five sons. He had earned Master of Arts and Bachelor of Education degree in 1973 from Agra University.

== Political career ==
Chaudhary was member of Rashtriya Swayamsevak Sangh since 1964. Introduced into active politics in 1991 under the direction of Rashtriya Swayamsevak Sangh, in the Dayalbagh Assembly constituency in 1993, he received the distinction of winning the highest number of MLA votes in Agra district, receiving 57000 votes. In his twenty-month tenure as a Member of the Legislative Assembly he developed his constituency. During his legislative times, his party was extremely anti-government, due to which the administration and government could not get support in their efforts. Being an active worker of the Bharatiya Janata Party, he was sent as a party in charge in the Hastinapur by-election and won the BJP candidate's victory under his leadership, after this BJP district president of Agra district given to him. Under his leadership, elections were held for District Council, Municipal Corporation, Municipality and the party emerged with a significant power in Agra district.

Since 2016, he represents Fatehpur Sikri (Assembly Constituency) as a member of Bharatiya Janata Party. In 17th Legislative Assembly of Uttar Pradesh (2017), he defeated his nearest candidate Surajpal Singh (Bahujan Samaj Party) by a margin of 52,337 votes.

On 21 August 2019, after first cabinet expansion of Yogi Adityanath Government he was appointed Minister of State for Khadi and Villages Industries, Sericulture Industries, Textile, Micro, Small and Medium Enterprise, Export Promotion.

== Posts held ==
#	From	To	Position	Comments
1	December 1993	October 1995	Member, 12th Legislative Assembly of Uttar Pradesh	
2	March 2017	March 2022	Member, 17th Legislative Assembly of Uttar Pradesh	
3	August 2019	March 2022	Minister of State in Yogi Adityanath ministry	
