= Bah Assembly constituency =

Constituency of the Uttar Pradesh legislative assembly in India

Bah ( बाह)
- Constituency No. 94 for the Uttar Pradesh Legislative Assembly

Constituency details
- Country: India
- Region: North India
- State: Uttar Pradesh
- District: Agra
- Established: 1951
- Total electors: 306,414 (2012)
- Reservation: None

Member of Legislative Assembly
- 18th Uttar Pradesh Legislative Assembly
- Incumbent Rani Pakshalika Singh
- Party: Bharatiya Janata Party
- Elected year: 2022
- Preceded by: Raja Mahendra Aridaman Singh

Bah Assembly constituency is one of the 403 constituencies of the Uttar Pradesh Legislative Assembly, India. It is a part of the Agra district and one of the five assembly constituencies in the Fatehpur Sikri Lok Sabha constituency. The first election in this assembly constituency was held in 1952 after the "DPACO (1951)" (delimitation order) was passed in 1951. After the "Delimitation of Parliamentary and Assembly Constituencies Order" was passed in 2008, the constituency was assigned identification number 94.

== Wards / Areas ==
The extent of the Bah Assembly constituency is the Bah Tehsil.

== Members of the Legislative Assembly ==
From	Name	Party	Ref
1952	Shambhu Nath Chaturvedi	Indian National Congress	
1957	Mahendra Ripudaman Singh	Independent politician	
1962	Vidyawati	Indian National Congress	
1967	R. Das	Bharatiya Jana Sangh	
1969	Ram Charan	Swatantra Party	
1974	Mahendra Ripudaman Singh	Swatantra Party	
1977	Mahendra Ripudaman Singh	Janata Party	
1980	Mahendra Ripudaman Singh	Janata Party	
1985	Amar Chand	Indian National Congress	
1989	Raja Mahendra Aridaman Singh	Janata Dal	
1991	Raja Mahendra Aridaman Singh	Janata Dal	
1993	Raja Mahendra Aridaman Singh	Janata Dal	
1996	Raja Mahendra Aridaman Singh	Bharatiya Janata Party	
2002	Raja Mahendra Aridaman Singh	Bharatiya Janata Party	
2007	Madhusdan Sharma	Bahujan Samaj Party	
2012	Raja Mahendra Aridaman Singh	Samajwadi Party	
2017	Rani Pakshalika Singh	Bharatiya Janata Party	
2022	Rani Pakshalika Singh	Bharatiya Janata Party	

== Election results ==
=== 2027 ===
2027 Uttar Pradesh Legislative Assembly election: Bah
Party	Candidate	Votes	%	±%
INDIA				
NDA				
BSP				
NOTA	None of the above			
Majority				
Turnout				
gain from		Swing		

=== 2022 ===
2022 Uttar Pradesh Legislative Assembly election: Bah
Party	Candidate	Votes	%	±%
BJP	Rani Pakshalika Singh	78,360	41.16	▼0.63
SP	Madhusudan Sharma	54,125	28.43	▲4.11
BSP	Nitin Verma	50,618	26.59	▼3.2
NOTA	None of the above	1,837	0.96	▼0.2
Majority		24,235	12.73	▲0.73
Turnout		190,382	56.91	▼3.09
BJP hold		Swing		

=== 2017 ===
U. P. Legislative Assembly Election, 2017: Bah
Party	Candidate	Votes	%	±%
BJP	Rani Pakshalika Singh	80,567	41.79	
BSP	Madhusudan Sharma	57,427	29.79	
SP	Anshu Rani Nishad	46,885	24.32	
NOTA	None of the above	2,214	1.16	
Majority		23,140	12.0	
Turnout		192,786	60.0	
BJP gain from SP		Swing		

=== 2012 ===
U. P. Legislative Assembly Election, 2012: Bah
Party	Candidate	Votes	%	±%
SP	Raja Mahendra Aridaman Singh	99,379	54.07	
BSP	Madhusudan Sharma	72,908	39.67	
BJP	Akashdeep Tiwari	2,411	1.31	
INC	Amar Chandra	2,131	1.16	
IND.	Suresh Kumar	1,832	1.00	
Majority		26,471	14.40	
Turnout		1,83,807	59.99	
SP gain from BSP		Swing		

== See also ==
- Agra district
- Fatehpur Sikri Lok Sabha constituency
- Sixteenth Legislative Assembly of Uttar Pradesh
- Uttar Pradesh Legislative Assembly
- Vidhan Bhawan
