= Kheragarh Assembly constituency =

Constituency of the Uttar Pradesh legislative assembly in India

Kheragarh ( खेरागढ़ )
- Constituency No. 92 for the Uttar Pradesh Legislative Assembly

Constituency details
- Country: India
- Region: North India
- State: Uttar Pradesh
- District: Agra
- Established: 1951
- Total electors: 295,677 (2012)
- Reservation: None

Member of Legislative Assembly
- 18th Uttar Pradesh Legislative Assembly
- Incumbent Bhagvan Singh Kushwaha
- Party: Bharatiya Janata Party

Kheragarh Assembly constituency is one of the 403 constituencies of the Uttar Pradesh Legislative Assembly, India. It is a part of the Agra district and one of the five assembly constituencies in the Fatehpur Sikri Lok Sabha constituency. First election in this assembly constituency was held in 1952 after the "DPACO (1951)" (delimitation order) was passed in 1951. After the "Delimitation of Parliamentary and Assembly Constituencies Order" was passed in 2008, the constituency was assigned identification number 92.

== Wards / Areas ==
Extent of Kheragarh Assembly constituency is Kheragarh Tehsil.

== Members of the Legislative Assembly ==
#	Term	Name	Party	From	To	Days	Comments	Ref
01	01st Vidhan Sabha	Jagan Prasad Rawat	Indian National Congress	May-1952	Mar-1957	1,776	-	
02	02nd Vidhan Sabha	-	-	Apr-1957	Mar-1962	1,800	Constituency not in existence	
03	03rd Vidhan Sabha	Jagan Prasad Rawat	Indian National Congress	Mar-1962	Mar-1967	1,828	-	
04	04th Vidhan Sabha	Jagan Prasad Rawat	Indian National Congress	Mar-1967	Apr-1968	402	-	
05	05th Vidhan Sabha	Jagan Prasad Rawat	Indian National Congress	Feb-1969	Mar-1974	1,832	-	
06	06th Vidhan Sabha	Shiv Prasad	Indian National Congress (Organisation)	Mar-1974	Apr-1977	1,153	-	
07	07th Vidhan Sabha	Guru Dott Solanki	Janata Party	Jun-1977	Feb-1980	969	-	
08	08th Vidhan Sabha	Mandleshwar Singh	Indian National Congress (I)	Jun-1980	Mar-1985	1,735	-	
09	09th Vidhan Sabha	Bahadur Singh	Indian National Congress	Mar-1985	Nov-1989	1,725	-	
10	10th Vidhan Sabha	Mandleshwar Singh	Janata Dal	Dec-1989	Apr-1991	488	-	
11	11th Vidhan Sabha	Babu Lal Goyal	Bharatiya Janata Party	Jun-1991	Dec-1992	533	-	
12	12th Vidhan Sabha	Mandleshwar Singh	Indian National Congress	Dec-1993	Oct-1995	693	-	
13	13th Vidhan Sabha	Mandleshwar Singh	Indian National Congress	Oct-1996	May-2002	1,967	-	
14	14th Vidhan Sabha	Ramesh Kant Lawania	Bharatiya Janata Party	Feb-2002	May-2007	1,902	-	
15	15th Vidhan Sabha	Bhagvan Singh Kushwaha	Bahujan Samaj Party	May-2007	Mar-2012	1,762	-	
16	16th Vidhan Sabha	Bhagvan Singh Kushwaha	Bahujan Samaj Party	Mar-2012	Mar-2017	-	-	
17	17th Vidhan Sabha	Mahesh Kumar Goyal	Bharatiya Janata Party	Mar-2017	Mar-2022			
18	18th Vidhan Sabha	Bhagvan Singh Kushwaha	Bharatiya Janata Party	Mar-2022	Incumbent			

== Election results ==
=== 2027 ===
2027 Uttar Pradesh Legislative Assembly election: Kheragarh
Party	Candidate	Votes	%	±%
INDIA				
NDA				
BSP	Pandit Neeraj Rawat			
NOTA	None of the above			
Majority				
Turnout				
gain from		Swing		

=== 2022 ===
2022 Uttar Pradesh Legislative Assembly election: Kheragarh
Party	Candidate	Votes	%	±%
BJP	Bhagvan Singh Kushwaha	96,574	47.05	▲0.01
INC	Ramnath Sikarwar	60,077	29.27	▲17.66
BSP	Gangadhar Kushwah	28,988	14.12	▼16.82
RLD	Rautan Singh	14,133	6.89	▲3.61
NOTA	None of the above	1,331	0.65	▲0.03
Majority		36,497	17.78	▲1.68
Turnout		205,257	62.45	▼1.72
BJP hold		Swing		

=== 2017 ===
2017 Uttar Pradesh Legislative Assembly Election: Kheragarh
Party	Candidate	Votes	%	±%
BJP	Mahesh Kumar Goyal	93,510	47.04	
BSP	Bhagvan Singh Kushwaha	61,511	30.94	
INC	Kusumlata Dixit	23,088	11.61	
Independent	Ramnath	7,680	3.86	
RLD	Ramendra Singh Parmar	6,520	3.28	
NOTA	None of the above	1,223	0.62	
Majority		31,999	16.1	
Turnout		198,781	64.17	

=== 2012 ===
2012 General Elections: Kheragarh
Party	Candidate	Votes	%	±%
BSP	Bhagvan Singh Kushwaha	69,533	36.36	−
SP	Rani Pakshalika Singh	62,427	32.65	−
RLD	Umesh Chand Senthia	30,432	15.91	−
	Remainder 10 candidates	28,826	15.07	−
Majority		7,106	3.72	−
Turnout		191,218	64.67	−
BSP hold		Swing		

== See also ==
- Agra district
- Fatehpur Sikri Lok Sabha constituency
- Sixteenth Legislative Assembly of Uttar Pradesh
- Uttar Pradesh Legislative Assembly
- Vidhan Bhawan
