= Harirāy =

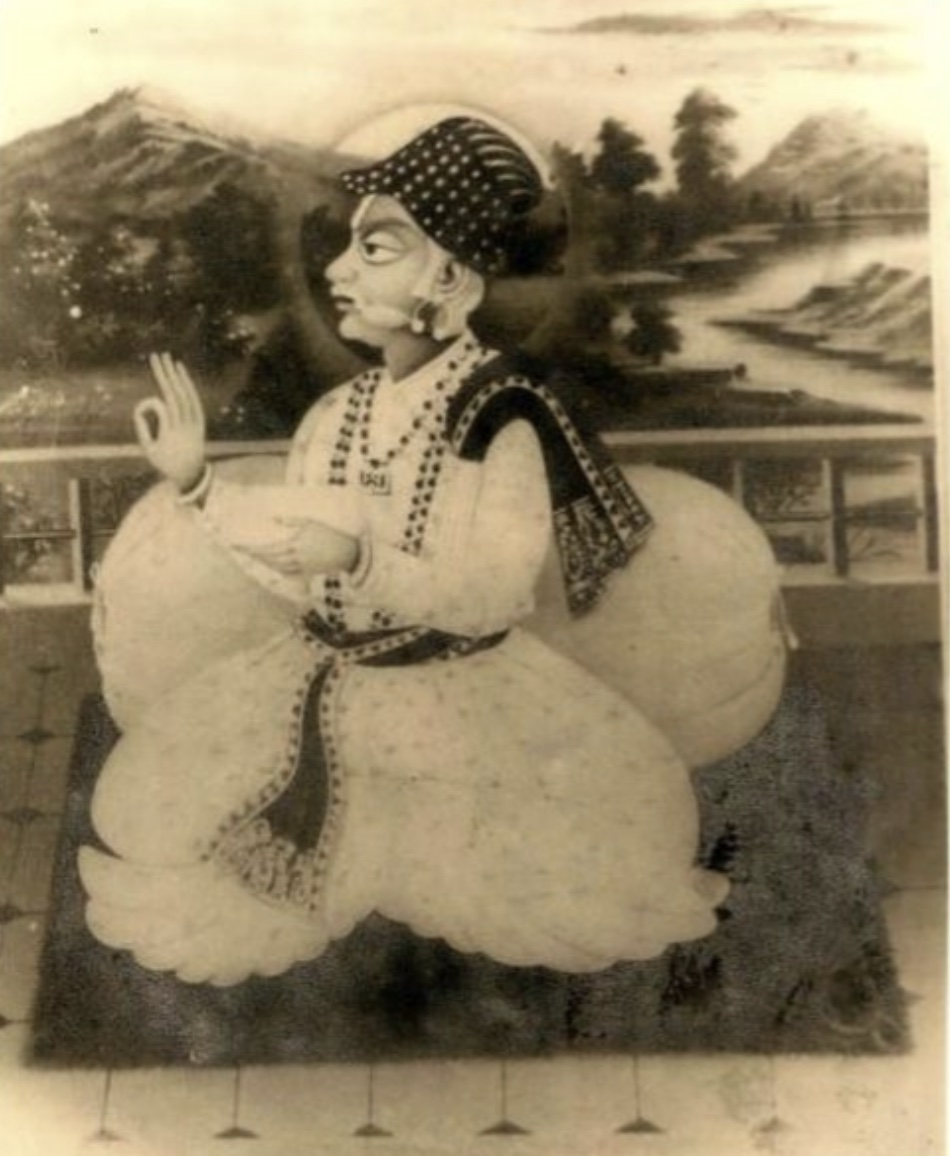
- Hariray Goswami of the Pushtimarg Hindu tradition
- Born: 1590 or 1591
- Died: 1715 or 1716
- Known for: Codifying the Varta Sahitya, Bade Shikshapatra, Bhāvprakāś commentary
- Works: Caurasi Vaishnavan ki Varta (editor), Do Sau Bavan Vaishnavan ki Varta (editor), Bade Shikshapatra
- Father: Kalyanray
- Relatives: Vallabhacharya (great-grandfather); Vitthalanatha (paternal ancestor); Gopeshwar (brother)

Harirāy (traditionally 1590–1715) was a prominent theologian, author, and religious leader in the Pushtimarg tradition of Hinduism. A fourth-generation descendant of the denomination's founder, Vallabhacharya, Harirāy is a central figure in the Vallabha Kul lineage and is traditionally believed to have lived for 125 years. He is widely recognized as the most prolific author in the denomination's history, credited with codifying its hagiographical literature and systematizing its ritual practices.

Harirāy's literary output spans Sanskrit, Braj Bhasha, and several regional languages. He is best known for his work on the Varta Sahitya (Chronicle Literature), specifically the Caurasi Vaishnavan ki Varta and Do Sau Bavan Vaishnavan ki Varta. Through his extensive commentary, the Bhāvprakāś, Harirāy interpreted the lives of early devotees to align with the philosophical principles of Shuddhadvaita, introducing key theological concepts such as the "Recollection of Three Lives" (Tīn Janma kī Bhāvnā) to explain the divine nature of the community.

As a religious authority, Harirāy consolidated the denomination's identity during the 17th century. He emphasized the supremacy of domestic sevā (devotional service) over asceticism, validating the householder lifestyle. His instructional text, the Bade Shikshapatra, remains a foundational manual for followers, delineating the emotional modes of worship, particularly the sentiment of separation (viraha) from Krishna. He is revered by followers as an authoritative guide who harmonized high theology with accessible narrative.

== Biography and lineage ==
Harirāy was a fourth-generation descendant of Vallabhacharya and a key member of the Vallabha Kul (the dynastic lineage of the founder). His lineage is traced through Vallabhacharya's second son and successor, Viṭṭhalanātha (1515–1585). Specifically, Harirāy's father was Kalyanray, who was the eldest son of Govindray, Viṭṭhalanātha's second son.

Within Pushtimarg tradition, Hariray held a position of significant religious authority. He led the denomination's second gaddi, established originally by his grandfather Govindray, and as eldest son of his lineage was responsible for the sevā of Shri Viṭṭhalanāthaji's svarup. The devotional practices that Vallabhacharya founded and Viṭṭhalanātha later organized were further developed through Hariray's contributions to seva rituals.

Sectarian tradition assigns Harirāy a remarkably long lifespan, holding that he lived for 125 years. His dates are traditionally cited as 1590–1715 or 1591–1716.

== Literary contributions ==
Harirāy is widely recognized as the most prolific author in the Pushtimarg tradition. His extensive literary output encompasses works in Sanskrit and Braj Bhasha, as well as regional compositions in Gujarati, Punjabi, and Marwari.

=== Vernacular poetry and prose ===
His poetic contributions include over 1,000 verses (padas) composed in Braj Bhasha. In these poems, he employed various chaps (poetic signatures), such as Rasnidhi, Rasik, Rasikpritam, Rasikray, Haridas, Haridhan, Harijan, and Madhukarni.

However, Hariray's most significant contribution to the denomination's canon is his work on the Varta Sahitya ("Chronicle Literature"). He is traditionally credited with the final codification and editing (praṇīt) of these foundational Braj Bhasha prose sacred biographies.

- Caurasi Vaishnavan ki Varta (84VV): This collection narrates the lives and legends of the eighty-four disciples originally initiated by Vallabhacharya. It serves as a vital historical record for key figures in the movement, including the Ashtachhap poets (such as Surdas, Kumbhandas, Parmanandadas, and Krishnadas), and acts as a source of sectarian inspiration. The text primarily highlights the transformative experiences of devotees following their initiation by Vallabhacharya.
- Do Sau Bavan Vaishnavan ki Varta (252VV): Sacred biographies of the 252 devotees initiated by Viṭṭhalanātha.
- Śrīnāthjī kī Prākaṭya Vārtā (Prākaṭya Vārtā): This narrative details the 15th-century manifestation of the denomination's principal icon, Shrinathji, and chronicles the deity's migration to Nathdwara, Rajasthan, during the 17th century.

The varta texts are historically significant as pioneering examples of North Indian vernacular prose.They established a stylistic precedent that influenced later 19th-century Hindi prose authors, including Lallu Lal and Bharatendu Harishchandra.

=== Sanskrit and commentarial works ===
Harirāy authored hundreds of texts in both Sanskrit and Braj Bhasha prose, ranging from original compositions to translations and commentaries on the theological treatises of Vallabhācharya and Viṭṭhalanātha.

==== The Bhāvprakāś commentaries ====
Among his most authoritative works is the Bhāvprakāś ("An Illumination of the Text’s Inner Meaning"). This commentary is integrated into specific recensions of the Caurasi Vaishnavan ki Varta and Do Sau Bavan Vaishnavan ki Varta narratives. Contemporary Pushtimargi readers largely view the commentary as inseparable from the primary text. It functions as a hermeneutical "guiding light," aiding devotees in interpreting the stories.

The primary purpose of the Bhāvprakāś is to harmonize the vernacular hagiographies with the philosophical and theological principles (siddhānt) of Vallabhācharya. Harirāy asserts the supremacy of the Caurasi Vaishnavan ki Varta narratives, arguing that they convey the essence of Vallabhācharya's Subodhinī commentary on the Bhagavata Purana. This interpretation effectively elevates the status of the vartas, linking them directly to the supreme deity, Krishna.

==== The Three Lives doctrine ====
A central concept introduced in the Bhāvprakāś is the "Recollection of the Three Lives" (Tīn Janma kī Bhāvnā). This interpretive framework bridges the devotee's worldly existence with Krishna's eternal divine play (lila). The three lives are defined as:

1. Laukik (worldly life): Details regarding the devotee's caste, family background, and place of birth.
2. Alaukik (otherworldly life): The devotee's eternal, predestined identity—often as a sakhī (female friend) or gopī—in Krishna's eternal pastimes.
3. Initiation: The transformation of the devotee's life following their encounter with the guru (Vallabhācharya or Viṭṭhalanātha) and reception of the initiation mantras.

In the introductions to many narratives, Harirāy supplies these additional biographical details, connecting the devotee's mundane circumstances to their divine function. This assignment of alaukik identities extends to the denomination's founders: Vallabhācharya is equated with Krishna's divine consort, Swamini (Radha), while Viṭṭhalanātha is identified as Swamini's chief companion, Chandravali. This theological structure reinforces the idea that the community consists of daivī jīvas (divine souls) who are specially chosen for the path.

==== Resolution of doubt (Sandeha) ====
Another critical function of the Bhāvprakāś is to address and resolve "doubts" (sandeha) regarding the potentially controversial or unconventional behavior of devotees within the narratives. Harirāy frequently utilizes hypophora, posing questions on behalf of the reader to anticipate confusion and provide the orthodox sectarian interpretation.

For example, in the story of Virbai, a devotee who performs ritual service while in a state of impurity due to childbirth, Harirāy intervenes to legitimize her actions. He argues that her intense emotional bond (bhava) with the deity supersedes standard ritual rules, stating that because she had the deity's explicit permission and love, her actions were "neither wicked nor impure."

Similarly, in the narrative of Krishnadas Adhikari, who creates a scene involving a prostitute, Harirāy uses the character's divine alaukik identity to explain the behavior. He reframes the act to smooth over moral objections, concluding that the ultimate lesson is one of faith and the propagation of the tradition, arguing that even questionable actions can inspire pure devotion in others.

=== The Bade Shikshapatra ===
The Bade Shikshapatra ("The Great Teaching Letters") functions as an instructional guide centered on the theology and ritual practice of image-worship (seva). The text comprises 41 letters written in Sanskrit verse by Harirāy, paired with a Braj Bhasha prose commentary attributed to his younger brother, Gopeshwar (b. 1593). It is believed to have been composed during the mid-to-late 17th century.

==== Origin story ====
Tradition ascribes the origin of the text to a miraculous event that underscores Harirāy's spiritual foresight. While traveling, Harirāy had a premonition that the wife of his brother, Gopeshwar, would die in two months. Recognizing his brother's deep emotional attachment to her, Harirāy sent daily letters intended to strengthen him spiritually against the loss. Gopeshwar, however, was busy with his devotional duties and did not read them immediately. After his wife's death, he was so overcome with grief that he considered abandoning his religious obligations to retire to the jungle. A disciple eventually persuaded him to read the neglected letters, which allowed him to perceive the transformative nature of divine grace. Consoled by this wisdom, he studied the letters deeply and subsequently dictated a commentary to his followers, which was integrated into the final text.

==== Doctrinal content ====
The work functions as a manual for "chosen" (pushti) souls, specifying the mental and physical disciplines necessary for the proper worship of Krishna's sacred image. Through its forty-one letters and associated commentary, the text delineates the sensory, emotional, and behavioral protocols that a devotee must observe, both when in the presence of the deity and during times of separation. Key themes include:

- The Primacy of Seva: Harirāy identifies devotional service as the supreme religious duty (Dharma), asserting that it supersedes all other obligations, including social duties, household management, and even strict compliance with Vedic duties. While the tradition does not demand physical asceticism, the text prescribes a psychological detachment from worldly attractions to facilitate devotion characterized by pure love (premalakshana bhakti). This worship must be non-transactional; devotees are instructed to serve without seeking any reward from Krishna, except for his pleasure, which is seen as superior to spiritual liberation.
- Vatsalya Bhava: Devotees are encouraged to foster parental love for the sacred image of Krishna, emulating the emotions of his mother, Yashoda.
- Viraha (Separation): Harirāy posits that the highest spiritual state is not union (samyoga) with Krishna, but rather the intense longing generated by his absence (viyoga). The text describes a devotional progression in which pure love (prema) evolves into attachment (asakti) and culminates in a state of "addiction" (vyasana) to one's beloved Krishna. In this ultimate state, the devotee is consumed by an insatiable craving for the deity, visualizing Krishna everywhere, even when the physical form is not visible. This internalized burning, often termed manasi (mental) seva, is described as a theological paradox where the agonizing pain of separation is simultaneously experienced as the "sweetest bliss" (mukhya rasa).
- Esoteric Nature: In his commentary on the final shloka of the text, Gopeshwar employs the metaphor of a concealed gem to describe the text, asserting that its teachings should remain guarded from all but the "qualified"—defined specifically as the elect (pushti) souls of the Vallabha tradition. While the work is fundamentally a sectarian manual intended for a specific circle of initiates, it retains enduring relevance in contemporary practice for its central assertion that selfless love for God is the most effective form of religious expression.

== Influence and legacy ==
Harirāy is widely recognized as the primary codifier of the Pushtimarg tradition. His contributions were pivotal in solidifying the denomination's identity, bridging the gap between Vallabhacharya's complex theology and the practical devotional lives of followers.

=== Codifying practice and doctrine ===
Harirāy's role in editing the Varta Sahitya and providing its commentary was instrumental in preserving the denomination's traditions. The narratives, enriched by Harirāy's Bhāvprakāś, achieved immense popularity and are often consulted more frequently by devotees than Vallabhacharya's original Sanskrit philosophical works.

Through his interpretive lens, Harirāy connected the vibrant life stories of early devotees directly to Vallabhācharya's Shuddhadvaita (pure non-dualism) philosophy. The Bhāvprakāś articulates the denomination's focus on intimacy with Krishna; devotees understand the varta narratives as embodiments (svarup) of the deity himself. By assigning divine counterparts (alaukik roles) to the protagonists within Krishna's eternal play, Harirāy affirmed that the community of devotees shares an intimate bond with the deity. The relationship between the devotee and their Krishna icon serves as a conduit between the worldly (laukik) and divine (alaukik) realms.

=== Historicization and authority ===
Harirāy's efforts to historicize the tradition were vital, especially when the denomination later faced external criticism. His method of correlating varta events with external historical frameworks influenced subsequent leaders. For instance, modern commentators such as Dwarkadas Parikh utilized Harirāy's model—linking narratives to Mughal records like the Akbarnama—to defend the historical authenticity of the Varta Sahitya against modern scholarly critiques.

The attribution of the Śrīnāthjī kī Prākaṭya Vārtā to Harirāy highlights this focus on historical documentation. Although some scholars suggest it was committed to writing in the 19th century, the text is noted for its "historiographic texture," using specific dates to anchor the narrative, distinct from other hagiographies.

=== Emphasis on domestic seva ===
Harirāy's writings reinforce the Pushtimarg emphasis on the householder lifestyle, validating marriage, family life, and financial pursuits. This aligns with the denomination's central practice of caring for Krishna icons in domestic settings rather than promoting ascetic renunciation.

Through works like the Bade Shikshapatra, Harirāy emphasized the emotional dimension (bhava) of devotion, translating theological concepts into practical guidance for daily life. By establishing the Bhāvprakāś as the definitive interpretive tool and the Bade Shikshapatra as the authoritative ritual manual, Harirāy successfully integrated high theology with accessible narrative, creating a comprehensive literary tradition that remains central to the sampradaya.
