= Vrind =

Indian writer

Vrind (1643–1723) was an Indian saint and poet in Hindi language from Marwar, in present Rajasthan. He was an important poet of the Ritikal period of Hindi literature, known for his poems on ethics (Niti), and most known for his work Nitisatsai (1704), a collection of 700 aphorisms. He was the guru of Raj Singh (r. 1706–1748), ruler of Kishangarh, where he was court poet.

Like his contemporaries, Mati Ram, Rasnidhi and Ram Sahay, his doha poetry was primarily in Braj Bhasha dialect. It was deeply influenced by Bihari, noted poet of the preceding generation. He was a prolific poet and through his career worked for various patrons. His notable works include Vrind Satsai, a didactic work, Shringar shiksha, Bhava panchasika (Fifty Verse of Bhava), Rupak chayanika, Alamkaar satsai and Hitopdesh natak, based on Hitopadesha, a collection of Sanskrit fables. Shringar shiksha (Instruction in Passion), a treatise of Nayika Bheda was written in 1691 for a prominent Muslim patron in Ajmer.

After serving in Kishangarh, he moved to Delhi in 1673, where he was hired to tutor Azim-ush-Shan, son of Azam Shah and grandson of Mughal Emperor Aurangzeb. Azam Shah later succeeded his father, and was a great enthusiast of Braj poetry, and in time Azim us-Shan became patron of Vrind. In 1697, Azim ush-Shan was made Governor of Bengal,.... thus Vrind too shifted to Dhaka. During this period, he completed his most noted work, Nitisatsai (Seven Hundred Verses of Ethics) in 1704.

== Works ==
- Nitisatsai (1704)
- Vrind Satsai
- Shringar shiksha (1691)
- Bhava panchasika
- Rupak chayanika
- Alamkaar satsai
- Hitopadesh natak

== See also ==
- Braj Bhasha literature
