= Caurāsī Vaiṣṇavan kī Vārtā =

17th-century manuscript of the Eighty-Four Vaishnavas

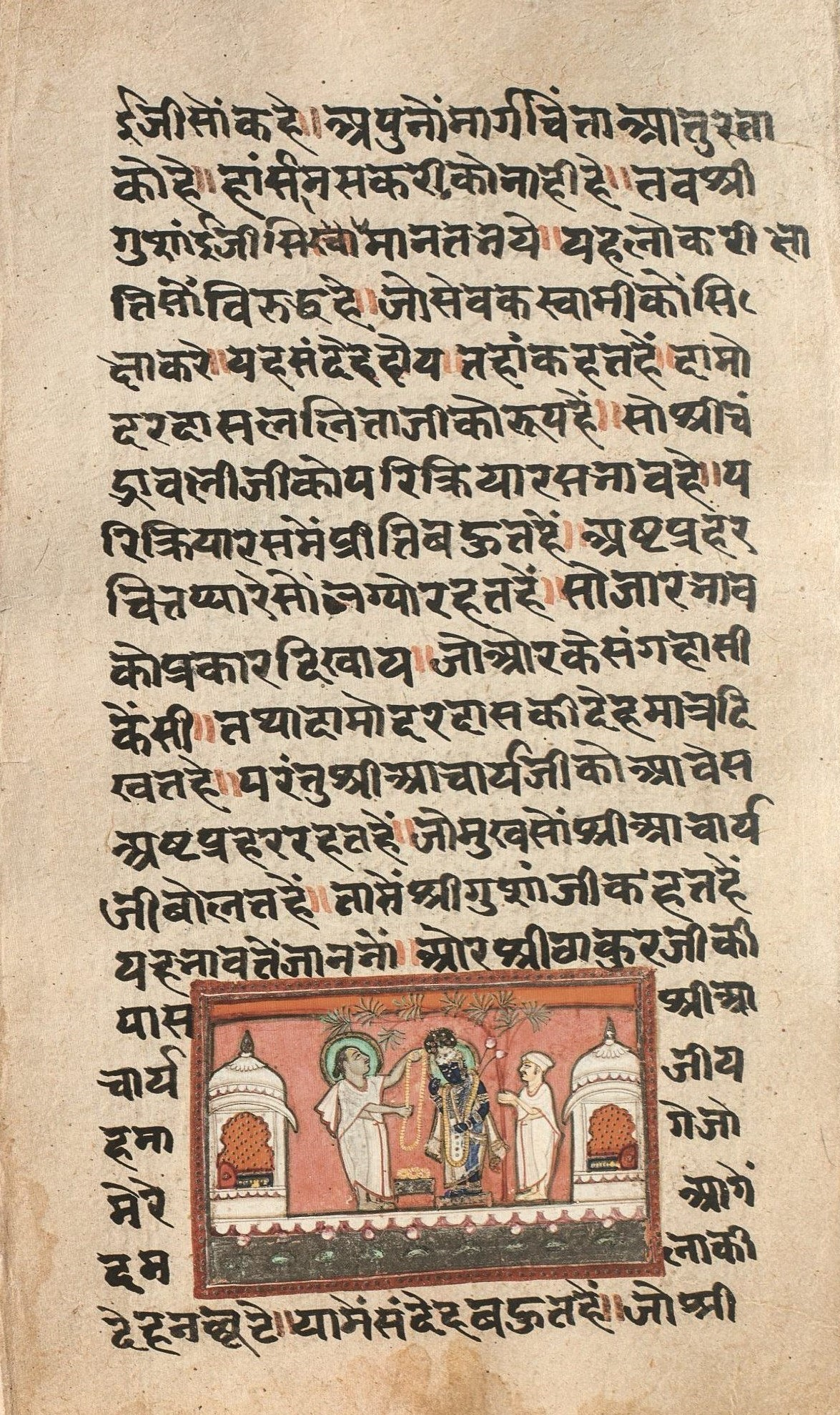
- Illustrated manuscript of the Caurāsī Vaiṣṇavan kī Vārtā
- Author: Gokulanātha; Edited and Compiled by Harirāy
- Original title: चौरासीवैष्णवनकी वार्ता
- Working title: Chronicles of the Eighty-Four Vaishnavas
- Language: Braj Bhasha
- Series: Vārtā literature
- Subject: Sacred Biography, Hinduism, Pushtimarg
- Genre: Sacred Biographical prose
- Publication date: Late 17th century (final form)

The Caurāsī Vaiṣṇavan kī Vārtā (Braj: चौरासी वैष्णवन की वार्ता; Chronicles of the Eighty-Four Vaishnavas), sometimes abbreviated as the 84VV, is a sacred biographical text written in Braj Bhasha prose and composed within the Pushtimarga denomination of the Vaishnava branch of Hinduism. The text presents narratives of eighty-four devotees of the Hindu philosopher Vallabhācārya across a range of geographical and social backgrounds, emphasizing that unwavering devotion to Krishna and the guru matters more than caste or gender in determining a devotee's spiritual standing.

The narratives are attributed to Gokulanātha (1551–1640), a grandson of Vallabhācārya. Harirāy (c. 1590–1716) is recognized as the compiler and commentator who brought the collection to its final written form by the end of the 17th century. Harirāy's commentary, the Bhāvprakāś, interprets each devotee's worldly biography as connected to their eternal identity in Krishna's divine play. The Caurāsī Vaiṣṇavan kī Vārtā is structured as a series of accounts, each divided into episodes built around direct speech between devotees, the guru Vallabhācārya, and the deity Krishna. It promotes householder service (gṛhastha sevā) over asceticism, parental affection for Krishna, and the importance of the guru as important aspects of the ideal devotional life. In the 19th century, the text was cited in the Maharaj Libel Case of 1862, after which the community turned to print to reauthorize its literature, most influentially in Dwarkadas Parikh's edition of 1948. The text remains important to the Pushtimarga Sampradaya, and is actively read and discussed in contemporary community gatherings.

== Manuscript history ==
The collection of oral narratives comprising the Caurāsī Vaiṣṇavan kī Vārtā are traditionally ascribed to Gokulanātha (1551–1640), the fourth son of Viṭṭhalanātha, leader of the Pushtimarg tradition. Harirāy (1590–1716), Vallabhācārya's great-great-grandson, brought the collection to its final written form through editing and compilation toward the end of the 17th century while residing in Rajasthan.

=== Oral tradition and transcription ===
The vārtās emerged as spoken accounts integrated into Gokulanātha's sermons as illustrative teachings. Devotees, such as Krishna Bhatt and Govardhandas, committed these narratives to writing as they listened.

=== Harirāy's editorial work ===
Beyond compiling the oral narratives, Harirāy authored the Bhāvprakāś ("Illumination of the Inner Meaning"), an extensive commentary on the Caurāsī Vaiṣṇavan kī Vārtā, considered important for correct interpretation by most of the Pushtimarg community. The commentary, also termed "Recollection of the Three Lives" (Tīn Janma kī Bhāvnā), interprets each devotee's story across three linked existences: 1)their current worldly life that includes occupation, birthplace, and caste, 2)their divine life in Krishna's eternal divine līlā, and 3)their life as Vaishnavas after getting initiation from Vallabhācārya or his successors. The core text of the Caurāsī Vaiṣṇavan kī Vārtā focuses more on the protagonist's life after Vaishnava initiation, while the commentary provides further details about worldly life and the divine life in Krishna's realm. This framework allows the commentary to present ordinary biographical episodes as manifestations of a pre-existing divine identity that is gradually remembered and realized over these three lives. The ultimate goal of the commentary is to help the Vaishnav devotee realize that their consciousness of the worldly body as their self is false ego, and they are truly a transcendent, divine being in eternal play with Krishna.

=== Recensions and dating ===
Within the Pushtimarg tradition, the Caurāsī Vaiṣṇavan kī Vārtā circulates in two primary versions labeled by scholar Richard Barz as recension A and recension B.

Recension A preserves the narrative without commentarial additions and represents the earlier textual form. Scholar Shandip Saha dates the oldest surviving manuscript of this version to 1601 CE. It was printed in 1883 in Mathura under the title Caurāsi Bārttā, and it is the source of later editions and translations into Gujarati, including the popular 1917 Gujarati edition with explanatory notes by Lallubhai Chaganlal Desai, reprinted in 1971.

Recension B incorporates Harirāy's Bhāvprakāś commentary, with the earliest extant manuscript dating to 1695 CE. The printed version of this recension is available as Caurāsi vaisnavan ki vārtā (Tin janma ki Lilā Bhāvnā Vāli).

== Literary structure ==
The Caurāsī Vaiṣṇavan kī Vārtā is composed in Braj Bhasha prose, a vernacular dialect of Western Hindi that was very popular in North Indian devotional literature between the 15th and 19th centuries. A single vārtā usually runs to around fifteen hundred words and breaks into shorter units called prasaṅgs, or episodes. Taken together, the accounts describe a following of people of various social backgrounds that the movement's earliest leaders built up mostly in northern and western India. The language of the Caurāsī Vaiṣṇavan kī Vārtā reflects the way people spoke in Braj in the early modern period.

=== Dialogue and vacanāmṛt ===
The narrative architecture of the text is dialogical, organized around records of direct speech known as vacanāmṛt (nectarous speech). These passages present themselves as conversations between the devotee, the guru Vallabhācārya and his descendants, and the deity Krishna, treated not as literary devices but as speech acts that demonstrate intimate communication with the Divine.

Such utterances, particularly those of Krishna and Vallabhācārya, are an important reason the devotional community considers the vārtā texts authoritative. Modern interpreters often append lists of these vacanāmṛts to printed versions or translations of the text. The dialogue also shows devotees how they might cultivate their own relationships with Krishna, with their gurus, and with one another.

Contemporary readers point to the vacanāmṛt as evidence of the vārtā texts' authenticity, and the vārtā texts' authors and later readers both note that the works of Vallabhācārya also support their authenticity. For example, Harirāy's commentary opens with Gokulanātha, who explains that his failure to accomplish his daily recitation of the Subodhinī, Vallabhācārya's commentary on the Bhāgavatapurāṇa, is not actually a failure as his narration of the stories of the eighty-four Vaishnavas provides the same benefit as the Subodhinī recitation. Bachrach notes this as a claim that the vārtā texts convey the essence of Vallabhācārya's Sanskrit writings in a way that is more accessible to and popular with most Pushtimarg devotees.

The text adopts the style of oral storytelling, as indicated by the phrase "Caurāsī vaiṣṇavan kī vārtā karat" (discussing the chronicles of the 84 Vaishnavas). According to Saha, the theological framework of the text was shaped by an earlier collection of Gokulanātha's, the Śrī Gokulnāth ke Caubīs Vacanāmṛt ("Twenty-Four Nectarean Utterances of Gokulanātha"). This text was written down by Gokulanātha's devotee Kalyāṇ Bhaṭṭ, and the Caurāsī Vaiṣṇavan kī Vārtā amplified its themes.

=== Numerological significance ===
The restriction of the collection to exactly eighty-four narratives is structurally and theologically significant. In Indian cosmology, the number 84 corresponds to the belief that there are 84 lakh (8.4 million) species of living beings through which the soul migrates before achieving human birth. The structural implication is that the eighty-four Vaishnavas selected for the text represent at least one exemplary devotee responsible for the liberation of deserving souls in each lakh (100,000) of these categories of existence, demonstrating the universal applicability of the Pushtimarg path.

== Narratives and themes ==
The Vaishnavas featured in the vārtā texts represent a wide spectrum of socioeconomic, religious, and cultural backgrounds, hailing from geographical regions ranging from Kabul in the north to Tamil Nadu in the south, Bengal in the east, and Gujarat in the west. The texts include characters from diverse social groups, including Brahmins, Kshatriyas, Shudras, women, Muslims, Jains, tribals, prostitutes, kings, farmers, thieves, widows, orphans, beggars, and yogis. While caste identity is explicitly stated at the beginning of every vārtā, the narratives emphasize that sincere devotion to Krishna and the guru is the highest virtue, surpassing distinctions of caste and gender.

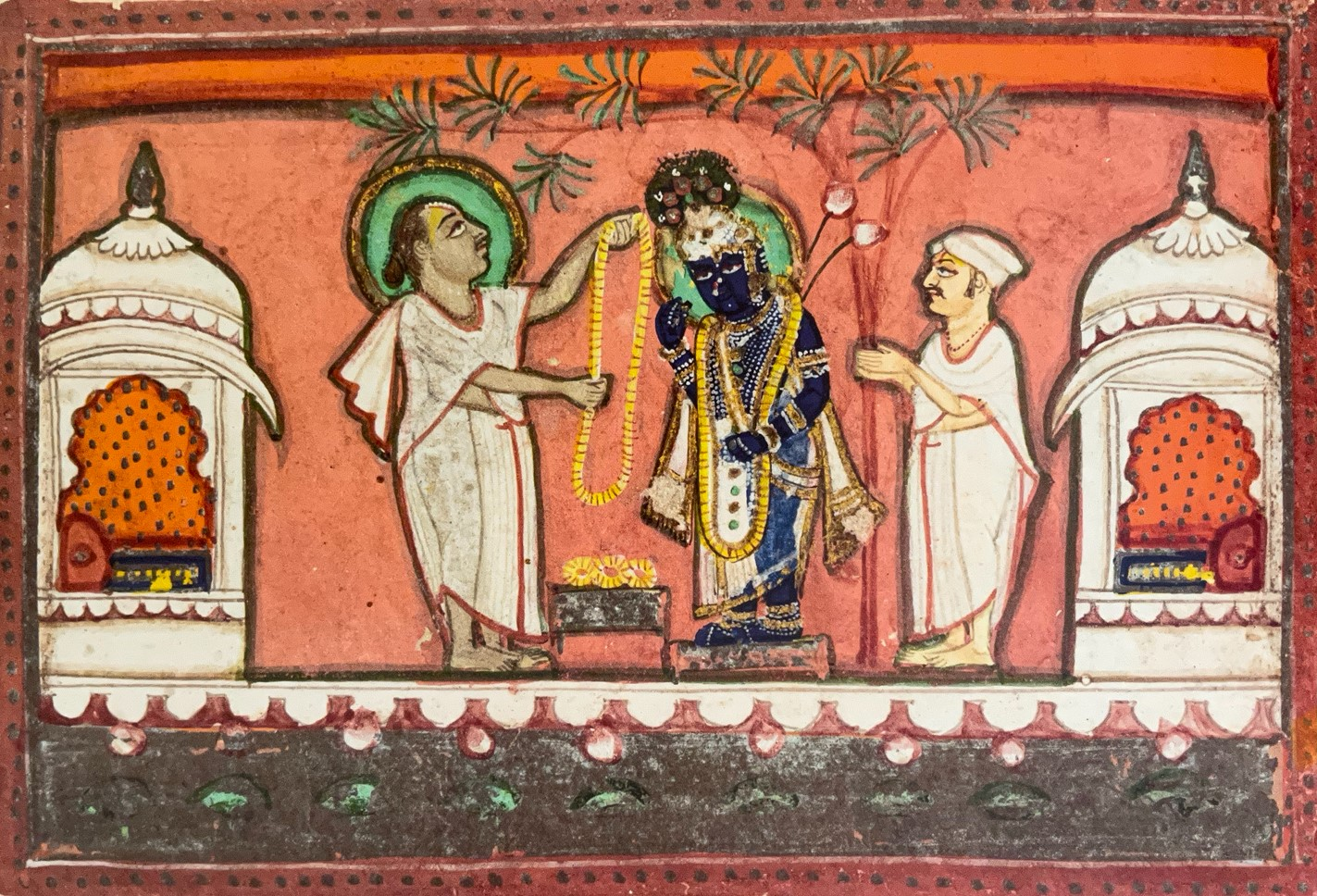
Vallabhācārya (left) offering Krishna (center) a flower garland after having received the brahmasambandha mantra. Vallabhācārya's first disciple Damodardas Harsani is on the right.

=== Damodardas Harsani ===
The collection begins with a detailed account of the life of Damodardas Harsani, who was Vallabhācārya's initial initiate. His sacred biography serves as the theological groundwork for the brahmasambandha initiation, a rite that remains a cornerstone of Pushtimarg practice. The narrative recounts a nocturnal vision in which Krishna appeared to Vallabhācārya to deliver the initiation mantra directly. Although Damodardas Harsani was present during this manifestation, the text notes that he could not grasp its spiritual significance until he was himself formally initiated with the mantra by Vallabhācārya.

Furthermore, the text includes a significant dialogue between Damodardas and Vallabhācārya's son, Viṭṭhalanātha, regarding the hierarchy of spiritual authority. When questioned on the relative importance of Krishna and Vallabhācārya, Damodardas identifies Vallabhācārya as superior on the grounds that it is the guru who facilitates the soul's access to the deity. This exchange underscores a theological framework where the guru's role is uniquely elevated within the Pushtimarg devotional system, since the devotee's contact with the divine is realized only through the proper channel of Vallabhācārya or his familial lineage through Viṭṭhalanātha.

=== Damodardas Sambhalware ===
The third sacred biography in the collection focuses on Damodardas Sambhalware, serving as a cautionary account regarding the spiritual consequences of skepticism within the devotional community. The narrative centers on a conflict of faith: after Vallabhācārya promised the couple a son would be born to them, Damodardas's wife sought further confirmation from an astrologer. Within the text, this reliance on external divination is characterized as a fundamental lack of trust in the guru's word that results in her ostracization.

After this event, Vallabhācārya instructed Damodardas to avoid touching him, as his wife’s act of consulting an astrologer was taking refuge in another, which is tantamount to spiritual infidelity. Vallabhācārya told him that while he would still have a son, the son would be a vile non-believer. Damodardas responded by rejecting his wife, refusing to eat with her, or even look at her. After giving birth, his wife attempted to atone for her sin by blindfolding herself and never looking at the face of her son.

After Damodardas's death, his repentant widow tried to gift all the family's wealth and property to Vallabhācārya. However, Vallabhācārya refused the offering, asserting that her initial doubt had spiritually tainted both the family's assets and their child. Consequently, the entirety of the estate, including a maidservant who had entered the household as part of the wife's dowry, was directed by Vallabhācārya to be disposed of into the Yamuna River. This story is used to highlight the Pustimarg emphasis on the absolute authority of the guru and the belief that devotional integrity is a prerequisite for ritual purity and community inclusion.

=== Kumbhandas ===
Kumbhandas Gorva (1468–1582) was a farmer-poet highlighted for his unpretentious, rural sensibilities, making him a model for practitioners who found more idealized holiness inaccessible. Following his brahmasambandha initiation by Vallabhācārya, Kumbhandas dedicated himself to the darshan of Shrinathji and the composition of kirtan verses to be performed before the deity. His vārtā emphasizes the rejection of worldly status in favor of devotional proximity. The text records his rejection of royal patronage from Emperor Akbar at Fatehpur Sikri, where he reportedly asserted that the grass of Braj was spiritually superior to imperial wealth, and refused land revenue rights from Raja Man Singh I.

A defining episode concerns the death of his son, Krishnadas, who was killed by a tiger while guarding temple cattle. Kumbhandas's collapse upon hearing the news was misinterpreted as conventional parental grief, whereas Viṭṭhalanātha identified his distress as caused by the ritual impurity (sutaka) that would traditionally bar him from darshan of the sacred image of Krishna. Upon receiving a promise that he could view the deity the following morning despite the pollution, Kumbhandas joyfully arose. This narrative is understood to illustrate the principle that the pain of separation (viraha) from the divine takes precedence over familial loss, demonstrating a hierarchy of devotional priorities over worldly bonds.

Finally, the text describes Kumbhandas categorizing his seven sons based on their commitment to sevā. He excluded five sons who performed no service from his spiritual lineage and termed Krishnadas "half a son" for performing labor without the internal spirit of viraha. Only his son Chaturbhujdas, who expressed deep distress when separated from Shrinathji, was regarded as his full spiritual heir.

=== Krishnadas and his wife ===
The seventy-fifth sacred biography of the collection concerns a married couple, Krishnadas and his wife, who were both disciples of Vallabhācārya. This Krishnadas is not the temple manager Krishnadas Adhikari, whose life is described in the eighty-fourth vārtā, nor Kumbhandas's son of the same name.

Krishnadas was travelling on business when a group of devotees visited his house. Since hospitality to fellow devotees is an important service in the tradition, his wife, with neither food in the house nor money to buy any, went to the local grocer, who agreed to supply her if she would later return to spend the night with him. She agreed and fed her guests. When he returned, Krishnadas approved of her choice and carried her to the grocer on his shoulders so as not to muddy her feet. The grocer was overwhelmed by the couple's integrity, and realizing them as great souls, asked for their pardon and joined the Pushtimarga. Harirāy's commentary explains that service to fellow devotees is paramount and cautions those without strong faith from reading this story lest they misconstrue its message.

=== Krishnadas Adhikari ===
Krishnadas Adhikari, whose life is the subject of the eighty-fourth and final sacred biography in the collection, was a devotee of Vallabhācārya who served as the chief administrator (adhikārī) of the Shrinathji temple at Govardhan during the leadership of Vallabhācārya and Viṭṭhalanātha. He was also one of the eight Braj Bhasha poets (aṣṭachāp) whose songs were performed before the deity. Born in Cilotara, Gujarat into a Shudra family of the Kanbi caste, his father was a village headman who disowned him at the age of 12 when he exposed his father's criminal behavior. Krishnadas traveled to Braj where Vallabhācārya initiated him and initially made him responsible for gathering donations from outside Braj. Saha treats his rise as an instance of a Shudra disciple gaining standing through his influential post in the community, though he adds that class distinctions persisted among Vallabha's followers.

Two early episodes show Krishnadas enforcing the community's boundaries. On a journey to collect offerings at Dwarka, he stopped at the house of Mirabai and refused her gift of eleven gold coins for Shrinathji because she was not Vallabhācārya's disciple. He explained to his disciples that by rejecting her donation, a Shudra servant of Vallabha had deflated the pride of the leaders of other sects waiting there for her generosity. In the second episode, Krishnadas removed the Bengali followers of Chaitanya whom Vallabhācārya had placed in charge of Shrinathji's worship, and who were sending the temple's offerings to their gurus in Vrindavan. With Viṭṭhalanātha's consent and letters to Todar Mal and Birbal at the Mughal court, Krishnadas set fire to their huts, kept them out of the temple when they returned from fighting the flames, and drove them off. Their appeals to Rūpa and Sanātana, to the governor of Mathura, and to Akbar all failed, and Viṭṭhalanātha invested Krishnadas as the first holder of the office of adhikārī of the Shrinathji temple.

In another episode, while buying supplies in Agra, Krishnadas was entranced by the singing and dancing of a prostitute's beautiful twelve-year-old daughter. He gave her ten rupees to come to his residence that night to sing and dance for him, and then 100 rupees to accompany him back to Govardhan. There, she sang one of his songs before Shrinathji and immediately died, and Krishnadas gave the mother 1000 rupees in recompense and sent her off. Harirāy's commentary explains that the prostitute girl was really a godly being as was evidenced by the fact that she became so overwhelmed with joy by singing for Shrinathji that she left her body to live eternally with Krishna.

The seventh episode describes Krishnadas's quarrel with Viṭṭhalanātha. After a dispute concerning Gangabai Kshatrani, whom Krishnadas was very fond of, Krishnadas barred Viṭṭhalanātha from the temple and installed Purushottam, son of Viṭṭhalanātha's late elder brother Gopīnātha, as the community's rightful leader. Viṭṭhalanātha spent six months at Parasoli until Birbal had Krishnadas jailed in Mathura. Viṭṭhalanātha fasted until his release, and on his return reinstated the penitent Krishnadas as adhikārī. Garlington dates the ban of Viṭṭhalanātha to 1543 and argues that it makes the episode a model of viraha, the longing of separation from God. Later, Krishnadas fell into a well near Pūñchari and became a preta, from which Viṭṭhalanātha released him by performing śrāddha rites at Dhruva Ghat in Mathura.

== Doctrinal emphasis ==
=== Householder service over ascetic withdrawal ===
Vallabhācārya taught that devotion should be practiced within the householder's life rather than through withdrawal from society. Devotees were to keep their worldly duties and devote all their wealth and labour to the service of Krishna's image in their homes and temples. Vallabhācārya regarded formal renunciation as a potentially dangerous source of pride, and he married, according to tradition, at Krishna's command. As a result, the community has no organised order of renunciants, and both leaders and members marry. Vallabhācārya did accept that a devotee wholly absorbed in Krishna could renounce the world as a natural consequence of that devotion, though not as a method for reaching that state. According to tradition, about a month before his death in 1531, Vallabhācārya himself formally renounced the world (took sannyāsa) and left home for Hanuman Ghat in Varanasi, where he spent his final days practising yoga on the banks of the Ganges.

The vārtā collections hold up the householder who earns a living as the model for followers, and Bachrach connects this emphasis both to the care of Krishna images in the home and to the succession of leadership through Vallabhācārya's male descendants. Pasche Guignard observes that the narratives of Vallabha's community contain neither extreme asceticism nor a monastic community, and that devotion takes place mostly within the family. Hawley, however, reads Vallabhācārya's own writings as more ambivalent about householder life than the later community suggests, since they address the spiritual obstacles of the householder's life as well as those of renunciant wandering. He argues that the community's settled, householder-centred form took shape only after Vallabhācārya's death, under Viṭṭhalanātha.

The text illustrates the principle through individual stories. In the seventy-second vārtā, Narhar Sannyasi practises severe austerities, sitting among fires in the summer heat and in icy water in winter, until Vallabhācārya teaches him that in the Kali Yuga such practices tend to be associated more with pride than devotion, and that body and mind should be dedicated to Krishna without retreating from society. In the seventieth vārtā, a carpenter from Adel leaves his family to stay near Vallabhācārya, and when his wife and mother complain that they are starving, Vallabhācārya sends him home to support them.

=== Parental affection (vātsalya bhāva) ===
Barz describes vātsalya bhāva, the sentiment of parental love, as having become the dominant mode of Pushtimarg devotion. While other approaches to the Divine include sentiments of servanthood (dāsya) or romantic longing (mādhurya), the Caurāsī Vaiṣṇavan kī Vārtā highlights narratives where the devotee cares for Krishna as a dependent child. This emphasis is attributed to Vallabhācārya, who favored this parental bond, in contrast to the more erotic devotional moods later preferred by his son, Viṭṭhalanātha. The erotic mode grew in importance under Viṭṭhalanātha until the gopīs came to be regarded as the gurus of the Pushtimarg.

Some narratives depicted Krishna as a small child whose well-being depends on the devotee's attention. The account of a widowed Kshatriya womanis one example. In her narrative, the deity is shown as a small child who calls her "Ma" and asks when he will be fed, thereby prompting the woman to provide maternal care.

This devotional attitude shapes the practical ritual of sevā (devotional service). Practitioners are encouraged to view the physical image (svarūp) as a living person who must be woken, dressed according to the season, fed, and put to rest each day. Some temples in Braj keep images of the child Krishna in cradles for devotees to rock. Contemporary devotees describe sensing their household image's comfort, and hearing it ask for food or complain of the cold, much as a child might ask a parent.

=== Importance of the guru ===
The vārtās also uphold the authority of Vallabhācārya and his descendants, the Vallabha Kul. Barz explains that in the early community the role of guru was confined to Vallabhācārya himself, which threatened its survival beyond his lifetime. Tradition resolved this by holding that Krishna had commanded him to marry and that his son Viṭṭhalanātha was an incarnation of Krishna's form, so that the power to confer the brahmasambandha initiation passed to his male descendants. The vārtā literature calls Vallabhācārya the mukhāvatār, the manifestation of Krishna's mouth, a title signifying both the divine speech through which he teaches and the divine fire through which he purifies his followers. In the opening vārtā, Damodardas Harsani tells Viṭṭhalanātha that Vallabha is greater than Krishna because he is the means by which Krishna is reached, and the text declares that Vallabha's essence lives on in Viṭṭhalanātha, his seven sons and their descendants. Vallabhācārya's elder son Gopīnātha, by contrast, is explained as an incarnation of Krishna's brother Balarāma who upheld ritual orthodoxy, and the followers he initiated are treated as illegitimate. Saha concludes that this framework made the maharajas effectively more important than Krishna in the eyes of devotees seeking liberation because the maharajas became dispensers of grace that allowed followers to become true Krishna devotees.

== Reception history and modern usage ==
=== The Maharaja Libel Case (1862) ===
In 1862, the Caurāsī Vaiṣṇavan kī Vārtā and the Do Sau Bāvan Vaiṣṇavan kī Vārtā were repeatedly cited in the Maharaja Libel Case in the Bombay Supreme Court, a suit brought in 1861 by the Pushtimarg leader Jadunath Brijratanji Maharaj against the journalist and social reformer Karsandas Mulji, who in an 1860 article had called the sect heterodox and immoral and had named Jadunath personally. Barz describes the trial as the low point of a period of decline in the community. Drawing on the historian J. Barton Scott, Bachrach sees in the trial an "Orientalist legal apparatus" of the British colonial state that set aside traditional religious authority while claiming the right to decide what counted as Hindu orthodoxy. British judges, notably Sir Matthew Sausse and Sir Joseph Arnould, assumed the authority to define "authentic" Hinduism by privileging ancient Sanskrit texts—the Vedas and Shastras—as the measure of the religion's legitimacy.

Under this Orientalist framework, the court dismissed the living, vernacular traditions codified in the vārtās as "heterodox" corruptions or deviations from original principles. On the third day of the hearings, the Pushtimargi witness Runchor Munjee referred to the story of Krishnadas and his wife, in which Krishnadas encouraged his wife to keep her promise to spend a night with a shopkeeper (see above). Asked by Mulji's counsel whether the husband's conduct was approved or condemned, Munjee answered that the book praises all three characters, and the wife above all for keeping her word. Justice Arnould cut short Munjee's explanation that each of the three had stayed true to their faith, remarking, "I don't think it is worth following it up. It is a story without a moral after all!" Near the end of the trial, Mulji's counsel argued that witnesses had shown the old Shastras to be superseded by the teachings of the vārtās, and that on the plaintiff's own reasoning "adulterine love" was presented as the best way to approach God. Bachrach argues that the complexity of the vārtā literature, including its theology and the relationship between text and commentary, was never acknowledged in court, Instead, devotees' own ways of reading were ignored and the texts served only as factual evidence. In her account, the trial produced a public, legal definition of the Pushtimarg that sidelined how most devotees understood their community and read their literature.

=== Standardization in print ===
Attacks on the community's legitimacy continued after the trial, including Dayananda Saraswati's 1875 pamphlet against Vallabhācārya's doctrine. Some within the community called the vārtās inaccurate representations of Vallabhācārya's original teachings, and one leader, Devakinandacharya, urged devotees to avoid vernacular texts that might be misconstrued to support immoral conduct. In response to these attacks, the Pushtimarg community utilized emerging print culture to "reauthorize" their literature. Before the 1860s the vārtās had mostly been read aloud in community gatherings with oral commentary, and Harirāy's Bhāvprakāś was their only substantial written commentary. Printed books made private reading possible, and the vārtās became a focus for new written commentaries. The Naval Kishore Press began mass production of the Caurāsī Vaiṣṇavan kī Vārtā in the 1880s, allowing it to reach a wider readership than ever before, although collections of the sacred biographies had already been printed at the Vyaghrapad Press in the late 1860s. The writer Bharatendu Harishchandra, a follower of the Pushtimarg, also helped restore the texts' standing. In 1876 he declared the Pushtimargi sacred biographies foremost among Vaishnava texts, and he modelled the heroine of his 1877 drama Candrāvalī on the figure of that name in Harirāy's commentary.

In the early 20th century, editors such as Lallubhai Chaganlal Desai published editions featuring "factual footnotes" (hakikat fūṭnot). Desai's Gujarati editions, first published in 1917, omitted the Bhāvprakāś and its account of each devotee's divine identity. Instead, Desai's annotations provided theological as well as empirical geographical and historical data to assert the narratives' objective accuracy against criticism from outside readers. The most influential edition is that of Dwarkadas Parikh, published in Braj Bhasha in 1948 with Harirāy's Bhāvprakāś commentary. It has been reprinted repeatedly, underlies many later Gujarati and English versions, and is used by most scholars working from printed texts. Parikh argued for the historical reliability of the text by demonstrating that the theological content of the vacanāmṛt (divine words) aligned with the formal Sanskrit treatises of Vallabhācārya and Viṭṭhalanātha, and by pointing to figures in the vārtās who also appear in other sources, such as the memoirs of the Mughal emperors Akbar and Jahangir.

=== Contemporary practice ===
In the 21st century, the Caurāsī Vaiṣṇavan kī Vārtā is described by Bachrach as a "performative canon," actively read and discussed in community gatherings known as satsaṅgs. Devotees use the text to navigate modern challenges, such as balancing the demands of the ritual calendar with professional work and travel. Modern devotees employ the text as a hermeneutical tool to solve contemporary ethical problems, such as determining appropriate food offerings for the deity. Prominent hereditary leaders like Shyam Manohar Goswami use public lectures to analyze the narratives, and the tradition has expanded into digital spaces by conveying the narratives as cartoons on YouTube. The text is also used in a ten-year correspondence course run by the Vallabha Vidyapith, whose advanced Gujarati volume, the Puṣṭimārgīy Patrācār ("Pushtimargi Correspondence"), is designed for devotees without access to community reading, who may include those living in the diaspora.

== See also ==
- Braj literature
