= Bhagvan Singh Kushwaha =

Indian politician (born 1968)

Member of the Uttar Pradesh Legislative Assembly
- Incumbent
- Assumed office 2022
- Preceded by: Mahesh Goyal
- Constituency: Kheragarh
- In office 2007–2017
- Preceded by: Rameshkant Lawania
- Succeeded by: Mahesh Goyal
- Constituency: Kheragarh

Personal details
- Born: 20 June 1968 (age 57) Agra, Agra district, Uttar Pradesh
- Party: Bharatiya Janata Party
- Other political affiliations: Bahujan Samaj Party (till 2021)
- Spouse: Anita Singh (m. 1993)
- Children: 1 son, 3 daughters
- Parent: Daulat Ram (father)
- Education: Bachelor of Education
- Alma mater: Dr. Bhimrao Ambedkar University
- Profession: Businessman & politician

Bhagvan Singh Kushwaha is an Indian politician and is member of the 18th Uttar Pradesh Assembly and also 16th Legislative Assembly of Uttar Pradesh Legislative Assembly, India. He represented the Kheragarh constituency of Uttar Pradesh and was a member of the Bahujan Samaj Party political party. In the year 2022 he joined Bharatiya Janata Party and is one of the candidates in Kheragarh Uttar Pradesh Assembly Election 2022.

== Early life and education ==
Bhagvan Singh Kushwaha was born in Agra district. He attended the Dr. Bhimrao Ambedkar University and attained Master of Science degree.

== Political career ==
Bhagvan Singh Kushwaha has been a MLA for two terms. He represented the Kheragarh constituency and is a member of the Bahujan Samaj Party political party.

He lost his seat in the 2017 Uttar Pradesh Assembly election to Mahesh Kumar Goyal of the Bharatiya Janata Party.

== Posts held ==
#	From	To	Position	Comments
01	May 2007	March 2012	Member, 15th Legislative Assembly	
02	March 2012	March 2017	Member, 16th Legislative Assembly	
03	March 2022	Incumbent	Member, 18th Legislative Assembly	

== See also ==
- Kheragarh (Assembly constituency)
- Sixteenth Legislative Assembly of Uttar Pradesh
- Uttar Pradesh Legislative Assembly
