= Rani Pakshalika Singh =

Indian politician

Rani Pakshalika Singh रानी पक्षालिका सिंह

Member of the Uttar Pradesh Legislative Assembly
- Incumbent
- Assumed office 2017

Personal details
- Born: 1961 (age 64–65)
- Party: Bhartiya Janta Party
- Spouse: Raja Mahendra Aridaman Singh
- Education: B.A.:1981 -- Women's Christian College Madras
- Profession: Social Worker, Politician

Maharani Pakshalika Singh bhadawar is an Indian politician from Uttar Pradesh. and Member of 18th Uttar Pradesh Assembly Election.

== Personal life ==
Her husband's name is Raja Mahendra Aridaman Singh.

== Education ==
She became graduate from Women's Christian College Madras in 1981.

== Political life ==
2017: Elected as Member of Legislative Assembly of Uttar Pradesh from Bah (Assembly constituency) as Bharatiya Janta Party candidate. She got 80,567 votes in this election.
