= Kavi Bhushan =

Indian poet

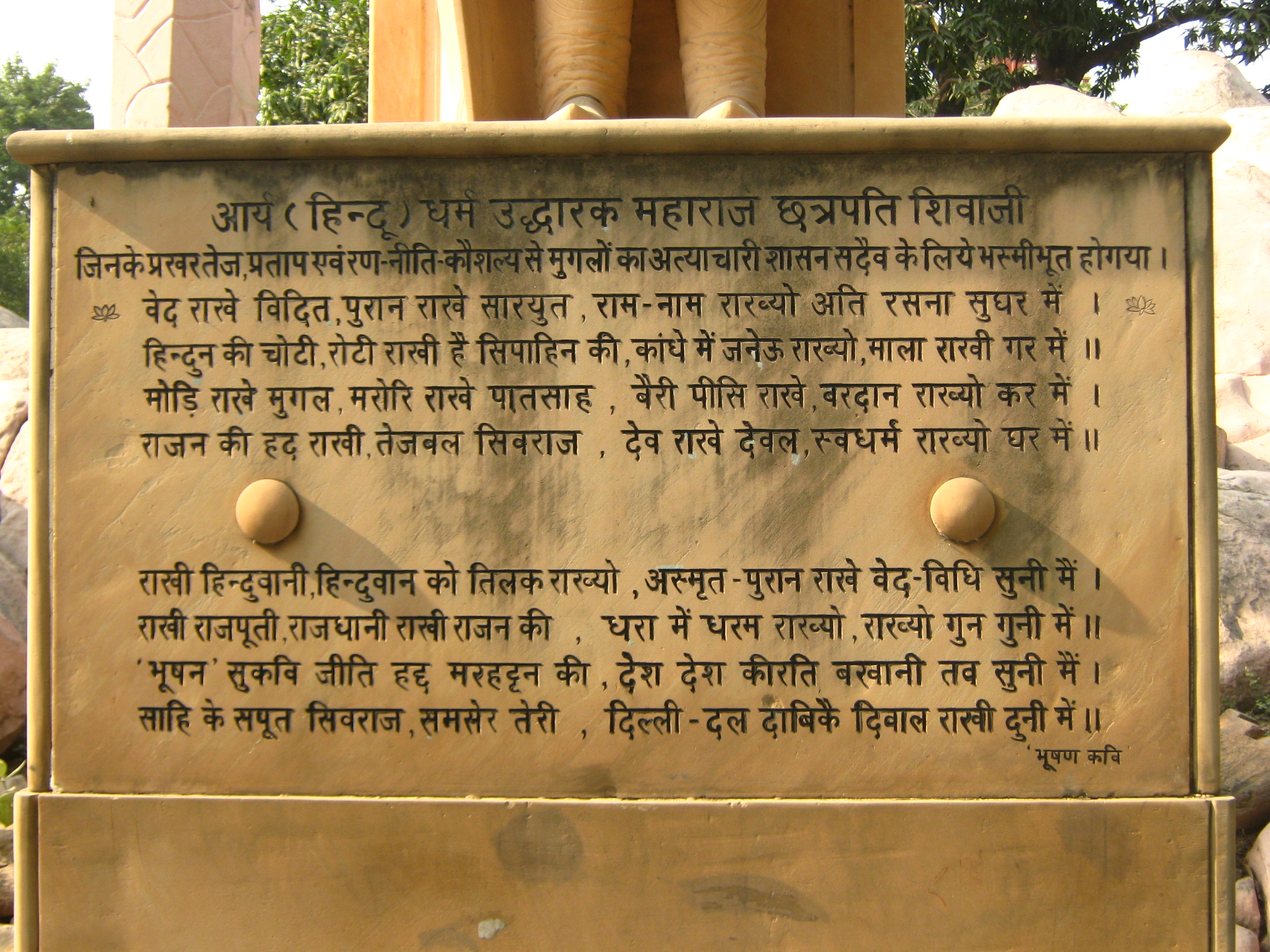
An inscription about one of Bhushan's poems about Chattrapati Shivaji, at the Birla Mandir, Delhi

Kavi Bhushan (c. 1613–1715)was an Indian poet in the courts of the Bundeli king Chhatrasal and the Maratha king Shivaji I. He mainly wrote in Brajbhasha interspersed with words from Sanskrit, Arabic and Persian languages. He was a scholar poet of Anurag and Shlesh Alankar.

== Early life ==
Bhushan originally resided in the Tikwapur village in present-day Ghatampur tehsil, Kanpur district of Uttar Pradesh in a Brahmin Family. He was the brother of the poets Chintamani and Matiram. Bhushan's original name is unknown. Kavi Bhushan ("Precious Poet") was a title given to him by the Rudra Pratap of Chitrakoot.

He first met Chatrapati Shivaji Maharaj when the latter visited Agra to meet the Mughal emperor Aurangzeb; thereafter, Bhushan was supported by Shivaji I. Bhushan later moved from Varanasi to Maratha Kingdom in the 1670s, and attended Shivaji's durbar (court)

== Literary works ==
- Shivaa Bhushan
- Shivabavani
- Chatrashaal Dashak
- Saaransh ki khani
