= Gokul Nath =

Gokulnath Kavi (Hindi: गोकुलनाथ कवि), was a late 18th to early 19th century court poet of the Kingdom of Kashi, especially under Maharaja Chait Singh and Maharaja Udit Narayan Singh. He is well known for composing the first complete verse translation of the Sanskrit Mahabharata called Mahabharat Darpan in the literary Braj Bhasha of Hindi. Gokulnath passed away before finishing the final sections of the text which were completed by his son Gopinath and his disciple Manidev.

Gokulnath's other works include: Chait Singh Chandrika, Radhakrishna Vilas, Radhanakhshikh etc.,
