= Rithora =

- Town
- Location in Uttar Pradesh, India
- Coordinates: 28.457354°N 79.505546°E
- Country: India
- State: Uttar Pradesh
- District: Bareilly
- Elevation: 890 m (2,920 ft)

Population (2011)
  - Total: 17,186

Languages
  - Official: Hindi
- Time zone: UTC+5:30 (IST)

Rithora is a town and a nagar panchayat in Bareilly Tehsil of Bareilly district in the Indian state of Uttar Pradesh.

It is sited at a distance of 15 km away from its district cum Tehsil Headquarters Bareilly, 269 km away from its state capital Lucknow and 263 km away from the national capital Delhi. People of all religions and communities reside in the city and they mostly speak Hindi.

Rithora is home to a total population of 17,186, as per the 2011 population census. The density of population is recorded as 1,718.6 people per km^{2} in an area of 10 km^{2}. Agriculture and agro-based industries are the main occupations of the locals in the town.

== Education ==
- Darbari Lal Sharma Inter College, Rithora

== Administration ==
Rithora constitutes a nagar panchayat with twelve wards for which elections are conducted once in five years to elect twelve ward members to the Rithora Nagar Panchayat to form the local body in the city. The city operates within Bareilly administrative division of Uttar Pradesh state administration.

Rithora comes under Bareilly sub district or tehsil in its district which is one of the six tehsils in Bareilly district apart from Aonla, Mirganj, Faridpur, Baheri and Nawabganj. Bareilly is the district Headquarters and Tehsil Headquarters of Rithora Nagar Panchayat.

Rithora comes within Bareilly Lok Sabha constituency and the current MP of the constituency is Shri Santhosh Kumar Gangwar elected to Indian Parliament in the year 2014.

== Demographics ==
Rithora is a Nagar Panchayat town in district of Bareilly, Uttar Pradesh. It is divided into twelve wards for which elections are held every five years. The Rithora Nagar Panchayat has population of 17,186 of which 9,114 are males while 8,072 are females as per report released by Census India 2011.

The population of children aged 0-6 is 2,651, which is 15.43% of total population of Rithora (NP). In Rithora Nagar Panchayat, the female sex ratio is 886, compared to a state average of 912. Moreover, the child sex ratio is around 895, as compared to the Uttar Pradesh state average of 902. The literacy rate in Rithora is 44.08%, which is lower than the state average of 67.68%. In Rithora, male literacy is around 53.79% while the female literacy rate is 33.09%.

Rithora Nagar Panchayat has total administration over 2,830 houses, to which it supplies basic amenities such as water and sewerage. It is also authorized to build roads within Nagar Panchayat limits and to impose taxes on properties coming under its jurisdiction.

=== Rithora Religion Data 2011 ===
Town	Population	Hindu	Muslim	Christian	Sikh	Buddhist	Jain	Others	Not Stated
Rithora	17,186	62.30%	36.79%	0.35%	0.28%	0.02%	0.06%	0.03%	0.17%

== Geography ==
Rithora is elevated at a height of 890 meters above sea level which is about 2920 feet. Rithora is bounded by Bithiri Chainpur Tehsil in the South, Bhojipura Tehsil in the North, Bhuta Tehsil in the East and Kyara Tehsil in the South. The city experiences a hot summer and a cool winter.

=== Nearby localities ===
The villages that are located nearby Rithora are Rajpura Mafi at 5.3 km away, Ahladpur at 6.8 km away, Kumhara at 5 km away, Chandpur Bichpuri at 13.7 km away and Mohanpur Urf Ram Nagar at 11 km away. The major cities that are sited nearby Rithora are Bareilly at 15 km away, Pilibhit at 34 km away, Sitarganj at 57 km away, Rudrapur at 62 km away and Rampur at 64 km away.

The taluks that are located nearby Rithora are Bithiri Chainpur at 16 km away, Bhojipura at 11 km away and Bhuta at 22 km away. The districts that lie nearby Rithora are Pilibhit at 34 km away, Budaun at 65 km away and Rampur at 64 km away.

The city is bounded by Nawadia Khudaganj and Tulsi Pur localities in the north, Khoh and Badhaipura Nikat Koh localities in the east, Indra Nagar and Kalapur localities in the south and Manehra and Dohna Pitam Rai localities in the west.

=== Tourist attractions ===
Rithora is located amidst many popular tourist attractions in Uttar Pradesh and Uttarakhand like Maa Purnagiri, Kathgodam, Tanakpur, Bareilly, Kashipur, and Chukka Point in the Pilibhit District.

== Regional Passport Office for Rithora ==
The Bareilly passport office is the regional passport office for Rithora.

== Transport ==
Rithora nagar panchayat has a good transport system in its grounds by means of roadways. The national highway NH 74 runs across the city linking Rithora to major destinations in Uttar Pradesh and Uttarakhand districts like Nagina, Dhampur, Kashipur, Afzalgarh, Kichha, Pilibhit, Gadarpur, Jaspur, Haridwar, Bareilly and many more.

The NH 74 also known as Pilibhit road links Rithora to its nearby localities of Indra Nagar, Kalapur, Aspur Khubchand, Barkapur, Nawadia Iiaqa Singhai, Adoopura Jagir, Labhera, Bhatpura Jagir, Labhera Urf Bulland Nagar, Khai Khera and many more. The other major roads running through the city are Rithora road and the Rithora to Bhojipura road.

=== Airports and railway stations ===
Rithora does not have its own airport or railway station. The Pantnagar airport is 74 km away and the Kheria airport is 243 km away. The Bareilly junction railway station is the nearest major railway station and is located a distance of 19.8 km away. Other railway stations that are located close to the city are Izzatnagar Junction railway station (16 km away) and Dohna railway station (12 km away).

== Sources ==
- census data
