= Chandayan =

- Interactive map of Chandayan
- Country: India
- State: Uttar Pradesh
- District: Baghpat

Chandayan is a village in Baghpat district in the state of Uttar Pradesh in India, around 100 kilometers from Delhi. In 2014 archeologists discovered that the village could once be a site belonging to late Indus Valley civilization period. If this proves to be true then it is a first instance that a late Harappan habitation has been found in Uttar Pradesh.

== Excavation ==
In 2014, Archaeological Survey of India began a detailed excavation of the site after local brick kiln workers stumbled upon human skeletal remains. So far numerous artefacts, some around 4000 years old, have been found.

== Discoveries ==
A human skeleton wearing a copper crown has been found. Copper crown is of thin copper strip decorated with precious Carnelian and a faience bead, typical of remains found at other Harappan sites. According to archeologist, the crown indicates that skeleton was probably of important person like chieftain or village head. Terracotta pottery, crudely crafted & not of fine quality, has also been found near the skeleton.

A burial area is also exposed containing 21 pots of difference size & shape has also been found. Human bones & parts of skeletons were also found at the burial site. Presence of other burnt bones as well as that of cattle near burial area indicates the practice of animal sacrifice during funeral ceremony. Beads of various types were also found near burial site.

Most of the potsherds found are sturdy red ware, with exception of one which is gray ware & few which are decorated. Three graffiti marks have been noticed on the potsherds. Preliminary observations indicate striking similarity with late Harappan period. Additionally storage jars, bowls and dish-on-stands has also been found.

In one of the sites a floor with mud wall was found while at another site four successive layers of floors in house were found out.
