= Raja Mahendra Aridaman Singh =

Indian politician

MLA in Legislative Assembly of Uttar Pradesh
- In office March 2012 – March 2017
- Preceded by: Madhusdan Sharma
- Succeeded by: Rani Pakshalika Singh
- In office February 2002 – May 2007
- Succeeded by: Madhusdan Sharma
- In office October 1996 – May 2002
- In office December 1993 – October 1995
- In office June 1991 – December 1992
- In office December 1989 – April 1991
- Preceded by: Amar Chand
- Constituency: Bah (Assembly constituency)

Personal details
- Born: 23 January 1957 (age 69) Agra district
- Party: Bharatiya Janta Party
- Spouse: Rani Pakshalika Singh
- Children: 1
- Parent: Mahendra Ripudaman Singh (father)
- Education: St. John's College, Agra
- Profession: Farmer and politician

Raja Mahendra Aridaman Singh is an Indian politician and a member of the Sixteenth Legislative Assembly of Uttar Pradesh in India. He represents the Bah constituency of Uttar Pradesh and was a member of the Samajwadi Party political party until 15 January 2017 when he joined the rival Bharatiya Janata Party.

== Early life and education ==
Singh was born in Royal Rajput family of Agra district. His father Mahendra Ripudaman Singh was also an MLA for four terms from Bah. He attended the St. John's College, Agra, and attained a Master of Commerce degree.

== Political career ==
Singh has been a MLA for six terms. He represented the Bah constituency. He is a member of the Bharatiya Janata Party political party. He had been also a member of samajwadi party for five years, from 2012 to 2017. On 15 January 2017, Singh joined the Bharatiya Janata Party along with his wife.

== Posts held ==
#	From	To	Position	Comments
01	2012	2017	Member, 16th Legislative Assembly	
02	2002	2007	Member, 14th Legislative Assembly	
03	1996	2002	Member, 13th Legislative Assembly	
04	1993	1995	Member, 12th Legislative Assembly	
05	1991	1992	Member, 11th Legislative Assembly	
06	1989	1991	Member, 10th Legislative Assembly	

== See also ==
- Bah (Assembly constituency)
- Sixteenth Legislative Assembly of Uttar Pradesh
- Uttar Pradesh Legislative Assembly
