= Panwari =

Village in Uttar Pradesh, India

- Village
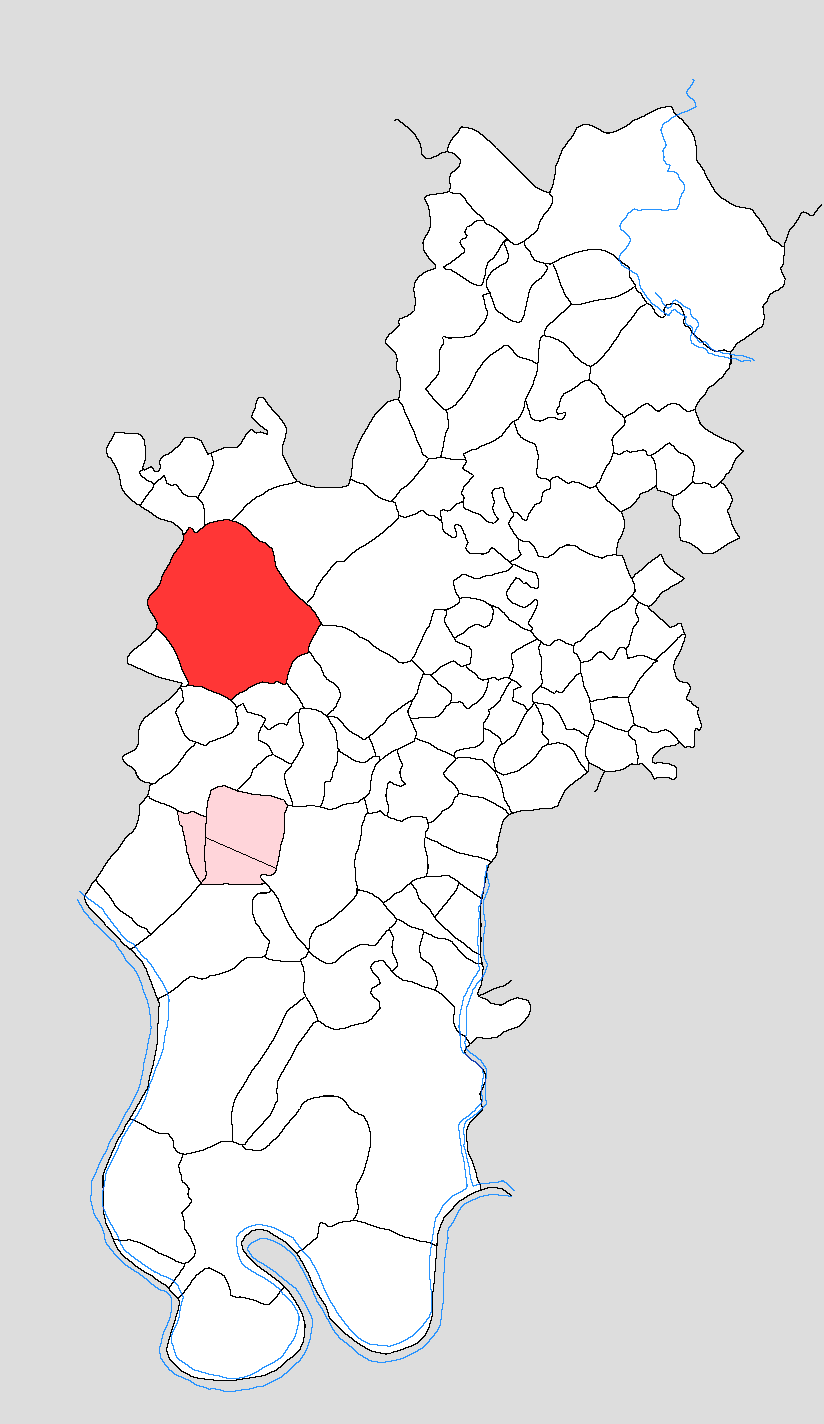
- Map showing Panwari in Tundla block

- Location in Uttar Pradesh, India
- Coordinates: 27.26479°N 78.23286°E
- Country: India
- State: Uttar Pradesh
- District: Firozabad
- Tehsil: Tundla

Area
  - Total: 15.474 km^{2} (5.975 sq mi)

Population (2011)
  - Total: 10,253
  - Density: 662.60/km^{2} (1,716.1/sq mi)
- Time zone: UTC+5:30 (IST)
- PIN: 283204

Panwari (Panwāṛī) is a large village in Tundla block of Firozabad district, Uttar Pradesh. In addition to the main village site, the village lands also include around a dozen outlying hamlets. As of 2011, Panwari has a population of 10,253, in 1,515 households. Village was named after the Panwar clan of Rajputs.

== Name ==
The name Panwāṛī comes directly from the ordinary compound noun panwāṛī, which means a garden or other place where betel is grown. (Pan- is a variant of the usual Hindustani form of the word, pān, that is found when used as a prefix.) The word is ultimately derived from Sanskrit parṇa + vāṭikā. Another place with the same name and etymology is Panwari in Hamirpur district.

== History ==
Sometime before the 1800s, Panwari was held by local Muslim landowners, who built a small mud fort to the west of the main village site. Around the year 1800, the village was sold by auction and bought by a British plantation owner named Baillie, who established an indigo factory at Panwari. The village was later sold to a man named Gobind Parshad, who had previously been a servant in Baillie's employ; Gobind Parshad's descendants were still the main landowners in Panwari a century later. At that point, around the turn of the 20th century, Panwari was described as a large agricultural village which consisted of 16 distinct settlements (the main village site along with 15 outlying hamlets). Its population as of 1901 was 3,006. Administratively, it was part of pargana Itimadpur.

== Demographics ==
As of 2011, Panwari had a population of 10,253, in 1,515 households. This population was 53.4% male (5,473) and 46.6% female (4,780). The 0-6 age group numbered 1,666 (870 male and 796 female), making up 16.2% of the total population. 2,568 residents were members of Scheduled Castes, or 25.0% of the total.

The 1981 census recorded Panwari (as "Pamari") as having a population of 6,430 people (3,631 male and 2,799 female), in 1,052 households and 1,032 physical houses.

The 1961 census recorded Panwari as comprising 14 hamlets, with a total population of 4,344 people (2,358 male and 1,986 female), in 692 households and 651 physical houses. The area of the village was given as 3,819 acres and it had a post office and medical practitioner at that point.

== Infrastructure ==
As of 2011, Panwari had 3 primary schools; it did not have any healthcare facilities. Drinking water was provided by hand pump; there were no public toilets. The village had a sub post office but no public library; there was at least some access to electricity for all purposes. Streets were made of both kachcha and pakka materials.
