= Babulal Chaudhary =

Indian Bharatiya Janata Party politician

Chaudhary Babulal
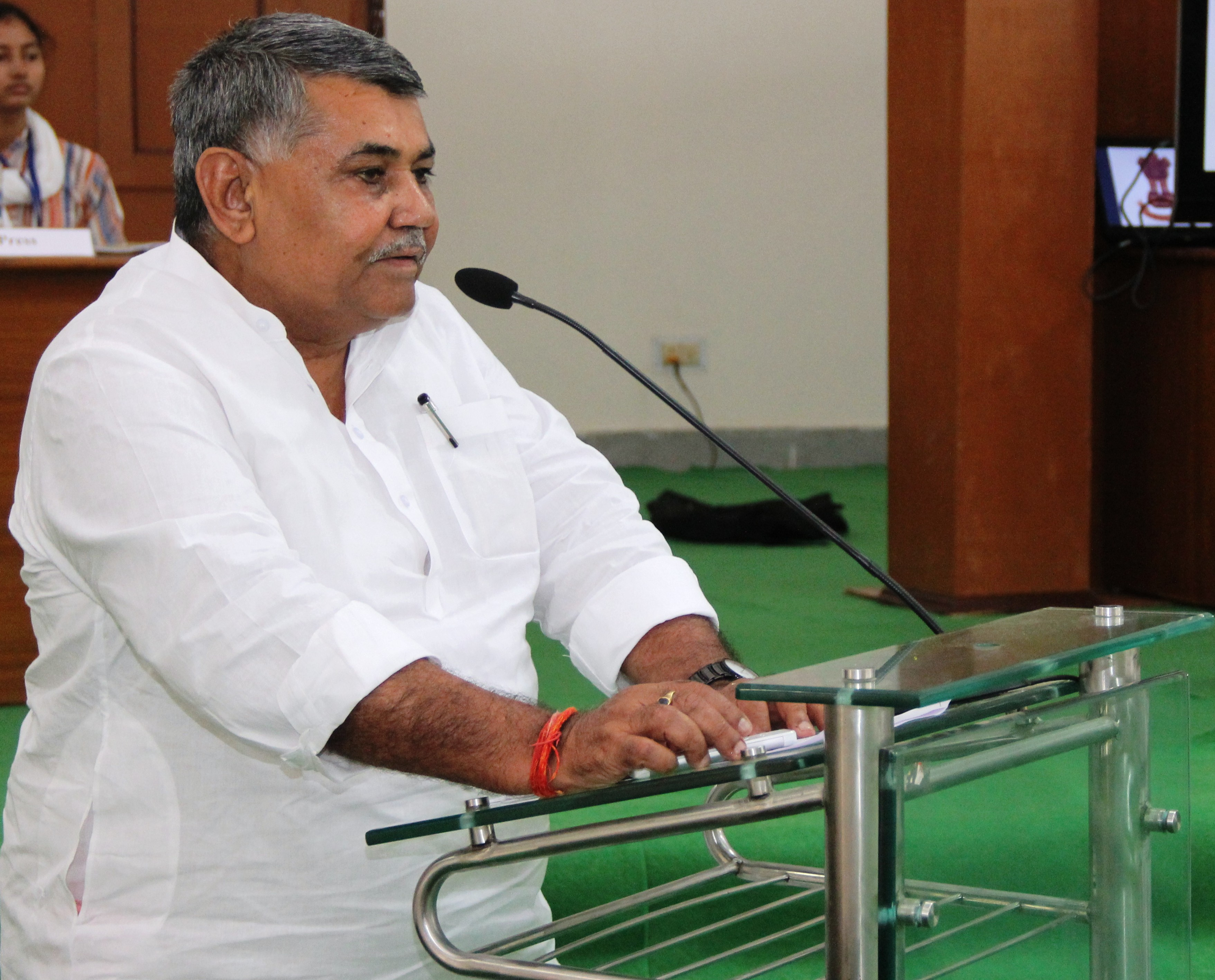
- Chaudhary Babulal delivering a speech at Youth Parliament in Agra on 14 September 2014

Member of the Uttar Pradesh legislative assembly
- Constituency: Fatehpur Sikri

Personal details
- Born: 2 July 1968 (age 58) Agra, United Provinces, India
- Party: Bharatiya Janta Party (BJP) (BJP)
- Parents: Shree prakash chaudary; Kiran Devi
- Education: Raja Balwant Singh College, Agra
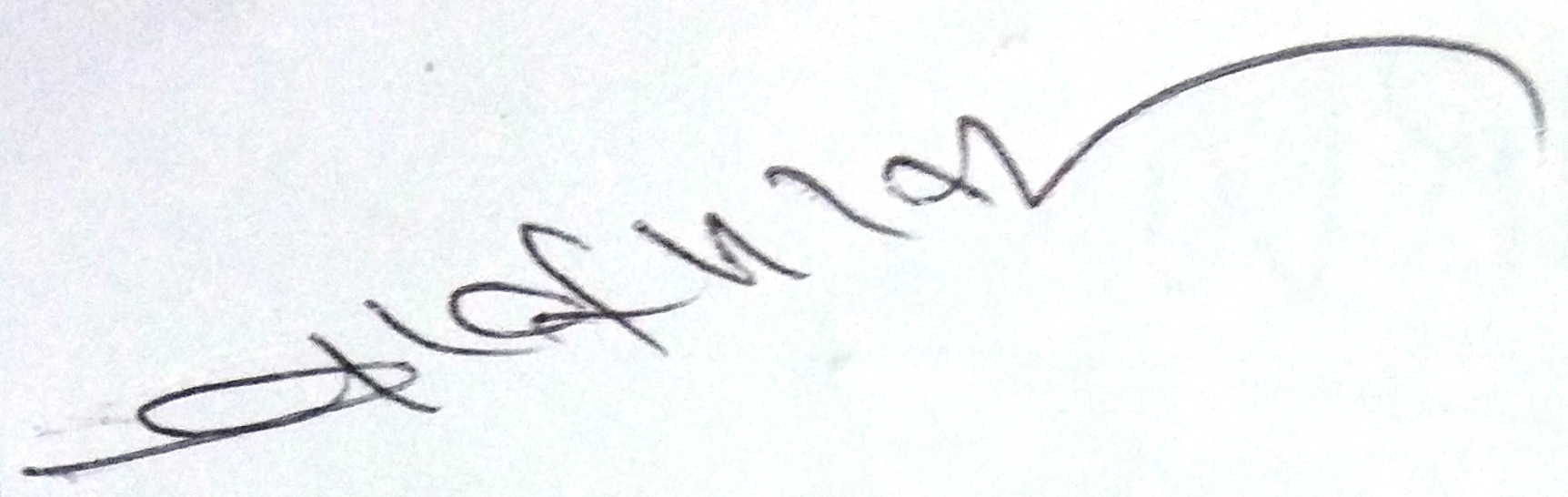
- Signature

Chaudhary Babulal (born 2 July 1968) is an Indian politician from the state of Uttar Pradesh. He served as a Member of Parliament (MP) for the Fatehpur Sikri (Uttar Pradesh) constituency of the 16th Lok Sabha. As a former member of the Bhartiya Janta Party (BJP), currently in Congress , he has been one of the prominent Jat leaders of western Uttar Pradesh for more than three decades.

== Personal life ==
Chaudhary was born on 2 July 1948 in the village of Panwari, near the city of Agra, in a farming family of Raghunath Singh and Kiran Devi.

He was educated at Raja Balwant Singh College, Agra to the Intermediate level.

Chaudhary is married to Mahaviri Devi, and they have five sons and one daughter. Their eldest son, Rameshwar Chaudhary, ran in the Lok Sabha general elections twice, for Agra in 1998 and Mathura in 1999, finishing in second place both times with 190,000 and 200,000 votes, respectively. He now operates a chain of degree colleges.

== Political career ==
Since childhood, he was influenced by Choudhary Charan Singh, the 5th Prime Minister of India and famous Jat leader from western Uttar Pradesh. He successfully contested the elections of Block Pramukh and Zila Panchayat Sadasya under the umbrella of the Panchayat General Election of the Uttar Pradesh Government. He was elected twice to the Uttar Pradesh Legislative Assembly (13th Legislative Assembly, 1996–2002 and then 14th Legislative Assembly, 2002–2007) as a Member of the Legislative Assembly for the Fatehpur Sikri constituency. He has served as a Cabinet Minister in the Government of Kumari Mayawati (2002–03) and then in the Government of Mulayam Singh Yadav (2003–2007). He has been the Minister for various government departments including the Ministry of Food Processing, Pension, Rashtriya Bhasha and Maddah Nishedh. He is currently a member of the Committee on Defence and the Committee on Food, Consumer Affairs and Public Distribution.
