= Haveli Sangeet =

Haveli Sangeet is a form of Hindustani classical music sung in havelis. The essential component is dhrupad. It originated in Govardhan, Mathura in Braj, northern India. It takes the form of devotional songs sung daily to Krishna by the Pushtimarg sect.

== History ==
Haveli Sangeet is another name for Hindu temple music practiced by the followers of Vaishnavism of Nathdwara in Rajasthan, Gujarat, India, and considered a part of a rich historical tradition. Pushtimarg temples are commonly called havelis because their design is based on the royal mansions of Rajasthan. Within the sect, a haveli (meaning 'house' or 'mansion') is considered to be where the primary deity resides. The haveli sangeet tradition believes that the music has no one other than Lord Krishna himself for an audience. Essentially a tribute to Krishna, its form includes devotional renditions like kirtans, bhajans, and bhava nritya, all related to religious worship. Although a mix of classical and folk music, the style is known by Nathdwara's musicians to closely related dhrupad and dhamar. Haveli Sangeet is commonly played at the havelis of Pushitmarg temples, like Radha Vallabh of Vrindaban, Krishna of Nandgaon, Uttar Pradesh, and Sri Nathji of Nathdwara.

Over time, trained practitioners of Haveli Sangeet have decreased in numbers.

In Gujarat, one school of thought holds that Indian classical music has its origins in the Haveli Sangeet of Vallabhacharya, a pioneer in this genre. Vallabhacharya's and his son Shri Vitthalnath's disciples, who are known as the Ashtachap, were the pioneer writers and singers of this genre. Four of the poets were initiated by Vallabhacharya (Surdas, Kumbhandas, Paramanandadas, and Krishnadas Adhikari) and the other four by Vitthalnathji (Nandadas, Chaturbhujadas, Govindswami, and Chittswami). Not only were the poets exceptional composers and singers, but they were exemplary devotees of Shrinathji.

The history of Indian classical music has it that the Vaishnavs of Nathdwara were the ones to uphold this sect founded by Vallabh Acharya.

=== Repertoire ===
Sectarian tradition associates each darshan with an Ashtachap poet: Parmananddas (Mangal), Nanddas (Shringar), Govindswami (Gval), Kumbhandas (Raj Bhog), Surdas (Utthapan), Chaturbhujdas (Bhog), Chhitswami (Arati), and Krishnadas (Shayan). However, field analysis has shown that this alignment is not strictly followed. Temple musicians choose from a broader collection of over twenty composers, including both Ashtachap poets and later poets, focused primarily on ragas and seasons rather than the fixed authors.

== Features ==
Haveli sangeet is considered by Nathdwara musicians to be closely related to classical dhrupad-dhamar, both having developed out of the medieval prabandha form and using Braj Bhasha verse divided into sthayi, antara, sanchari, and abhog. Unlike concert dhrupad, which devotes extensive time to an unmetered, non-lexical prelude (alap), haveli singing usually limits alap to a brief introductory phrase of roughly eight seconds, or omits it entirely. The performance emphasizes the devotional and poetic meaning of the song (pada) over abstract modal development.

While classical dhrupad favors the 12-beat chautala, haveli sangeet relies predominantly on 14-beat dhamar tala and 7-beat rupak tala, which together account for roughly three-quarters of the temple repertoire. Other metric cycles used during liturgical worship include the 10-beat charchari tala and the 8-beat adi tala. The faster, swinging tempo of seven- and fourteen-beat talas distinguishes temple music from the more measured pacing of courtly dhrupad and reflects the joyful themes of Krishna's exploits.

Instrumentation inside the haveli takes place in several different parts of the haveli like the inner shrine (nij mandir), musician's alley (kirtankar gali), darshan hall (doltivari), and the lotus square (kamal chauk). The raised area in front of the deity's shrine (Mani kota) is typically where musicians will stand during the public darshan time period. Accompaniment is provided by the pakhavaj drum, the plucked stick zither (rudra veena), the sarangi, the drone tanpura (used occasionally), and the harmonium. The transverse bamboo flute (bansuri) is excluded from temple ensembles because sectarian custom treats the instrument as a sacred emblem reserved exclusively for Krishna.

== Daily cycle ==
In the Pushtimarg tradition, haveli sangeet is performed as devotional service (seva) across the eight daily liturgical viewings (darshans) of the child-deity (svarup): Mangal (awakening), Shringar (dressing), Gval (taking cattle to pasture), Raj Bhog (midday meal), Utthapan (waking from siesta), Bhog (afternoon meal), Sandhya Arati (evening lamp ceremony), and Shayan (retiring to sleep). Together with eight pre-darshan periods and one post-darshan period, music is required around seventeen times per day in the Shrinathji temple.
