= Vilwamangalam Swamiyar =

Indian saint

Vilwamangalam Swamiyar was a saint that lived in India. Swamiyar was renowned all over India. Bengalis believe that he was born in Bengal while Odias believe in Odisha, though tradition in Kerala implies that he belonged to Panniyoor village.

Krishna Karnamrita is his devotional masterpiece, written under an unspecified name "Leelasukan". The second Vilwamangalam is closely associated with several famous temples in Kerala such as Thiruvarppu, and Karthyayani Devi Temple, Cherthala. Due to the popularity of Krishna Karnamrita the author became a legendary figure, and every part, province of India claimed him for itself.

== God's visitations ("Seeing Gods") ==
Once, on a Vrishchikam Kaarthika day (Kaarthika star-day of the Malayalam month Vrishchikam), when he went to Vadakkunnathan Temple in Thrissur, the deity was "missing". On his stepping out of the temple, he found the god sitting on the south wall facing south; apparently waiting to watch Kumaaranalloor Kaarthiaayani's arrival after her bath and fully attired. Ever since, a Pooja is performed on the south wall on the Kaarthika of Vrishchikam every year.

On an Ashtami day, he visited Vaikom Temple but could not find the deity in the sanctorum. When he carefully searched, the lord was found disguised as an old Brahmin sitting and eating among a crowd of Brahmins enjoying a Sadhya next to a pillar in the north "Chuttambalam". Since then, during every feast in the temple, a plantain leaf is placed near that pillar with all dishes of the feast served.

During an Utsavam in Ambalappuzha Sri Krishna Temple, Swamiyar found the missing god serving feast to the Maarars in the "Naatakasaala" (drama hall). Even to this day, the Naatakasaala feast for Maarars is given much importance owing to the supposed divine presence.

On one of his sojourns, while approaching a forest area near Cherthala, the Swamiyar came face-to-face with seven divine women (angels). On approaching them, one ran away but fell into a muddy part of a pond. When he extricated her, her hair was full of mud, and that was the reason for the place to get the name "Cherthala", and the deity Cherthala Kaarthiaayani.

He is also said to have seen the deity at the site of Eravikulangara Temple.

If these legends are to be believed, there must have been more than one Vilwamangalam Swamiyar, since historically these events must have occurred in different periods. Ulloor S. Parameswara Iyer believes that there were at least three Swamiyars.

== Sreekrishna Karnaamritham ==
Vilwamangalam Swamiyar had a local Ambalavasi for Sambandam, whom he loved dearly. He would visit his wife across the river every night overcoming any obstacles. On a stormy night, he took off with a torch ("choottu", lighted bunched palm leaves) and managed to cross the river using what appeared to be a log with a rope at one end. After crossing the river, he tied the log to a tree using the rope. Hearing about the trouble he had taken to visit her every night, she told him that he would have obtained Moksha, had he diverted all that energy and single-mindedness to pray to (please) God.

These words of his wife really shook him and there was a revelation in him, which led him to create his devotional masterpiece — Shree Krishna Karnamrutam, which he wrote under an assumed name "Leelasukan". Next morning he left his wife telling her that she was henceforth his mother and teacher. At the river-bank he found that the log he had used the previous night was actually the dead body of a man, and the rope - a dead python. After reaching home and taking bath, he arranged for Punyaha to be performed on him, and soon thereafter he sought Sannyasa and became the "Vilwamangalathu Swamiyar". His mother was Neeli and father Damodaran.

== Vilwamangalam Illam ==
The illom of the first Swamiyar was located in Sukapuram and it is non-existent now.

Regarding the second Swamiyar, there are several versions as to where his illom is located - Tavanur, Puthenchira, Kasaragod and other places have stated claims.

=== Thavanur ===
One version claims that Vilwamangalam is the same as "Vella" Illam of Tavanur (from "Thapanoor", the village of the "Thapaswi", the saint). The compound and basement remnant of this Illam exist nearby even today. Also in the vicinity on the north bank of Bharaathapuzha is Thirunavaya Navamukunda Temple apparently built for Swamiyar's mother to pray to Vishnu during her old age. Even today, on the Vella Illam basement, "Yogeeswara Pooja" is performed in a grand way on the Sraadhham day (death anniversary) of the Swamiyar, adding to the belief that Vilwamangalam is here. The Swamiyar's writings about Mookkuthala Bhagavathy, Sukapuram Dakshinaamoorthy and Thriprangottappan appear to substantiate this view. Ulloor S Parameswara Iyer suggests the original Sanskrit name would have been "Kodandamangalam" which translates to "Villumangalam" and changed to Vilwamangalam and hence to Vella.

=== Puthenchira ===
Some believe that his "Poorvaasramam" (pre-sannyaasam home) was in Puthenchira, between Kodungallur and Mala in Mukundapuram Taluk of Thrissur district. He is said to belong to one branch of the Vella family of Panniyoor which settled there, and later this family as well as their property got merged into Mechery Mana of Paravur. The Paaramel Thrikkovil temple of Puthnchira is said to be that of Sreekrishnan, Vilwamangalam's "Paradevatha". A homestead of 57 cents near Anappara was set apart as Vilwamangalam's, which continues to have rituals. The paddy fields there are still known as Vilwamangalam "Paadam".

=== Kasaragod ===
The people of Brahmapuram Desam of Kasaragod district are of the opinion that Vilwamangalam belongs to that place. They believe that it was in their Ananthapura Lake Temple that Sreekrishnan chided the Swamiyar to meet again in Ananthan forest. They also claim some connection between the Swamiyar and a temple near Kaithapram, and that the spring in the Theertham was generated by him.

=== Olayambadi ===
Meenkulam sri krishna temple (8 km away from kaithapram). Claims that, on the way back from kaveri visit, the swamiyar came to the wild flat rocky area in the evening(where the temple and pond situated now). There was no source of water at the place to take bath for the swamiyar. Ardent krishna devotee- swamiyar prayed krishna for the water and krishna appeared and asked him to close his eyes to get the solution. Then the krishna enlarged his body, with his right bare foot stepped on the rocky place and generated spring in the foot printed deep surface and it became like a pond ( still people can see the 15 feet length/10 feet depth foot print under water rock surface-like a deep muddy foot print). As per the swamiyar's concern about the purity of water without fish, Krishna created large fish(still visible) and asked him to take bath and do Pooja. The place is said to have got its name “Meenkulam” (meaning Fishpond in Malayalam) from that incident. Later a temple was built there. Vilwamangalam Swamiyar Mattham situated near to the temple with an ancient large cave. Believes that centuries ago vilwamangalam or other followers may have done meditation in this cave. Variety of pooja pots also were excavated from this cave decades ago.

=== Other claims ===
During his stay in the Mattham at Trichambaram, after gifting Vadakke Mattham and properties to Othanmaar Mattham, Vilwamangalam reached Vishnumangalam temple near Edaneer Mattham, before starting off to Banaras. He stayed in Edaneer Mattham as requested by the Yadava families of Trichambaram, and under the care of those local families who later took up Sannyasa, apparently from Vilwamangalam Swamiyar.

These events took place around 500 years ago. There may have been twelve Swamiyars there and ten could have been given up for adoption to Perumpadappu. Ulloor S. Parameswara Iyer and others state that there have been three from Vilwamangalam family had become Swamiyars, and that one of them might have offered the afore-mentioned Sannyaasa.

There is one Vilwamangalam family listed among the Saagara Dwijans. It is likely that his disciples might have stayed with him and perhaps later they began to be referred to as Vilwamangalam.

== Teachers ==
One of the Leelasukan's teachers was named Eesaana Devan. Somagiri an expert in Thaanthrik traditions may also be considered Leelaasukan's Guru (teacher). Ramachandra Budhendran and Paapaayallaya Soori, both from Andhra Pradesh, were his commentators.

== Works ==
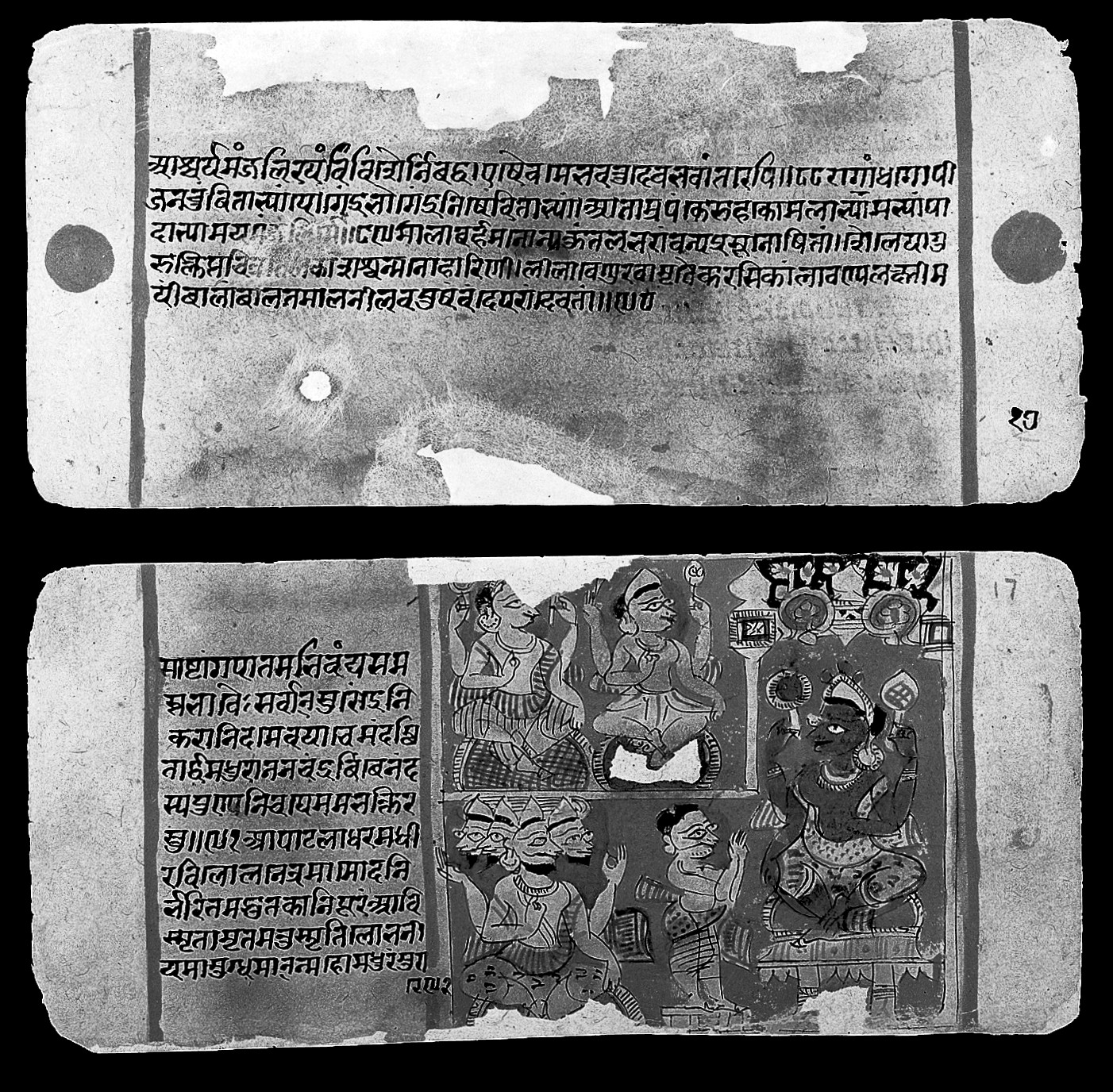
Bilvamangala's Balagopalastuti; folio 16 verso - 17 recto

1. Shree Krishna Karnamrutam
2. Sreechinham
3. Purushakaaram
4. Abhinava-Kausthubha-Maala
5. Dakshinaamoorthy-Sthavam
6. Kaalavadha Kaavyam
7. Durgaasthuthi
8. Baalakrishna Sthothram
9. Baalagopaala Sthuthy
10. Sreekrishna Varadaashtakam
11. Vrindaavana Sthothram
12. Bhaavanaamukuram
13. Raamachandraashtakam
14. Ganapathy Sthothram
15. Anubhavaashtakam
16. Mahaakaalaashtakam
17. Kaarkotakaashtakam
18. Krishnaleelaa-Vinodam
19. Sankara-Hridayamgamaa
20. Subanda-Saamraajyam
21. Thinganda-Saamraajyam
22. Kramadeepika

A grand total of 22 works.

== In popular culture ==
The legend of the 14th-century poet (who has also been identified with Surdas) and Chintamani has been adapted several times in Indian cinema. These films include: Bilwamangal or Bhagat Soordas (1919) by Rustomji Dhotiwala, Bilwamangal (1932), Chintamani (1933) by Kallakuri Sadasiva Rao, Chintamani (1937) by Y. V. Rao, Bhakta Bilwamangal (1948) by Shanti Kumar, Bilwamangal (1954) by D. N. Madhok, Bhakta Bilwamangal (1954) by Pinaki Bhushan Mukherji, Chintamani (1956) by P. S. Ramakrishna Rao, Chintamani (1957) by M.N. Basavarajaiah, Chilamboli (1963) by G. K. Ramu, Bilwamangal (1976) by Gobinda Roy, Vilvamangal Ki Pratigya (1996) by Sanjay Virmani.
