= Vasudevapuram Tavanur =

Hindu Temple in Kerala, India

Coordinates: 10°51′5″N 75°59′14″E

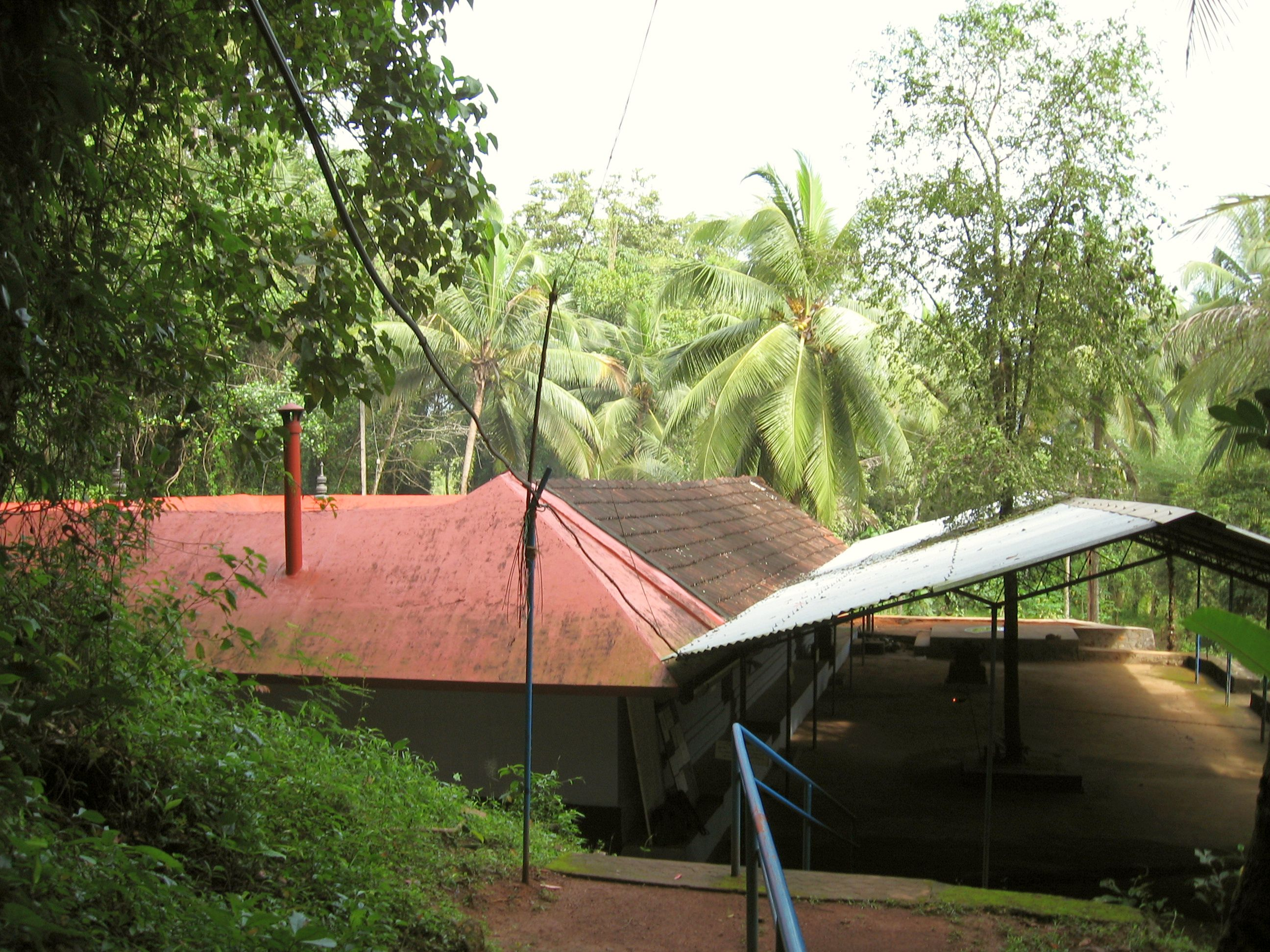
Vasudevapuram temple

Sri Vasudevapuram Temple is one of three ancient temples (Maha-Kshetram) on the Southern bank of holy river Bharathapuzha. It sits east of the other two, Maha-Shiva Temple and Brahma temple. These temples along with the famous Thirunavaya Maha-Vishnu temple across the river form the trilogy in Sanatana Dharma). Tavanur is called Muvaankara (മൂവ്വാങ്കര). Brahma, Vishnu, and Shiva are the presiding deities, so it was initially known as Muvalankara, and then Muvaankara. Vasudevapuram Tavanur is situated in the middle of a wooded area resembling that of Sabarimala.

== History ==
Vasudevapuram Tavanur belonged to Maravanchery Mana and was later handed to a registered trust of devotees. Sri Vasudevapuram temple was built for Vilwamangalam Swamiyar's mother for offering prayer during her old age. Vilwamangalam Swamiyar was so great a devotee of Sri Krishna that he was said to possess the ability to "see" him. He was instrumental in setting up temples in Kerala such as Thiruvananthapuram, Thiruvaarppu, and Cherthala Kaarthiaayani. The Krishna idol (murti) made of jet black stone is in the form of the youthful Krishna with butter in both hands. It is believed by devotees to have been the idol worshiped by Vilwamangalam Swamiyar.

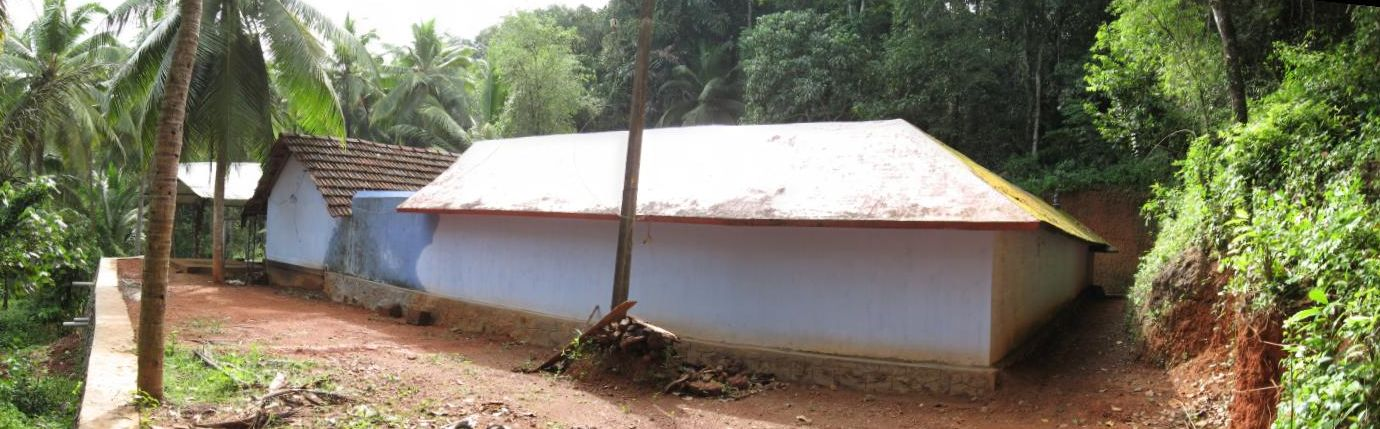
Vsudevapuram-Panoramic view

== Legends ==
As a child Krishna appeared to Vilwamangalam Swamiyar, a mahatma who was a devout Brahmin and a yathi varyan. He worshiped Krishna in child form. After the disappearance of his mortal body, the idol of the youthful Krishna was installed in the temple and the village was dedicated to Krishna. This temple was renamed Vasudevapuram. Later a devotee of Lord Shiva brought a Shiva lingam and installed it in the temple for his worship. Ganapathi and Shasta idols were also installed.

== Festivals ==
- Ashtami Rohini: The birthday of Lord Krishna, celebrated in Chingam (August–September) . It is celebrated every year with cultural programs, procession, and special poojas including Guru pooja (Yatheeswara pooja). The devotees are given a special feast.
- Niraputhari: This takes place in the month of Chingam. Puthari means "new rice". It is the formal beginning of the use of rice after the new harvest season. It is a tradition in Sanatana Dharma that any food, item or work is offered (dedicated) to Lord before it is used. Puthari payasam is offered to Lord.
- Kuchela Dinam: The first Wednesday of the month of Dhanu (December) is celebrated. It is based on the belief that on this day Kuchela, an ardent devotee of Lord Krishna, offered Avil (parched rice) to him and in return attained eternal bliss and material prosperity. Avil offering is considered auspicious on this day.

== See also ==
- Temples of Kerala
