= Runakta =

- town
- Interactive map of Runakta
- Country: India
- State: Uttar Pradesh

Languages
  - Official: Hindi
- Time zone: UTC+5:30 (IST)

Runakta is a small town on the outskirts of Agra, Uttar Pradesh, India. It is situated on the NH19 (under new National Highways naming scheme published by NHAI in 2010), earlier NH2, popularly known as the Grand Trunk Road.

Runakta is known specially for its association with the great poet Sur, famous as Surdas, an ardent Krishna devotee. Runakta is the starting point of what is called as Brij Bhoomi or the land of Lord Krishna.
