= Chintamani =

Chintamani may refer to:

- Chintamani or Cintamani (jewel), a wish-fulfilling jewel in both Hindu and Buddhist traditions
- The Tamil epic Cīvaka Cintāmaṇi, one of the five great Tamil epics of 5th century

== Places ==
- Chintamani, Karnataka, a town in Karnataka, India
  - Chintamani (Vidhana Sabha constituency), an Assembly seat in Karnataka, India
- Chintamani, Tiruchirappalli, a neighborhood in Tamil Nadu, India
- Chintamani Kar Bird Sanctuary, a wildlife sanctuary in West Bengal, India
- Chintamani Temple, Theur, a Hindu Ganesha shrine in near Pune in Maharashtra, India

== Films ==
- Chintamani (1933 film), a Telugu film by K. S. Rao
- Chintamani (1937 film), a Tamil film by Y. V. Rao
- Chintamani (1956 film), a Telugu film by P. S. Ramakrishna Rao
- Chintamani (2014 film), a Marathi film by Sangeeta Balchandran

== People ==
- Chintamani Nagesa Ramachandra Rao (born 1934), Indian chemist
- Chintamani Tryambak Khanolkar (1930–1976), Indian writer in the Marathi language
- Chintamani Panigrahi (1922–2000), Indian activist, political and social leader from Orissa
- C. Y. Chintamani (1880–1941), Indian editor, journalist and politician

== Others ==
- Chintamani (newspaper), a Tamil weekly newspaper, published in Colombo
