= Aṣṭachāp =

Group of eight devout poets who were disciples of Vallabhacharya

Ashtachap (meaning "8 seals" in Hindi) is a group of 8 devout poets who were disciples of Vallabhacharya and his son Vitthalnath.They sang Haveli Sangeet, a devotional musical tradition of prayers, praises, kirtans and musical storytelling about Shri Krishna's leelas within the Pushtimarg sampradaya that Vallabhacharya founded. Vitthalnath formally recognized the group by giving the name, Ashtachap.

From about 1549 to 1578, the poets lived together under Vitthalnath's guidance serving through kirtan at the Shrinathji temple on mount Govardhan. The group was established in 1565 with the foundation of Pushtimarg. The poet Sūrdās was the most well known member of the group the others being, Kumbhandas, Krishnadas Adhikari, Paramānanddās, Nandadas, Chaturbhujdas, Govindswami and Chitasvami.

== Background ==
The Pushtimarg was established by the philosopher Vallabhacharya (1479–1531), who taught a theology of shuddhadvaita (pure non-dualism) and intense personal devotion (prema-bhakti) to Krishna. Within this framework, devotional service (seva) to Krishna's image in the temple (mandir) was understood as participation in his eternal divine play (nitya lila). Vallabha composed his works in Sanskrit, but he and his successors recognized that vernacular song was the best way to bring worshipers together.

It was Vallabha's son and successor Vitthalnath who gave the sampradaya its distinctive institutional forms.

== Formation ==
Vitthalnath selected eight poet-musicians from the sampradaya and formally recognized them with his blessing. This act of recognition gave the group its name: Ashtachap which translated to "eight seals". In Pushtimarg theology, the eight poets are also venerated as the earthly manifestations of Krishna's eight eternal companions (ashtasakhis) in his divine play, and are symbolically assigned to the eight compass points of the mandala surrounding Mount Govardhan.

The eight poets lived as contemporaries under Vitthalnath's guidance from approximately 1549-1578, serving through devotional singing (kirtan) at the Shrinathji mandir on Mount Govardhan in Braj.

The earliest mention of Ashtachap as a defined group is found in Varta literature which were composed by Gokulnath in around 1610. Gokulnath was the fourth son of Vitthalnath. Modern scholars have argued that the group was likely not called the Ashtachap at the time, but that it was a retrospectively created category within the Vallabha tradition. This grouping of eight was achieved through a literary arrangement where four were placed at the end of Chaurasi Vaishnavanki Varta (the hagiographies of Vallabha's 84 disciples) and the other four were placed in the opening of Do Sau Bavan Vaishnavanki Varta (collection of 252 disciples).

== The eight poets ==
The group of poets is divided into two generations. The four disciples of Vallaba, Surdas, Kumbhandas, Paramanandadas, and Krishnadas Adhikari are known to be a part of the first generation. The four disciples of Vitthalnath, Nandadas, Chaturbhujadas, Govindswami, and Chhitswami are known as the second generation.

=== Surdas ===
Surdas is universally regarded as "the exemplary poet of Krishna" and "the epitome of poetic artistry in Braja bhasha". Surdas met Vallabhacharya for the first time in a small village called Gaoghat. He was beautiful singer, but was singing self-deprecating poems. Vallabha persuaded Surdas to give up the self-denigration and to instead, sing and enjoy songs of Krishna's divine play (lila). Surdas is traditionally described as being blind from birth, but spiritually, he is the poet who "sees" Krishna most clearly

Surdas's collection of poems are known as the Sursagar. The work expresses emotions like vatsalya (parental love) and madhurya (sweetness), and features the celebrated Bhramargit (bee songs), in which the gopis argue against the impersonal philosophy of Uddhava. The earliest known manuscript of his poetry was said to be written in Fatehpur in 1582 and contains 239 poems. Additional manuscripts from the seventeenth century expanded the collection to more than 795 poems. Modern published editions of the Sursagar contain between 4,000-5,000 poems. The tradition claims that Surdas composed over 125,000 poems, though that number of poems have not been found today. His place within the Ashtachap is incomparable. He is listed first among both generations of poets and honored across North India for his contributions to Braj bhasha literature.

=== Kumbhandas ===
Unlike the other Ashtachap poets, Kumbhandas worked as a farmer throughout his life in a village called Jamunawas. He belonged to the Gorva Kshatriya family lineage. He was known for his intense detachment (vairagya) from worldly ambitions. Some examples include declining a king's offerings of a golden mirror, a thousand gold coins, and even an entire village grant, choosing to live a simple life filled with devotion amidst his fieldwork.

Once, the Mughal emperor Akbar asked Kumbhandas to perform at his court in Fatehpur Sikri. Kumbhandas is said to have composed a verse expressing his displeasure because the trip distracted him from remembering Krishna and was of no spiritual worth. His compositions mostly focused on the divine couple (yugal-swarup), Radha-Krishna.

=== Paramanandadas ===
Paramanandadas was a Kanyakubja Brahmin from the ancient city of Kannauj. He took refuge of Vallabhacharya in a village called Adel. He is one of Vallabhacharya's most celebrated devotees. Vitthalnath is said to have said, "There are two oceans in the Pushtimarg. One is Surdas and the other is Paramanandadas." Paramanandadas was the only member of the Ashtachap to be compared with Surdas, a testament to the high regard in which his poetry is held within the tradition.

His collection of poems are known as the Paramanand-Sagar. His padas (poems) are known for their expression of parental love (vatsalya) and viraha (separation). Within the tradition, he is known as the manifestation of Subala, one of Krishna's ashta-sakhas (eight friends). Among the first generation poets, Paramanandadas is second to Surdas in terms of volume and variety of surviving compositions and poetry. The Paramanand-Sagar contains around 2,000 padas.

=== Krishnadas Adhikari ===
Krishnadas grew up as a Kunbi Patel from a village called Chilotra in Gujarat. He was known as 'Adhikari' because he served as the chief administrator and led all management at the Shrinathji mandir.

Within the tradition, Krishnadas is considered a senior disciple because he was a direct disciple of Vallabhacharya. His compositions are well known as describing Krishna's rasa-lila with the gopis, the majesty of the Yamuna river, and the greatness of mount Govardhan. He is known to be the manifestation of Madhumangala, one of Krishna's ashta-sakhas (eight friends). Vitthalnath is said to have described his poetry as "unique and flawless."

=== Nandadas ===
Nandadas was a Sanadhya Brahmin from the village Rampur. He stood out for his deep scholarship and command of Braj vocabulary. The tradition believes him to be Tulsidas's nephew, though modern scholars reject this fact. Nandadas first met Vitthalnath while traveling to Dwarka. He stopped by Gokul and took initiation into the sampraday.

His major work, the Rasa-Panchadhyayi, is a Braj translation of the five ras chapters of the Bhagavata Puran. His compositions are known for bringing complex Sanskrit poetic techniques into vernacular padas. Prabhudayal Mital ranks him as first among the second-generation Ashtachap poets for his technical skill.

=== Chaturbhujdas ===
Chaturbhujdas was the youngest son of Khumbhandas, a first generation Ashtachap poet. He grew up in the devotional environment of the Pushtimarg mandir in Govardhan where he learned singing and poetry from his father and Vitthalnath.

His compositions are well-known for depicting devotion to the child Krishna (bal-bhav), the devotional aesthetics of love and beauty (shringar), and Krishna's rasalila. During his final years, he composed verses on the importance and glory of his gurus (guru mahima). His major works are compiled within the Dvadasa Yasa, Hit Ju Ko Mangal, and the Chaturbhuj-sagar, which is a large anthology of compositions grouped by ragas. Within the tradition, he is known as the manifestation of Krishna's ashta-sakha, Vishakha.

=== Govindswami ===
Govindswami was a Sanadhya Brahmin from the Antri region near Gwalior. He was renowned throughout the Braj region for his mastery of Hindustani classical music (North Indian classical music) even before joining the sampraday. He mostly composed padas in the dhrupad style which was the dominant form of classical music performed at the Mughal and Rajput courts. He was also known to compose in the vasant-dhamar form for padas describing the festival of Holi or on devotional love.

He was so talented that Tansen, a celebrated court musician of Emperor Akbar, sought to learn singing techniques from him. It is said that upon hearing Govindswami sing, Tansen reflected on the contrast between singing for worldly wealth and singing out of devotion to God. Though he wrote fewer compositions than his peers, each of his padas is celebrated for its musical brilliance. Govindswami is also known for planting the Kadamb khandi grove at Govardhan.

=== Chhitswami ===
Chhitswami was a Chaturvedi Brahmin from Mathura and before joining the sampraday, was a Shaiva devotee. He first approached Vitthalnath intending to slight him. He offered him a coconut filled with ash instead of a typical gift. When Vitthalnath cracked open the coconut, to Chhitswami's surprise, the coconut was filled with fresh coconut meat. This miracle led Chhitswami to become a disciple. Within the tradition, this story serves an example of guru kripa (guru's grace) in transforming the devotee. They believe the guru's grace to be unconditional regardless of the disciple's merit.

His padas focused on his guru Vitthalnath's qualities, the murti (sacred image) of Shrinathji, and the sacred landscapes of Braj. Although he wrote fewer compositions than the other Ashtachap poets, his padas on guru-bhakti (devotion to one's guru) are among the most well-known and sung.

== Haveli Sangeet ==
Haveli Sangeet refers to the devotional musical tradition associated with the Ashtachap poets. Derived from the word haveli (mansion or palace-like house), Haveli Sangeet is performed within Pushtimarg temples. A lot of their work drew inspiration from the North Indian Dhrupad style which was very popular during that time. Govindswami was recognized as a master of the Dhrupad style.

The Ashtachap poets primarily wrote their compositions as padas. A pada is a short lyrical poem typically performed within the rules of a raga and rhythmic cycle (tala). It opens with a sthayi line followed by two-line couplets (dvipadi), four-line couplets (chatushpadi), or even longer verse structures.

Found manuscript anthologies of the Ashtachap poets organize padas under many classical ragas including Vibhas, Bhairav, Bilaval, Todi, Dhananshri, Gujri, Ramkali, Asavari, Sarang, Malav, Kalyan, Kedar, Basant, and many others.

== Role in Pushtimarg worship ==
Nitya seva or daily temple service is a core principle of Pushtimarg. They are divided into eight devotional episodes which correspond to Krishna's daily routine: Mangala, Sringara, Gvala, Rajabhoga, Utthapana, Bhoga, Sandhya Arati, and Shayana. Vallabhacharya instructed the Ashtachap poets to compose and sing padas suited to the time of day before the murti of Shrinathji.

== Literary Significance ==
The work of the first generation Ashtachap poets play a large role in the rise of Braj bhasha literature. No significant Braj bhasha poets are recorded before Surdas and Paramanandadas. By requiring these compositions to be sung in Pushtimarg mandirs, the Braj bhasha was elevated to a language on par with the ones used in Mughal and Rajput courts.

The Ashtachap poets worship God as being personally present with a form and attributes (saguna). Their poetry describes Krishna's lila and promotes loving devotion (prema bhakti), while many of their padas argue against impersonal monism (advait), the path of knowledge (jnan), and ascetic yoga.

== Legacy ==
The Ashtachap poets' legacy lives on. Pushtimarg devotees still sing their compositions and padas in their mandirs. Bhakti poetry in this style "is sung and recited in homes, in the bazaar, in temples, on cassettes and CDs, in movies, in singing groups, in the fields."

The Ashtachap poets perfected a style of composition of short, lyrical poems. This style spread across India and became a defining style of devotion music in both North and South India. Surdas is considered "the patron saint of Braj bhasha literature." His influence is still felt today where blind singers take the title of 'Surdas' as a way to pay tribute to the great poet. Many people will address a blind man as 'Surdas' regardless of whether he sings or not.
