= Chintaman =

Chintaman is a given name. Notable people with the name include:

- Suryakant Chintaman Chafekar AVSM, Air Vice Marshal, Senior Air and Administration Staff Officer in the Indian Air Force
- Chintaman D. Deshmukh, CIE, ICS (1896–1982), Indian civil servant, Governor of the Reserve Bank of India
- Ramchandra Chintaman Dhere (1930–2016), Marathi writer from Maharashtra, India
- Chintaman Rao Gautam (born 1899), member of parliament from Balaghat constituency of Madhya Pradesh, India
- Chintaman Vinayak Joshi (1892–1963), Marathi humorist and a researcher in Pali literature
- Narasimha Chintaman Kelkar (1872–1947), lawyer from Miraj as well as a writer
- Keshavkumar Chintaman Ketkar, Indian writer, politician and former journalist
- Chintaman Ganesh Kolhatkar (1891–1959), Marathi stage actor, director, producer, and playwright
- Chintaman Govind Pandit, OBE (1895–1991), Indian virologist, founder director of the Indian Council of Medical Research
- Chintaman Vinayak Vaidya (1861–1938), Marathi-language historian and writer from Maharashtra, India
- Chintaman Vanaga (1950–2018), Indian politician and Adivasi leader from Maharashtra

== See also ==
- Chintaman Ganesh railway station, small railway station in Ujjain, Madhya Pradesh, near the Chintaman Ganesh Temple
- Chintaman Ganesh Temple, Ujjain, the biggest temple of Lord Ganesha in Ujjain of Madhya Pradesh, India
- Chintamani (disambiguation)
