= Mariam Thresia Chiramel =

Indian religious sister and saint (1876–1926)

Saint Mariam Thresia Mankidiyan ܡܪܬܝ ܡܪܝܡ ܬܪܣܝܐ
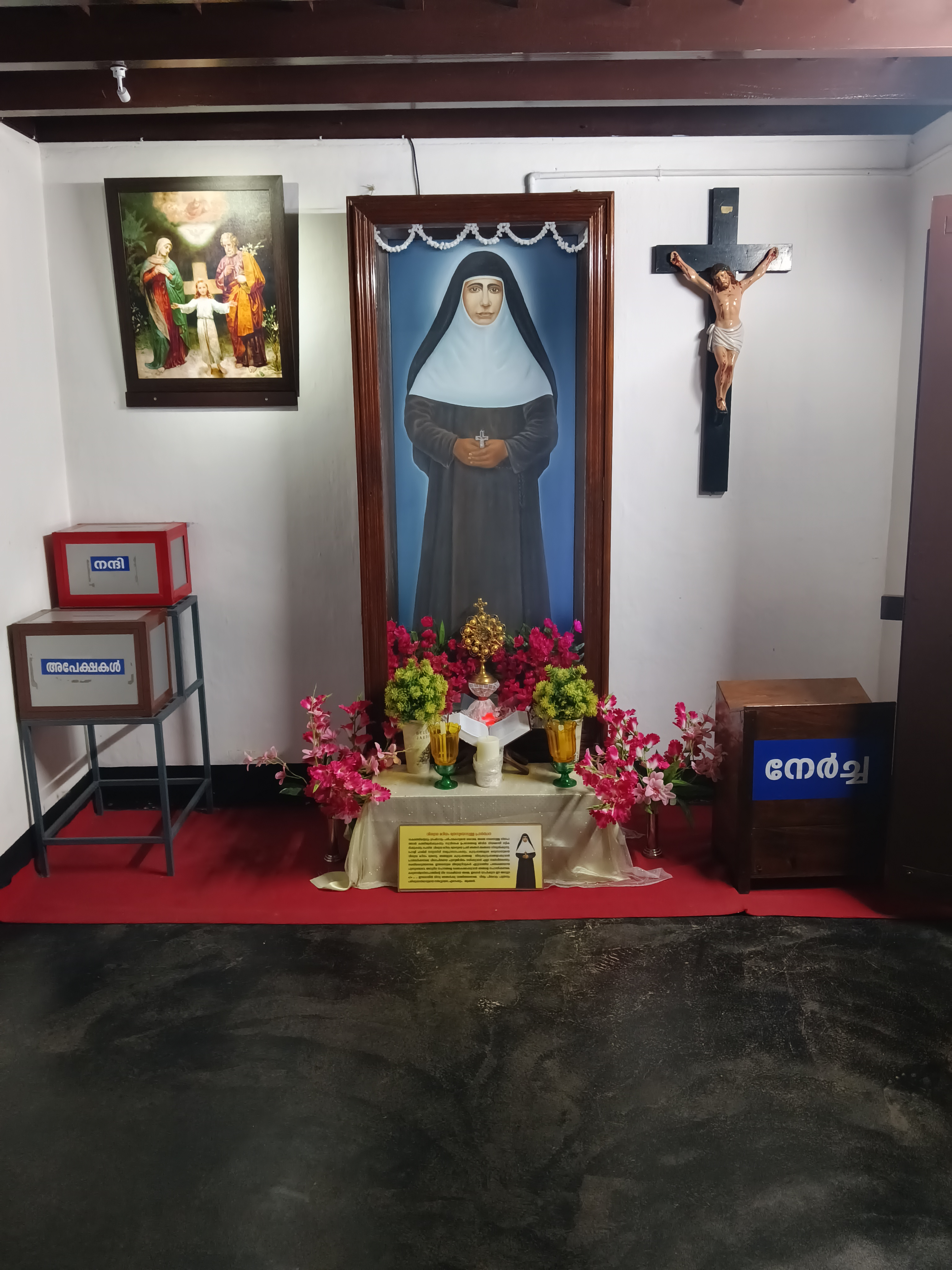
- Born: 26th April 1876; Puthenchira, Thrissur, British India
- Died: 8 June 1926 (aged 50); Kuzhikattussery, Thrissur, British India
- Venerated in: Catholic Church especially: Syro-Malabar Church; Syro-Malankara Catholic Church; Latin Catholic Church
- Beatified: 9th April 2000, Saint Peter's Square, Vatican City by Pope John Paul II
- Canonized: 13 October 2019, Saint Peter's Square, Vatican City by Pope Francis
- Major shrine: Puthenchira, India
- Feast: 6th June, 26th April at St Mary's Forane Puthenchira

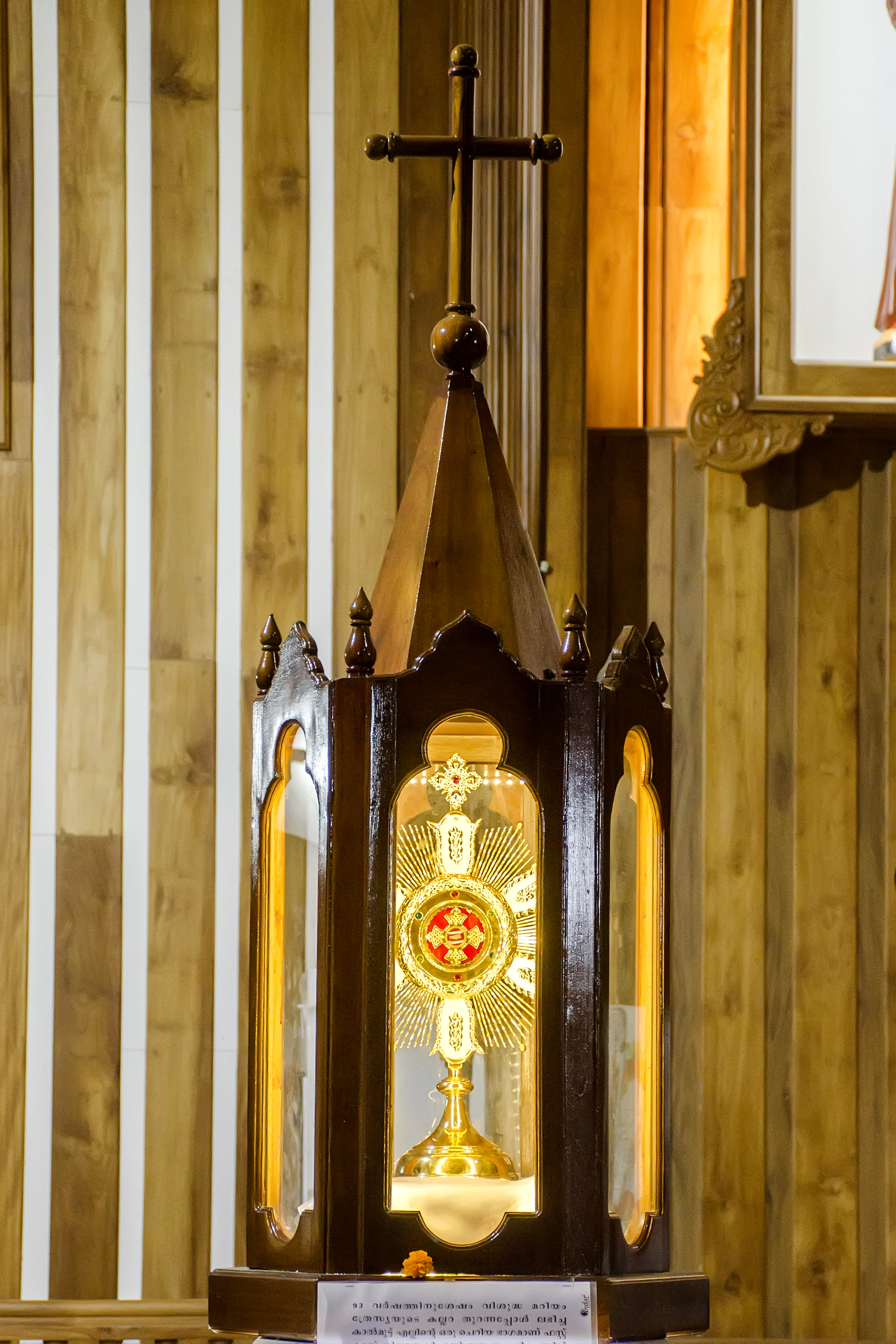
A relic of Mariam Thresia

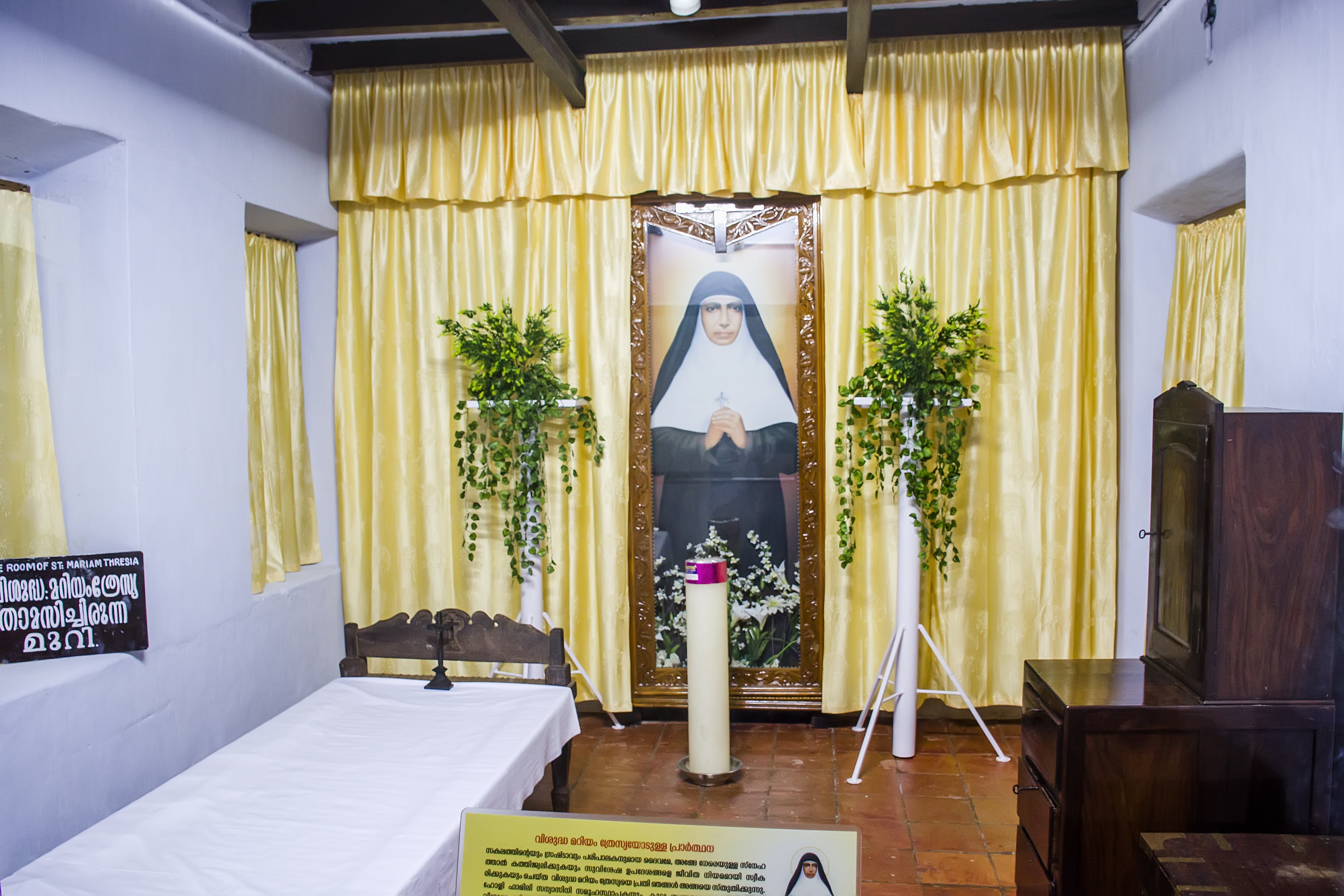
Room where St. Mariam Thresia lived

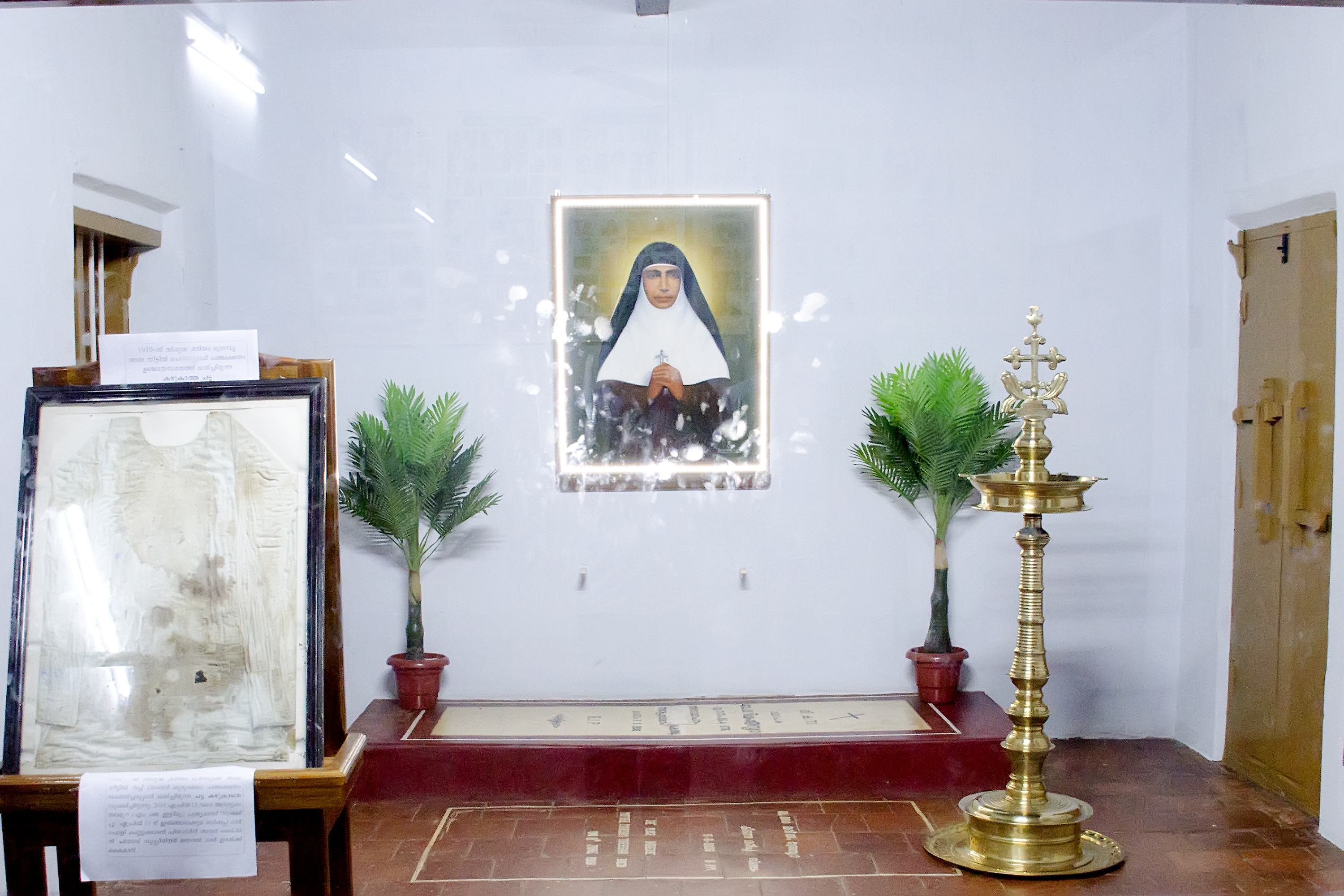
The room where St. Mariam Thresia died

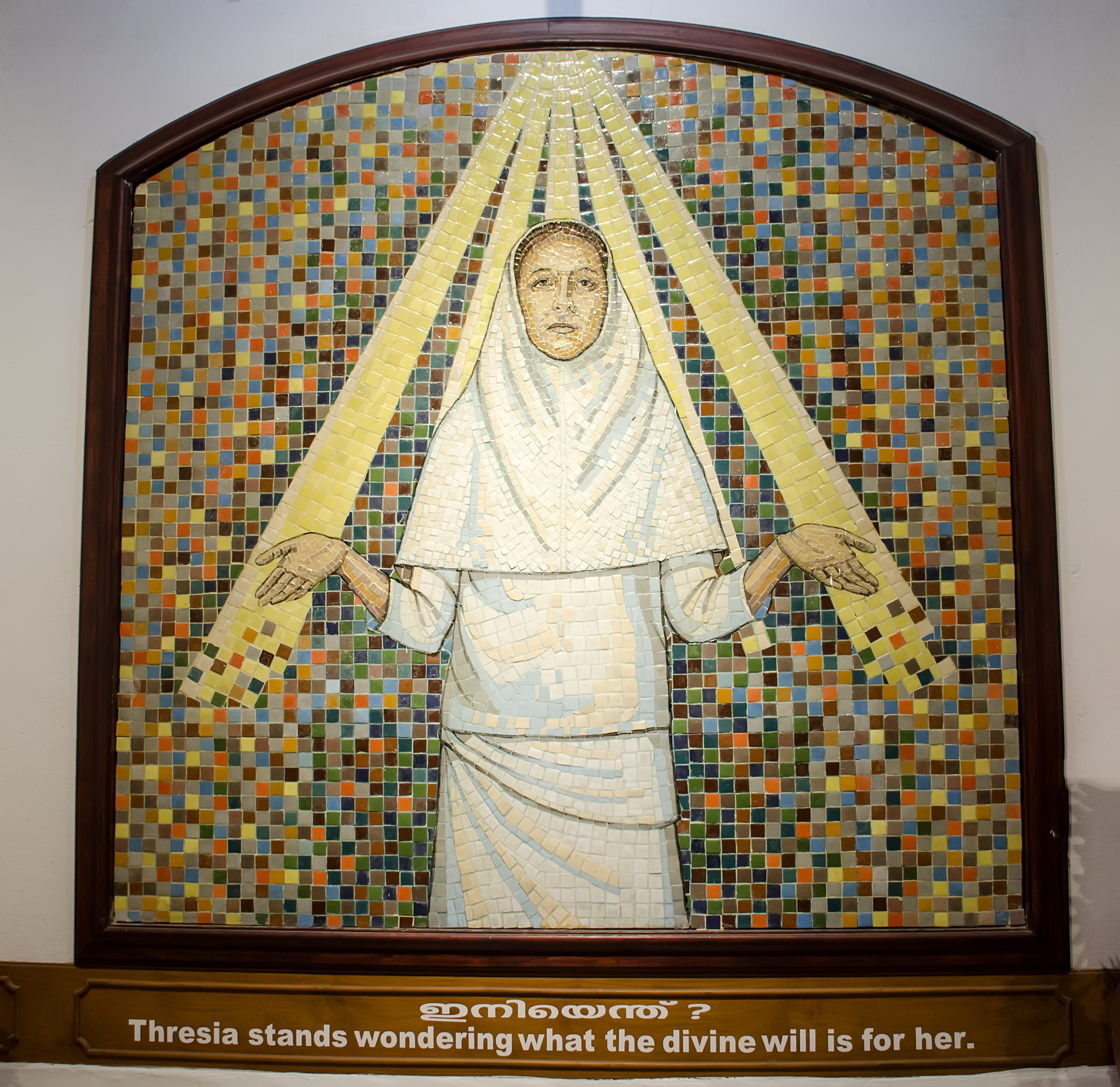
A portrait of St. Mariam Thresia exhibited in the museum

Mariam Thresia (born Thresia Chiramel Mankidiyan; 26 April 1876 – 8 June 1926) was an Indian Syro-Malabar Catholic religious sister and the founder of the Congregation of the Holy Family. She was born in Puthenchira, a village in present day Kerala, India. Thresia Mankidiyan is said to have received the stigmata which she kept well-guarded. She had been involved in apostolic work her entire life and pushed for strict adherence to the rule of the congregation amongst her fellow sisters.

Pope John Paul II beatified Mankidiyan on 9 April 2000. Pope Francis canonized her on 13 October 2019.

== Life ==
Thresia Chiramel Mankidiyan was born in Puthenchira in Irinjalakuda Revenue Division of Thrissur district on 26 April 1876 as the third of five children of Thoma and Thanda and was later baptized on 3 May 1876 at the church of Saint Mary; she was named in honor of Teresa of Ávila. Her paternal uncle Antony Chiramel Mankidiyan was her godfather and his wife Anna was the godmother. Her family was once rich though became poor when her grandfather married off seven daughters after selling property for each costly dowry; this led to her brothers and her father taking up drinking. Her mother was her father's second wife; her father's first wife Mariamkutty died during childbirth in 1872. She had two sisters and two brothers.

In 1884 her mother tried in vain to dissuade the pious girl from her severe fasts and night vigils. Her mother died on 2 March 1888 after blessing her children who gathered at her deathbed. Her mother's death marked the conclusion of her studies and she instead dedicated herself to contemplation in her local parish church. She made a private vow to remain chaste in 1886. In 1891 she hatched a scheme to sneak from home to lead a life of penance in the hills but soon decided against this and instead returned home. Since 1904 she desired to be called "Mariam" under the belief she had a vision from the Blessed Virgin Mary in which she was instructed to add it to her name. From 1902 to 1905 she was subjected to several exorcisms from Joseph Vithayathil – under the orders of the local bishop – and from 1902 it was Vithayathil who became her spiritual director until her death.

In 1903 she requested the Archbishop of Thrissur, John Menachery, to build a house of retreat but it was turned down. This happened after she had formed a group with three other friends and engaged in apostolic work with poor families. Menachery instead suggested she make an effort to join a religious congregation and encouraged her to join the new Congregation of the Franciscan Clarists but left since she did not feel called to it. Mankidiyan later accepted Archbishop Menachery's request in 1912 to join the Carmelites at Ollur and was there from 26 November 1912 until she left on 27 January 1913 because she did not feel drawn to them either. In 1913 she set up a house at Puthenchira and on 14 May 1914 founded the Congregation of the Holy Family to which she was professed in and vested in its habit; she was the first superior of the congregation.

== Stigmata ==
She was said to have had a range of spiritual experiences such as receiving the stigmata and hid this from public view; she first had this in 1905 though became more visible on 27 January 1909. In 1926 a falling object struck her on the leg and the wound soon festered. Mankidiyan was admitted to the local hospital though doctors deemed her condition fatal and she was moved by bullock cart back to the convent where on 7 June 1926 she received the final sacraments and the viaticum.

== Death ==
She died at 10 pm on 8 June 1926 from her leg wound that her diabetes exacerbated. Her final words were: "Jesus, Mary and Joseph, I give you my heart and my soul" – she then closed her eyes and died. On the morning of her death she was laid on the floor on a mat at her request with her spiritual director and fellow sisters huddled around her. Her funeral was celebrated on 9 June and in accordance with her wishes her remains were not washed prior to her funeral.

== Beatification process ==
The beatification process opened in Irinjalakuda on 12 July 1982 after the Congregation for the Causes of Saints titled her as a Servant of God and issued the official nihil obstat ("nothing against") to the cause while the cognitional process opened on 14 May 1983 and concluded its business on 24 September 1983. The board of historians met to assess the cause and to determine if historical obstacles existed before issuing their approval for the cause on 27 May 1997 at which point the theologians approved it on 9 October 1998 as did the Congregation on 19 April 1999. Pope John Paul II named Mankindiyan as venerable on 28 June 1999 after he confirmed that she had lived a life of heroic virtue.

The investigation of the miracle required for beatification was held in the Trissur eparchy from 28 April 1992 to 26 July 1993 and was validated on 22 January 1999 before receiving the approval of the medical board on 16 November 1999. Theologians then voiced their own approval on 5 January 2000. The miracle was that of the cure of Mathew D. Pellissery, who was born in 1956 with congenital club feet. He could barely walk with great difficulty on the sides of his feet until he was fourteen. After 33 days of fasting and prayer by the whole family, invoking the help of Mariam Thresia Mankidiyan, his right foot was straightened during sleep on the night of 21 August 1970. Similarly after 39 days of fasting and prayer his left foot was also straightened overnight during sleep on 28 August 1971. Since then, Mathew has been able to walk normally. This double healing was declared inexplicable in terms of medical science by as many as nine doctors in India and Italy and thus met the last canonical requirement for her beatification. It was declared a miracle obtained through the intercession of Mariam Thresia by the Congregation on 18 January 2000 before the Pope issued final approval on it on 27 January 2000. John Paul II beatified Mariam Thresia on 9 April 2000 in Saint Peter's Square. Mathew Pellissery was present there during the beatification ceremony.

A second miracle was investigated in the diocese of its origin and later received the formal validation of the Congregation in Rome on 24 June 2014. The miraculous healing of a child received approval from the medical board in Rome in March 2018 and theologians later confirmed it in October 2018. Pope Francis approved this miracle on 12 February 2019; the canonization was celebrated on 13 October 2019.

== Media ==
Vaazhthappetta Mariam Thresia: Kudumbangalude Madhyastha directed by Sibi Yogyaveedan on Shalom won the award for the best teleserial at Kerala State television awards for 2013.
