= Bilwamangal (1919 film) =

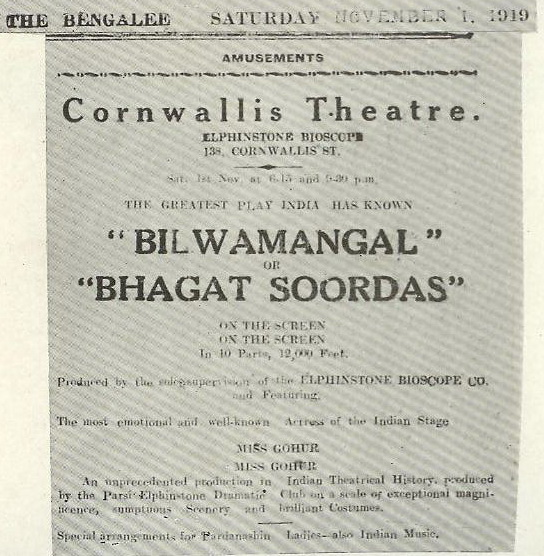
- Film advertisement
- Directed by: Rustomji Dhotiwala
- Written by: Champsi Udeshi
- Produced by: Elphinstone & Pt. Kanhaiya lal Bioscope Company, Calcutta; Madan Theatres Ltd
- Starring: Miss Gohur, miss Gulab devi, Dorabji Mewawala
- Release date: 1 November 1919
- Running time: 132 minutes (12000 feet)
- Country: India
- Languages: Silent film Bengali intertitles

Bilwamangal (pronounced [bilamaŋal]), also known as Bhagat Soordas, is a 1919 Indian black-and-white silent film directed by Rustomji Dhotiwala, based on a story by Champshi Udeshi about the medieval Hindu devotional poet Bilwamangala (also identified with Surdas). This full length (12000 feet) film was produced by the Elphinstone Bioscope Company, Calcutta with Bengali intertitles and is credited as the first Bengali feature film. It was released on 1 November 1919 at Cornwallis Theatre in Calcutta. The National Film Archive of India acquired the footage of film from Cinémathèque Française, France in 2016. The acquired footage is 594 metres long or run 28 minutes at 18 frames per second (FPS).

== Plot ==
It featured the story of Bilwamangal (or Surdas), a man whose life ruined due to his relationship with courtesan Chintamani.

== Cast ==
- Miss Gohur as Temptress Chintamani
- Dorabji Mewawala as Bilwamangal/Surdas
