= Main Naahin Maakhan Khaayo =

Devotional song by Surdas

Song
- Language: Braj Bhasa
- Genre: Classical
- Length: 3:20
- Songwriter: Surdas

Main Naahin Maakhan Khaayo is a popular Indian bhajan, a Hindu devotional song written by 15th-century mystic-poet, Surdas set to Raga Ramkali. It is written in Braj Bhasha, a Central Indo-Aryan language native to Braja, and epitomizes Vātsalya (Parental Love) Rasa describing an episode from the lilas of Krishna.

== Popular culture ==
The bhajan was popularised by singers like Lata Mangeshkar, Anup Jalota and Kundan Lal Saigal. The song was also included in B.R. Chopra's television series Mahabharat and it was performed by Nitin Mukesh.

== Context ==
Lord Krishna says to his mother that he did not steal the butter. A very popular bhajan, the naughty child Krishna was caught with freshly churned butter by his mother Yashoda, with some still on his face. He claims:

O Mother mine, believe me, I have not eaten the butter
These friends of mine, out of sheer spite, spread some butter on my face
