= Karthyayani Devi Temple, Cherthala =

Hindu temple in Kerala, India

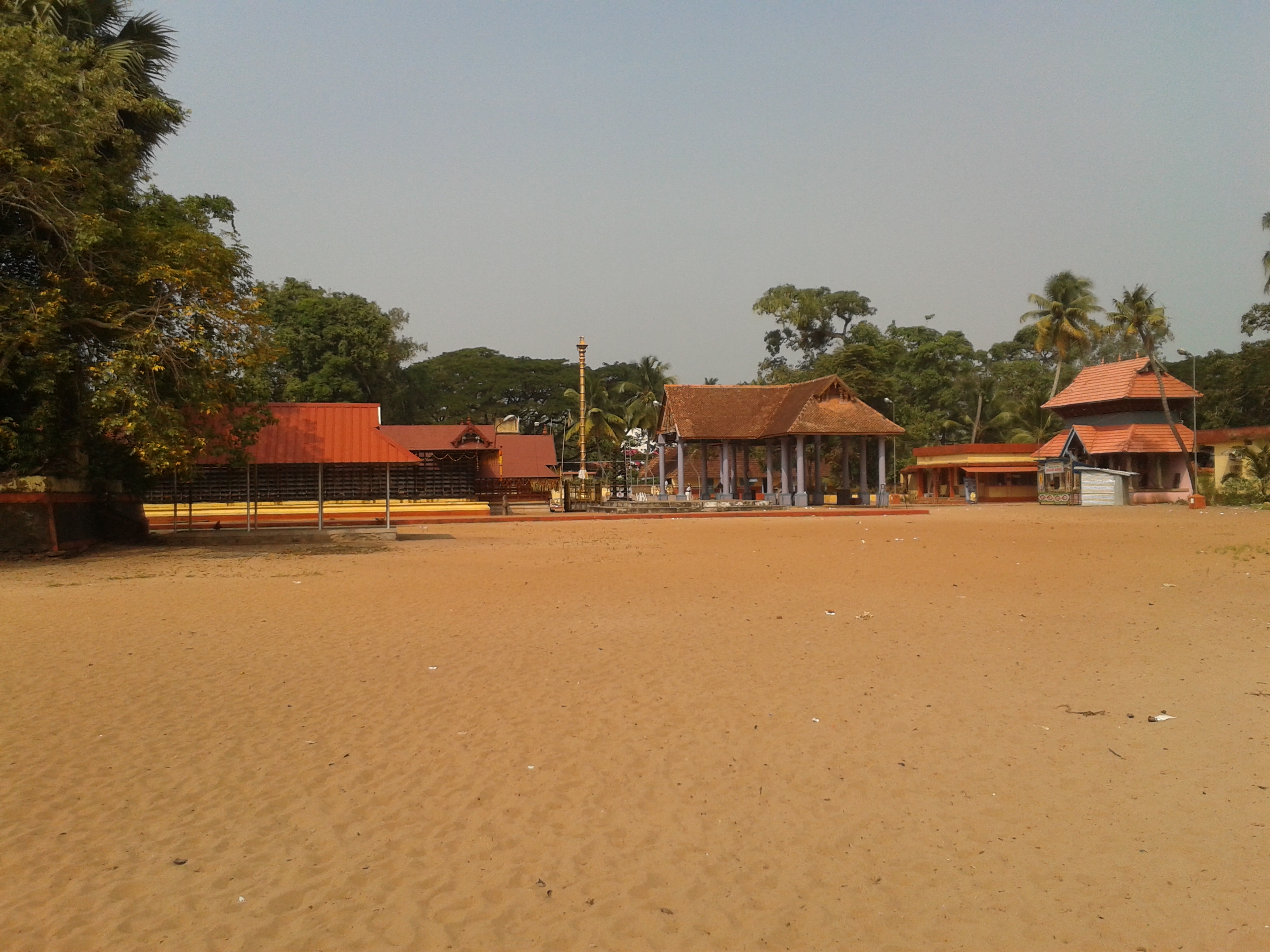

- Karthyayini Devi Temple, Cherthala, Alappuzha, Kerala

Religion
- Affiliation: Hinduism
- District: Alappuzha
- Deity: Karthyayani Devi
- Festival: Cherthala Pooram

Location
- Location: Cherthala
- State: Kerala
- Country: India
- Interactive map of Karthyayani Devi Temple, Cherthala
- Coordinates: 9°41′10.6″N 76°20′29.0″E

Architecture
- Temple: One

Karthyayani Devi Temple, Cherthala is a famous Hindu temple located at Cherthala. Iratti and Thadi are the famous vazhipadu, Cherthala pooram is the second famous pooram in Kerala. Kalabham, in familywise, can be held on there, kalabham is a famous vazhipadu.

== Location ==
This temple is located with the geographic coordinates of (9°41′10.6″N 76°20′29.0″E) at an altitude of about 25.14 m above the mean sea level in Cherthala.

== Legends and Beliefs ==
It is believed that the famous Indian Saint Vilwamangalam Swamiyar consecrated Devi in this temple. While he was going back after consecrating 'Padmanabha Swamy' at Sree Padmanabha Swamy Temple, Thiruvananthapuram he saw Devi at this place and consecrated her in this place is the popular belief. The deity 'Cherthala Karthyayani Devi' is famous as 'Mangalya Dayini' in the sense she provides welfare and prosperity for her devotees and removes obstacles for the marriage of young girls.

== Deities and Sub Deities ==
The main deity is Karthyayani Devi, who is installed in a platform below the ground level, and is thus believed to be 'swayambhoo' (self-originated). The idol is in the form of a Shivalingam, and has no definite form. Other than Karthyayani Devi, there are numerous sub-deities like Shiva, Vishnu, Ganapathi, Dharmasastha, Snake deities, etc. Among these deities, Dharmasastha, who is known as Kavudayon in this temple has more importance. He is given a special offering named Thadi here.

== Offerings ==
Archana, Rakta Pushpanjali (flower offerings), Swayamvara Pushpanjali, Muzhukappu (adorning the deity with sandalwood paste), and so on for the Devi. For Lord Sastha 'Neerajanam' and a special offering known as 'Aalthadi' is performed. The 'vazhipadu' (offering) 'Aalthadi' is offered by the devotees in the belief that their physical ailments will be removed. 'Thalappoli' is also an important offering here: a lighted oil lamp is placed on a flower decorated plate and women carry them accompanying Devi's processions etc.

== Festivals ==
Usually in other temples of Kerala, during the annual festival, 'Aarattu' is a ritual held once annually. At Chottanikara Devi Temple Aarattu is held every day during festival. At Cherthala Karthyayani Temple 'Aarattu' is held twice every day during the annual festival. Karthika Star day in the Malayalam month of Vrichikam is also well celebrated.

== Connection with Gandhiji ==
This temple was the venue for one of the speeches given by Gandhiji, on January 18, in the year 1937.

== See also ==
- Anandavalleeswaram Temple, Kollam
- Sreevaraham Lakshmi Varaha Temple, Thiruvananthapuram
