= Surdas =

Indian writer, poet and singer (1483–1563)

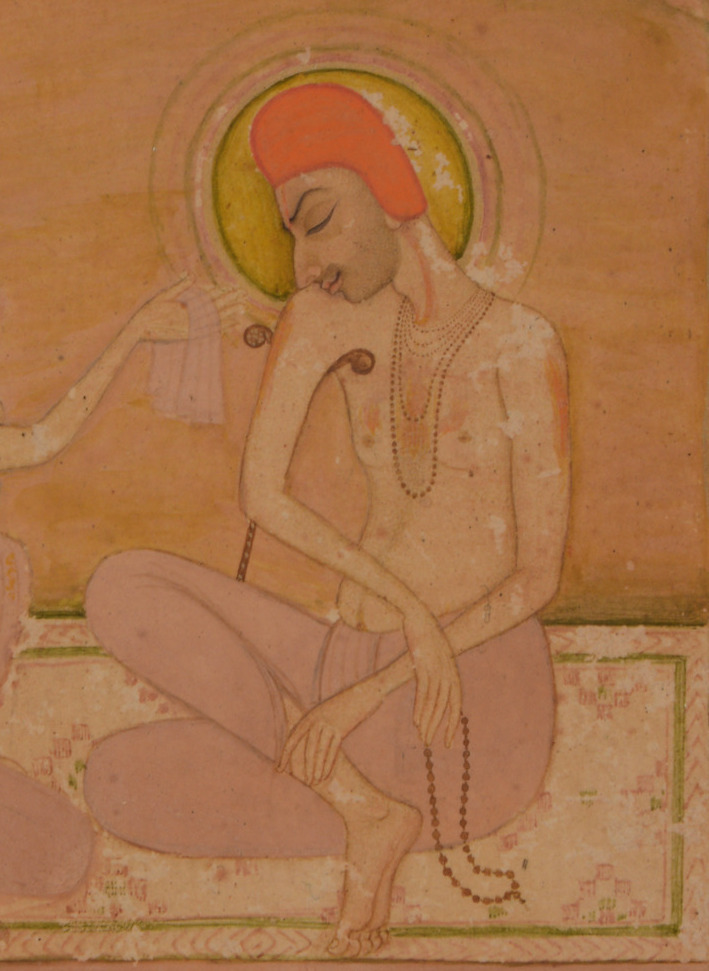
- Detail of a painting of Surdas, Kishangarh style, Rajasthan, circa 18th century

Personal life
- Born: c. 1483 Gram Sihi, Faridabad, Delhi Sultanate
- Died: c. 1563 Braj Parsauli, Mughal Empire
- Parents: Ramdas Saraswat (father); Jamunadas (mother)
- Notable work(s): Sur Sagar, Sur Saravali, Sahitya Lahari
- Known for: Influencing the Bhakti movements, Sant Mat,

Religious life
- Religion: Hinduism
- Philosophy: Bhakti

Surdas was a 16th-century blind Hindu devotional poet and singer, who was known for his works written in praise of Krishna. Most of his devotional songs, or bhajans, were written in the Braj language, while some were also written in other dialects of medieval Hindi, like Awadhi.

Surdas's biography is most often told through the lens of the Vallabha Sampradāya aka the Puṣṭimārga. The Puṣṭimārga regards Surdas as an initiated disciple of Vallabha, and his hagiography is told in the Caurāsī Vaiṣṇavan kī Vārtā by Gokulnāth and Harirāy. Surdas' poems, along with those of other Aṣṭachāp poets, form a central part of Puṣṭimārga liturgical singing-worship. However modern scholars consider the connection between Sūrdās and Vallabha and his sect to be ahistorical.

The book Sur Sagar (Sur's Ocean) is traditionally attributed to Surdas. However, many of the poems in the book seem to be written by later poets in Sur's name. The Sur Sagar in its present form focuses on descriptions of Krishna as the lovely child of Gokul and Vraj, written from the gopis' perspective.

== Life and work ==
The Encyclopaedia of Indian Literature suggests a birth year of 1258 into a Brahmin family of Uttar Pradesh. Encyclopædia Britannica states that his lifespan is "traditionally" given as 1483-1563. Sources state he was either a Sārasvata Brāhmaṇa, a Jāṭa, or a Ḍhāṛhī.

Surdas, whose name translates to "servant of the sun", is celebrated as the pinnacle of poetic artistry in Braj bhasha. This language is linked to the Braj region, where Krishna is said to have spent his childhood. The hagiographer Nabha Dass, in his Bhaktamal, praised Surdas for his poetic skill, especially in depicting "Hari's playful acts", a reference to Krishna's divine activities. Surdas also composed poems about Ram and Sita but primarily focused on Krishna's life and deeds.

=== Poetry ===
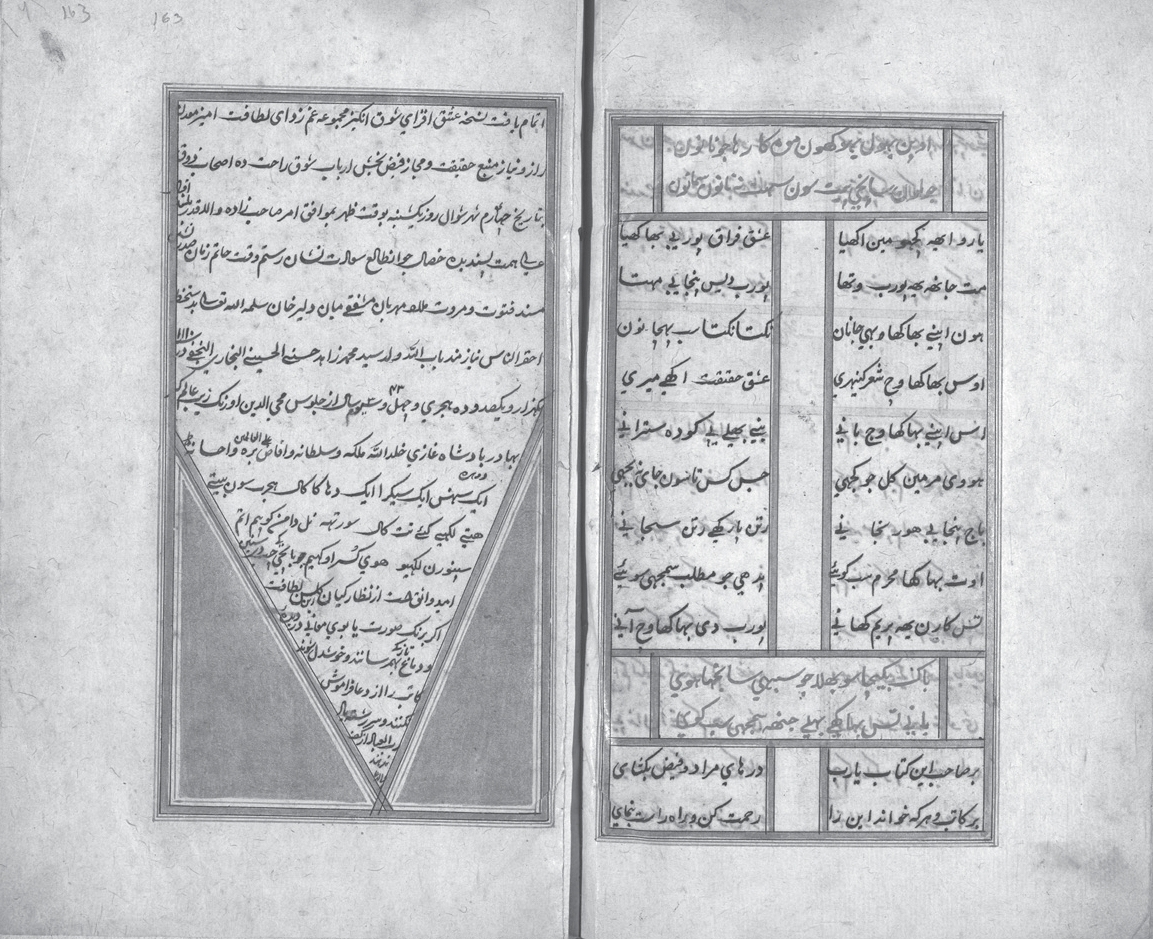
Folios of a manuscript of the 'Nam Daman' of Surdas, by Babullah for Dilir Khan, copied in 1698

Surdas's poetry was written in a dialect of Hindi called Braj Bhasha, until then considered to be a very plebeian language, as the prevalent literary languages were either Persian or Sanskrit. His work raised the status of the Braj Bhasha from a crude language to that of a literary one. According to Tyler W. Williams, Surdas composed the work Nal Daman in 1659, based upon the older story of Nala and Damayanti.

Surdas's poems are collectively known as the Sursagar or "Ocean of Sur" due to a large volume of poems attributed to his name. The traditional format of the Sursagar is divided into twelve parts, similar to the Hindu scripture, the Bhagavata Purana. Just as the Bhagavata Purana describes the life and actions of Krishna, the Sursagar also takes on a similar feat with a majority of its poems dedicated to Krishna. Many of the poems found in Sursagar are pads, containing six to ten rhymed verses. Other subject matter covered include Rama and Sita, Vishnu, Shiva, heroes within Hinduism like Gajendra and King Bali, and the poet's spiritual struggles.

== Philosophy ==
Eight disciples of Vallabha Acharya are called the Aṣṭachāp, (Eight seals in Hindi), named after the oral signature chap written at the conclusion of literary works. Sur is considered to be the foremost among them.

== Popular culture ==
Several films have been made about the poet's life. These include: Surdas (1939) by Krishna Dev Mehra, Bhakta Surdas (1942) by Chaturbhuj Doshi, Sant Surdas (1975) by Ravindra Dave, Chintamani Surdas (1988) by Ram Pahwa.

The legend of the blind poet Bilwamangala (identified with Surdas) and Chintamani has also been adapted several times in Indian cinema. These films include: Bilwamangal or Bhagat Soordas (1919) by Rustomji Dhotiwala, Bilwamangal (1932), Chintamani (1933) by Kallakuri Sadasiva Rao, Chintamani (1937) by Y. V. Rao, Bhakta Bilwamangal (1948) by Shanti Kumar, Bilwamangal (1954) by D. N. Madhok, Bhakta Bilwamangal (1954) by Pinaki Bhushan Mukherji, Chintamani (1956) by P. S. Ramakrishna Rao, Chintamani (1957) by M.N. Basavarajaiah, Chilamboli (1963) by G. K. Ramu, Bilwamangal (1976) by Gobinda Roy, Vilvamangal Ki Pratigya (1996) by Sanjay Virmani.

== Gallery ==
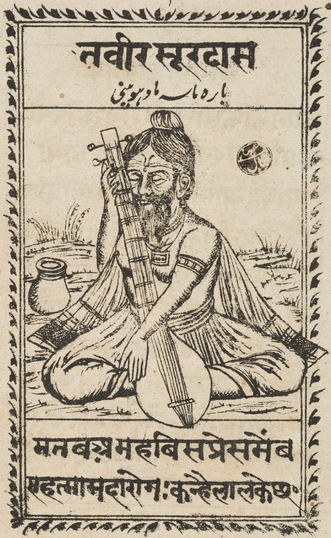
Illustration of Surdas, Amritsar, Punjab, 1887

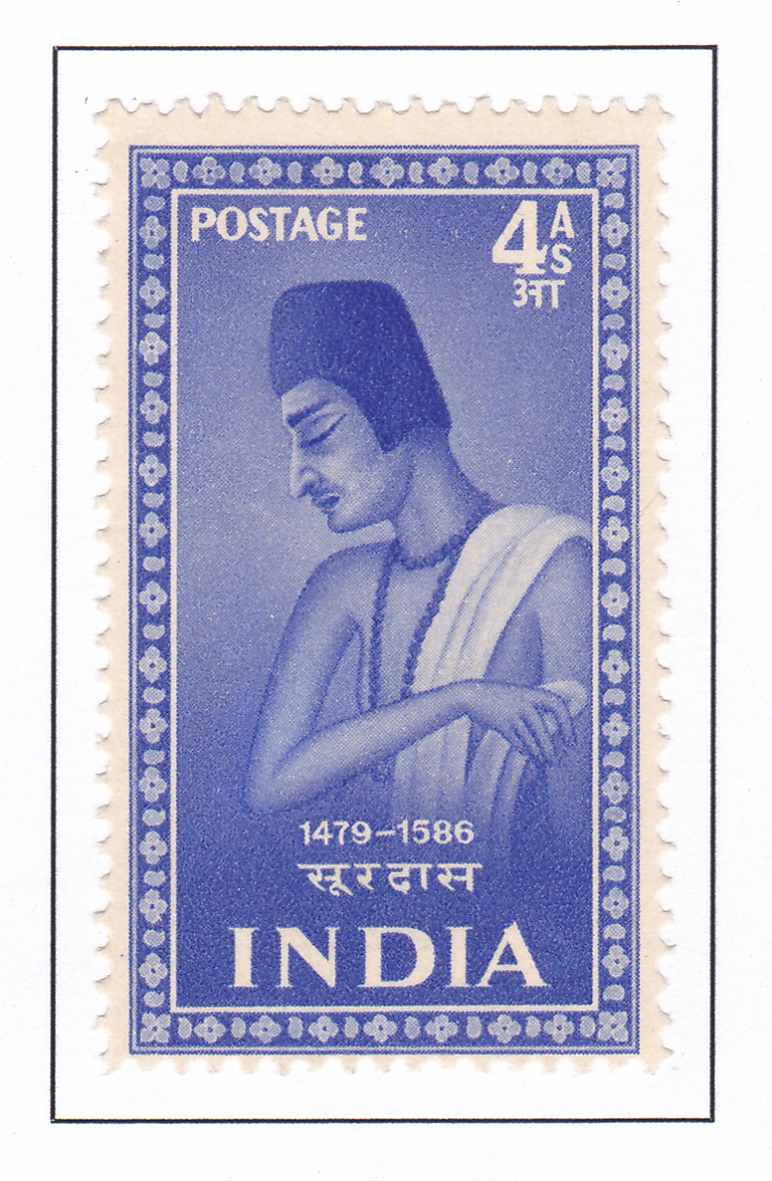
A commemorative postage stamp depicting Surdas issued by India Post on 1 October 1952

== See also ==
- Kabir Says
- Main Naahin Maakhan Khaayo
- Sant Mat
- Bhajan
- Sant Surdas (Sihi) metro station
