= Radhae Unakku Kobam Aagathadi =

Song by M. K. Thyagaraja Bhagavathar

from the album Chintamani
- Language: Tamil
- Released: 12 March 1937
- Length: 3:25
- Composer: Papanasam Sivan
- Producer: Royal Talkies

"Radhae Unakku Kobam Aagathadi" (Please don't be angry, my darling) is a Tamil song first sung by M. K. Thyagaraja Bhagavathar in his 1937 film Chintamani. It is the first Tamil film song to become a cult classic. The song was parodied in the 1941 film Sabapathy. An adaptation of the song was sung by T. M. Soundararajan in the film Kulamagal Radhai (1963).
