= Punyaham =

Hindu purification ritual

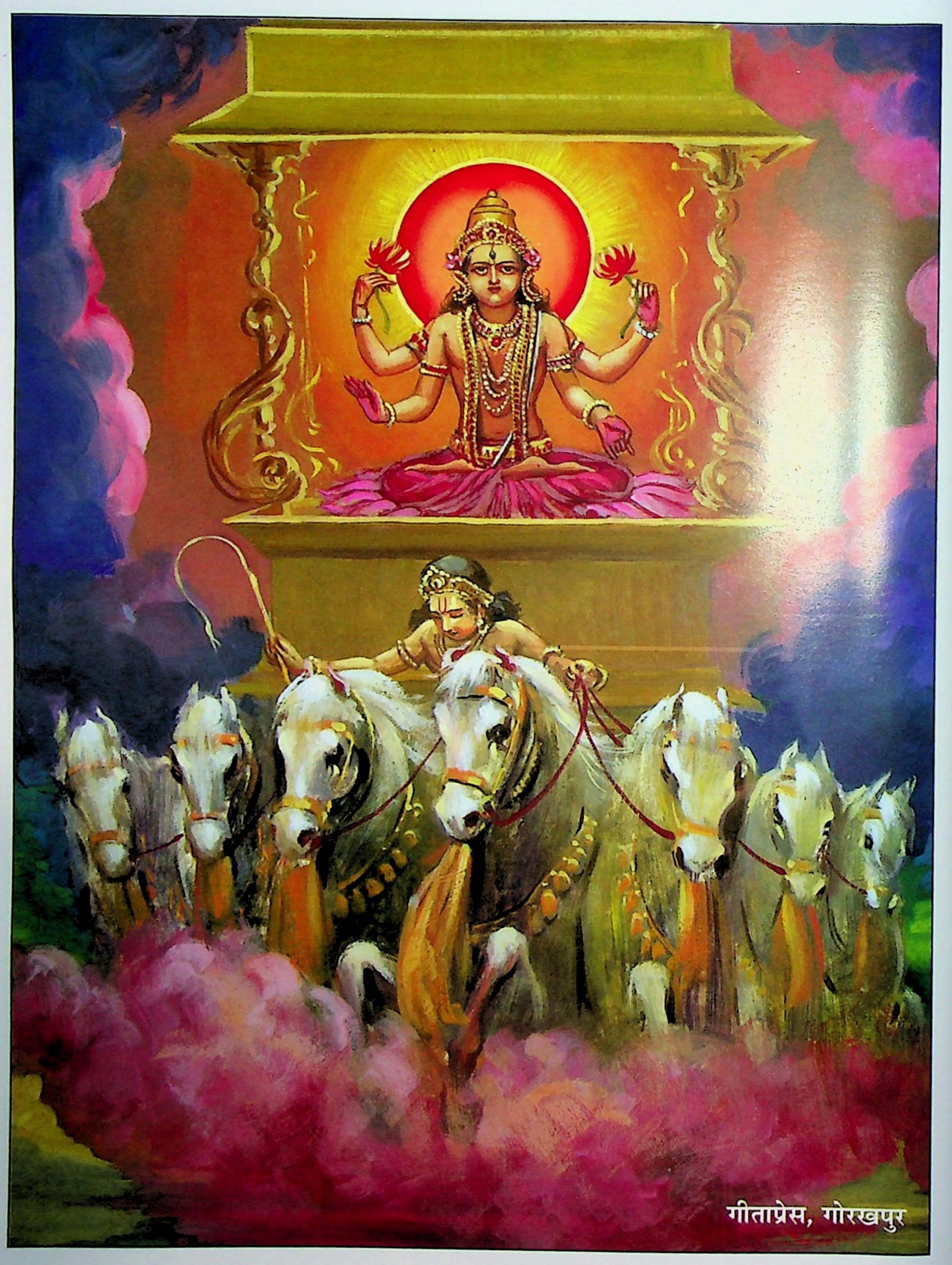
The punyaham ceremony is associated with Surya.

Punyaham (पुण्याहम्, Puṇyāham) or Punyaha (Puṇyāha) is a cleansing ritual observed by Hindus.

Performed by Brahmins, it is performed for the consecration of a house before its occupation by residents. After a site is selected as suitable for construction, the priest offers a sacrifice, and pronounces the name of the ceremony, puṇyāham, “this is an auspicious day”, to the sounding of musical instruments. He repeatedly whispers a mantra, the object of which is to request malicious spirits, asuras, and devas who may inhabit the site to leave, and find their abode elsewhere. He then takes a pot, fills it with earth mixed with cowdung white reciting mantras, and sows seeds within it.

== Etymology ==
Punyaham (पुण्याहम् - पुण्यञ्च तदहश्चेति) is a Sanskrit word that means 'an auspicious day' or 'sacred day'.

== Types ==
Punyaham is of two types: Nandeemukha Punyaham and Suddha Punyaham. The "Nandeemukha Punyaham" is performed prior to most of the important rituals for improving sanctity of the ritual. "Sudhha Punyaham" is carried out for eliminating "Asuddhi" (impurity or pollution), while "Ardha Punyaham" (half-punyaham) is a shortened version of the "Suddha Punyaham".

== Mantras ==
The Punyaha mantras are integrated form of selected mantras from the Taittiriya Samhita and the Taittiriya Brahmana.
