= Chintamani (1937 film) =

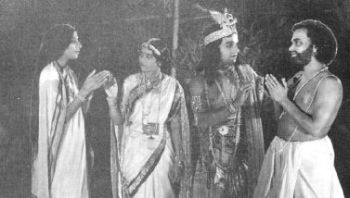
- A scene from the film
- Directed by: Y. V. Rao
- Screenplay by: A. Ayyalu Somayajulu; Serukalathur Sama
- Story by: Y. V. Rao
- Starring: M. K. Thyagaraja Bhagavathar; K. Aswathamma
- Cinematography: Y. B. Washikar
- Edited by: Bholanath Auddya
- Music by: Papanasam Sivan
- Production company: Deva Datta Films Studio
- Distributed by: Rayal Talkie Distributors
- Release date: 12 March 1937
- Running time: 215 min
- Country: India
- Language: Tamil

Chintamani film

Chintamani is a 1937 Indian Tamil-language film directed by Y. V. Rao starring M. K. Thyagaraja Bhagavathar, Serugulathur Sama and Aswathamma. It was the first Tamil film to run for a year in a single theatre.

== Production ==
Chintamani was a popular play which had been performed in many languages. The first movie based on the play was a silent one, followed by talkies adapting the play in Bengali, Hindi and Telugu. In 1937, a Tamil version of the film was directed by filmmaker Y. V. Rao under the banner of Rayal Talkies, owned by yarn merchants of Madurai.

Initially, the director Y. V. Rao, wanted to play Bilwamangal's role himself. However, he changed his mind and acted as Bilwamangal's companion Manoharan. Serugulathur Sama was another contender for the main role. But, Rao rejected him in favor of M. K. Thyagaraja Bhagavathar who was signed to play the part. In the initial stages, more publicity was given to the Kannada actress Aswathamma who played Chintamani's role than M. K. Thyagaraja Bhagavathar. Her name was mentioned above that of Bhagavathar's in the credits.

== Plot ==
Chintamani was based on the legendary story of a Sanskrit poet and devotee of Lord Krishna named Bilwamangal (M. K. Thyragaraja Bhagavathar). Bilwamangal, a resident of Varanasi, was a Sanskrit scholar, who gets infatuated towards a courtesan called Chintamani (Aswathamma), a woman of ill-fame. As a result, he deserts his wife. However, Chintamani is an ardent devotee of Lord Krishna (Serugalathur Sama) and spends most of her time singing bhajans in praise of Lord Krishna. His attraction towards Chintamani eventually draws Bilwamangal closer towards Lord Krishna and transforms his life forever. Bilwamangal, himself, becomes a devotee of Lord Krishna and pens a monumental Sanskrit work Sri Krishna Karnamritam.

== Cast ==
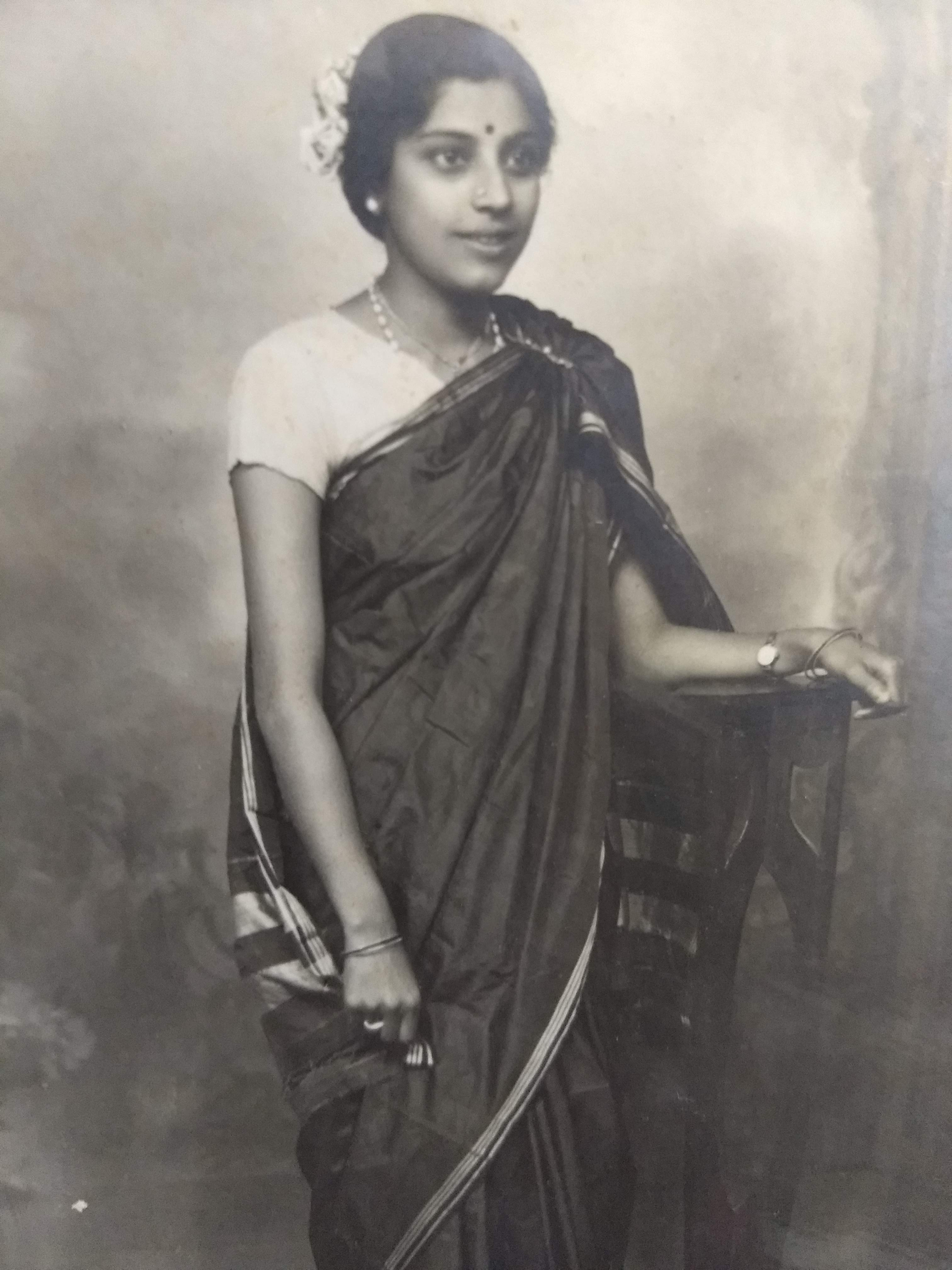
Aswathamma who played the title role of Chintamani

Cast according to the opening credits of the film and the song book

Male cast

- M. K. Thyagaraja Bhagavathar as Bilwamangal
- Serukalathur Sama as Krishnan & Sadhu
- L. Narayana Rao as Azhwar Chetty
- S. Kalyanasundaram as Umapathi Sastri
- Y. V. Rao as Manoharan
- E. Krishnamoorthi as Vaishnavan
- M. R. Durairaj as Begger & Vasudevamoorthi
- S. G. Rajam as Ragupathi
- P. S. Krishnasami as Ramachandran

Female cast

- K. Aswathamma as Chintamani
- K. Ranganayaki as Susheelai
- S. P. Mathuram as Rukmani & Sadhuni
- R. Komalam as Shrihari
- S. S. Rajamani as Meenakshi

== Release and reception ==
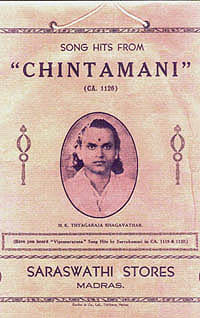
Gramaphone disks of songs from Chintamani manufactured and marketed by Saraswathi Stores

Chintamani was released on 12 March 1937 and became one of the most acclaimed films of early Tamil cinema. Though Bhagavathar's first film Pavalakkodi had achieved some success, it was Chintamani that made Bhagavathar into a successful actor. It had an uninterrupted theatrical run of more than a year. It was one of the two films of Bhagavathar, released in 1937 (the other one was Ambikapathy) which ran for more than a year. It also marked the debut in Tamil for Kannada actress Aswathamma who played the title role. Aswathamma acted in one more Tamil movie before her untimely death in 1939 due to tuberculosis.

With the substantial profits obtained from the movie, the owners of Rayal Talkies constructed a theatre in Madurai and named it Chintamani. The Tamil writer Kalki wrote that the film has so affected viewers that the housewife would sing the song Mayaprapanchattil from the movie while preparing coffee in the morning and her husband would sing Rathey unakku kobam in order to please his sweetheart.

The gramophone discs of Chintamani were also popular though M. K. Thyagaraja Bhagavathar did not sing the songs that were featured in them as he was not under contract with Saraswathi Stores which produced the records. Instead, the songs were sung by Thuraiyur Rajagopala Sarma. It continues to influence Sinhala film music to this day.

Writing in Eelakesari magazine in April 1938, Pudumaipithan praised the film as follows:

Out of the 80 odd Tamil films that have been made so far, Chintamani is considered to be best. Plot, dialogues, music, acting, cinematography, sound recording – everything is superb in this film. Among all Tamil films, it has run for the most days. Though its heroine Aswathamma is a Kannadiga from Bangalore, her lisping Tamil accent was liked by the audience. Thyagaraja Bhagavathar who has played Bilwamangal has shown his acting and singing talents

== Soundtrack ==
The soundtrack was composed by Papanasam Sivan. The song "Radhe Unakku" became famous and it is a cult song.

A partial list of songs

No.	Title	Singer(s)	Length
1.	"Radhae Unakku Kobam Aagathadi"	M. K. Thyagaraja Bhagavathar	3:29
2.	"Gnana kann"	M. K. Thyagaraja Bhagavathar	3:07
3.	"Krishna Krishna"	M. K. Thyagaraja Bhagavathar	--
4.	"Divya Darishanam"	M. K. Thyagaraja Bhagavathar	--
5.	"Maya prapanchathil"	M. K. Thyagaraja Bhagavathar	--
6.	"Nadagame Ulagam"	M. K. Thyagaraja Bhagavathar	--

== Music Credits ==
Orchestra

- A. Narayan – Gottu
- A. Venkateswaran – Violin
- M. R. Dorairaj – Tabla
- K. M. Rangachari – Organ

== Bibliography ==
- Baskaran, S. Theodore (2004). Chithiram Pesuthadi (in Tamil). Chennai: Kalachuvadu. pp. 62–3. ISBN 81-87477-75-X.
- Film News Anandan (2004). Sadhanaigal padaitha Tamil Thiraipada Varalaaru (in Tamil). Chennai: Sivagami Publications. pp. 28:11.
- Dhananjayan, G. (2014). Pride of Tamil Cinema: 1931 to 2013. Blue Ocean Publishers.
