= Puthenchira =

- village
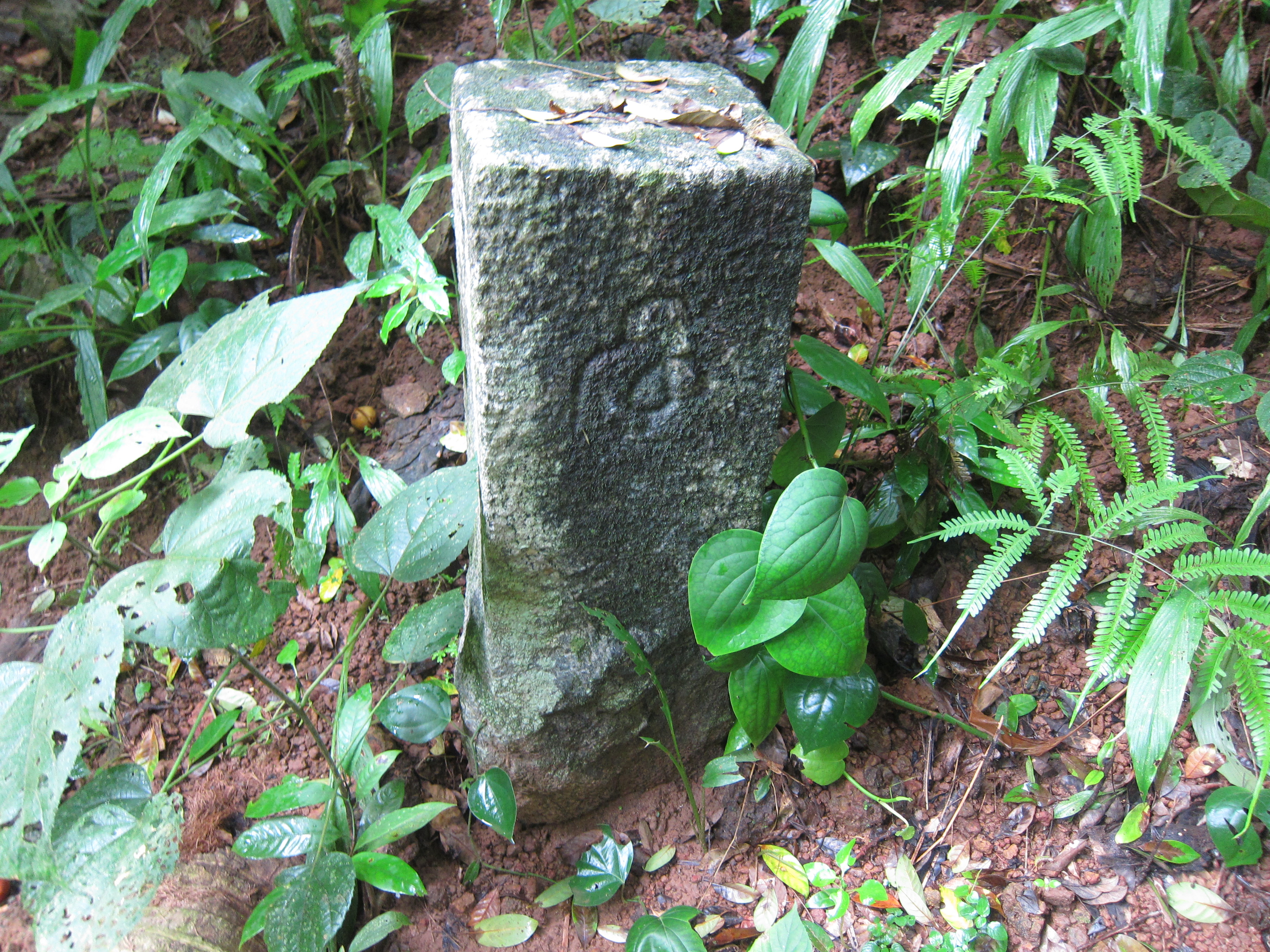
- Country: India
- State: Kerala
- District: Thrissur

Population (2011)
  - Total: 21,416

Languages
  - Official: Malayalam, English
- Time zone: UTC+5:30 (IST)
- PIN: 680682
- Vehicle registration: KL-45

Puthenchira is a village in Thrissur district in the state of Kerala, India.

== Demographics ==
As of 2011 India census, Puthenchira had a population of 21416 with 9815 males and 11601 females.

== History ==
Puthenchira and the surrounding areas were earlier known as Mahadevar Pattanam. In the second or third century, the Perumanadikals created a "Chira" (causeway/bund) for agricultural purposes. The Cheraman Perumal designated the place for building the "Chira" by throwing a Puthen (the prevailing coin of that era). Since then, it is believed that the place has been called Puthenchira.

Various muris (parts) of Puthenchira were ruled by the Kodungallur Thampuran and Mukundapuram (Muriyanatt-Nadavarambu) Nambiar after the fall of the Chera dynasty in the 12th century. Later, when the Samudiri extended his territory, both Puthenchira and Kodungallur became part of his empire. In 1761, the Cochin King sought help from Travancore. Travancore obliged and defeated the Samudiri in battle. Delighted by this, the Cochin King gave Puthenchira to Diwan Ayyappan Marthandapillai, who was the commander of the Travancore army. The Diwan subsequently dedicated Puthenchira to the Travancore King. Consequently, until the Travancore-Cochin merger in 1949, Puthenchira remained a Travancore village within the Cochin kingdom.

Puthenchira is the birthplace of Villwamangalam Swamiyar. It is believed that Paramel Thrikkov temple was built by Swamiyar. Puthenchira is also the birthplace of St. Mariam Thresia Chiramel and Joseph Vithayathil, who are the founders of St. Mary's GHSSK. Neighbouring places are Kuthirathadam, Mala, Kuzhikattusery, and Konathukunnu.

== Books about Puthenchira ==
- Sunil Villwamangalath: സ്വന്തം പുത്തന്‍ചിറ ചരിത്രവഴികളിലൂടെ, Dec. 2014.
