= Krishna Karnamrita =

Hindu devotional poem

Information
- Religion: Hinduism
- Author: Vilvamangala
- Language: Sanskrit
- Period: 9th - 15th century CE
- Verses: 300

The Krishna Karnamrita (Sanskrit: कृष्णकर्णामृतम्, romanized: Kṛṣṇakarṇāmṛtam) is a Sanskrit devotional work by the poet Vilvamangala of Kerala. Dated between the period of the ninth to the fifteenth century CE, the work eulogises the Hindu deity Krishna.

== Etymology ==
Kṛṣṇakarṇāmṛtam means 'nectar to the ears of Krishna'.

== Legend ==
According to legend, Bilvamangala is regarded to have lavished all of his time and attention on a harlot called Cintamani, being unable to focus his energy on anything else. Cintamani urged Bilvamangala to devote himself to Krishna so that he would attain eternal joy, for which she is hailed as his guru in the work. Bilvamangala travelled to Vrindavana, where he spent his final days and worked on the composition of the text. Krishna himself is regarded to have listened to the poems of Bilvamangala.

== Description ==
The work exists in two recensions. The southern and western manuscripts of the work feature three āśvāsas (sections) comprising a hundred verses each, whereas the eastern manuscripts of Bengal feature a single section of one hundred and twelve verses.

The hymns of the work describe the pastimes of the deity Krishna in Vrindavana, expressing the rasas associated with bhakti (devotion) towards him. Most of the verses describe the ardent desire of the soul to be reunited with the Ultimate Reality represented by the deity.

The text was influential for Bengali Vaishnavism due to its introduction to the region by Chaitanya Mahaprabhu, who encountered the work during his journey to the south.

== Hymn ==
The second verse of the work extols the attributes of Krishna:

Behold the object which is showered by wish-tree
blossoms falling from the finger tips
of heavenly maidens
and which, although nirvana calm,
produces a flood of sound from the famed flute.
It is the most high in the form of a boy who
gives final release into the hands of the suppliant
as he did to the thousands of encircling, dancing
milkmaids whose hold on the garment wrapped
around them was constantly being loosened.

— Verse 2

== See also ==
- Bilvamangala
- Gopalavimshati
- Yadavabhyudaya
