= Bhagat Parmanand Das =

Saint-poet

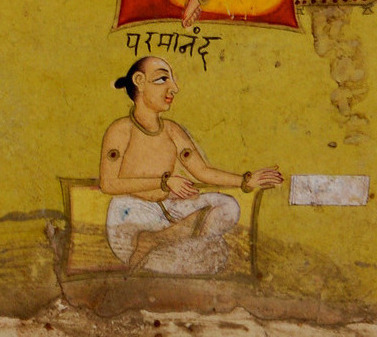
Parmanand, Bhaktamal illustration, Bundelkhand, circa late 18th century

Bhagat Parmanand Das (1483 – 1574; pronunciation: [bʱæɡæt paɾmaːnũnd]) was a Vaishnava mystic and saint-poet, one of whose hymns is included in the Guru Granth Sahib.

== Early life ==
Parmanand was born in a Kanyakubja Brahmin family of Kannauj (located in present-day Uttar Pradesh) in 1483. He is believed to have been born in Kannauj and resided at present-day Pandharpur, Maharashtra.

== Legacy ==
Parmãnand was a devotee of Vishnu and used in his songs the nom de plume Sarañg, the name of a bird ever thirsty for the raindrop. Parmanand always longed for God whom he worshiped in the Vaishnavite manifestation of Krsna. He used to make, it is said, seven hundred genuflections daily to God on his uncovered, often bleeding, knees. He believe for a long time that God could be worshiped as an Image only, He was a great devotee of lord Shri Nath ji (another name of Shri Krishna). Shri Vallabhacbarya was his Guru. Parmanand Das belonged to pushti sampraday. Another Bhakt Surdas ji was his Guru Bhai. Parmanand das ji and Surdas ji both take initiation from the same guru ( i. e. Shri vallabhacharya ji). Parmanand's hymn, which was incorporated in the Guru Granth Sahib (p. 1253) subscribes to this view. In this hymn, he disapproves of the ritualistic reading and hearing of the sacred books If that has not disposed to the service of fellow beings. He commends sincere devotion which could be imbibed from the company of holy saints. Lust, wrath, avarice, slander have to be expunged for they render all seva (selfless service) fruitless.

== Poetry ==
This is the 1 Shabad from Parmanand in the Sri Guru Granth Sahib:

- SGGS Page 1253

So what have you accomplished by listening to the Puranas?

Faithful devotion has not welled up within you, and you have not been inspired to give to the hungry. ((1)(Pause))

You have not forgotten sexual desire, and you have not forgotten anger; greed has not left you either.

Your mouth has not stopped slandering and gossiping about others. Your service is useless and fruitless. ((1))

By breaking into the houses of others and robbing them, you fill your belly, you sinner.

But when you go to the world beyond, your guilt will be well known, by the acts of ignorance which you committed. ((2))

Cruelty has not left your mind; you have not cherished kindness for other living beings.

Parmaanand has joined the Saadh Sangat, the Company of the Holy. Why have you not followed the sacred teachings? ((3)(1)(6))

Parmanand's Mahārāsa verse 776

Broken the garland of pearls, all the cowherd girls wander around, searching;

the garlands of slightly opened blossoms (in their) hair in

disarray on seeing (them), the one garlanded with forest flowers laughs.

In the dalliance of the rasa, they grasp each other by their bud- like hands, arms joined around the neck;

in between the gopis, Mādhava dances together with (each) girl- friend.

The moon shines forth in the lovely autumn night, Nanda's boy dances;

with her eyes, the loving lady drinks the nectar of Paramananda's lord's face.
