= Chintamani (1933 film) =

1933 film

- Directed by: Kallakuri Sadasiva Rao
- Written by: Kallakuri Narayana Rao
- Starring: Pulipati Venkateswarlu; Dasari Ramatilakam
- Release date: 1933
- Language: Telugu

Chintamani is a 1933 Telugu film directed by Kallakuri Sadasiva Rao about poet Bilwamangal and the courtesan Chintamani.
